= Owen Buckingham =

Owen Buckingham may refer to:

- Owen Buckingham (died 1713), MP for Reading 1698–1708, Lord May or London 1704–05
- Owen Buckingham (1674–1720), MP for Reading 1708–13, 1716–20

== See also ==
- Buckingham (surname)
