= General Cholmondeley =

General Cholmondeley may refer to:

- James Cholmondeley (1708–1775), British Army general
- George Cholmondeley, 2nd Earl of Cholmondeley (1666–1733), English Army general
- George Cholmondeley, 3rd Earl of Cholmondeley (1703–1770), British Army lieutenant general
