= Buckingham (surname) =

Buckingham is an Anglo-Saxon locational surname. It is a habitational name from the former county seat of the county of Buckinghamshire Old English Buccingahamm ‘Water Meadow (Old English Hamm) of the people of (-Inga-) Bucc(A)’. This family originated in England, United Kingdom as a prominent and wealthy British family. The Buckingham family is also a Boston Brahmin family from the U.S. state of Massachusetts, also known as the "first families of Boston". Some members of the family went to New England and arrived in Boston, Massachusetts, coming from England to the region. The Buckingham family had many members who were jurists, politicians, businessmen, military leaders, educators, clergy and authors in both England and United States. Notable people with the surname include:

- A. David Buckingham (1930–2021), British physical chemist
- Catharinus P. Buckingham (1808–1888), American Civil War general
- Celeste Buckingham (born 1995), Slovak recording artist of Swiss-American origins
- David Buckingham, American judge and former Associate Justice of the Kentucky Supreme Court
- David Buckingham, Canadian politician
- Des Buckingham (born 1985), English football manager
- Ed Buckingham, Canadian politician
- Edgar Buckingham (1867–1940), creator of the Buckingham π theorem, a key theorem in dimensional analysis
- Edward Taylor Buckingham III (born 1948), former CNMI Attorney General
- James Silk Buckingham (1786–1855), oriental traveller
- Jane Buckingham (born 1968), American author and businesswoman
- John Buckingham (chemist) (1943–2015), British chemist
- John Buckingham (cricketer) (1903–1987), English cricketer
- John Buckingham (jockey) (1940–2016), English horse racing jockey
- Kate Sturges Buckingham (1858–1937), American art collector and philanthropist, who commissioned Buckingham Fountain in Chicago
- Leicester Silk Buckingham (1825–1867), playwright
- Lilia Buckingham (born 2003), American actress and Internet personality
- Lindsey Buckingham (born 1949), American rock musician and member of Fleetwood Mac
- Lyndon Buckingham (born 1962), 22nd General of the Salvation Army
- Marcus Buckingham (born 1966), British author, business consultant, and motivational speaker
- Marjorie Buckingham (1913–2003), Australian writer of children's books and Christian fiction
- Sir Owen Buckingham (c. 1649–1713), English member of Parliament and Lord Mayor of London
- Owen Buckingham (1674–1720), English politician
- R. G. Buckingham (1816–1889), American politician from Colorado
- Richard Buckingham (1911–1994), English computer scientist
- Richard Gilpin Buckingham (1841–1939), American politician from Delaware
- Steve Buckingham (record producer), American record producer and musician
- Vic Buckingham (1915–1995), British football player and coach
- Wayne Buckingham, New Zealand men's hockey right full back (1978–1981) and part of the 1980 New Zealand Men's Hockey Olympic team
- William Alfred Buckingham (1804–1875), U.S. senator and Governor of Connecticut, United States
- William Buckingham (VC) (1886–1916), English recipient of the Victoria Cross
- William John Buckingham (1890–1964), Australian politician

== See also ==
- Duke of Buckingham, a title of British peerage
- Earl of Buckingham, a title of British peerage
- Bearers of both titles might be referred to as "Buckingham"
