= William Cooke (1682–1709) =

English Whig politician

William Cooke (18 December 1682 – 1709), of Highnam Court, near Gloucester, was an English Whig politician who sat in the English and British House of Commons from 1705 to 1709.

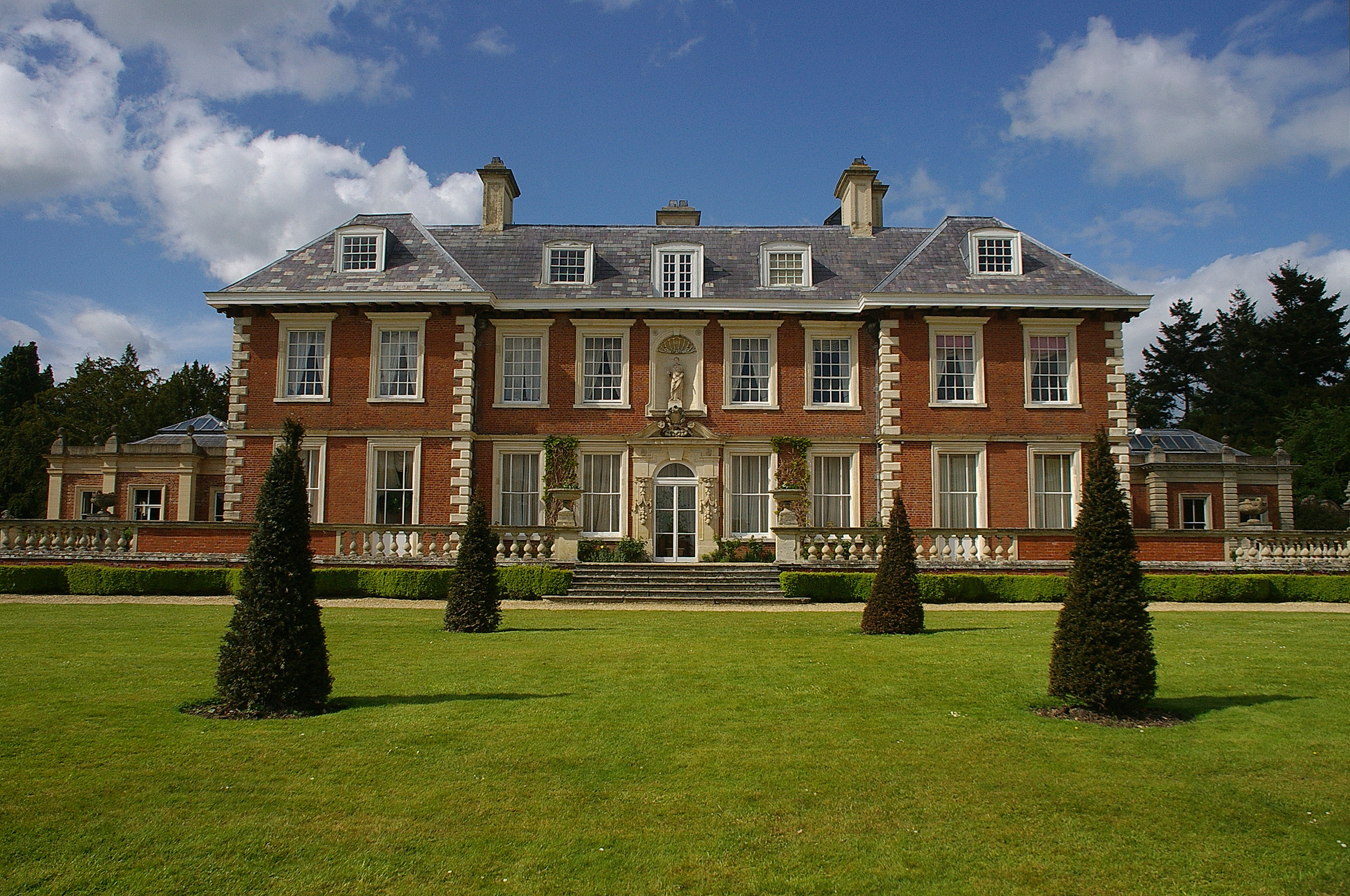
Highnam Court

Cooke was the second but eldest surviving son of Edward Cooke of Highnam, Gloucestershire and his wife Mary Newborough, daughter of Rowland Newborough of Berkley, Somerset. His grandfather, William Cooke, was also MP for Gloucester. He was admitted at Middle Temple in 1702. In 1705 he became Freeman of Gloucester.

Cooke was returned as a Whig Member of Parliament (MP) for Gloucester at the 1705 English general election. He voted for the Court candidate for Speaker on 25 October 1705 and supported the Court on the 'place clause' in the regency bill on 18 February 1706. In 1707, he was said to be pressing hard for his uncle to be appointed Dean of Gloucester, but was unsuccessful. He was returned as MP for Gloucester again at the 1708 British general election.

Cooke died unmarried in June 1709, aged 26, predeceasing his father.

Parliament of England
| Preceded by William Trye; John Hanbury | Member of Parliament for Gloucester; 1705–1707; With: John Hanbury | Succeeded by Parliament of Great Britain |
Parliament of Great Britain
| Preceded by Parliament of England | Member of Parliament for Gloucester; 1707–1709; With: John Hanbury to 1708; Thomas Webb from 1708 | Succeeded by Thomas Webb; Francis Wyndham |
