= Sir John Floyd, 1st Baronet =

British Army officer (1748–1818)

General Sir John Floyd Bt
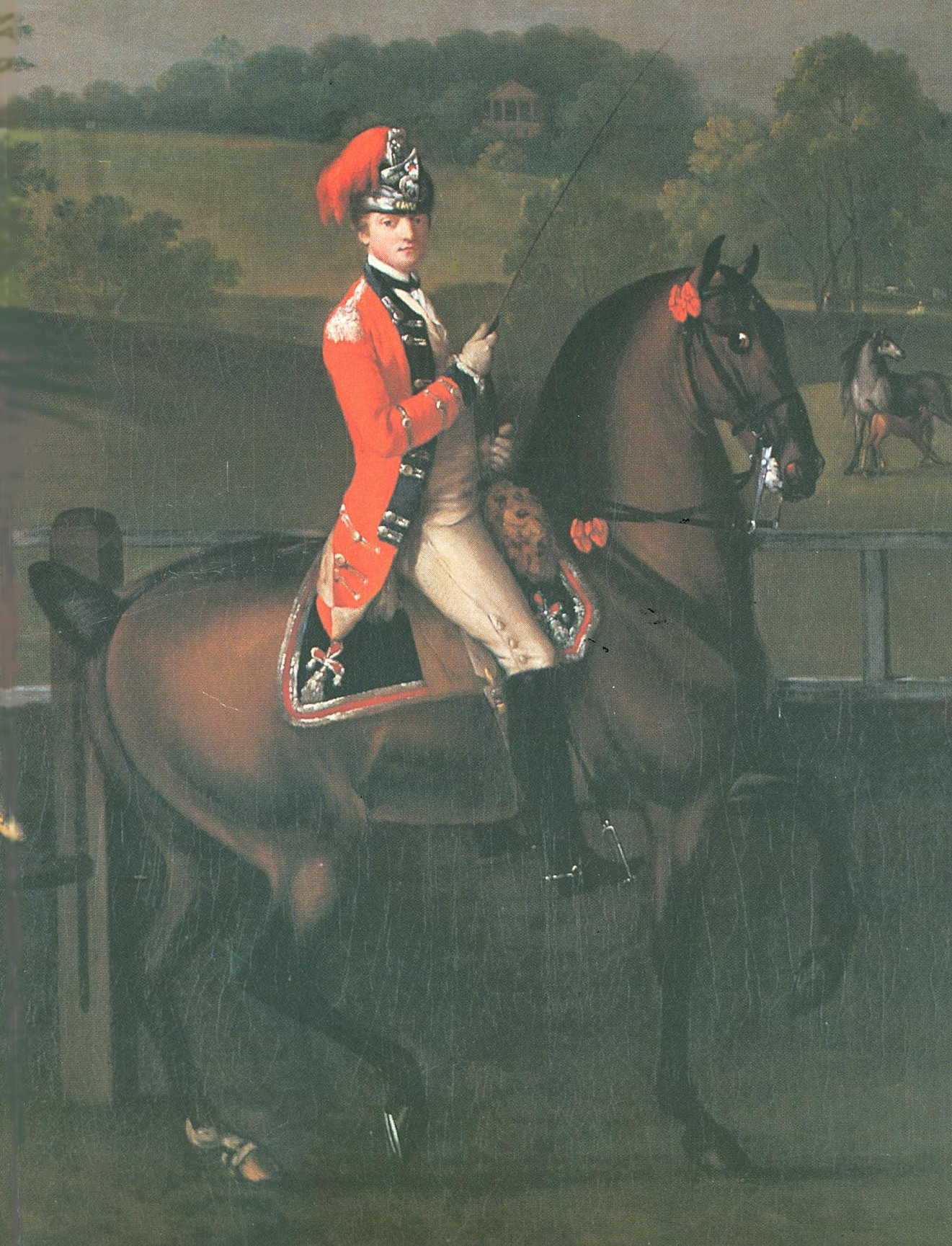
- Portrait by David Morier, c. 1768

Governor of Gravesend and Tilbury
- In office 1812–1818
- Monarch: George III
- Preceded by: Sir Thomas Musgrave, 7th Baronet
- Succeeded by: Sir Galbraith Lowry Cole

Personal details
- Born: 22 February 1748 England
- Died: 10 January 1818 (aged 69) England
- Spouse(s): Rebecca Juliana Darke; Anna Morgell
- Children: 3, including Julia
- Parent(s): John Floyd; Mary Floyd

Military service
- Allegiance: Great Britain; United Kingdom
- Branch/service: British Army
- Years of service: 1760–1818
- Rank: General
- Unit: 15th Light Dragoons; 21st Light Dragoons; 19th Light Dragoons; 23rd Light Dragoons; 8th Light Dragoons
- Battles/wars: Third Anglo-Mysore War; Siege of Bangalore

General Sir John William Floyd, 1st Baronet (22 February 1748 – 10 January 1818) was a British Army officer who served as the governor of Gravesend and Tilbury from 1812 to 1818.

== Early life ==
Born on 22 February 1748, he was the oldest child of Captain John Floyd and Mary Floyd (née Bate).

== Army career ==
He was commissioned on 5 April 1760 as a Cornet in the Eliott's Light Horse, a recently raised regiment which became the 15th The King's Hussars. He was commissioned Lieutenant on 20 April 1763 and Captain-Lieutenant on 20 May 1770. He was commissioned Captain on 25 May 1772 into the 15th (The King's) Regiment of (Light) Dragoons and Major of the 21st Light Dragoons on 5 May 1779. On 24 September 1779 he was commissioned and gazetted as Lieutenant-Colonel of the newly formed cavalry regiment for duty in India called the 23rd Light Dragoons, and later renamed the 19th Light Dragoons. He was commissioned Colonel on 18 November 1790.

He was appointed to command all cavalry and military units on the coast of India by Lord Cornwallis in 1790. In the Third Anglo-Mysore War, he led British cavalry forces against Tipu Sultan, including a notable defeat in which he lost 300 horses just before the 1791 siege of Bangalore.

He was promoted Major-General on 5 October 1794 and appointed Colonel of the 23rd Light Dragoons on 14 September 1800. On 1 January 1801, he was commissioned Lieutenant-General. He was transferred as colonel to the 8th Light Dragoons on 13 September 1804 and commissioned full General on 1 January 1812.

== Post military ==
In 1800 he returned to England, and then served for some years on the General Staff in Ireland. Floyd was made a baronet in 1816. He died suddenly of gout early in 1818.

He married firstly Rebecca Juliana Darke, daughter of Charles Darke of Madras, and secondly Anna Morgell, daughter of Crosbie Morgell of County Kerry, and widow of Sir Barry Denny, 2nd Baronet. By his first wife he had three children, including Julia, wife of Sir Robert Peel.

Coat of arms of Sir John Floyd, 1st Baronet
Crest A lion rampant reguardant Argent murally crowned Gules bearing a flag representing the standard of Tippoo Sultan flowing to the sinister Proper. Escutcheon Sable a lion rampant reguardant Argent on a chief embattled Or a sword erect Proper pommel and hilt Gold enfiled with an Eastern crown Gules between two tigers' faces also Proper. Motto Patiens Pulveris Atque Solis

== Sources ==
- Wickwire, Franklin and Mary. Cornwallis: The Imperial Years; ISBN 0-8078-1387-7

Military offices
Preceded by Sir Thomas Musgrave, Bt	Governor of Gravesend and Tilbury; 1812–1818	Succeeded by Sir Lowry Cole
Baronetage of the United Kingdom
New creation	Baronet (of Chearsley Hill, Bucks); 1816–1818	Succeeded by Henry Floyd
