= Francis Wyndham =

Francis Wyndham may refer to:

- Francis Wyndham (d. 1592), English politician and judge
- Francis Wyndham (c. 1670; d. 1716), English politician
- Francis Wyndham (b. 1924; d. 2017), English journalist, novelist, editor, and literary scout
- Sir Francis Wyndham, 1st Baronet (c. 1612; d. 1676), English soldier and politician
