= John Wagstaffe (MP) =

English politician

John Wagstaffe (1618–1697), of Ladybellegate House, Longsmith Street, Gloucester, was an English politician.

He was a member (MP) of the parliament of England for Gloucester in 1685.

Parliament of England
Preceded by Lord Herbert; Sir Charles Berkeley	Member of Parliament for Gloucester; 1685–1689; With: John Powell	Succeeded by Sir Duncombe Colchester; William Cooke
