= Sir William Rich, 2nd Baronet =

English politician

Sir William Rich, 2nd Baronet (c. 1654 – 1711), of Sonning, Berkshire, was an English politician.

He was a son of Sir Thomas Rich, 1st Baronet, and his second wife, Elizabeth, daughter of William Cockayne, alderman and merchant of London.

He was a member (MP) of the parliament of England for Reading in 1689–1698 and the period 26 November 1705 – 1708, and for Gloucester in 1698.

== Early life ==
Born around 1654, Rich was the second but only surviving son of Sir Thomas Rich, and his second wife, Elizabeth Cockayne. In 1667, he succeeded his father as the 2nd Baronet Rich of Sonning, Berkshire, a title created in the Baronetage of England in 1661.

== Political career ==
Rich's political interests became evident in 1680 when he accompanied the Duke of Monmouth and Lord Lovelace on a visit to Oxford. He sought to contest the 1685 general election for Reading but was denied due to not being a freeman of the town. Although the initial election was declared void, Rich came last in the subsequent by-election. Despite these setbacks, he was listed among those opposed to King James II.

Following the Glorious Revolution, Rich's political fortunes improved. He was successful in the 1689 election for Reading and sat in Parliament until 1698. During this period, he aligned himself with the Court Whigs and supported the disabling clause in the bill to restore corporations. Re-elected in 1690, he continued to vote consistently with the Court Whigs.

Rich briefly represented Gloucester in 1698 before returning to Reading for another term (1705–1708). He died in 1711 and was buried at Sonning. It wasn't until 1784 that another member of his family, his great-grandson, the 5th Baronet, re-entered Parliament as a government supporter.

== Marriages ==
Rich married Lady Anne Bruce (d. 1716) in 1672. Lady Anne was the daughter of Robert Bruce, 1st Earl of Ailesbury. Despite his marriage into a royalist family, Rich emerged as a strong Whig politician.

Parliament of England
Preceded by William Trye; Robert Payne	Member of Parliament for Gloucester; 1698–1701; With: William Selwyn	Succeeded by William Selwyn; John Bridgeman
Preceded by William Aldworth; Thomas Coates	Member of Parliament for Reading; 1689–1698; With: Sir Henry Fane	Succeeded by Sir Owen Buckingham; John Dalby
Preceded by Tanfield Vachell; Sir Owen Buckingham	Member of Parliament for Reading; 1705–1707; With: Sir Owen Buckingham	Succeeded by Parliament of Great Britain
Parliament of Great Britain
Preceded by Parliament of England	Member of Parliament for Reading; 1705–1708; With: Sir Owen Buckingham	Succeeded by Owen Buckingham (younger); Anthony Blagrave
Baronetage of England
Preceded by Thomas Rich	Baronet (of Sunning, Berkshire); 1667–1711	Succeeded by Robert Rich
