= John Powell (1645–1713) =

Member of the Parliament of England for Gloucester

John Powell (1645–1713), of Gloucester, was an English politician and lawyer.

He was elected as Member (MP) of the Parliament of England for Gloucester in 1685.

== Legal career ==
He was appointed as a Baron of the Exchequer in 1691, and transferred to Common Pleas in 1695 and then to Queen's Bench in 1702. He was the judge at one of England's last witchcraft trials, that of Jane Wenham in 1712. He demonstrated scepticism regarding the accused's alleged supernatural activities, but the jury convicted her anyway. She received a pardon.

== Legacy ==
Powell was unmarried and left most of his estate to a niece. He had property at Deerhurst where he reportedly discovered Odda's Dedication Stone, now in the Ashmolean Museum.

He has a memorial in Gloucester Cathedral sculpted by Thomas Green of Camberwell.

Parliament of England
Preceded by Lord Herbert; Sir Charles Berkeley	Member of Parliament for Gloucester; 1685–1689; With: John Wagstaffe	Succeeded by Sir Duncombe Colchester; William Cooke
