= Duncombe Colchester =

English politician

Sir Duncombe Colchester (1630–1694), of Westbury-on-Severn and the Wilderness, Abbinghall, Gloucestershire, was an English politician.

He was a Member (MP) of the Parliament of England for Bere Alston in 1681 and for Gloucester in 1689.

Parliament of England
Preceded by Sir John Trevor; Sir William Bastard	Member of Parliament for Bere Alston; 1681–1685; With: John Elwill	Succeeded by Benjamin Bathurst; Sir John Maynard
Preceded by John Wagstaffe; John Powell	Member of Parliament for Gloucester; 1689–1690; With: William Cooke	Succeeded by William Trye; William Cooke
