= Thomas Webb (Gloucester MP) =

English merchant and Tory politician

Thomas Webb (c. 1663 – 26 March 1734), of Gloucester, was an English merchant and Tory politician who sat in the House of Commons from 1708 to 1713.

Webb was the son of John Webb, merchant and alderman of Gloucester, and his wife Jane Greville, daughter of Giles Greville of Gloucester. He was a mercer of Gloucester and became progressively freeman of Gloucester in 1685, sheriff for the year 1690 to 1691, alderman in 1695 and Mayor of Gloucester for the year 1701 to 1702. From 1702 to 1706, he was receiver-general of land tax for Gloucestershire.

Webb was returned as Member of Parliament (MP) for Gloucester at the 1708 British general election. He was a very inactive Member in the House, presumably because he was involved in supporting the Tories in local affairs for which he was deemed indispensable. He voted against the impeachment of Dr Sacheverell in 1710. On the appointment of the Tory ministry he applied to Harley to be restored to his post as receiver-general, which had been taken from him by the Whigs, but to no avail. He was returned for Gloucester at the 1710 British general election with the support of Dr Knightly Chetwood, dean of the city, and the Duke of Beaufort. He was included as a ‘worthy patriot’ who helped to detect the mismanagements of the previous administration, and as one of the ‘Tory patriots’ who voted for the peace. He was also a member of the October Club. He was frequently absent from Parliament because of corporation affairs. In October 1712 he was issued with an Exchequer writ for £27,000 of land tax receipts which he was alleged to be still holding. The allegation was probably Whig ploy to disrupt the Tories’ electoral arrangements, since it was said that the general understanding was that ‘no receiver in England hath made better payments than Alderman Webb'. He was however persuaded to stand down at the 1713 British general election in favour of a wealthier Tory candidate. However promises of good posts, as a reward, never materialized.

Webb died unmarried on 26 March 1734, aged 71, and he was buried at St Michael's, Gloucester.

Parliament of Great Britain
Preceded by John Hanbury; William Cooke	Member of Parliament for Gloucester; 1708–1713; With: William Cooke to 1709; Francis Wyndham 1709–10; John Blanch from 1710	Succeeded by Charles Coxe; John Snell
