= William Trye =

English politician

William Trye (1660–1717), of Hardwicke, Gloucestershire, was an English politician.

== Life ==
He was the son of Thomas Trye (d. 1671) and Anne (d. 1703), daughter of Richard Jones of Hanham, Gloucestershire. In 1677 he matriculated at St Edmund Hall, Oxford. In 1681 he inherited an estate in Hardwicke, where his family had been established since the fifteenth century, from his grandfather. He also inherited the manor of Haresfield, Gloucestershire, which his grandfather had purchased during the civil war.

In 1682 he was described as being in France. By 1685 he had married Mary (d. 1724), the daughter and co-heiress of Thomas Horne of Horncastle, a township in Hemsworth, Yorkshire.

In 1690 his election as Member (MP) of the Parliament of England for Gloucester was disputed on the grounds that as he was not a freeman he was ineligible, but had rallied the poorer freemen in his support. His election was upheld and he was made a freemen by gift in September 1791. He represented the city in the Tory interest until 1698 and again from 1702 to 1705. In 1709 he stood in a by-election, but following violent scenes during the poll was defeated by the Whig who had the support of most of the corporation.

Following his death on 29 June 1717, a memorial was erected to him and his wife at Hardwicke.

== Children ==
- Thomas (d. 1631) married Mary, daughter of Thomas Norwood of Leckhampton, Gloucestershire. According to Lysons, he 'dissipated the greater part of the inheritance of his ancestors' and was forced to sell Hardwicke to Philip Yorke, 1st Earl of Hardwicke.
- William (d. 1739) and was commemorated at Hardwicke
- Brandon (d. 1728)
- Elizabeth (d. 1733)

Parliament of England
Preceded by Sir Duncombe Colchester; William Cooke	Member of Parliament for Gloucester; 1690–1698; With: William Cooke to 1695; Robert Payne 1695–1698	Succeeded by William Selwyn; Sir William Rich, Bt
Preceded by John Hanbury; Viscount Dursle	Member of Parliament for Gloucester; 1702–1705; With: John Grubham Howe July–December 1702; John Hanbury from December 1702	Succeeded by John Hanbury; William Cooke
