= Charles Cadogan, 2nd Baron Cadogan =

British Army officer and politician

General The Right Honourable The Lord Cadogan

Member of Parliament for Newport, Isle of Wight
- In office 1722–1726 Serving with The Lord Whitworth
- Preceded by: The Earl of March; The Lord Whitworth
- Succeeded by: Sir William Willys; George Huxley

Member of Parliament for Reading
- In office 1716–1722 Serving with Owen Buckingham
- Preceded by: Felix Calvert; Robert Clarges
- Succeeded by: Anthony Blagrave; Clement Kent

Personal details
- Born: Charles Cadogan; 1685
- Died: 24 September 1776 (aged 90–91)
- Party: Whigs
- Spouse: Elizabeth Sloane (m. 1717; died 1768)
- Relations: William Cadogan, 1st Earl Cadogan (brother); Hardress Waller (grandfather)
- Parent(s): Henry Cadogan; Bridget Waller

Military service
- Allegiance: Great Britain
- Branch/service: British Army
- Rank: General
- Unit: Coldstream Guards; 2nd Troop of Horse Guards; King's Own Regiment of Foot; Black Dragoons
- Battles/wars: War of the Spanish Succession: • Battle of Oudenarde • Battle of Malplaquet

General Charles Cadogan, 2nd Baron Cadogan (1684/85 – 24 September 1776) was a British Army officer and Whig politician.

== Early life ==
Cadogan was the younger son of Henry Cadogan of Liscarton, County Meath, and his wife, the former Bridget Waller, second daughter of the regicide Sir Hardress Waller. In 1726, he inherited his title on the death without male issue of his elder brother William Cadogan, 1st Earl Cadogan, whose titles, other than 1st Baron Cadogan, became extinct.

== Career ==
He joined the Army, serving during the War of the Spanish Succession where he saw action at the Battles of Oudenarde and Malplaquet. His career benefited from his brother's close connection to the Army's Captain General the Duke of Marlborough. He rose, by 1715, to the rank of Lieutenant-Colonel in the Coldstream Guards. He was promoted Brigadier-General in 1735, Major-General in 1739, Lieutenant-General in 1745 and full General in 1761. Atterbury describes Cadogan as "a bold, bad, boistrous, blustering, bloody, booby.".

He was given the Colonelcy of the 4th Foot in 1719, transferring in 1734 to be Colonel of the 6th Dragoons until 1742, when he transferred a second time to be Colonel of the 2nd Troop of Horse Guards, a position he then held until his death.

Later, he served as Governor of Sheerness between 1749 and 1752 and Governor of Gravesend and Tilbury Fort from 1752 until his death in 1776.

=== Political career ===
After being defeated in his election to become a Member of Parliament for Reading in 1715, he was returned as a Whig in a by-election in 1716. He acted in Parliament with his brother in support of Sunderland against Walpole and represented Reading until the 1722 election when he was beaten by Tories at Reading. However, was successful at a by-election at Newport, Isle of Wight (his brother being then governor of the Isle of Wight).

Upon his brother's death in 1726, he succeeded to his barony of Cadogan of Oakley, under special remainder, but not to the earldom, and gave up his seat in the House of Commons.

== Personal life ==
On 25 July 1717, Cadogan was married to the heiress Elizabeth Sloane at the Church of St George the Martyr, Queen Square, London. Elizabeth was a daughter of Sir Hans Sloane, 1st Baronet, and the former Elizabeth Langley Rose. Together, they had one son:

- Charles Sloane Cadogan, 1st Earl Cadogan (1728–1807), who married Frances Bromley, a daughter of Henry Bromley, 1st Baron Montfort. After her death, he married Mary Churchill, a daughter of Col. Charles Churchill and Lady Mary Walpole (a daughter of former Prime Minister Robert Walpole). They divorced in 1796.

Through his marriage to Elizabeth, the 250-acre (1.0 km^{2}) Sloane estate in suburban Chelsea was transferred to the Cadogan family in 1753, which has been the basis of the family wealth ever since. (Note: Hans Sloane bought "The Manor of Chelsea" from William Cheyne in 1712 so he could display his great collections at the Manor House (once owned by Henry VIII). The Manor included 11 great houses, a selection of tenements, the advowson of Chelsea Church and 166 acres.) Cadogan became Lord of the manor of Chelsea.

Lady Cadogan died on 20 May 1768. At his death on 24 September 1776, he was the senior general in the British Army.

Parliament of Great Britain
Preceded by Felix Calvert; Robert Clarges	Member of Parliament for Reading; 1716–1722; With: Owen Buckingham	Succeeded by Anthony Blagrave; Clement Kent
Preceded by The Earl of March; The Lord Whitworth	Member of Parliament for Newport, Isle of Wight; 1722–1726; With: The Lord Whitworth	Succeeded by Sir William Willys; George Huxley
Military offices
Preceded by Charles Spencer, 3rd Duke of Marlborough	Colonel of the 2nd Troop of Horse Guards; 1742–1776	Succeeded by Lord Robert Bertie
Preceded by The Earl of Stair	Colonel of the Black Dragoons; 1734–1742	Succeeded by The Earl of Stair
Preceded by Henry Berkeley	Colonel of the King's Own Regiment of Foot; 1719–1734	Succeeded by William Barrell
Preceded by John Huske	Governor of Sheerness; 1749–1752	Succeeded by Sir John Mordaunt
Preceded by The Lord De La Warr	Governor of Gravesend and Tilbury; 1752–1776	Succeeded by William Fawcett
Peerage of Great Britain
Preceded by William Cadogan	Baron Cadogan; 1726–1776	Succeeded by Charles Sloane Cadogan
