= Governor of Chester =

Military role at Chester Castle, 1399–1844

The Governor of Chester was a military officer responsible for the garrison at Chester Castle. The equivalent or related role from the 11th to 14th centuries was Constable of Chester.

== Governors ==
- 1399: John Montagu, 3rd Earl of Salisbury
- 1643: (11 November–) John Byron, 1st Baron Byron
- 1644 (19 May–): William Legge
- 1644: John Marrow (shot by Parliamentary forces)
- 1644: Sir Nicholas Byron (captured during siege)
- 1644: John Byron, 1st Baron Byron
- 1646–?: Michael Jones (Parliamentarian)
- 1647- Col. William Massey of Audlem arrested by mutineers 30 June 1647- (Dore)
- 1650: Robert Dukenfield
- 1650s: Thomas Croxton
- 1659: Richard Dutton
- ?–1660: Robert Venables
- 1660–1663: Sir Evan Lloyd, 1st Baronet
- 1663–1682: Sir Geoffrey Shakerley
- 1682–1689: Peter Shakerley
- 1689–1693: Sir John Morgan, 2nd Baronet
- 1693–1702: Roger Kirkby
- 1702–1705: Peter Shakerley (again)
- 1705–1713: Hugh Cholmondeley, 1st Earl of Cholmondeley
- 1713–1714: Thomas Ashton
- 1714–1725: Hugh Cholmondeley, 1st Earl of Cholmondeley (again)
- 1725–1733: George Cholmondeley, 2nd Earl of Cholmondeley
- 1725–1770: George Cholmondeley, 3rd Earl of Cholmondeley
- 1770–1775: James Cholmondeley
- 1775–1796: Charles Rainsford
- 1796–1844: Edward Morrison

== Lieutenant-governors ==
- 1644: Sir Francis Gamell
- 1705– : Thomas Brooke
- 1712–1713: Thomas Ashton
- 1715–1730: William Newton
- 1731–1770: James Cholmondeley
- 1770–1779: David Home
- 1779–1786: Thomas Fraser
- 1786–1802: William Gunn
- 1802–1817: William Grey
- 1817–1828: Edmund Coghlan
- 1828–1843: Sir John Fraser

== Sources ==
- Firth, Charles Harding (1892), "Legge, William (1609?-1672)", Dictionary of National Biography, London: Smith, Elder & Co, pp. 141–146
- Warburton, Eliot (1849), Memoirs of Prince Rupert and the Cavaliers, vol. 2, London: R. Bentley
