= James Berkeley, 3rd Earl of Berkeley =

English Royal Navy officer and peer

Vice-Admiral The Right Honourable The Earl of Berkeley KG PC
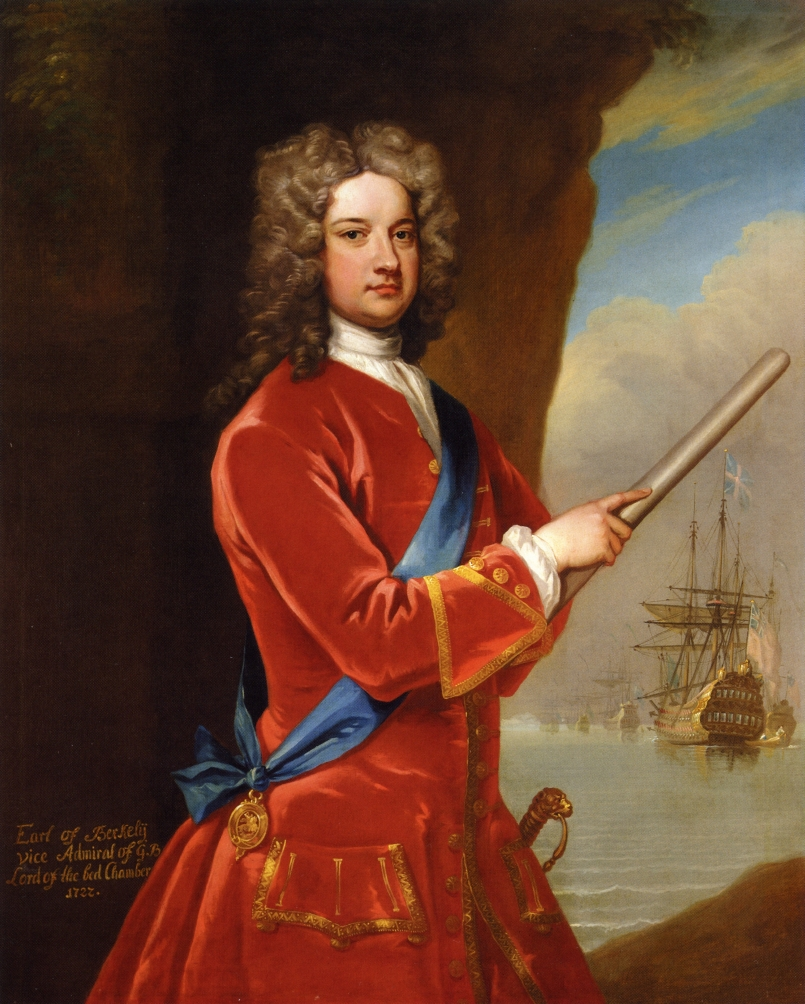
- The 3rd Earl of Berkeley by Godfrey Kneller

First Lord of the Admiralty
- In office 1717–1727
- Monarch: George I
- Preceded by: The Earl of Orford
- Succeeded by: The Viscount Torrington

Personal details
- Born: c. 1679
- Died: 17 August 1736
- Awards: Knight of the Garter

Military service
- Allegiance: Kingdom of Great Britain
- Branch/service: Royal Navy
- Years of service: 1699 - 1727
- Rank: Vice-Admiral
- Commands: HMS Boyne; HMS St George
- Battles/wars: War of the Spanish Succession

Vice-Admiral James Berkeley, 3rd Earl of Berkeley (c. 1679 – 17 August 1736) was an English Royal Navy officer and peer who served as First Lord of the Admiralty from 1717 to 1727. The son of Charles Berkeley, 2nd Earl of Berkeley, he was known by the courtesy title of Viscount Dursley prior to succeeding as Earl of Berkeley in 1710.

Viscount Dursley received his commission as a lieutenant in the Royal Navy on 10 March 1699 and was promoted to captain on 2 April 1701. He was also a Member of Parliament (MP) for Gloucester 1701–1702. He took part in the battle off Málaga under Admiral Rooke, commanding HMS Boyne. He was summoned to Parliament by writ of acceleration as Baron Berkeley on 5 March 1705, and continued to rise in the Navy.

Dursley commanded HMS St George in 1706, and narrowly escaped the Scilly naval disaster in which Sir Cloudesley Shovell in HMS Association was lost on 23 October 1707. The St George ran aground on the same ledge as the Association, but was lifted off with the next wave. It is said that it was Dursley who gave his close friend Shovell the priceless emerald ring which features prominently in some of the legends still told about the disaster. With the death of Sir Clowdisley Shovell, a promotion of flag-officers was made. Rear Admiral Robert Fairfax, was to be commissioned as a Vice Admiral of the Blue (it was signed by the Lord High Admiral and gazetted) but was then cancelled, and Dursley, who was his junior and because of the political influence of his family, made Vice Admiral of the Blue in his stead with seniority of 10 January 1708. Dursley was then promoted to Vice Admiral of the White in late 1708. In April 1709 he recaptured HMS Bristol, which had been taken by the French a short time earlier, but she sank shortly afterwards. Dursley was promoted to Vice Admiral of the Red in December 1709.

With the death of his father on 24 September 1710, Dursley succeeded to his titles and became the 3rd Earl of Berkeley. That year, he was also made High Steward of Gloucester, Warden of the Forest of Dean, Constable of St. Briavel's Castle, and Lord Lieutenant of Gloucestershire, which he held until 1712, and then from 1714 to his death, and Custos Rotulorum of Surrey, which he held until his death. In 1714, besides his restoration to his offices in Gloucestershire, he was made a Lord of the Bedchamber.

He married Lady Louisa Lennox (24 December 1694 – 15 January 1716), daughter of Charles Lennox, 1st Duke of Richmond and Anne Brudenell, on 13 February 1711. They had two children, his wife dying in childbirth:

- - Lt. Col. Augustus Berkeley, 4th Earl of Berkeley (b. 18 February 1715)
- - Lady Elizabeth Berkeley (b. 15 January 1716)

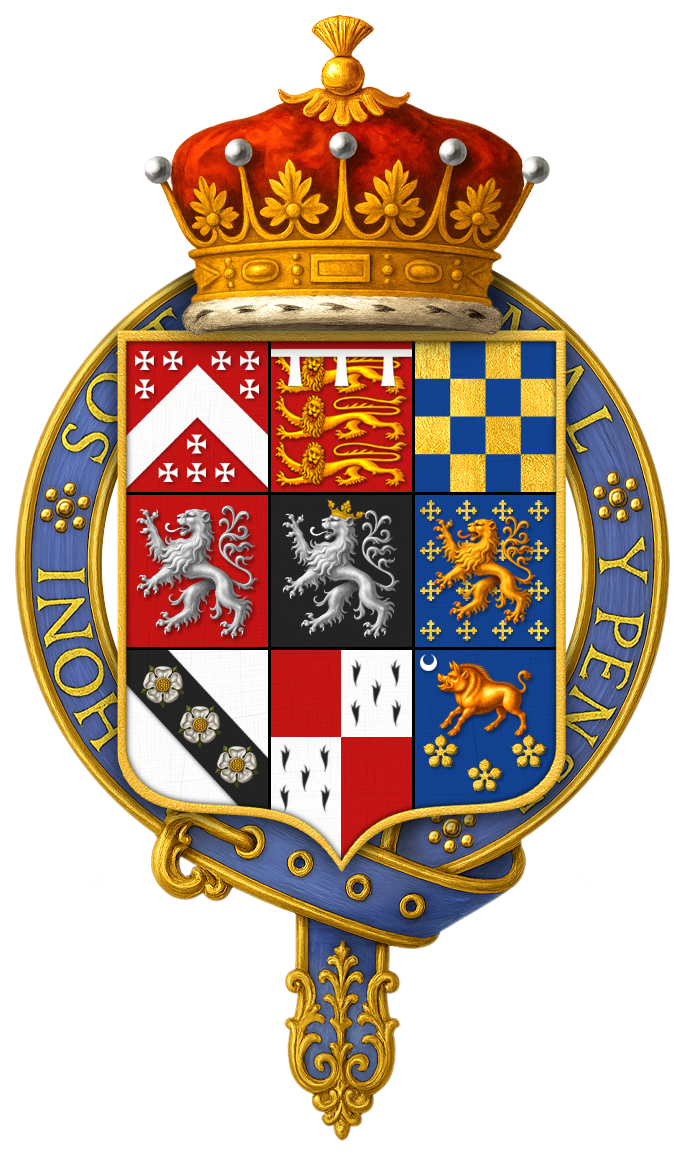
Quartered arms of James Berkeley, 3rd Earl of Berkeley, KG, PC

On 16 May 1717, he was made First Lord of the Admiralty, He also became Vice-Admiral of Great Britain (a civil position with no executive command) and a member of the Privy Council. On 31 March 1718, he was created a Knight of the Garter. He held the supreme post in the Admiralty Board for over a decade, before being dismissed as First Lord of the Admiralty on 2 August 1727, for opposing Sir Robert Walpole, and also left his office as Lord of the Bedchamber at this time. In 1719 he was one of main subscribers in the Royal Academy of Music (1719), a corporation that produced baroque opera on stage.

He died on 17 August 1736 at the Château d'Aubigny, near Coincy, France, and was buried on 31 October 1736 at Berkeley, Gloucestershire. He was succeeded by his son Augustus Berkeley, 4th Earl of Berkeley. His daughter Elizabeth ran away at a very young age and married Anthony Henley in 1728.

Lord Hervey wrote "he was a man of great family and great quality, rough, proud, hard, and obstinate, with excellent good natural parts, but so uncultivated that he was totally ignorant of every branch of knowledge but his profession. He was haughty and tyrannical, but honourable, gallant, observant of his word; equally incapable of flattering a prince, bending to a minister, or lying to anybody he had to deal with."

== Arms ==
Coat of arms of James Berkeley, 3rd Earl of Berkeley
Crest A mitre, gules, labelled and garnished or, charged with a chevron and crosses-patée, as in the arms. Escutcheon Gules a chevron between ten crosses patee, six in chief and four in base, argent. Supporters Two lions, argent, the sinister ducally crowned gules, collared and chained gold. Motto Dieu avec nous (God with us). Orders The Most Noble Order of the Garter - Knight Companion (KG).

Parliament of England
Preceded by William Selwyn; John Bridgeman	Member of Parliament for Gloucester; 1701–1702; With: John Hanbury	Succeeded by John Grobham Howe; William Trye
Political offices
Preceded by The Earl of Orford	First Lord of the Admiralty; 1717–1727	Succeeded by The Viscount Torrington
Honorary titles
Preceded by The Earl of Berkeley	Lord Lieutenant of Gloucestershire; 1710–1712	Succeeded by The Duke of Beaufort
Preceded by The Earl of Berkeley	Custos Rotulorum of Surrey; 1710–1736	Succeeded by The Lord Onslow
Preceded by The Duke of Beaufort	Lord Lieutenant of Gloucestershire; 1714–1736	Succeeded by The Earl of Berkeley
Preceded by John Howe	Vice-Admiral of Gloucestershire; 1715–1736	Succeeded by The Earl of Berkeley
Peerage of England
Preceded by Charles Berkeley	Earl of Berkeley; 1710–1736	Succeeded by Augustus Berkeley
Preceded by Charles Berkeley	Baron Berkeley (writ of acceleration); 1705–1736	Succeeded by Augustus Berkeley
