= Robert Payne (Gloucester MP) =

English politician

Robert Payne (c. 1630 – 1713), of Gloucester, was an English politician.

He was the eldest son of Robert Payne of Gloucester, a clothier.

He was made a freeman of Gloucester in 1653, an alderman in 1679 and made mayor for 1692 and 1703. He was a Member (MP) of the Parliament of England for Gloucester from 1695 to 1698.

He married Anna, the daughter of William Capel of Gloucester, and had 5 sons and 2 daughters.

Parliament of England
Preceded by William Trye; William Cooke	Member of Parliament for Gloucester; 1695–1698; With: William Trye	Succeeded by Sir William Rich, Bt; William Selwyn
