= Governor of Gravesend and Tilbury =

Position in the British Army, 17th–19th century

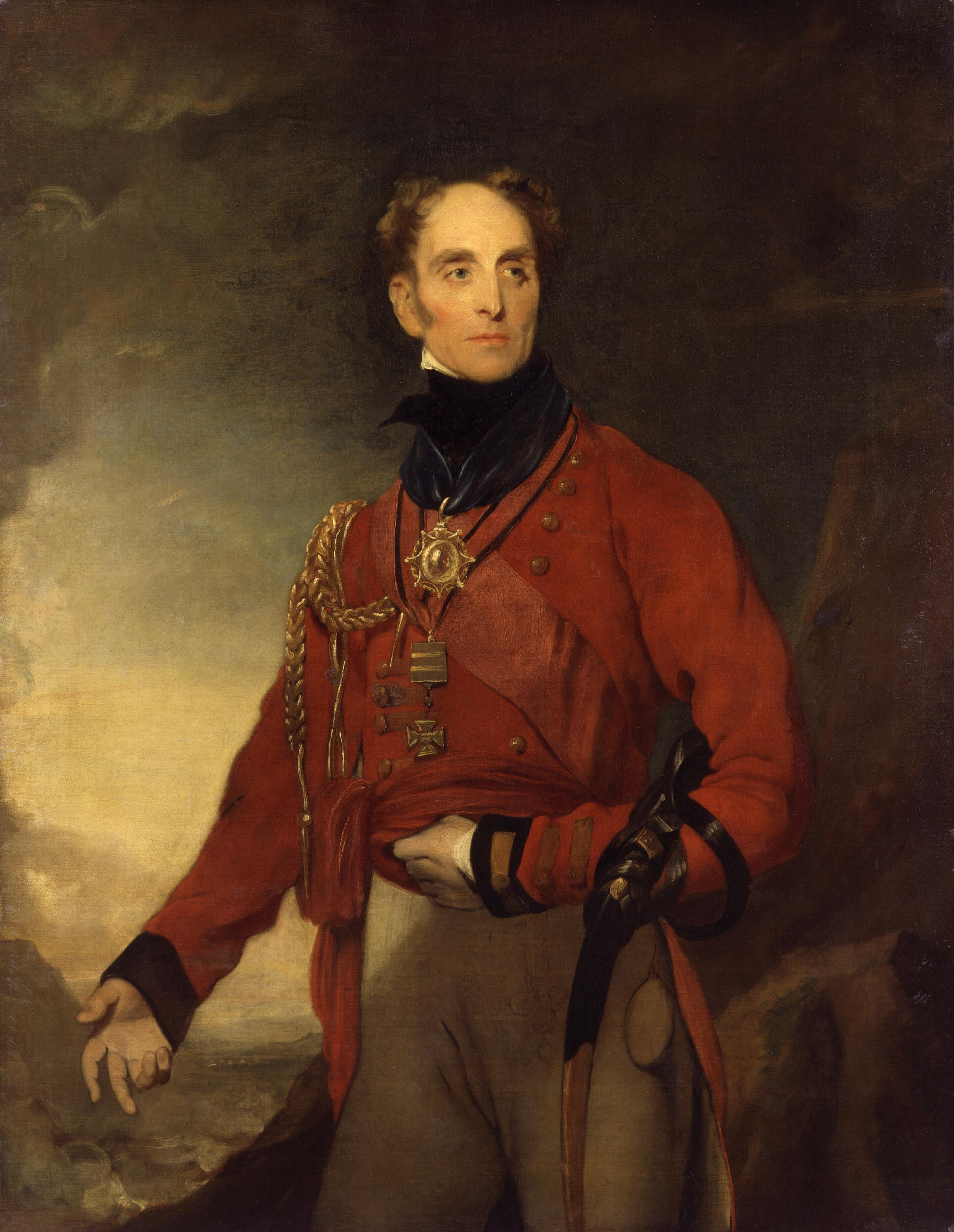
Sir Galbraith Lowry Cole, who served as the governor of Gravesend and Tilbury from 1818 to 1842

The governor of Gravesend and Tilbury was a position in the English and British armies. The officeholder was responsible for overseeing fortifications and blockhouses protecting the River Thames: on the south side of the river at Gravesend, Kent and on the north side at Tilbury Fort and West Tilbury, Essex. The fortifications here date from the time of Henry VIII; Tilbury Fort remained in military use until 1950, but the office of Governor was discontinued upon the death of Sir Lowry Cole in 1842.

== Governors ==
- in 1651: Col. Crompton
- 1662–1669: Sir John Griffith
- 1669–1681: Sir Francis Leke, 1st Baronet (died 1679)
- 1681–1684: Richard Tufton, 5th Earl of Thanet
- 1684–1689: Sackville Tufton
- 1690–1702: William Selwyn
- 1702–1725: George Cholmondeley, 2nd Earl of Cholmondeley
- 1725–1736: William Tatton
- 1736–1737: Sir Multon Lambard
- 1737–1742: James Tyrrell
- 1742–1747: Adam Williamson
- 1747–1752: John West, 1st Baron De La Warr
- 1752–1776: Charles Cadogan, 2nd Baron Cadogan
- 1776–1796: William Fawcett
- 1796–1812: Sir Thomas Musgrave, 7th Baronet
- 1812–1818: Sir John Floyd, 1st Baronet
- 1818–1842: Sir Galbraith Lowry Cole

== Lieutenant-Governors ==
- 1702–1715: John Boteler
- c.1727: Sir Multon Lambard
- 1758–1778: Sir Charles Whitworth
- 1778–1824: Hon. James de Courcy
- 1824–1827: James Hawker
- Oct–Dec 1827: William Guard
- 1827–1832: Paul Anderson
- 1832–1848: Peter Dumas
