= John Hanbury (1664–1734) =

British ironmaster and politician (1664–1734)

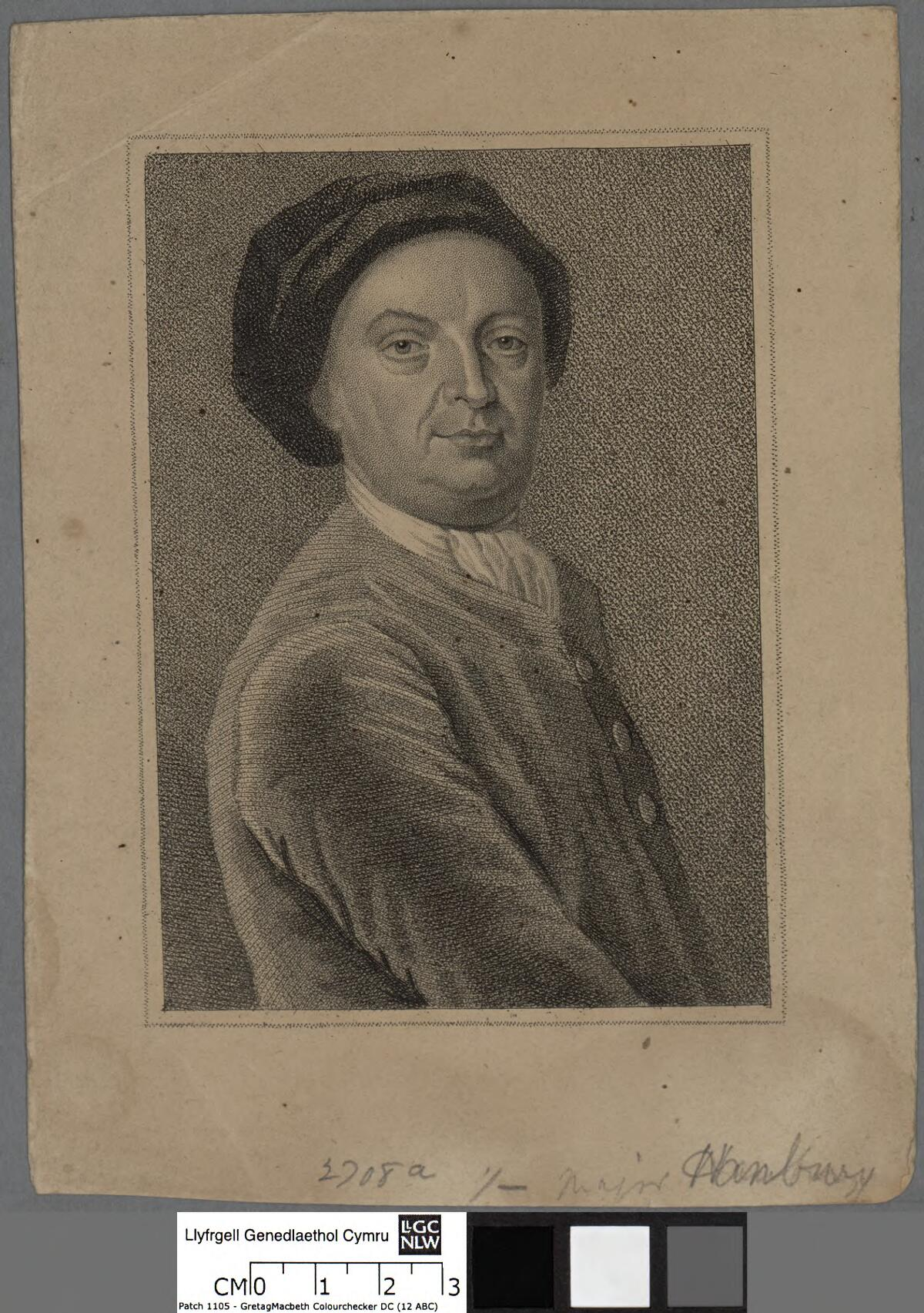
- Born: 1664
- Died: 1734 (aged 69–70)
- Occupations: Businessman, politician
- Spouse: 2
- Children: More than 4
- Parent: Capel Hanbury
- Relatives: William Selwyn (father-in-law)

John Hanbury, Esq. (1664–1734) was a British ironmaster and politician who sat in the House of Commons between 1701 and 1734. He was one of a dynasty of ironmasters responsible for the industrialisation and urbanisation of the eastern valley through which runs the Afon Llwyd (in English "grey river") in Monmouthshire around Pontypool. Hanbury is most notable for introducing the rolling process of tinplating in the early 18th century.

== Background and marriage ==
Hanbury was born into a family ultimately from Hanbury, Worcestershire, and was christened in Gloucester in 1664. Hanbury was the son of Capel Hanbury (1625–1704), who in turn was the third son of the first John Hanbury of Pursall Green.

== Political career ==
Hanbury was returned unopposed as Member of Parliament for Gloucester in December 1701. He did not stand in the 1702 general election but regained the seat in a contested by-election in December 1702. He retained his seat in the 1705 general election but did not stand in 1708.

At the 1715 Hanbury stood for Gloucester again but was defeated. He was eventually returned to Parliament in a by-election in 1720 for the Welsh constituency Monmouthshire. Although a supporter of the Whig party, in his later life he opposed several of Robert Walpole's most important bills. In 1731, he joined with Sir James Lowther and others in opposing the application previously made by William Wood for a royal charter to incorporate a million pound company for his (ineffective) ironmaking enterprise. Lowther referred to Hanbury as having 'the greatest skill as well as works' (i.e. ironworks).

In 1720 he benefited from the legacy of his friend Charles Williams of Caerleon, and with the £70,000 left to him he bought Coldbrook Park near Abergavenny, which subsequently passed to John Hanbury's son Charles Hanbury Williams.

== Business career ==
When his father died in Jan 1704, Hanbury inherited the estate at Pontypool. The estate included ironworks, some of which had long belonged to members of the family. Soon after his father's death he wrote down his observations about his ironworks. He had a blast furnace, forges (probably two), and mills (including a slitting mill) at Pontypool and a further furnace and forge at Llanelly (then in Breconshire). In 1708, he also became interested in the blast furnace at Melin Cwrt, near Neath. Hanbury continued his Pontypool and Llanelly ironworks for the rest of his life and they passed to his descendants with the rest of his Pontypool estate.

The observations included details of the production costs of iron and "Pontpoole plates". Edward Lhwyd in 1697 described the process for making these as involving a rolling mill. Hanbury's Observations do not include tin among the costs, which suggests that his Pontypool plates were blackplate (plates of iron), not tinplate. This is confirmed by its being sold by the ton, not by the box. This may be to prevent the plates rusting that Thomas Allgood, one of Hanbury's managers, began japanning plates as "Pontypool japan". However, the concept of rolling plate iron was probably brought to Pontypool by Thomas Cooke, probably the son of Thomas Cooke, who had worked at Wolverley for Andrew Yarranton, who found out how to produce tinplate by visiting Saxony.

The first production of tinplate at Pontypool seems to date from 1725, when this commodity first appears in the Gloucester Port Books. This immediately follows the first appearance (in French of Réaumur's Principes de l'art de fer-blanc), but prior to a report of it being published in England – millfounded a rolling mill and started a tinplating industry. Hanbury can thus properly be claimed as the progenitor of the British tinplate industry.

== Personal life and death ==
In 1701, he married Albina, daughter of William Selwyn and Albinia daughter of Richard Betenson, and began to enlarge Park House in Pontypool, a property begun by his father in 1659.

In July 1703, he married Bridget Ayscough, eldest daughter of Sir Edward Ayscough of Stallingborough and South Kelsey. With his marriage to Bridget came a fortune of £10,000 and connections with established political families. Bridget was a close friend of Sarah Churchill, Duchess of Marlborough and Hanbury was introduced to influential politicians. Together, they were the parents of:

- John Hanbury of Caerleon, Monmouthshire (1705–1739) dsp.
- Capel Hanbury (1707–1765) MP
- Sir Charles Hanbury (1708–1759) KB, who later took the surname Hanbury-Williams of Coldbrook Park.
- George Hanbury of Coldbrook Park (1715–1764)
- Thomas Hanbury, Commander, Royal Navy (1722–1778)
- And others (dsp)

Hanbury died in 1734.

Parliament of England
Preceded by William Selwyn; John Bridgeman	Member of Parliament for Gloucester; December 1701 – July 1702; With: James Berkley	Succeeded by John Grobham Howe; William Trye
Preceded by John Grobham Howe; William Trye	Member of Parliament for Gloucester; December 1702 – 1708; With: William Trye December 1702–05; William Cooke 1705–08	Succeeded by Thomas Webb; William Cooke
Parliament of Great Britain
Preceded by Thomas Lewis; John Morgan	Member of Parliament for Monmouthshire; 1720–1734; With: Thomas Lewis 1720–22; William Morgan 1722–31; Charles Somerset, 4th Duke of Beaufort 1731–34; Thomas Morgan 1734	Succeeded by Charles Hanbury Williams; Thomas Morgan
