= Julia Peel =

Wife of the British Prime Minister (1795-1859)

Julia Peel Lady Peel
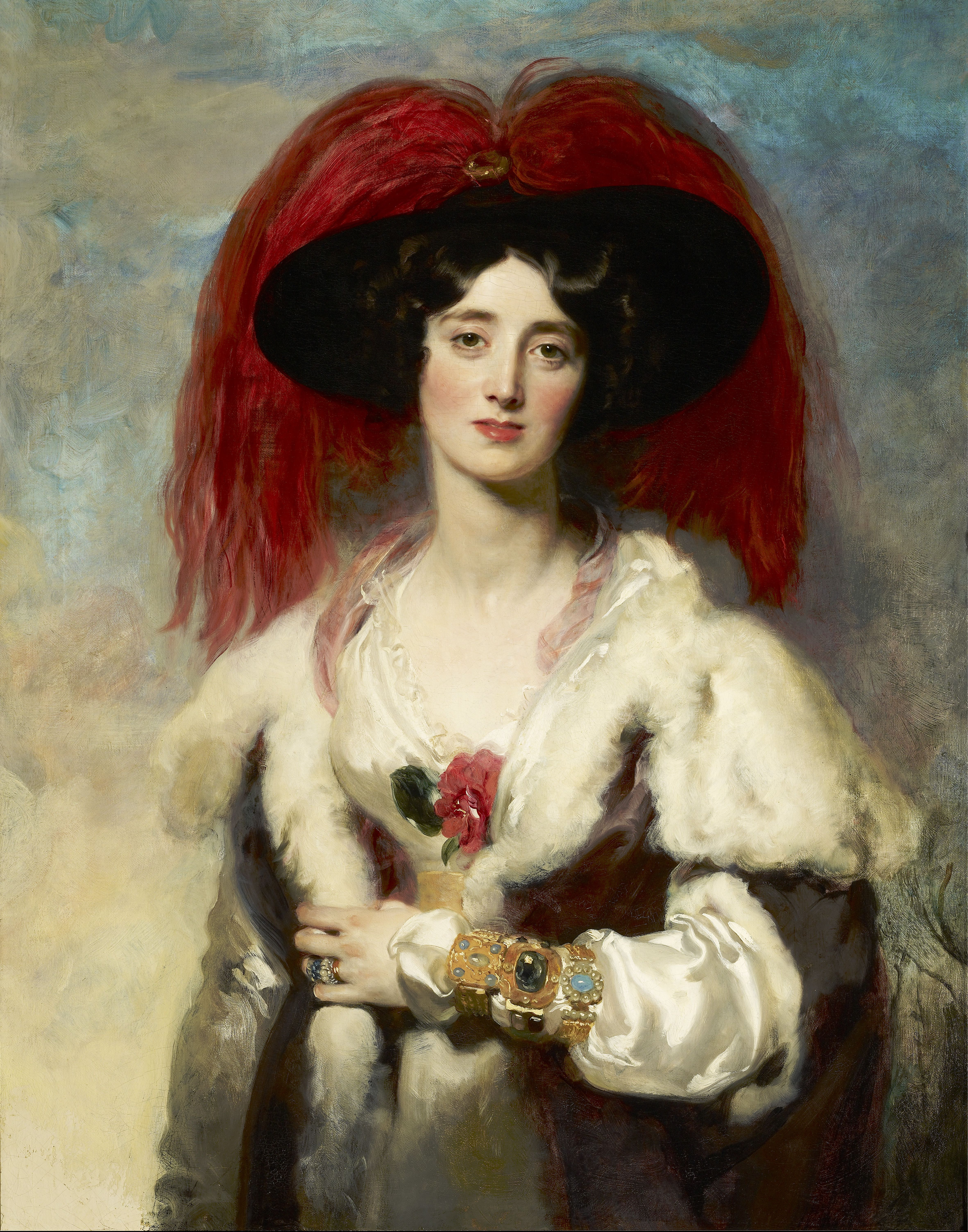
- Portrait of Julia, Lady Peel (1827)
- Born: 19 September 1795; Trichinopoly, Tamil Nadu, British India
- Died: 28 October 1859 (aged 64); Privy Garden, Whitehall, London
- Known for: Wife of the Prime Minister
- Spouse: Robert Peel (m. 1820; died 1850)
- Children: 7
- Parents: Sir John Floyd (father); Rebecca Juliana Darke (mother)

Julia, Lady Peel (née Floyd; 19 September 1795 – 27/28 October 1859) was the wife of the British politician and Prime Minister Robert Peel. She was considered "remarkable for personal beauty" and was captured in the 1827 portrait Portrait of Julia, Lady Peel.

== Early life ==
Julia was born in 1795 in Trichinopoly, Tamil Nadu, British India, the third child of army officer Sir John Floyd, 1st Baronet and his wife, Rebecca Juliana, daughter of merchant Charles Darke. Her father was the Murat of the Third Anglo-Mysore War "and the most dashing cavalry officer of his day." She had an elder sister Miranda, who married Lt.-Gen. Sir Joseph Fuller, and an elder brother, Maj.-Gen. Sir Henry Floyd, 2nd Bt. She had a younger sister, Flavia, born in 1797. Flavia died in 1802, and their mother died of the same illness two days later. Julia then returned to England.

== Marriage ==
She became engaged to Peel, recently the Chief Secretary of Ireland, in March 1820 and the couple married on 8 June that year.

Peel went on to serve twice as Prime Minister from 1834 to 1834 and again from 1841 to 1846 and she functioned as his hostess as Spouse of the prime minister of the United Kingdom. Her husband also spent a number years as Leader of the Opposition along with his ally the Duke of Wellington. He died in 1850 in a horse riding accident.

== Death ==
Lady Peel died suddenly during the night of 27/28 October 1859, at her townhouse in Privy Garden, Whitehall. She had spent the evening with Sarah Villiers, Countess of Jersey; Lady Jersey had been mourning the deaths of both her husband George Child Villiers, 5th Earl of Jersey on 3 October, and their eldest son, George Child Villiers, 6th Earl of Jersey, on 24 October. The 6th Earl of Jersey was Lady Peel's son-in-law, married to her eldest daughter, Julia. Lady Peel had been suffering severe anxiety and was still in mourning over the death of her son Sir William Peel the previous year from smallpox, as well as the death of her husband. The cause of death was believed to be heart attack caused by stress.

== Family ==
Julia Beatrice Peel, her daughter, by Thomas Lawrence, 1828

The Peels had seven children:

- Julia Peel (30 April 1821 – 14 August 1893). She married George Child Villiers, 6th Earl of Jersey, on 12 July 1841. They had five children. She married her second husband, Charles Brandling, on 12 September 1865.
- Sir Robert Peel, 3rd Baronet (4 May 1822 – 9 May 1895). He married Lady Emily Hay on 17 June 1856. They had five children.
- Sir Frederick Peel (26 October 1823 – 6 June 1906). He married Elizabeth Shelley (niece of the poet Percy Shelley through his brother John: died 30 July 1865) on 12 August 1857. He was remarried to Janet Pleydell-Bouverie on 3 September 1879.
- Sir William Peel (2 November 1824 – 27 April 1858), recipient of the Victoria Cross
- John Floyd Peel (24 May 1827 – 21 April 1910). He married Annie Jenny in 1851.
- Arthur Wellesley Peel, 1st Viscount Peel (3 August 1829 – 24 October 1912). He married Adelaide Dugdale, daughter of William Stratford Dugdale and Harriet Ella Portman, on 14 August 1862. They had seven children. In 1895 he became Viscount Peel and was father of the first Earl Peel.
- Eliza Peel (c. 1832 – April 1883). She married Hon. Francis Stonor (son of Thomas Stonor, 3rd Baron Camoys) on 25 September 1855. They had four children.

Her 1827 portrait by Sir Thomas Lawrence, then President of the Royal Academy, is now in the Frick Collection in New York City.

== Bibliography ==
- Gash, Norman. Mr Secretary Peel: The Life of Sir Robert Peel to 1830. Faber & Faber, 2011.
- Lever, Tresham. The Life and Time of Sir Robert Peel. G. Allen & Unwin Limited, 1942.
