= William Fawcett (British Army officer) =

British Army officer

General The Right Honourable Sir William Fawcett KB
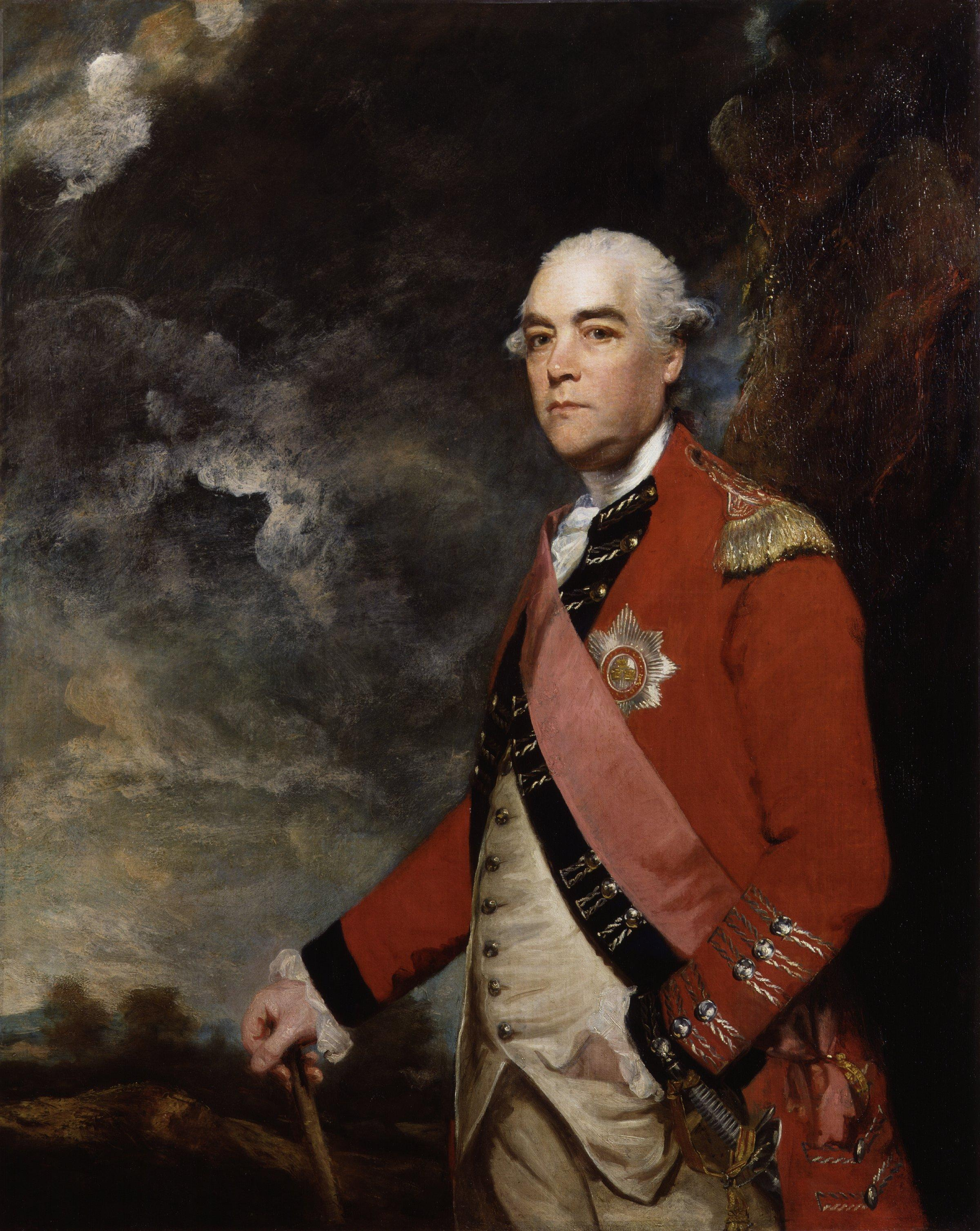
- Portrait by Sir Joshua Reynolds, 1784
- Born: 1727
- Died: 19 March 1804 (aged 76–77)
- Military career
- Allegiance: Great Britain; United Kingdom
- Branch: British Army
- Service years: 1748–1804
- Rank: General
- Conflicts: Seven Years' War; American Revolutionary War
- Awards: Knight Companion of the Order of the Bath

General Sir William Fawcett KB PC (1727 – 19 March 1804) was a British Army officer who served as Adjutant-General to the Forces from 1781 to 1799. During this period Fawcett was the highest authority in the British army, and the most influential officer on the headquarters staff.

== Military career ==
William Fawcett descended from an old family of Yorkshire gentry. He was educated at Bury Grammar School in Lancashire, William Fawcett was commissioned into the 33rd Foot in 1748. In 1758 he was despatched to the War in Germany where he became an Aide-de-Camp to the Marquess of Granby. Then in 1775 he was sent to Hannover, Hesse-Cassel, Hesse-Hanau and Hanover to recruit troops for the War in America. The majority of the German troops who fought on the British side in the conflict were known as the "Hessians" in reference to the place of origin.

He was appointed Adjutant-General to the Forces in 1781: in this role he was involved in introducing Regulations for the Heavy Infantry and then for the Cavalry. In retirement he served as Governor of the Royal Hospital Chelsea from 1796 until 1804. He was appointed a member of the Privy Council on 23 January 1799. He lived at 31 Great George Street in London. He died on 19 March 1804; and his funeral was honoured with the presence of his Royal Highness the Prince of Wales, their Royal Highnesses the Dukes of York, Clarence, Kent, and Cambridge.

== Family ==
In 1749 he married Susannah Brook and together they had eight children. Following her death on 7 April 1783 he married Charlotte Stinton (d. 1805): they had no children.

== See also ==
- List of military leaders in the American Revolutionary War

Military offices
Preceded by The Lord Cadogan	Governor of Gravesend and Tilbury; 1776–1796	Succeeded by Thomas Musgrave
Preceded by The Earl of Cavan	Colonel of the 15th (the Yorkshire East Riding) Regiment of Foot; 1778–1792	Succeeded by James Inglis Hamilton
Preceded by William Amherst	Adjutant General; 1781–1799	Succeeded by Sir Harry Calvert
Preceded by Richard Burton Phillipson	Colonel of the 3rd (Prince of Wales's) Dragoon Guards; 1792–1804	Succeeded by Richard Vyse
Preceded by The Marquess Townshend	Governor, Royal Hospital Chelsea; 1796–1804	Succeeded by Sir David Dundas
