= John Bridgeman (died 1729) =

English politician (c.1655–1729)

John Brigeman

Member of Parliament for Gloucester
- In office February 1701 – November 1701

Personal details
- Born: 1655
- Died: 1729 (aged 73–74)

John Bridgeman (c. 1655–1729), of Prinknash Park, Gloucestershire, was an English politician.

He was a Member (MP) of the Parliament of England for Gloucester February to November 1701. He married the daughter of Sir Charles Berkeley who inherited the Berkeley estates in Gloucestershire. On his death in 1729 his widow took charge of lands around Gloucester including what is now Prinknash Abbey.

Parliament of the United Kingdom
Preceded by William Selwyn; Sir William Rich, Bt	Member of Parliament for Gloucester; January–December 1701; With: William Selwyn	Succeeded by Viscount Dursley; John Hanbury
