= William Selwyn (British Army officer) =

Governor of Jamaica
- In office January 1702 – 6 April 1702

Personal details
- Born: 1655
- Died: April 1702 (aged 46–47) Jamaica
- Spouse: Albinia Betensen

Major General William Selwyn (1655 – 6 April 1702) was an officer in the British Army, MP and briefly Governor of Jamaica.

== Early life ==
He was the 5th and eldest surviving son of William Selwyn of Matson, Gloucestershire and Margaret, the daughter of Edward Nourse of Gloucester and was educated at Oriel College, Oxford, matriculating on 11 April 1674.

== Military career ==
Selwyn served in the Army of the United Provinces of the Netherlands, in the time of King Charles II. He served at the head of his regiment at the Battle of Landen on 29 July 1693, distinguishing himself under the eye of the King William III. He then took part at the siege of Namur in the summer of 1695 and was promoted to the rank of brigadier general during the siege.

He became Mayor of Gloucester in 1675. He inherited Matson House, seat of the Selwyn family, in Matson, Gloucester, in 1679 on the death of his father.

He was elected MP for Gloucester in 1698, sitting until 1701. Although he was naturally a Whig, being from the Gloucester countryside, Selwyn was on duty at the execution of William, Lord Russell, the leader of the Country Party.

Selwyn was appointed Governor of Jamaica in January, 1702, but died there three months later, in the year of his 47th birthday. His body was transported back to England to be buried at Matson. He had married Albinia, daughter of Richard Betensen and Albinia, daughter of Christopher Wray on 26 May 1681 at Westminster Abbey with whom he had 4 sons and 3 daughters. Their eldest son John and a younger son Charles both became MPs.

Political offices
Preceded by Duncomb Colchester	Mayor of Gloucester; 1675	Succeeded by William Russel
Parliament of England
Preceded by William Trye; Robert Payne	Member of Parliament for Gloucester; 1698–1701; With: Sir William Rich 1698–1701; John Bridgeman	Succeeded by Viscount Dursley; John Hanbury
Military offices
Unknown	Captain and lieutenant colonel in the Second Foot Guards; 1688	Unknown
Preceded by Hon. Sackville Tufton	Governor of Gravesend and Tilbury; 1690–1702	Succeeded by Hon. George Cholmondeley
Preceded by Percy Kirke	Colonel of the Queen Dowager's Regiment of Foot; 1691–1701	Succeeded by Sir Henry Bellasis
Preceded by Sir Henry Bellasis	Colonel of 22nd Regiment of Foot; 1701–1702	Succeeded by Thomas Handasyde
Preceded by Sir William Beeston	Governor of Jamaica; 1702	Succeeded by Peter Beckford
