= Robert Clarges =

English politician

Robert Clarges (c. 1693 – before April 1727) was an English Tory politician who briefly served in the House of Commons.

Clarges was the third son of Sir Walter Clarges, 1st Baronet, and the first child from his marriage to Elizabeth, daughter of Sir Thomas Gould, a former Sheriff of London, and widow of Sir Robert Wymondsell. He was educated at St Paul's School, London and later attended Trinity College, Cambridge.

When his father died in 1706, Clarges was still underage. His inheritance, the Rectory Manor of Stoke Poges, was held in trust until he reached adulthood.

In the 1713 general election, he was elected as Member of Parliament for Reading. Although aligned with the Tory party, he was seen as someone who might occasionally vote with the Whigs. He voted against the Septennial Act 1716. His election was declared void on 30 May 1716.

Clarges never married and is believed to have died sometime before April 1727, as he was not named in his mother's will dated that month. His estate was managed by his mother and elder brother. The Rectory Manor eventually passed to his brother George.

== Notes ==
Parliament of England
Preceded by Owen Buckingham; John Dalby	Member of Parliament for Reading; 1713 – 1716; With: Felix Calvert	Succeeded by Charles Cadogan; Owen Buckingham
