= Felix Calvert =

English Tory MP

Felix Calvert (c. 1664 – 28 December 1736) of Marcham in Berkshire (now Oxfordshire) was an English Tory MP.

Calvert was the first son of the brewer Thomas Calvert of St. Giles, Cripplegate, London and of Anne, daughter of William Ambose of Reading. He married Mary, daughter of Sir Francis Winnington, MP of Stanford Court, Worcester and Solicitor-General to Charles II. He succeeded his father in 1668, bought the manor of Marcham in Berkshirein 1691 and was pricked High Sheriff of Berkshire for 1707–08. He bought Albury Hall in Hertfordshire in 1700 and sold Marcham in 1717 to Robert Meggot, a wealthy Southwark brewer.

He was MP for Reading from 1713 to 30 May 1716. Calvert was described as a Tory who might often vote Whig. He voted against the Septennial Act 1716. His election was declared void on 30 May 1716 and he was unsuccessful in the ensuing by-elections on 6 June 1716 and in March 1720.

He died in 1736, leaving 7 sons and 5 daughters. Albury Hall passed to his son Felix.

== Notes ==
Parliament of England
Preceded by Owen Buckingham; John Dalby	Member of Parliament for Reading; 1713–1716; With: Robert Clarges	Succeeded by Charles Cadogan; Owen Buckingham
