= Robert Cholmondeley =

Robert Cholmondeley may refer to:

- Robert Cholmondeley, 1st Earl of Leinster (1584–1659), English Royalist during the English Civil War
- Robert Cholmondeley, 1st Viscount Cholmondeley (died 1681), English peer
