= William Cooke (died 1703) =

English politician

High Sheriff of Gloucestershire Verderer of the Forest of Dean Mayor of Gloucester Member of Parliament

Personal details
- Born: c. 1620
- Died: 1703
- Spouse: Anne Rolle
- Relations: Sir Robert Cooke (father)
- Education: Gray's Inn

William Cooke (c. 1620 – 1703), of Highnam Court, Gloucestershire, was an English politician. He was a Member (MP) of the Parliament of England for Gloucester in 1679 and 1689 to 1695.

== Biography ==
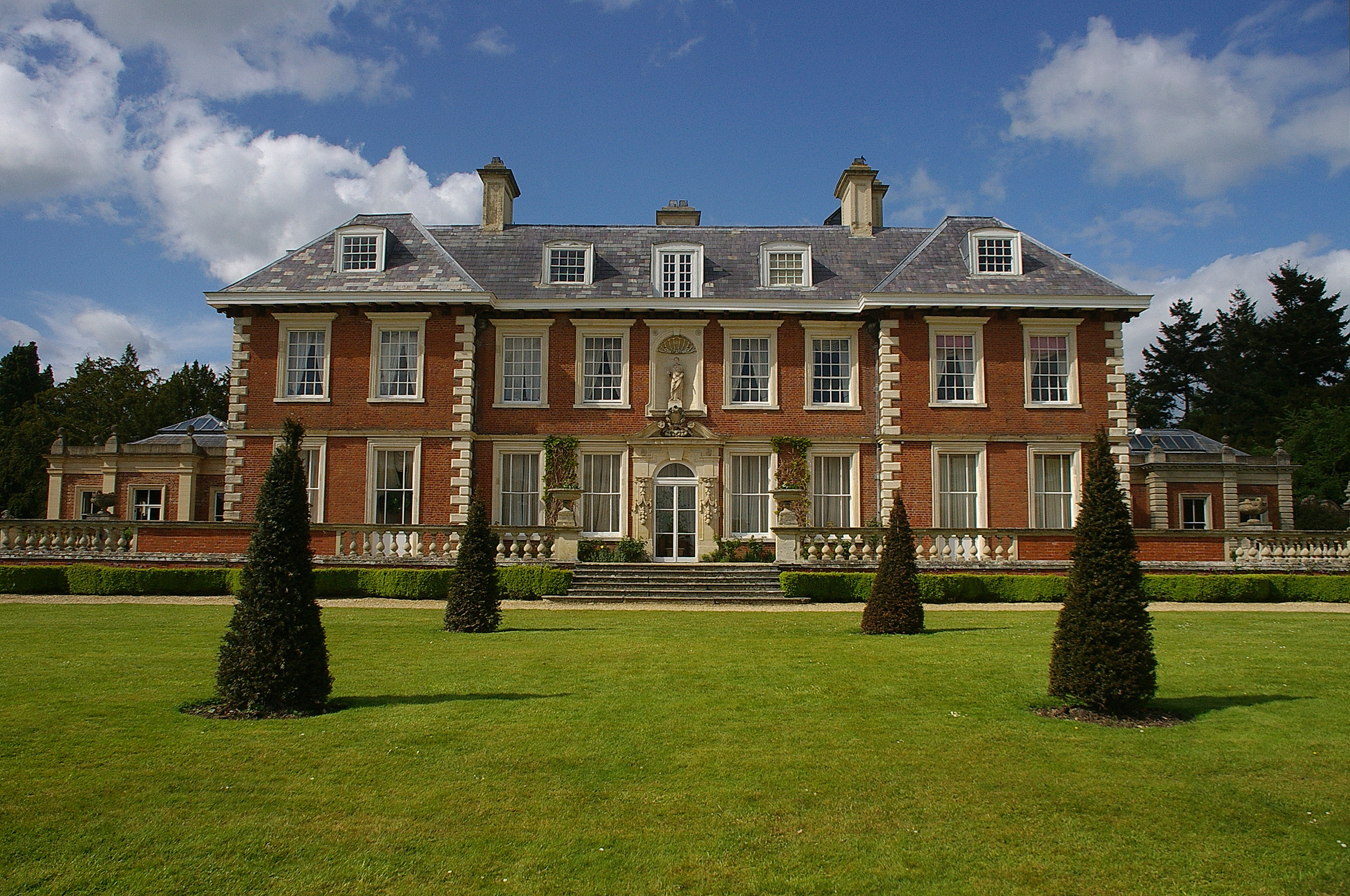
Highnam Court

William Cooke, the eldest son of Sir Robert Cooke of Highnam Court and his first wife Dorothy Fleetwood, was born c. 1620. His mother was the daughter of Sir Miles Fleetwood of Aldwinkle, Northamptonshire, Receiver of the Court of Wards, and his wife Ann Luke. His younger brother, Edward Cooke, was a Member of Parliament for Tewkesbury.

Cooke was admitted to Gray's Inn in 1636. His father's political affiliations drew the ire of the Royalists during the English Civil War. The family manor at Highnam was attacked by the Royalists, and the elder Cooke withdrew with his family to Gloucester, where he died that same year, in 1643. William Cooke succeeded his father to the manor of Highnam, which was just west of Gloucester. The Cooke family had been at Highnam Court since 1597, when his grandfather, Sir William Cooke, married heiress Joyce Lucy, daughter of Sir Thomas Lucy.

On 30 March 1648, Cooke married Anne Rolle, daughter of Dennis Rolle of the manor of Stevenstone in Devon. The couple had nine sons and seven daughters. After the civil war ended, William Cooke began rebuilding Highnam Court, which had been demolished in the attacks. The manor at Highnam was built in 1658. While its architect is unknown, it is believed that it was designed by Inigo Jones or his student, Francis Carter.

Cooke served as High Sheriff of Gloucestershire in 1663. That year, his wife died. She was interred adjacent to the small chapel that had been built five decades previously by Cooke's grandfather, Sir William Cooke, near the southwest corner of the house. In 1668, both Cooke and Edward Cooke held office as two of the four Verderers of the Forest of Dean; both retained that position for many years, although there is some disagreement as to whether the Edward in question was William's son or brother.

He became a freeman and alderman for Gloucester in 1672. He was a Commissioner of Inquiry for the Forest of Dean in 1673, 1679, 1683, and 1691. Cooke served as Mayor of Gloucester three times. He was first elected in 1673, serving until 1674. His second term started in November 1688, following the resignation of the Roman Catholic mayor, and continued until the following year. In April 1699, the mayoral incumbent died, and Cooke assumed the office of mayor for the third time, until September of that year.

William Cooke was elected to the House of Commons, as Member of Parliament for Gloucester, and served from March 1679 to July 1679 and, again, from 1689 to 1695. Both Cooke and his son Edward were put on the Royal Commission of 1692. William Cooke died in 1703, and was succeeded by his son Edward.

Parliament of England
Preceded by Henry Norwood; Evan Seys	Member of Parliament for Gloucester; February–September 1679; With: Evan Seys	Succeeded by Sir Charles Berkeley; Evan Seys
Preceded by John Powell; John Wagstaffe	Member of Parliament for Gloucester; 1689–1695; With: Sir Duncombe Colchester 1689–90; William Trye from 1690	Succeeded by Robert Payne; William Trye
