= Owen Buckingham (died 1713) =

English merchant, alderman, MP and Lord Mayor of London

Sir Owen Buckingham
- Born: c. 1649
- Died: 20 March 1713
- Spouses: 6
- Children: 3, including Owen
- Father: George Buckingham

Sir Owen Buckingham (c. 1649 – 20 March 1713) was an English merchant, alderman, MP and Lord Mayor of London.

He was born the son of George Buckingham, an innkeeper of Stanwell, Middlesex. By 1680 he was a liveryman in the Butchers’ Company of the City of London and by 1692 a liveryman of the Salter's Company.

He became involved in local city politics and was a common councilman for London in 1689–90 and 1691–1696 and an alderman from 1696 to his death. He was appointed Sheriff of London for 1695–96, knighted the same year and elected Lord Mayor of London for 1704–05. In 1697 he was Colonel of the Blue Regiment, London Trained Bands.

As a result of a promise to manufacture sailcloth in the town he was elected MP for Reading in 1698, and again in 1701, 1702 and 1705, giving up the seat in 1708 in favour of his son, also Owen Buckingham.

By virtue of his own enterprise and a succession of favourable marriages he became quite wealthy and by 1706 had purchased the Fettiplace family estates at Earley near Reading in Berkshire.

He died in 1713. He had married 6 times but was survived by only the one son and heir Owen and two daughters from his first marriage.

== Notes ==
Parliament of England
| Preceded by Sir Henry Fane; Sir William Rich, Bt | Member of Parliament for Reading; 1698–1701; With: John Dalby; Francis Knollys | Succeeded by Anthony Blagrave; Tanfield Vachell |
| Preceded by Anthony Blagrave; Tanfield Vachell | Member of Parliament for Reading; 1702–1707; With: Tanfield Vachell; Sir William Rich, Bt | Succeeded by Parliament of Great Britain |
Parliament of Great Britain
| Preceded by Parliament of England | Member of Parliament for Reading; 1707–1708; With: Sir William Rich, Bt | Succeeded by Anthony Blagrave; Owen Buckingham (son) |
Civic offices
| Preceded by Sir John Parsons | Lord Mayor of London; 1704–1705 | Succeeded by Sir Thomas Rawlinson |
