= George Cholmondeley, 2nd Earl of Cholmondeley =

British Army general

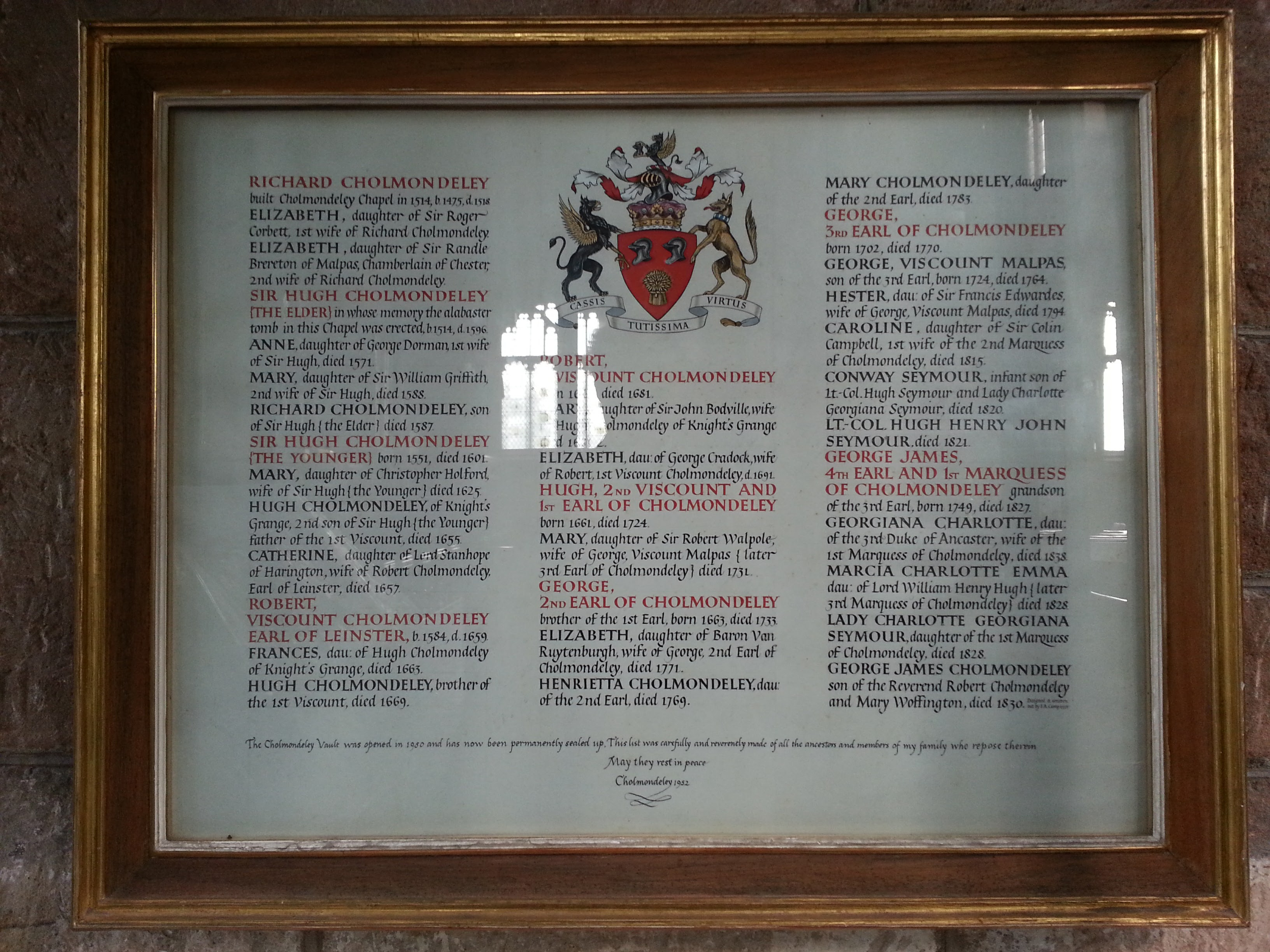
Cholmondeley's listing in the family vault at St Oswald's Church, Malpas

George Cholmondeley, 2nd Earl of Cholmondeley, PC, FRS (1666 – 7 May 1733), styled The Honourable from birth until 1715 and then known as Lord Newborough to 1725, was an English soldier.

Cholmondeley was the second son of Robert Cholmondeley, 1st Viscount Cholmondeley, and Elizabeth Cradock. His elder brother, Hugh Cholmondeley, 1st Earl of Cholmondeley, inherited the family titles and estates, while George pursued a career in military and public service. He was educated at Westminster School and Christ Church, Oxford. During the Glorious Revolution, he supported the claims of William of Orange and Mary to the English throne.

Following their accession, he was appointed a Groom of the Bedchamber, beginning his long association with the Williamite and later Hanoverian political establishment.

== Military and political career ==
Following the accession of William III and Mary II, Cholmondeley emerged as a supporter of the Williamite regime during the Williamite War in Ireland. In 1690 he commanded the Horse Grenadier Guards at the Battle of the Boyne, one of the decisive engagements of the conflict between the forces of William III and the deposed James II. Two years later he fought at the Battle of Steenkerque in the Nine Years' War, where English and allied forces under William III engaged the French army in the Spanish Netherlands.

Alongside his military career, Cholmondeley also entered Parliament and represented Newton in the House of Commons from 1690 to 1695. During this period he became increasingly associated with the Whig political establishment that supported the post-1688 constitutional settlement and the Hanoverian succession.

Cholmondeley continued to advance steadily within the British Army during the late seventeenth and early eighteenth centuries. He was promoted to Brigadier-General in 1697, to Major-General in 1702, and to Lieutenant-General in 1704. In 1727 he attained the rank of full general, reflecting his long service within the military and political structure of the early Hanoverian state.

== Political offices and peerages ==
Cholmondeley was admitted to the Privy Council in 1706, reflecting his growing prominence within the Whig and later Hanoverian political establishment. In 1715, shortly after the accession of George I, he was raised to the Peerage of Ireland as Baron Newborough, of Newborough in the County of Wexford. The following year he was created Baron Newburgh, of Newburgh in the County of Anglesea, in the Peerage of Great Britain.

In 1725 Cholmondeley succeeded his elder brother as second Earl of Cholmondeley, inheriting both the title and a number of important regional offices. He subsequently served as Lord Lieutenant of Cheshire, Anglesey, Caernarvonshire, Denbighshire, Flintshire, Merionethshire, and Montgomeryshire. These positions made him one of the crown's principal representatives in both Cheshire and North Wales, with responsibilities that included militia oversight, local administration, and the maintenance of political loyalty to the Hanoverian regime.

== Family ==
Lord Cholmondeley married Anna Elizabeth van Ruytenburgh (c. 1672 – London, 16 January 1722), daughter of Aelbert Heer van Ruytenburgh (1630–1688) and Wilhelmina Anna van Nassau (1638–1688), around 1701. They had three sons and three daughters:

- James Cholmondeley (b. 30 November 1700), died young
- Lady Henrietta Cholmondeley (26 November 1701 – 1769), died unmarried
- George Cholmondeley, 3rd Earl of Cholmondeley (1703–1770)
- Lady Elizabeth Cholmondeley (28 May 1705 – 1762), married Edward Warren (died 1737) on 23 January 1730/1
- Gen. Hon. James Cholmondeley (1708–1775)
- Lady Mary Cholmondeley (9 March 1713/4 – 1783), died unmarried

He died on 7 May 1733 and was succeeded in his titles by his eldest son George.

Parliament of England
| Preceded by Sir John Chicheley; Francis Cholmondeley | Member of Parliament for Newton; 1690–1695; With: Sir John Chicheley 1690–1691; John Bennet 1691–1695 | Succeeded by Legh Banks; Thomas Brotherton |
Military offices
| New regiment | Captain and Colonel of the 1st Troop Horse Grenadier Guards; 1693–1715 | Succeeded by Lord Lumley |
| Preceded by William Selwyn | Governor of Gravesend and Tilbury; 1702–1725 | Succeeded by William Tatton |
| Preceded by The Earl of Arran | Captain and Colonel of the 3rd Troop of Horse Guards; 1715–1733 | Succeeded by The Earl of Albemarle |
| Preceded by The Earl of Cholmondeley | Governor of Chester; 1725–1733 | Succeeded by The Earl of Cholmondeley |
| Preceded by Thomas Stanwix | Governor of Kingston-upon-Hull; 1725–1732 | Succeeded by Edward Montagu |
| Preceded by Daniel Harvey | Governor of Guernsey; 1732–1733 | Succeeded by Richard Sutton |
Honorary titles
| Preceded by The Earl of Cholmondeley | Lord-Lieutenant of Cheshire, Anglesey, Caernarvonshire, Flintshire, Merionethshire and Montgomeryshire; 1725–1733 | Succeeded by The Earl of Cholmondeley |
| Preceded by The Earl of Cholmondeley | Vice-Admiral of Cheshire; 1725–1733 | Succeeded by The Earl of Cholmondeley |
| Preceded by The Earl of Cholmondeley | Lord Lieutenant of Denbighshire; 1725–1733 | Succeeded by Sir Robert Salusbury Cotton, Bt |
Peerage of England
| Preceded by Hugh Cholmondeley | Earl of Cholmondeley; 1725–1733 | Succeeded by George Cholmondeley |
Peerage of Great Britain
| New creation | Baron Newburgh; 1716–1733 | Succeeded by George Cholmondeley |
Peerage of Ireland
| New creation | Baron Newborough; 1715–1733 | Succeeded by George Cholmondeley |
