= Charles Berkeley, 2nd Earl of Berkeley =

British nobleman and diplomat

Charles Berkeley, 2nd Earl of Berkeley, KB, PC, FRS (8 April 1649 – 24 September 1710) was a British nobleman and diplomat, known as Sir Charles Berkeley from 1661 to 1679 and styled Viscount Dursley from 1679 to 1698.

== Life ==
The son of George Berkeley, 1st Earl of Berkeley, he was educated at Christ Church, Oxford and Trinity College, Cambridge, was created a Knight of the Bath for the coronation of Charles II in 1661, and received his Master of Arts from Oxford on 28 September 1663. On 21 November 1667, he was elected a Fellow of the Royal Society.

Berkeley adopted the styling Viscount Dursley in September 1679, when his father was raised to the earldom. He had just been elected as MP for Gloucester, for which he sat in the last two Parliaments of Charles II, in 1679 and 1681. He did not stand again, in part due to conflict with the Tory corporation of the city. Dursley followed his father in opposing James II in the Glorious Revolution, and enjoyed a number of appointments thereafter. Called up to the House of Lords as Baron Berkeley in July 1689, he was then sent as Envoy Extraordinary to Spain in May 1689, and as Ambassador to the United Provinces from August 1689 to 1695. He also received the post of Custos Rotulorum of Gloucestershire, previously held by his father, in July 1689. On 3 May 1694, he was made a Privy Councillor, and on 25 May, was appointed Lord Lieutenant of Gloucestershire. In the following year, Dursley was appointed High Steward of the City of Gloucester, and Constable of St Briavel's Castle on 18 June 1697. In 1697, as lord-lieutenant, he was Colonel of the Gloucester Militia Horse.

Berkeley succeeded to the earldom in 1698, and also received his father's office of Custos Rotulorum of Surrey in February 1699. His eldest son, Charles, Viscount Dursley, died of smallpox in May, and his daughter, Lady Penelope, in September of that same year, both while Berkeley and his family were in Dublin during his tenure as one of the Lords Justices (1699–1700). On 7 June 1702, Berkeley's appointment as Constable was renewed, and he was appointed Lord Lieutenant of Surrey and Warden of the Forest of Dean. He died in 1710, and was succeeded to the posts of Earl of Berkeley, Lord Lieutenant of Gloucestershire, and Custos Rotulorum of Gloucestershire by his eldest surviving son, James, a naval officer.

== Family ==
Berkeley married Hon. Elizabeth Noel, daughter of Baptist Noel, 3rd Viscount Campden, on 16 August 1677, and they had four sons and three daughters:

- Charles Berkeley, Viscount Dursley (17 June 1679 – May 1699)
- James Berkeley, 3rd Earl of Berkeley (aft. 1679 – 1736)
- Col. Hon. Henry Berkeley (1690? – May 1736), married Mary Cornewall and had issue
- Hon. George Berkeley (aft. 1680 – 1746), married Henrietta Howard, Countess of Suffolk, no issue

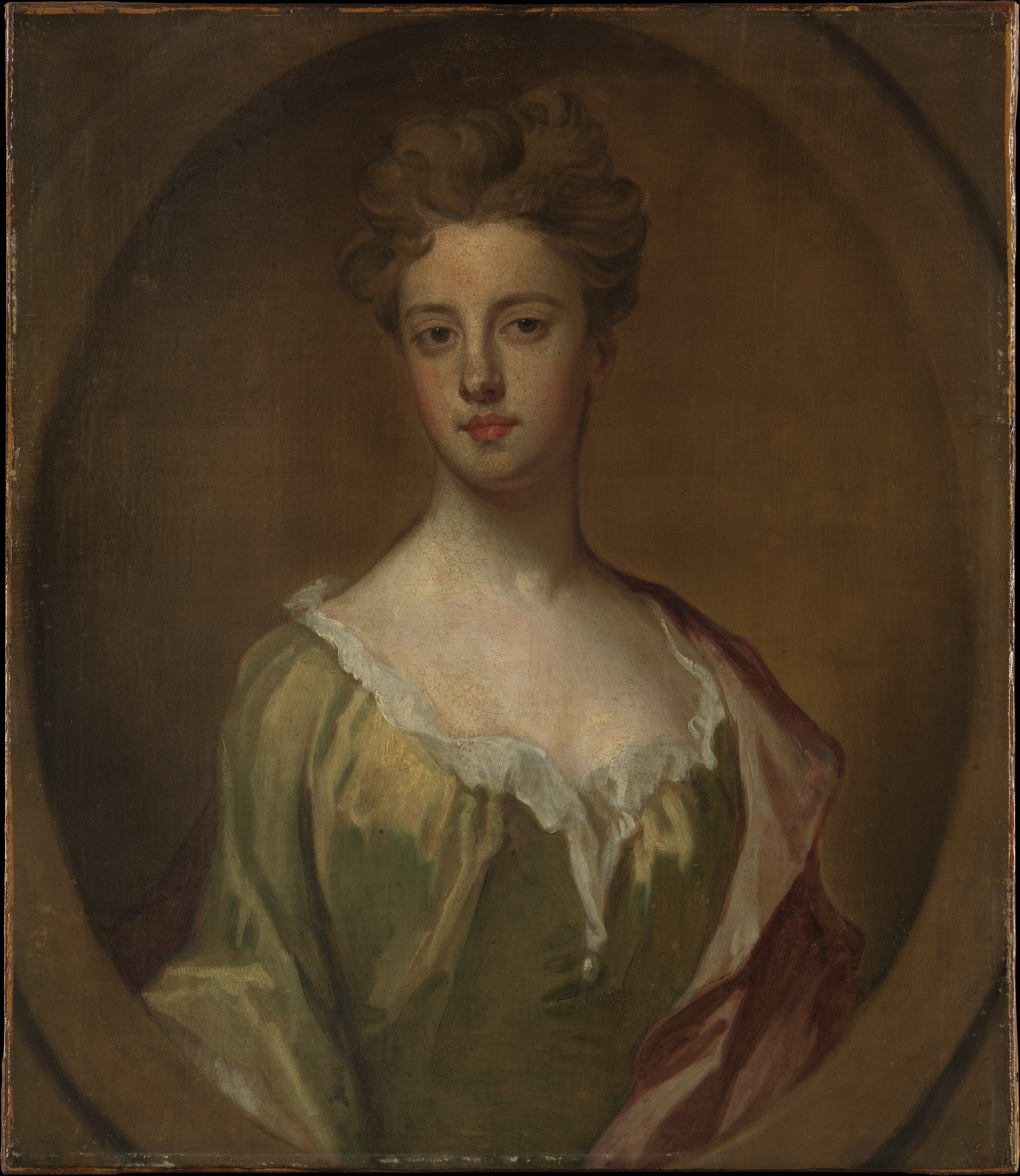
Lady Mary Berkeley

- Lady Mary Berkeley, married Thomas Chambers (son of Sir Thomas Chambers) and had issue:
  - Mary Chambers, married Vere Beauclerk, 1st Baron Vere
  - Anne Chambers, married Richard Grenville-Temple, 2nd Earl Temple
- Lady Elizabeth Berkeley (d. 16 September 1769), married Sir John Germain, 1st Baronet, no issue
- Lady Penelope Berkeley (d. 3 September 1699)

His widow, then the Dowager Countess of Berkeley, funded the rebuilding of St Dunstan's Church, Cranford, and provision of a marble font, in 1716.

== Arms ==
Coat of arms of Charles Berkeley, 2nd Earl of Berkeley
Crest A mitre, gules, labelled and garnished or, charged with a chevron and crosses-patée, as in the arms. Escutcheon Gules a chevron between ten crosses patee, six in chief and four in base, argent. Supporters Two lions, argent, the sinister ducally crowned gules, collared and chained gold. Motto Dieu avec nous (God with us). Orders The Most Honourable Order of the Bath - Knight (KB).

Parliament of England
Preceded by William Cooke; Evan Seys	Member of Parliament for Gloucester; 1679–1681; With: Evan Seys 1679; Lord Herbert 1681	Succeeded by John Wagstaffe; John Powell
Honorary titles
Preceded by The 1st Earl of Berkeley	Custos Rotulorum of Gloucestershire; 1689–1710	Succeeded by The 3rd Earl of Berkeley
Preceded by The Earl of Macclesfield	Lord Lieutenant of Gloucestershire; 1694–1710	Succeeded by The 3rd Earl of Berkeley
Preceded by The 1st Earl of Berkeley	Custos Rotulorum of Surrey; 1699–1710	Succeeded by The Duke of Northumberland
Preceded by The Duke of Norfolk	Lord Lieutenant of Surrey; 1702–1710	Succeeded by The Duke of Northumberland
Peerage of England
Preceded by George Berkeley	Earl of Berkeley; 1698–1710	Succeeded by James Berkeley
Preceded by George Berkeley	Baron Berkeley (writ in acceleration) (descended by acceleration); 1689–1705	Succeeded by James Berkeley
