= James Cholmondeley =

British Army officer and politician (1708–1775)

General The Honourable James Cholmondeley
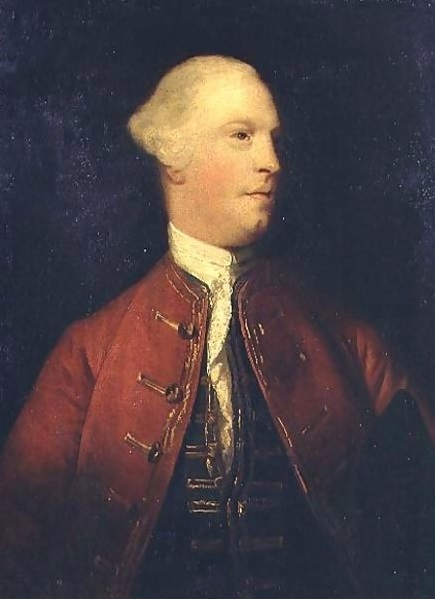
- Portrait by Sir Joshua Reynolds, c. 1759–1761
- Born: 18 April 1708; Cholmondeley Hall, Cheshire
- Died: 13 October 1775 (aged 67); Carrington House, Mayfair, London
- Burial place: Westminster Abbey
- Relatives: George, 2nd Earl of Cholmondeley, 1666-1733 (father); George, 3rd Earl of Cholmondeley, 1703-1770 (brother); George, later Marquess Cholmondeley, 1749-1827 (nephew)
- Military career
- Allegiance: Great Britain
- Branch: British Army
- Service years: 1725–1750
- Rank: General
- Units: Colonel; 48th Foot 1741–1743; 34th Foot 1743–1747; 12th Lancers 1749; 1st Carabiniers 1749–1750; 6th (Inniskilling) Dragoons 1750–1775
- Commands: Governor of Chester 1770–1775
- Conflicts: War of the Austrian Succession; Fontenoy; 1745 Rising; Falkirk
- Other work: Member of Parliament; Bossiney 1731–1734; Camelford 1734–1741; Montgomery 1741–1747

General James Cholmondeley (18 April 1708 – 13 October 1775) was an British Army officer and politician. He fought at Fontenoy and during the 1745 Rising commanded a brigade at the Battle of Falkirk, where he suffered severe exposure. He retired from politics in 1747 and ceased his active military service in 1750, although he was promoted to general in 1770. His marriage ended in divorce in 1737 and he had no children; he died in 1775 and was buried in Westminster Abbey.

== Life ==
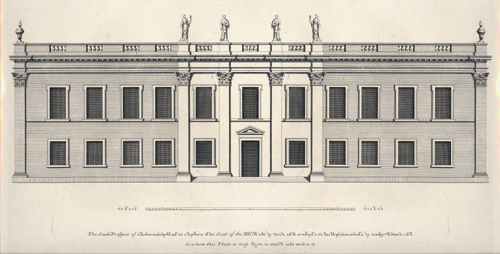
Cholmondeley Hall, where James grew up; demolished in 1804

James Cholmondeley was born in April 1708, third son of George, 2nd Earl of Cholmondeley (1666-1733) and Anna Elizabeth van Ruytenburgh (ca 1672–1722). His eldest brother, also named James, died young and George, Viscount Malpas (1703-1770) became heir; he had three sisters, Henrietta (1701-1769), Elizabeth (1705-1762) and Mary (1714-1783).

In 1726, he married Lady Penelope Barry (1708-1783), only child of the Earl of Barrymore and Elizabeth Savage. She was also heiress to Earl Rivers, who owned extensive estates near the Cholmondeley lands in Cheshire. The marriage was not successful and when they divorced in 1737, one of the conditions was neither would remarry; this meant that after Penelope died in 1783, the Rivers possessions passed into the Cholmondeley family.

He died childless in 1775 and his property was inherited by his nephew, George, later Marquess Cholmondeley.

== Career ==
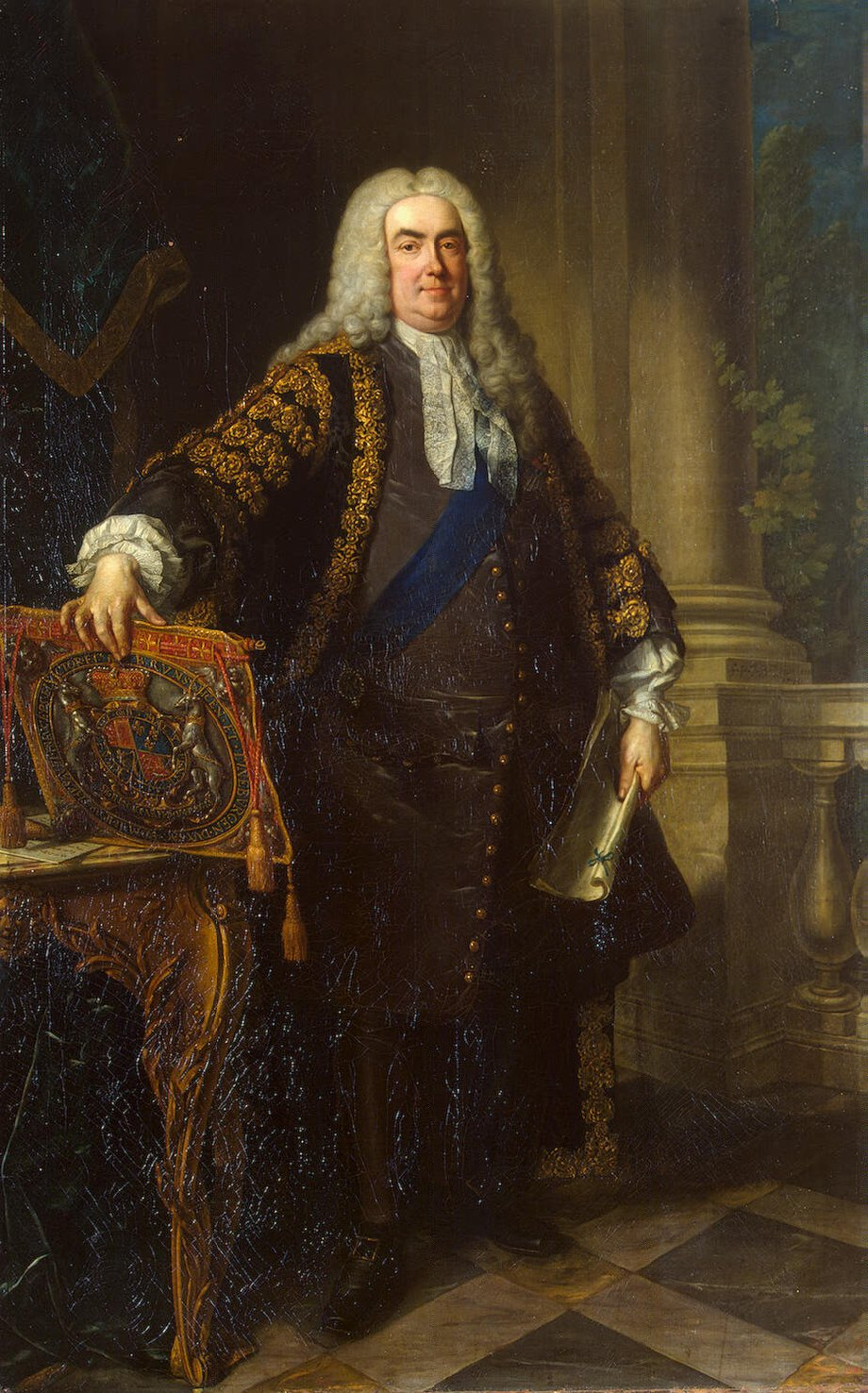
James was connected by marriage to Sir Robert Walpole, Whig Prime Minister 1721-1742

His father benefitted from backing William III in 1688 and George I in 1714, being rewarded with titles and offices, including command of the 3rd Troop of Horse Guards. In April 1725, James was commissioned into his father's troop, which was normally based in London, allowing its officers to combine a military career and political office.

His elder brother George married the daughter of Sir Robert Walpole, who was Whig Prime Minister from 1721 to 1742. He held a number of government positions, although his brother-in-law Horace Walpole (1717-1797) later described him as "a vain and empty man", promoted beyond his ability by his father-in-law.

This connection led to James becoming Member of Parliament for the government-controlled borough of Bossiney in 1731, then Camelford in the 1734 British general election. In 1739, commercial tensions with Spain resulted in the War of Jenkins' Ear; the military had been allowed to decay during the long period of peace since 1715 and early setbacks damaged Walpole's popularity.

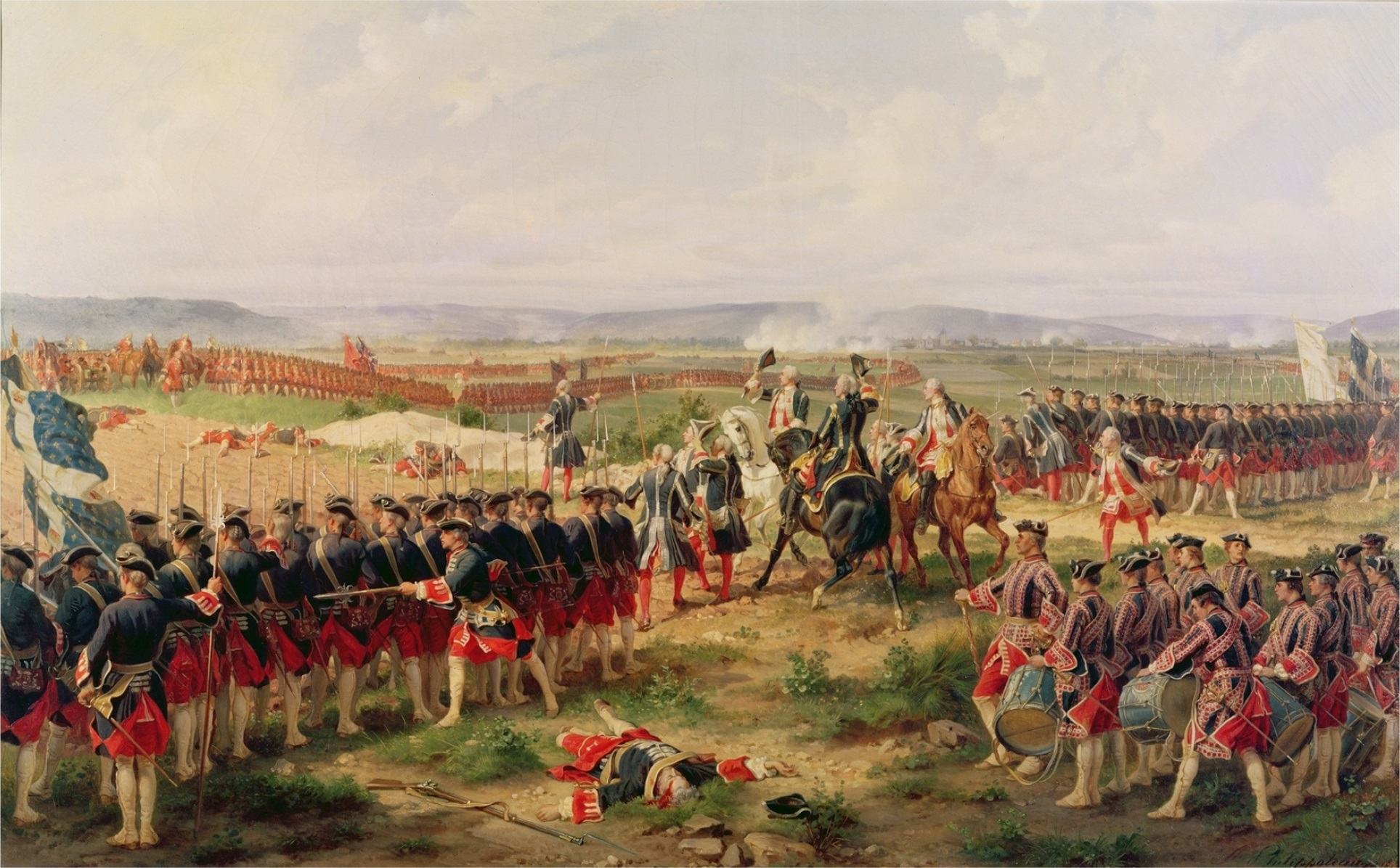
Fontenoy, May 1745; as part of the rearguard, Cholmondeley's unit helped the Allies retreat in good order

Cholmondeley was appointed colonel of the 48th Foot, a new regiment raised in January 1741 for the war. A few months later, he was returned as MP for Montgomery in the 1741 General Election but the government lost over 40 seats. While he continued to support the government, in February 1742 Walpole was removed from office and replaced by Earl Granville.

Britain now became involved in the War of the Austrian Succession and Cholmondeley transferred to the 34th Foot in December 1742. He campaigned in Flanders from 1743 to 1745, under the Duke of Cumberland and fought at Fontenoy in May 1745. While this was an Allied defeat, his unit was part of the rearguard action that enabled their forces to retreat in good order.

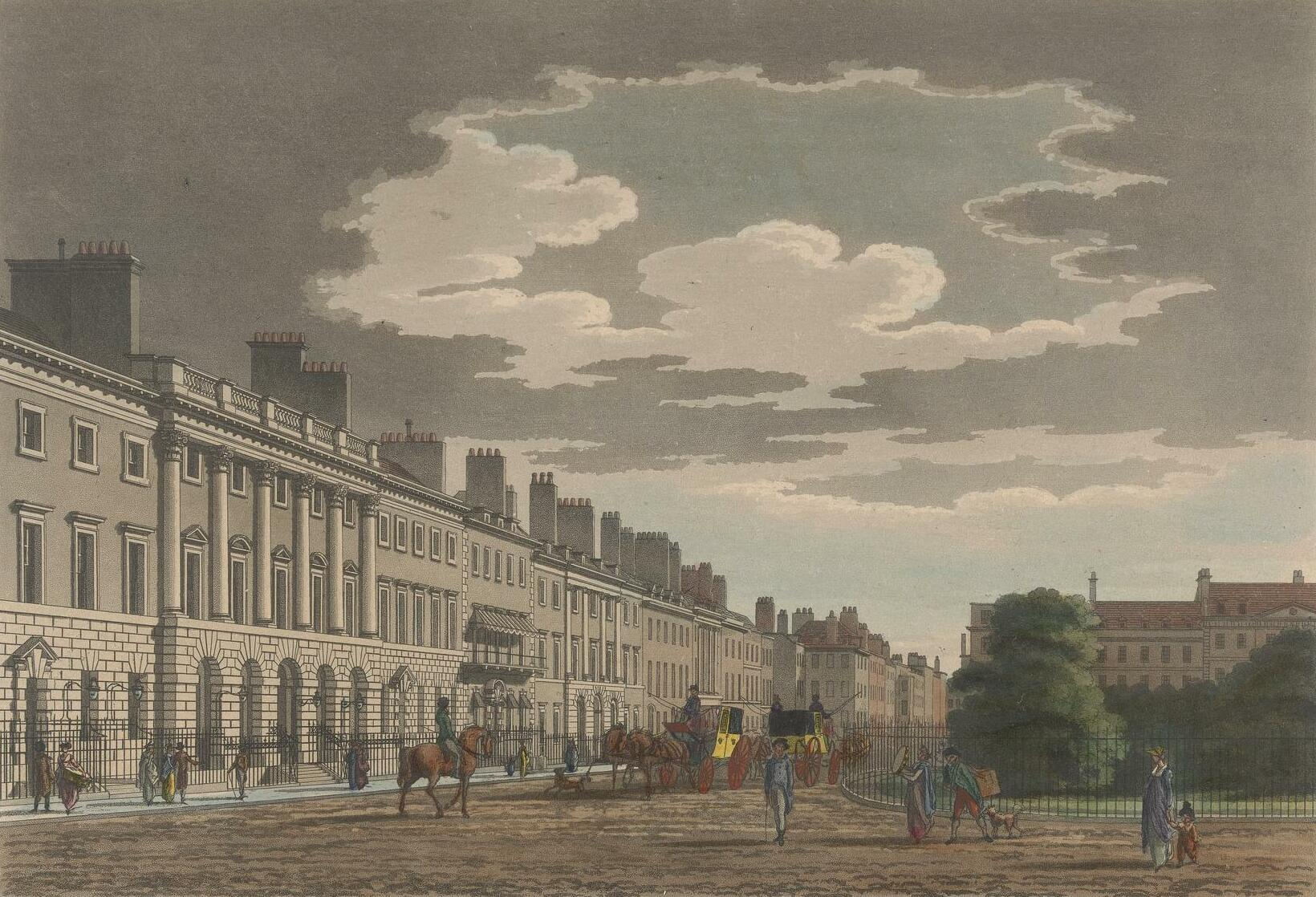
Grosvenor Square, Mayfair ca 1770; Cholmondeley lived nearby

Promoted Brigadier-General in July, his regiment was among the reinforcements sent to Britain in November during the 1745 Rising and served in Scotland under Henry Hawley. In early January 1746, the Jacobites besieged Stirling Castle; on 13th, Hawley ordered 4,000 men under Cholmondeley and John Huske north to Falkirk to relieve it, following himself with another 3,000 men. The Battle of Falkirk began late in the afternoon of 17 January in failing light and was marked by confusion and command failures on both sides. A violent snow storm broke out as the regiments deployed, making co-ordination extremely difficult; the government left was routed but Cholmondeley's brigade on the right held their ground and prevented a major Jacobite success.

He fell seriously ill as a result of the extreme weather conditions and was not present with his regiment at Culloden in April. This ended his active military career, although he remained Colonel of the 6th Dragoons until his death. He was promoted general in 1770 but in the 18th century, this simply meant the holder was eligible for command; there were far more generals than positions available and many never held an active post.

He retired from Parliament in 1747 and little is known of his life after this, although Dutch author Isabelle de Charrière records meeting him during her visit to London in 1766. When his brother George died in 1770, he replaced him as Governor of Chester but normally resided at Carrington House, in Mayfair. He died on 13 October 1775 and was buried in Westminster Abbey, near his uncles Robert and Richard, who died in 1678 and 1680 while pupils at Westminster School.

== Sources ==
- Avery, Emmett L, Scouten, A.H. (1968). "The Opposition to Sir Robert Walpole, 1737-1739". The English Historical Review. 83 (327).
- Colburn, Henry (1880). A Genealogical and Heraldic Dictionary of the Peerage and Baronetage of the British Empire. Vol. 42 pt. 1.
- Croston, James (1883). Historic sites of Lancashire and Cheshire. J. Heywood. p. 480.
- Edwards, HN (1925). "The Battle of Falkirk 1746". Journal of the Society for Army Historical Research. 4 (17).
- Henderson T.F, Spain, Jonathan (2004). Cholmondeley, George, second earl of Cholmondeley (Online ed.). Oxford DNB.
- Royle, Trevor (2016). Culloden; Scotland's Last Battle and the Forging of the British Empire. Little, Brown. ISBN 978-1408704011.
- Sedgwick, Romney (1970). "CHOLMONDELEY, Hon. James (1708-75)". History of Parliament Trust.
- Skrine, Francis (author), Grant, James (author) (2017). Fontenoy, Britain & The War of Austrian Succession, 1740-1748, With a Short Account of the Battle of Fontenoy. LEONAUR. ISBN 978-1782826453.
- Walpole, Horace (author), Wright, John (ed) (1842). Letter to Sir Horace Mann, January 1742 in The Letters of Horace Walpole': Volume I. Lea & Blanchard.
- Wood, Andrew B (2011). The Limits of Social Mobility: social origins and career patterns of British generals, 1688-1815. PHD LSE.

Parliament of Great Britain
Preceded by Robert Corker; John Hedges	MP for Bossiney; 1731–1734; With: John Hedges	Succeeded by The Viscount Palmerston; Townshend Andrews
Preceded by Thomas Hales; John Pitt	MP for Camelford; 1734–1741; With: Sir Thomas Lyttelton	Succeeded by The Earl of Inchiquin; Charles Montagu
Preceded by Sir William Corbet	MP for Montgomery; 1741–1747	Succeeded by Henry Herbert
Military offices
New regiment	Colonel, later 48th Foot; 1741–1742	Succeeded by Lord Henry Beauclerk
Preceded by James Cavendish	Colonel, later 34th Foot; 1742–1749	Succeeded by Hon. Henry Seymour Conway
Preceded by Sir John Mordaunt	Colonel, later 12th Lancers; 1749	Succeeded by Lord George Sackville
Preceded by Phineas Bowles	Colonel, 1st Carabiniers; 1749–1750	Succeeded by Lord George Sackville
Preceded by The Earl of Rothes	Colonel, 6th (Inniskilling) Dragoons; 1750–1775	Succeeded by Edward Harvey
Preceded by The Earl of Cholmondeley	Governor of Chester; 1770–1775	Succeeded by Charles Rainsford
