= Francis Wyndham (MP for Gloucester) =

British Whig politician

Francis Wyndham (c. 1670 – 1716), of Clearwell Court, Gloucestershire, was a British Whig politician who sat in the House of Commons briefly from 1709 to 1710.

Wyndham was the third son of John Wyndham of Dunraven, Glamorgan and his wife June Strode, daughter of William Strode of Barrington, Somerset. He matriculated at Wadham College, Oxford on 17 July 1686, aged 16 and was a scholar in 1687. He married Mercy Strode, daughter of Edward Strode MP, by 1696. She brought him £7,000, which he used to acquire Clearwell Court. He was elected a Member of the Society for Promoting Christian Knowledge, on the recommendation of Maynard Colchester in 1702. Under the aegis of the Society, he founded a school in his parish, distributed sermons, and supported the publication of a Welsh version of the Book of Common Prayer and 39 Articles. In 1703 he was elected Verderer of the Forest of Dean and he was High Sheriff of Gloucestershire for the year 1706 to 1707. He became a freeman of Gloucester in 1707. In 1708. he succeeded his brother to the family estates.

Wyndham was returned as Whig Member of Parliament for Gloucester with the support of the dean, Knightly Chetwood, at a by-election on 14 December 1709. He voted for the impeachment of Henry Sacheverell in 1710, in spite of Chetwode's request that he oppose it. He supported the proposal for a bill for the relief of insolvent debtors, and was added to its drafting committee on 20 February. Chetwode withdrew his support at the 1710 British general election and Wyndham was defeated. He did not stand again.

Wyndham died on 23 September 1716, aged 46, and was buried near Clearwell at Newland. His widow died in 1719. The estates passed to the family of his niece Jane, daughter of his elder brother William, after his only son died without issue in 1725.

Parliament of Great Britain
Preceded by Thomas Webb; William Cooke	Member of Parliament for Gloucester; 1709–1710; With: Thomas Webb	Succeeded by Thomas Webb; John Blanch
