= John Buckingham (chemist) =

English chemist (1943-2015)

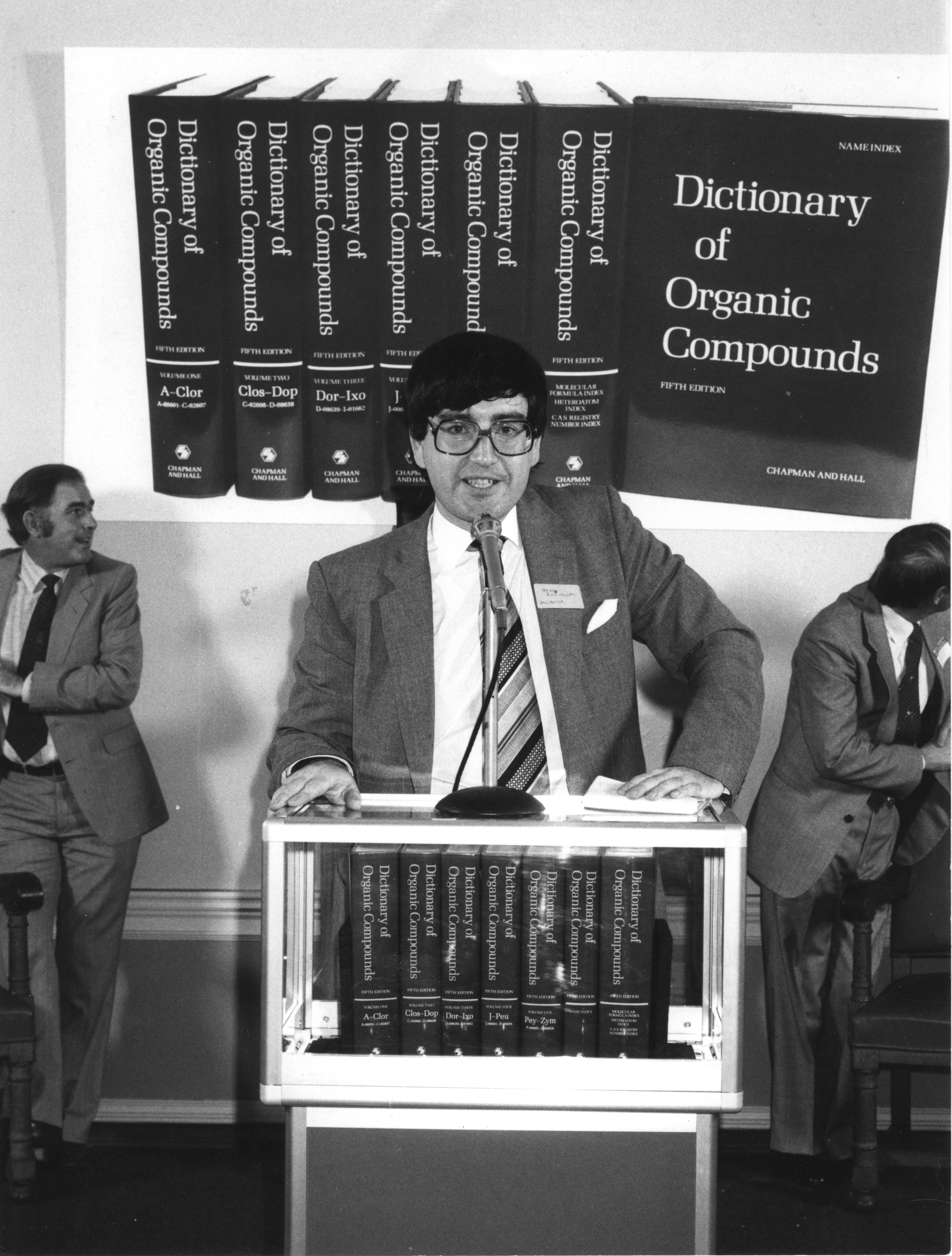
- Born: 21 March 1943; London, England
- Died: 28 August 2015 (aged 72); Carinthia, Austria
- Resting place: Kensal Green Cemetery
- Education: BSc University of Southampton; DPhil University of Sussex
- Scientific career
- Fields: Organic chemistry
- Workplaces: Westfield College, London University; University of Zurich; Chapman and Hall Publishing
- Thesis: Arylazo-Steroids and Related Compounds (1967)
- Academic advisors: Professor William Klyne, Westfield College, University of London

John Buckingham (21 March 1943 – 28 August 2015) was a British chemist known for his authorship of several chemical dictionaries including the Dictionary of Natural Products.

== Education and career ==
John Buckingham won a scholarship to Haberdashers’ Aske's Boys' School at the age of 11. It was there that he discovered chemistry and chose to apply to the University of Southampton where he won a First Class Honours degree. He gained his D.Phil. from the University of Sussex.

He became a lecturer in Chemistry in William Klyne’s department at Westfield College, University of London. Professor Klyne was writing a book on organic stereochemistry for Chapman & Hall and John’s expertise and attention to detail made him the ideal co-author. So the Atlas of Stereochemistry was published in 1974 to great reviews, with two subsequent volumes following a few years later.

John’s skills were recognized by the managing director at Chapman & Hall, Richard Stileman, who then engaged him on a full-time basis to prepare a new edition of the Heilbron’s Dictionary of Organic Compounds (DOC). This was a multi-volume reference work which needed bringing into the modern world with significant amendments required for the fifth edition. John was pivotal in converting the DOC into a database, and this now forms the basis of the modern DOC and its related dictionaries.

Once the DOC was published, John’s attention turned towards the chemistry of natural products such as alkaloids including strychnine and morphine, taxol. John had the foresight to anticipate the tremendous growth in natural products research and its relevance to the modern drug industry. His expertise with deciphering chemical literature and organising natural products by structure, coupled with his unflagging energy and enthusiasm, culminated in the publication of the Dictionary of Natural Products. This heralded a new phase of publishing with electronic products very much at the forefront. The CD ROM version of the Dictionary was published in 1991, two years before the book was published. It continues to be updated twice a year and John continued working on it full-time until the end. As Fiona Macdonald, the current editor of the Dictionary commented in a eulogy at his memorial service: "No other publication has ever achieved the breadth and depth of the Dictionary of Natural Products and today it is widely regarded as the benchmark in natural product information. John was very proud of its success and it truly is his life’s work and his legacy."

Buckingham also wrote two books for the general reader which covered chemical subjects. These are Chasing the Molecule, about the development of Chemistry as a science and Bitter Nemesis, the story of strychnine's introduction to Europe, its adoption first as a medicine, and later as a poison. In Chapter 16, Bitter Nemesis, he opens with the First World War to lead into a retelling of "a plot, now widely forgotten, to assassinate Lloyd George and Arthur Henderson, Leader of the Labour Party and member of the War Cabinet". Before publication there were several history sources, newspaper and media reports pointing to the likelihood that the plot was a fabrication of the undercover agent who was kept out of the trial of Alice Wheeldon and her family, and that the trial was unsafe.

John Buckingham is buried in Kensal Green Cemetery in London, United Kingdom.

== Notable works ==
- Atlas of Stereochemistry: Absolute Configurations of Organic Molecules. (Springer 1974, ISBN 0412106302)
- Dictionary of Natural Products. (Chapman and Hall/CRC 1993, ISBN 9780412466205)
- Dictionary of Organic Compounds, Sixth Edition. (Chapman and Hall/CRC 1995, ISBN 9780849300073)
- Chasing the Molecule. (The History Press 2004, ISBN 0750933453)
- Bitter Nemesis: The Intimate History of Strychnine. (CRC Press 2007, ISBN 9781420053159)
- Dictionary of Alkaloids, Second Edition. (CRC Press 2010, ISBN 9781420077698)
