= Sir Thomas Musgrave, 7th Baronet =

British Army officer (1737–1812)

General Sir Thomas Musgrave Bt
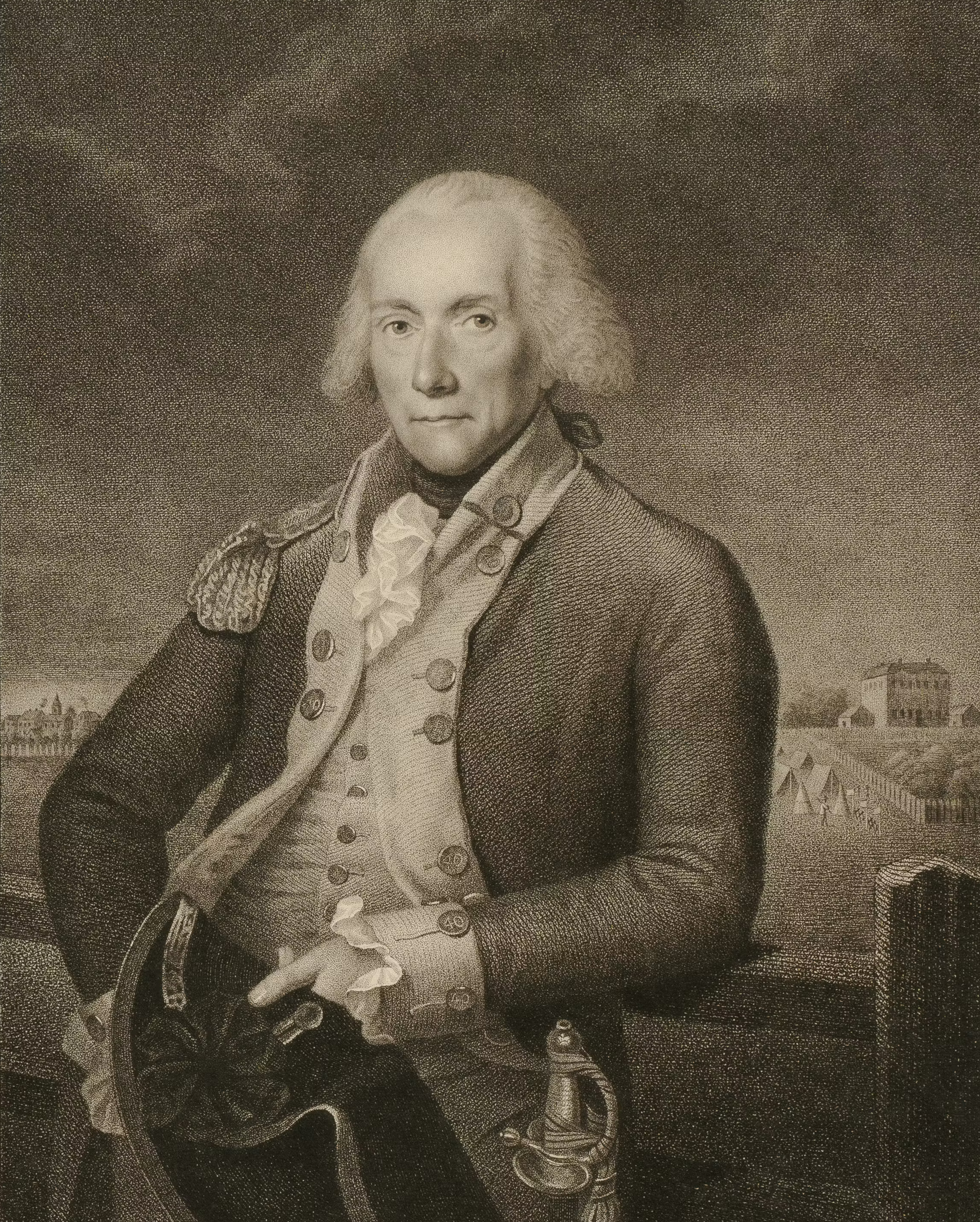
- Engraving by Georg Siegmund Facius after a 1786 Lemuel Francis Abbott portrait, 1797
- Born: 1737; England
- Died: 31 December 1812 (aged 75); London, England
- Military career
- Allegiance: Great Britain; United Kingdom
- Branch: British Army
- Service years: 1754–1812
- Rank: General
- Units: 3rd Regiment of Foot; 64th Regiment of Foot
- Commands: 40th Regiment of Foot; 76th Regiment of Foot
- Conflicts: American War of Independence; Battle of Long Island; Battle of Germantown

General Sir Thomas Musgrave, 7th Baronet (1737 – 31 December 1812) was a British Army officer who served in the American War of Independence. During the Philadelphia campaign he distinguished himself by commanding a detachment of the 40th Regiment of Foot at the Battle of Germantown.

== Early life ==
Thomas Musgrave was born in 1737, the sixth son and only surviving heir of Sir Richard Musgrave, 4th Baronet of Hayton Castle, Cumberland by his wife, the second daughter of John Hylton of Hylton Castle, Durham.

== Military career ==
=== Early promotions ===
He entered the British Army in 1754 as ensign in the 3rd Regiment of Foot and quickly rose through the ranks to fulfil a distinguished career. He was promoted to lieutenant on 21 June 1756 and captain in the 64th Regiment of Foot on 20 August 1759, before being further promoted to brevet major on 23 July 1772, substantive major on 17 August 1774 and lieutenant colonel in the 40th Regiment of Foot on 27 August 1776. The final promotion occurred as the result of the death of Lieutenant-colonel James Grant at Battle of Long Island.

=== American War of Independence ===
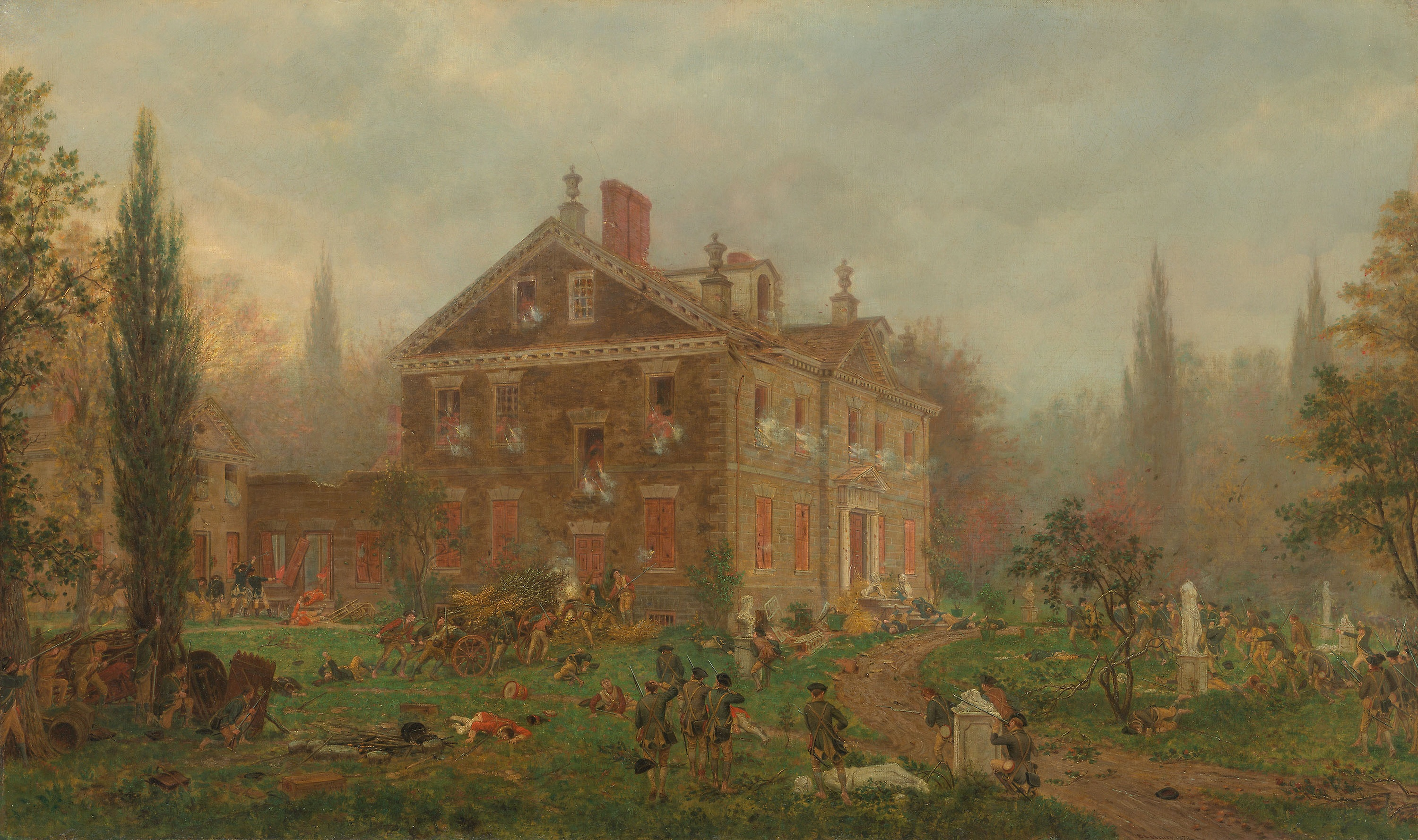
The Battle of Germantown, where Musgrave distinguished himself

Musgrave commanded the 40th Regiment of Foot in the Philadelphia campaign of the American War of Independence, where he greatly distinguished himself at Germantown, one of Earl Cornwallis's outposts in front of Philadelphia, when the American army in great force attacked the village on the morning of 4 October 1777. Musgrave, with six companies of his regiment, threw himself into a large stone house, later known as Chew House, which he defended with great resolution against repeated attacks, until he was reinforced and the Americans repulsed. The action was commemorated by a silver medal, which was at one time worn as a regimental order of merit. The house is represented on the medal, and is the background of one of the engraved portraits of Musgrave in the British Museum Prints.

=== Service in the West Indies ===
Musgrave went in 1778 to the West Indies as quartermaster-general of a force sent from New York under Major-general James Grant to capture Saint Lucia. He left the West Indies sick, but afterwards returned as a brigadier general to North America, and was the last British commandant of New York. Along with Brigadier-general Samuel Birch, Musgrave signed the certificates of freedom for former black slaves after the war.

=== Service in England and India ===
In 1781, he returned home as aide-de-camp to George III and deputy governor of Stirling Castle. Cornwallis mentioned him as at the reviews at Berlin in 1785 with Ralph Abercromby and David Dundas. On 12 October 1787 Musgrave raised the 76th Regiment of Foot as its colonel. The rendezvous was at Chatham, and the recruits were chiefly from the Musgrave family estates in the north of England. Musgrave went out to India with it, and served on the staff at Madras for several years. He became a major general on 28 April 1790. His hopes of a command against Tipu Sultan were disappointed by Lord Cornwallis, who appears to have thought that Musgrave did not work harmoniously with the civil government of Madras. Musgrave's plan of operations is published in 'Cornwallis's Correspondence. On his return Musgrave received many marks of attention from royalty. He was appointed governor of Chelsea Hospital, but exchanged with William Fawcett for that of governor of Gravesend and Tilbury, which did not require residence. He was promoted to lieutenant-general on 26 June 1797 and general on 29 April 1802.

== Death ==
He died in London on 31 Dec. 1812, aged 75, and was buried in the churchyard of St George's, Hanover Square, in which parish he had long resided. A portrait of Musgrave, painted by John White Abbott in 1786, was engraved and appeared in the 'British Military Panorama' in 1813. There is also a memorial to him at St. Kentigern's Church, Aspatria.

== The baronetcy expires ==
=== Sir James Musgrave, 8th baronet ===
James was succeeded by his eldest son, Sir James Musgrave, 9th baronet born in London on 24 May 1785. He was educated at Eton College and Christ Church, Oxford, where he was awarded a Bachelor of Arts in 1807. He was Sheriff of Gloucestershire in 1825–6. He died unmarried 6 December 1858.

=== Sir James Musgrave, 9th baronet ===
Sir Thomas was succeeded by his cousin Sir James Musgrave, 8th baronet of Barnsley Park, near Cirencester, Gloucestershire. He was the son of Reverend James Musgrave D.C.L. (Doctor of Civil [or Canon] Law), Rector (ecclesiastical) of Chinnor, Oxfordshire. James was born in 1752, he matriculated at St John's College, Oxford, where he received a Bachelor of Arts. in 1773 and a Master of Arts in 1777. He was Sheriff of Gloucestershire, 1802–03. He married Clarissa, daughter of Thomas Blackhall, of Great Haseley, Oxfordshire. He died on 27 April 1814.

=== Sir William Augustus Musgrave, 10th baronet ===
James was succeeded by his brother Sir William Musgrave, 10th baronet. He was born in 1792 at St Marylebone, educated at Westminster School, matriculated at Christ Church, Oxford where he received a Bachelor of Arts in 1813 and a Master of Arts two years later. He took Holy orders and became Rector (ecclesiastical) at Chinnor and eventually Emmington, Oxfordshire. He died unmarried on 30 September 1875, when the baronetcy became extinct.

== Bibliography ==
- T. Bulmer (1901). History and Directory of Cumberland. Preston: T. Bulmer & Co. Hesperus Press Ltd.
- George E. Cokayne (1900). Complete baronetage Vol. II. London.
- Irwin D Hastings (1910). War Medals and Decorations from 1588 TO 1889. London: L U Gill.
- Various (1992). The Concise Dictionary of National Biography Vol. II G-M. Oxford: Oxford University Press.
- J. Rose; M. Dunglinson (1987). Aspatria. Chichester: Phillimore.
- William Betham (2011) [1805]. The Baronetage of England: Or The History of the English Baronets, and Such Baronets of Scotland, as are of English Families; with Genealogical Tables, and Engravings of Their Coats of Arms, Volume 5 (reprint ed.). London: Burrell and Bransby (reprint by T. Bulmer & Co. Hesperus Press Ltd; Nabu Press).

Military offices
New post	Colonel of the 76th Regiment of Foot; 1787–1812	Succeeded by Sir George Prevost
Baronetage of Nova Scotia
Preceded by William Musgrave	Baronet (of Hayton Castle); 1800–1812	Succeeded by James Musgrave
