= Owen Buckingham (1674–1720) =

British Whig politician

- Born: 16 December 1674
- Died: 5 March 1720 (aged 45); Windsor, England
- Political party: Whig
- Spouses: 0
- Father: Sir Owen Buckingham

Owen Buckingham (16 December 1674 – 5 March 1720) of Moulsford, Berkshire, was a British Whig politician who sat in the House of Commons between 1708 and 1720. He died in a drunken fight with a friend.

Buckingham was the eldest surviving son of Sir Owen Buckingham of Moulsford and of St. Mildred's, Bread Street, London, former Lord Mayor of London and Elizabeth, the first of his six wives. He was admitted to the Russia Company in 1698. Later, he travelled abroad in Austria and Italy, and studied at Padua University in 1706.

Buckingham was returned as Whig Member of Parliament (MP) in a contest for Reading at the 1708 British general election in succession to his father. He acted as teller for the Whigs and supported the naturalization of the Palatines in 1709. He voted for the impeachment of Dr Sacheverell in 1710. |At the 1710 British general election he was returned unopposed for Reading. He again acted as a teller and was an active opponent of the ministry's trade policy, voting against the French commerce bill in 1713. He was defeated at the 1713 British general election, but became a Gentleman of the Privy Chamber in 1714.

Buckingham was returned for Reading at a by-election on 6 June 1716. He was appointed a Commissioner for victualling the Navy in 1717 and was returned without opposition at the ensuing by-election. He voted with the Administration on the repeal of the Occasional Conformity and Schism Acts and on the Peerage Bill in 1719.

On 5 March 1720 Buckingham went to a birthday celebration at Windsor given by a friend, William Aldworth. They both became intoxicated and hots words were exchanged, whereupon they went outside and had a fight in the dark. Buckingham received a fatal wound, but took the blame upon himself with his dying breath. He was unmarried.

Parliament of Great Britain
| Preceded by Sir Owen Buckingham; Sir William Rich, Bt | Member of Parliament for Reading; 1708–1713; With: Anthony Blagrave 1708–10; John Dalby 1710–13 | Succeeded by Felix Calvert; Robert Clarges |
| Preceded by Felix Calvert; Robert Clarges | Member of Parliament for Reading; 1716–1720; With: Charles Cadogan | Succeeded by Charles Cadogan; Richard Thompson |
