= Tanfield Vachell (1668–1705) =

English politician

Tanfield Vachell (c. 14 April 1668 – 19 October 1705) was an English Whig politician who served as MP for Reading from December 1701 until his death on 19 October 1705.

== Family and education ==
He was baptised on 14 April 1668. He was the first son of Thomas Vachell and Anne (nee Tayleur). Vachell's grandfather had been a Royalist. Vachell's father served as Sheriff of Berkshire in 1671 and stood at Reading in February 1679, coming third. His father died in 1683.

He married Dorothy, the daughter of Thomas Breton, a London merchant before 1685 and they had six sons (one predeceased him) and two daughters.

== Political career ==
From 1696 till 1697, he served as Sheriff of Berkshire. He unsuccessfully ran for Reading in January 1701 but captured the seat again in December 1701.
