= Josh =

Josh is a masculine given name. It is frequently a diminutive (hypocorism) of the given name Joshua and historically a diminutive of Josiah but has been used independently as a given name. The diminutive has been in use since the 19th century. It may refer to:

== People ==
=== A–J ===
- Big Josh, stage name for American professional wrestler Matt Osborne (1957–2013)
- Josh Adams (American football) (born 1996), American football player
- Josh Ali (born 1999), American football player
- Josh Allen (disambiguation), multiple people
- Josh Appelt (born 1983), American mixed martial artist
- Josh Bailey (born 1989), Canadian ice hockey player
- Josh Ball (born 1998), American football player
- Josh Barnett (born 1977), American mixed martial artist and professional wrestler
- Josh Beckett (born 1980), American former Major League Baseball pitcher
- Josh Bell (disambiguation), multiple people
- Josh Berry (born 1990), American racing driver
- Josh Bilicki (born 1995), American racing driver
- Josh Billings (1818–1885), American humorist
- Josh Binstock (born 1981), Canadian Olympic volleyball player
- Josh Blackwell (born 1999), American football player
- Josh Boyer (born 1977), American football coach
- Josh Brolin (born 1968), American actor
- Josh Brown (disambiguation), multiple people
- Josh Butler (disambiguation), multiple people
- Josh Bynes (born 1989), American football player
- Josh Byrne (born 1996), Canadian lacrosse player
- Josh Carraway (born 1994), American football player
- Josh Charles (born 1971), American actor
- Josh Childress (born 1983), American basketball player
- Josh Conerly Jr. (born 2003), American football player
- Josh Cooper (cryptographer) (1901–1981), British cryptographer
- Josh Cooper (defensive end) (born 1980), American football player, formerly in the NFL
- Josh Cooper (wide receiver) (born 1989), American former NFL player
- Josh Cuevas (born 2003), American football player
- Josh Culbreath (1932–2021), American hurdler
- Josh DeBerry (born 2001), American football player
- Josh Donaldson (born 1985), American baseball player
- Josh Downs (born 2001), American football player
- Josh Duggar (born 1988), American reality TV participant and political activist
- Josh Duhamel (born 1972), American actor and former model
- Josh Dun (born 1988), American drummer and trumpeter, currently in the band Twenty One Pilots
- Josh Farro (born 1987), American musician
- Josh Freeman (born 1988), American football player
- Josh Fryar (born 2002), American football player
- Josh Gad (born 1981), American actor
- Josh Gesky (born 2002), American football player
- Josh Gibson (1911–1947), American Negro league baseball catcher
- Josh Goodwin (born 1983), American basketball player
- Josh Gordon (disambiguation), multiple people
- Josh Groban (born 1981), American singer, songwriter, actor and record producer
- Josh Guyer (born 1994), Australian professional baseball player
- Josh Hader (born 1994), American baseball player
- Josh Hall (disambiguation), multiple people
- Josh Hamilton (actor) (born 1969), American actor
- Josh Hamilton (born 1981), American Major League Baseball player
- Josh Hammond (born 1998), American football player
- Josh Harris (disambiguation), multiple people
- Josh Harrison (born 1987), American baseball player
- Josh Hart (born 1995), American basketball player
- Josh Hartnett (born 1978), American actor and movie producer
- Josh Harvey-Clemons (born 1994), American football player
- Josh Hawley (born 1979), American politician and current U.S. senator from Missouri
- Josh Hawley (basketball) (born 1996), American basketball player
- Josh Hayes (American football) (born 1999), American football player
- Josh Henderson (born 1981), American actor, model and singer
- Josh Hoffman (born 1988), Australian rugby league player
- Josh Holloway (born 1969), American actor
- Josh Homme (born 1973), American singer, songwriter, musician, record producer and actor
- Josh Hoover (American football) (born 2003), American football player
- Josh Hoover (politician), American politician
- Josh Hope (born 1998), Australian association football player
- Josh Howard (born 1980), American basketball player, formerly in the National Basketball Association (NBA)
- Josh Hubbard (born 2004), American basketball player
- Josh Huff (born 1991), American football player
- Josh Hutcherson (born 1992), American actor
- Josh Imatorbhebhe (born 1998), American football player
- Josh Jackson (basketball) (born 1997), American basketball player
- Josh Jackson (cornerback) (born 1996), American football player
- Josh Jackson (rugby league) (born 1991), Australian rugby league player
- Josh Jacobs (born 1998), American football player
- Josh Jasper (born 1987), All-American college football placekicker
- Josh Jobe (born 1998), American football player
- Josh Johnson (disambiguation), multiple people

=== K–Z ===
- Josh Kaltenberger (born 2001), American football player
- Josh Katz (born 1997), Australian Olympic judoka
- Josh Kelly (disambiguation), multiple people
- Josh Kennet (born 1987), English-Israeli footballer
- Josh Kline (born 1989), American football player
- Josh Kline (artist) (born 1979), American artist
- Josh Klinghoffer (born 1979), American guitarist with the rock band Red Hot Chili Peppers
- Josh Kreutz (born 2003), American football player
- Josh Kronfeld (born 1971), New Zealand former rugby union flanker
- Josh Lafazan (born 1994), American politician
- Josh Law (born 1989), English footballer
- Josh Lindblom (born 1987), American professional baseball player
- Josh Love (born 1996), American football player
- Josh Lueke (born 1984), American baseball player
- Josh Mahoney (born 1977), former Australian rules footballer
- Josh Malihabadi (1894–1982), Pakistani poet
- Josh Malone (born 1996), American football player
- Josh Malsiyani (1883–1976), Indian poet
- Josh Mansour (born 1990), Australian rugby league player
- Josh Mayo (born 1987), American basketball player
- Josh McCown (born 1979), American football player
- Josh McCray (born 2002), American football player
- Josh McDaniels (born 1976), American football coach
- Josh McEachran (born 1993), English footballer
- Josh McGuire (born 1990), Australian rugby league player
- Josh McRoberts (born 1987), American basketball player
- Josh Metellus (born 1998), American football player
- Josh Meyers (disambiguation), multiple people
- Josh Miller (punter) (born 1970), American football player
- Josh Morris (disambiguation), multiple people
- Josh Mostel (born 1946), American actor
- Josh Nalley (born 1980/1981), American TikToker
- Josh Naylor (born 1997), Canadian baseball player
- Josh Nebo (born 1997), American basketball player in the Israeli Basketball Premier League
- Josh Newton (musician) (born 1973), American musician
- Josh Newton (American football) (born 2000), American football player
- Josh Norman (born 1987), American football player
- Josh Nurse (born 1996), American football player
- Josh Oliver (born 1997), American football player
- Josh Pais (born 1958), American actor and acting coach
- Josh Palmer (born 1999), Canadian-American football player
- Josh Pastner (born 1977), American college basketball coach
- Josh Pearson (born 1997), American football player
- Josh Peck (born 1986), American actor
- Josh Pederson (born 1997), American football player
- Josh Penner (born 1982), American politician
- Josh Perkins (born 1995), basketball player in the Israeli Basketball Premier League
- Josh Priebe (born 2001), American football player
- Josh Proctor (born 1999), American football player
- Josh Radnor (born 1974), American actor, director, producer and screenwriter
- Josh Ravin (born 1988), American professional baseball player
- Josh Reddick (born 1987), American baseball player
- Josh Reynolds (American football) (born 1995), American football player
- Josh Reynolds (born 1989), Australian rugby league player
- Josh Rosen (born 1997), American football quarterback for UCLA Bruins football
- Josh Ross (disambiguation), multiple people
- Josh Safdie (born 1984), American filmmaker
- Josh Samuels (born 1991), American water polo player
- Josh Satin (born 1984), American former Major League Baseball player
- Josh Scherer (born 1992), American chef and internet personality
- Josh Server (born 1979), American actor and comedian
- Josh Shipp (basketball) (born 1986), American basketball player
- Josh Sills (born 1998), American football player
- Josh Simmons (born 2002), American football player
- Josh Simons (born 1993), British politician
- Josh Simons (media executive), Australian musician and media executive
- Josh Sitton (born 1986), American football player
- Josh Smith (disambiguation), multiple people
- Josh Starling (born 1990), Australian rugby league player
- Josh Stephan (born 2001), American baseball player
- Josh Sweat (born 1997), American football player
- Josh Taves (born 1972), American former NFL player
- Josh Thomas (disambiguation), multiple people
- Josh Thompson (disambiguation), multiple people
- Josh Tols (born 1989), Australian professional baseball player
- Josh Tomlin (born 1984), American baseball player
- Josh Tordjman (born 1985), Canadian hockey goaltender
- Josh Uche (born 1998), American football player
- Josh Wagenaar (born 1985), Canadian former footballer
- Josh Walker (American football) (born 1991), American NFL player
- Josh Walker (Australian footballer) (born 1992), Australian rules footballer
- Josh Walker (footballer, born 1989), English footballer
- Josh Watson (American football) (born 1996), American football player
- Josh West (disambiguation)
- Josh Weston, an actor from the United States
- Josh Whitesell (born 1982), American former Major League Baseball and Nippon Professional Baseball player
- Josh Whyle (born 1999), American football player
- Josh Widdicombe (born 1983), English stand-up comedian and presenter
- Josh Wilcox (born 1974), American former NFL player
- Josh Williams (disambiguation), multiple people
- Josh Willingham (born 1979), American baseball player
- Josh Wilson (disambiguation), multiple people
- Josh Woodrum (born 1992), American football player
- Josh Woods (American football) (born 1996), American football player
- Josh Zeid (born 1987), American former professional baseball pitcher, formerly in Major League Baseball

== Fictional characters ==
- Josh (Arrowverse), in the American television series The Flash
- Josh Bauer (24), a character in season 6 of the American television series 24
- Josh Chan, in the American television series Crazy Ex-Girlfriend
- Josh Goodwin (EastEnders), in the British soap opera EastEnders
- Josh Lyman, in the American television series The West Wing

== See also ==
- Jawsh 685, New Zealand music producer
