= Joshua (name) =

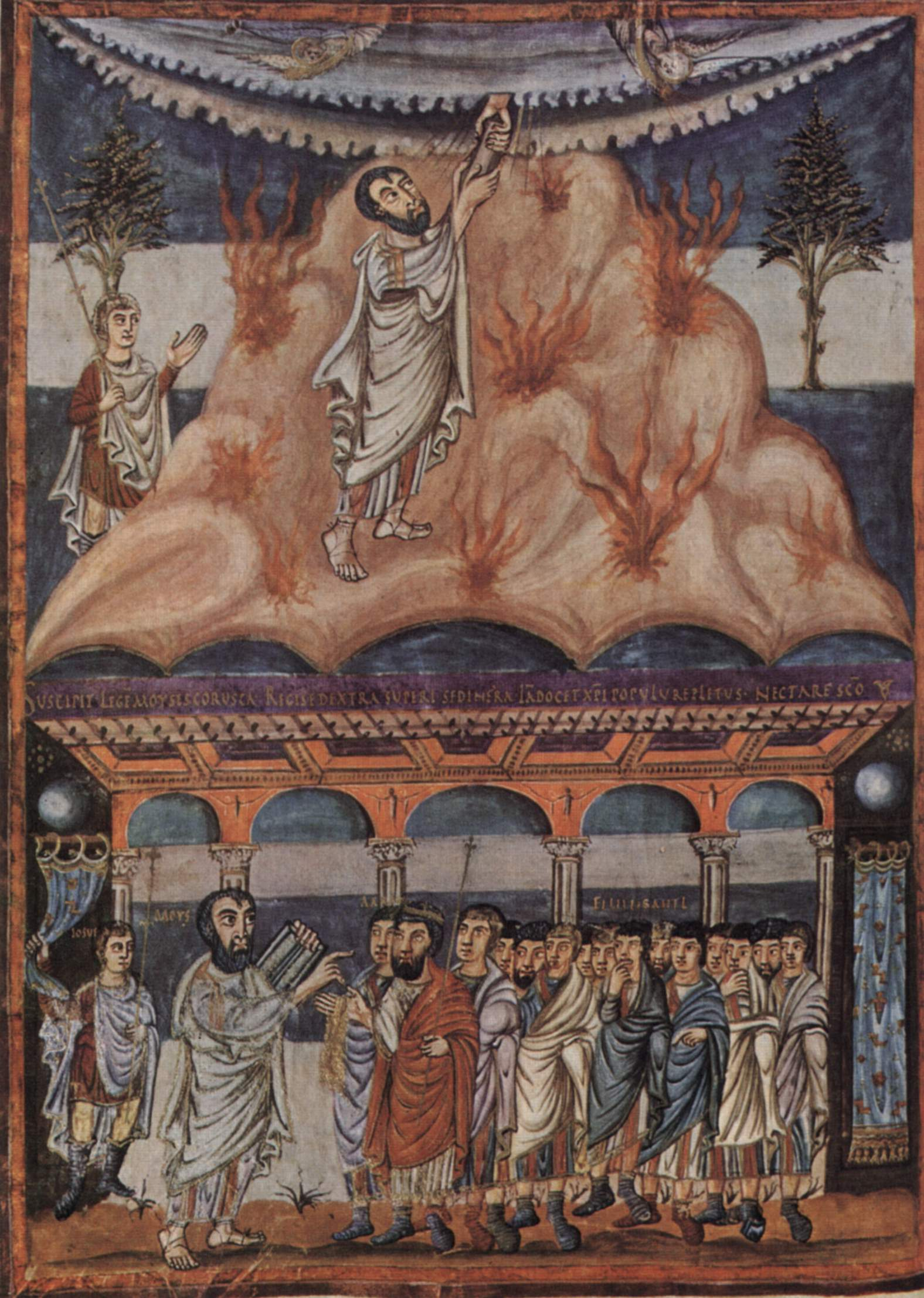
- Joshua and the Israelite people by Karolingischer Buchmaler, c.840
- Pronunciation: /ˈdʒɒʃuə/
- Gender: Male

Origin
- Origin: Hebrew (יהושע Yehoshua)
- Meaning: "YHWH is salvation"
- Region of origin: Middle East

Other names
- Related names: Jesus, Josue, Josh, Jason, Yeshua, Joseph

Joshua is a given name derived from the Hebrew יְהוֹשֻׁעַ (Modern: Yəhōšūaʿ, Tiberian: Yŏhōšūaʿ), prominently belonging to the early Hebrew leader of the Exodus period Joshua, who has a major role in several books of the Bible. In later periods, a common alternative form of the name was Yeshua (יֵשׁוּעַ, Yēšūaʿ) which corresponds to the Greek spelling Ἰησοῦς (Iesous), from which, through the Latin Iesus, comes the English spelling Jesus. As a result of the origin of the name, a majority of people before the 17th century who have this name were Jewish. A variant, truncated form of the name, Josh, gained popularity in the United States in the 1920s.

== Popularity ==
Information from the United Kingdom's Office for National Statistics from 2003 to 2007 shows "Joshua" among the top-five given names for newborn males. In Scotland, the popularity of "Joshua" has been substantially lower than in the rest of the United Kingdom, appearing at rank 35 in 2000 and rising to rank 22 in 2006.

== Biblical figures ==
- Joshua, leader of the Israelites after the death of Moses
- Jesus, known in his own tongue as Yeshua, an Aramaic form of Yehoshua (Joshua)
- Joshua the High Priest, High Priest ca. 515–490 BC after the return of the Jews from the Babylonian Captivity
- Joshua, aka Jose or Jesus, was the son of Eliezer, who was the son of Jorim. Joshua's name is sometimes translated as Jesus. He is also the father of Er and an ancestor of Jesus Christ.

== Ancient world ==
Ordered chronologically

- Joshua ben Perachiah (given name יהושע = Yehoshua), Nasi (prince) of the Sanhedrin in the latter half of the 2nd century BC
- Joshua ben Hananiah (given name יהושע = Yehoshua) (died 131), a tanna (sage)
- Joshua ben Levi, Jewish amora (scholar) in the first half of the third century
- Joshua the Stylite, author of a chronicle of the war between the Later Roman Empire and the Persians between 502 and 506

== Medieval period ==
- Joshua Lorki (fl. c. 1400), Spanish-Jewish physician

== Modern era ==
=== Pre-20th century ===
- Joshua Allen, 5th Viscount Allen (1728–1816), Irish nobleman
- Joshua Barnes (1654–1712), English scholar
- Joshua Bates (financier) (1788–1864), American international financier
- Joshua Boaz ben Simon Baruch (died 1557), Talmudist in Spain and later Italy
- Joshua Boyle, Irish Member of Parliament in 1641 and 1661
- Joshua Harrison Bruce (1833–1891), American farmer and politician
- Joshua dei Cantori, Italian converted Jew who attacked the Talmud in 1559
- Joshua Caslari (fl. 1540–1558), French Jewish liturgical poet
- Joshua Chamberlain (1828–1914), American brevet major general and professor, awarded the Medal of Honor for his actions in the Battle of Gettysburg
- Joshua Clayton (1744–1798), American Continental Army officer, Governor of Delaware and U.S. Senator
- Joshua Cooper (died 1757) (c. 1696–1757), Irish landowner and Member of Parliament
- Joshua Cooper (1732–1800), Irish landowner and Member of Parliament
- Joshua Edward Cooper (c. 1761–1837), Irish landowner and Member of Parliament
- Joshua Gwillen Doan (1811–1839), farmer and tanner who participated in the Upper Canada Rebellion of 1837
- Joshua Evans (Quaker minister) (1731–1798), American Quaker minister, journalist, and abolitionist
- Joshua Evans Jr. (1777–1849), American politician and member of the U.S. House of Representatives from Pennsylvania
- Joshua Falk (1555–1614), Polish Halakhist and Talmudist
- Joshua Fisher (merchant) (1707–1783), American nautical mapmaker
- Joshua Beal Ferris (1804–1886), American politician and US House Representative
- Joshua Fry (1699–1754), early American mapmaker
- Joshua Gilpin (1765–1841), American paper manufacturer
- Joshua B. Howell, (1806–1864) American (Union) Civil War officer
- Joshua Hughes (1807–1889), Welsh Anglican bishop
- Joshua Johnson (painter) (1763–1824), American painter
- Joshua Lewinsohn (1833–?), Lithuanian Jewish teacher and writer
- Joshua A. Lowell (1801–1874), American politician
- Joshua Leist (2005), British Graphic Designer
- Joshua Millner (1849–1931), Irish Olympic shooter
- Joshua Abraham Norton (1818–1880), "Emperor Norton", English-born American immigrant who proclaimed himself Emperor of the United States
- Joshua T. Owen (1822–1887), American (Union) Civil War brigadier general
- Joshua C. Pierce (1830–1904), American businessman and politician
- Joshua Reynolds (1723–1792), English painter, particularly of portraits
- Joshua W. Sill (1831–1862), American (Union) Civil War brigadier general
- Joshua Slocum (1844–1909), Canadian-American seaman, first man to sail solo around the world
- Joshua Zeitlin (1742–1822), rabbinical scholar and philanthropist born in the Polish-Lithuanian Commonwealth (now Belarus)
- Joshua Heschel Zoref (1633–1700), ascetic and an important figure in the Lithuanian Sabbatean movement

=== 20th and 21st centuries ===
- Josh Allen (disambiguation), multiple people
- Joshua Ang (born 1989), Singaporean film actor
- Joshua (Italian singer) (born Joshua Bale, 1995), Italian singer and rapper.
- Josh Barnett (born 1977), American mixed martial artist and professional wrestler
- Joshua Bartholomew (born 1984), Canadian singer-songwriter, musician and producer
- Joshua Bassett (born 2000), American actor and singer
- Josh Beckett (born 1980), American former Major League Baseball pitcher
- Joshua Bell (born 1967), American violinist and conductor
- Joshua Bloch (born 1961), American software engineer and author
- Zerkaa (born Joshua Bradley, 1992), British YouTuber, part of the Sidemen
- Joshua Ilika Brenner (born 1976), Mexican swimmer
- Joshua Brillante (born 1993), Australian footballer
- Josh Brolin (born 1968), American actor
- Joshua Burnham (born 2004), American football player
- Joshua Cardwell (1910–1982), politician in Northern Ireland
- Joshua Cephus (born 2001), American football player
- Joshua Chelanga (born 1973), Kenyan long-distance runner
- Joshua Christie (born 2001), Jamaican chess player
- Joshua Clottey (born 1977), Ghanaian professional boxer and former IBF welterweight champion
- Joshua Clover (1962–2025), American writer, poet, and university professor
- Josh Conerly Jr. (born 2003), American football player
- Josh Cooper (cryptographer) (1901–1981), British cryptographer
- Josh Cooper (defensive end) (born 1980), American football player, formerly in the National Football League
- Josh Culbreath (1932–2021), American hurdler
- Josh Dallas (born 1978), American actor
- Joshua Dariye (born 1957), Nigerian politician
- Joshua Dela Cruz (born 1989), American actor and host in Blue's Clues & You!
- Joshua Dionisio (born 1994), Filipino actor
- Joshua Dobbs (born 1995), American football player
- Josh Donaldson (born 1985), American Major League Baseball player
- Joshua Donovan (born 1999), American football player
- Joshua Dufek (born 2004), Austrian-Swiss racing driver
- Josh Duggar (born 1988), American reality TV participant and political activist
- Josh Duhamel (born 1972), American actor and former model
- Josh Dun (born 1988), American drummer, member of the band Twenty One Pilots
- Joshua Dürksen (born 2003), Paraguayan racing driver
- Joshua Eagle (born 1973), Australian tennis coach and former player
- Joshua Ezeudu (born 1999), American football player
- Joshua Farmer, American football player
- Joshua Fishman (1926–2015), American linguist
- Joshua (footballer, born 2007), full name Caio Joshua Lana de Andrade, Brazilian footballer
- Joshua Fox (born 1994), Fijian basketball player
- Joshua Frazier (born 1995), American football player
- Josh Gad (born 1981), American actor, voice actor, comedian, and singer
- Joshua Garcia (born 1997), Filipino actor and model
- Josh Gibson (1911–1947), American Negro league baseball catcher
- Josh Gordon (born 1991), American football player, formerly in the National Football League
- Joshua Gray (born 2000), American football player
- Joshua Green (disambiguation), multiple people
- Josh Groban (born 1981), American singer, songwriter, actor and record producer
- Josh Guyer (born 1994), Australian professional baseball player
- Josh Hader (born 1994), American Major League Baseball player
- Josh Hamilton (born 1981), American former Major League Baseball player
- Joshua Harrison (born 1995), Australian racing cyclist
- Josh Hartnett (born 1978), American actor and movie producer
- Joshua Hedberg (born 2007), American diver
- Joshua Holsey (born 1994), American football player
- Josh Homme (born 1973), American singer, songwriter, musician, record producer and actor
- Joshua (American singer) (born Joshua Hong, 1995), American singer, member of K-pop group Seventeen
- Josh Howard (born 1980), American basketball player, formerly in the National Basketball Association
- Josh Hutcherson (born 1992), American actor
- Joshua Jackson (born 1978), Canadian-American actor
- Josh Jasper (born 1987), American football player
- Josh Jobe (born 1998), American football player
- Joshua Jones (disambiguation), multiple people
- Joshua Caleb Johnson, American actor
- Joshua Johnson (disambiguation), multiple people
- Joshua Josephs (born 2003), American football player
- Joshua Kaindoh (born 1998), American football player
- Joshua Kalu (born 1995), American football player
- Joshua Karnes (born 2004), American gymnast
- Joshua Karty (born 2002), American football player
- Joshua Kelley (born 1997), American football player
- Joshua Kennedy (born 1982), Australian former soccer player
- Joshua Kim, Welsh politician
- Joshua Kimmich (born 1995), German footballer
- Josh Kronfeld (born 1971), New Zealand former rugby union flanker
- Joshua Kuroda-Grauer (born 2003), American baseball player
- Joshua Leakey (born 1988), British soldier, recipient of the Victoria Cross
- Joshua Lett (born 2004), Grenadian footballer
- Joshua Liendo (born 2002), Canadian swimmer
- Joshua Livestro (born 1970), Dutch columnist and political writer
- Josh Mahoney (born 1977), Australian rules footballer
- Josh McDaniels (born 1976), American National Football League offensive coordinator and former head coach
- Joshua Meggers (born 1980), American politician
- Joshua Miles (disambiguation), multiple people
- Josh Morris (disambiguation), multiple people
- Josh Morrissey (born 1995), Canadian ice hockey defenceman
- Josh Mostel (born 1946), American actor
- Joshua Neustein (born 1940), Polish-born American visual artist
- Joshua Onujiogu (born 1998), American football player
- Joshua Owusu (born 1948), Ghanaian retired triple jumper and long jumper
- Joshua Palacios (born 1995), American professional baseball player
- Josh Peck (born 1986), American actor
- Josh Pence (born 1982), American actor
- Joshua Perper (1932–2021), Romanian-born American forensic pathologist and toxicologist
- Joshua Pryor (born 1999), American football player
- Joshua Radin (born 1974), American singer-songwriter
- Josh Radnor (born 1974), American actor, director, producer and screenwriter
- Joshua Rush (born 2001), American actor
- Josh Satin (born 1984), American former Major League Baseball player
- Joshua (record producer) (born Jon Schumann, 1971), Danish music producer.
- Josh Server (born 1979), American actor and comedian
- Joshua Da Silva (born 1998), Trinidadian cricketer
- Joshua Simon (disambiguation), multiple people
- Joshua Smith (disambiguation), multiple people
- Joshua Suherman (born 1992), Indonesian entertainer
- Joshua Caleb Sutter (born 1981), American neo-Nazi
- Joshua Tasche (born 1995), German bobsledder
- Josh Thomas (comedian) (born 1987), Australian comedian, actor and writer
- Josh Tordjman (born 1985), Canadian hockey goaltender
- Joshua Uche (born 1998), American football player
- Josh Vaughan (born 1986), American football player
- Joshua Vaughan (born 2006), English actor
- Josh Wagenaar (born 1985), Canadian former soccer player
- Joshua Ward-Hibbert (born 1994), British basketball player and former tennis player
- Joshua Wheeler (born 1975), American Delta Force Operator, first American service member killed in action while fighting ISIS
- Josh Whitesell (born 1982), American former Major League Baseball and Nippon Professional Baseball player
- Joshua Wong (born 1996), Hong Kong activist and politician
- Josh Widdicombe (born 1983), English stand-up comedian and presenter
- Josh Wilcox (born 1974), American former National Football League player
- Joshua Wilkerson (1992–2010), American murdered student
- Joshua Williams (musician) (born 1974), American drummer
- Joshua Youngblood (born 2001), American football player
- Josh Zeid (born 1987), American baseball pitcher, formerly in Major League Baseball

== Fictional characters ==
- Joshua, father to Jake in the Cartoon Network show Adventure Time
- Joshua Clay, a DC Comics character also known as Tempest
- Joshua Deets, a recurring character in the Lonesome Dove American novel series
- Joshua Foley, Marvel Comics character also known as Elixir
- Joshua Matthews, a character from the sitcom Boy Meets World

== See also ==
- Josh (disambiguation)
- Yehoshua (disambiguation)
- Jesus (name)
- Josuah Sylvester (1563–1618), English poet
