= Jesus (disambiguation) =

Jesus (c. 4 BC – AD 30 or 33) was a Jewish preacher and religious leader whom most Christians believe to be the incarnation of God and whom Muslims believe to have been a prophet.

Jesus may also refer to:

== People ==
=== Religious figures ===
- Elymas Bar-Jesus, a Jew in the Acts of the Apostles, chapter 13, who opposed the missionary Paul on Cyprus
- Jesus Barabbas (Matthew 27:16–17 margin), pardoned criminal
- Jesus Justus (Colossians 4:11), Christian in Rome mentioned by Paul

=== Other people with the name ===
- Jesus (name), as given name and surname, derived from the Latin name Iesus and the Greek Ἰησοῦς (Iesous).
- Jesús Alou (1942–2023), Dominican baseball player
- Jesús Alique (born 1962), Spanish politician
- Jesus ben Ananias (died c. 73), Jewish nationalist mentioned by Josephus
- Jesus Ben Sira (fl. 2nd century BCE), religious writer, author of the Book of Sirach
- Jesus Borja (born 1948), Northern Mariana Islander politician and lawyer
- Jesus Christ Allin or GG Allin (1956–1993), American punk rock musician
- Jesús González Díaz (born 1994), simply known as Jesús, Spanish footballer
- Jesús Malverde (1870–1909), Mexican bandit-saint
- Jesús Martínez Barrios (born 1985), Spanish bullfighter
- Jesús de Miguel (1996–2026), Spanish footballer
- Jesús Rodríguez (disambiguation)
- Jesús Vidaña, formerly missing Mexican fisherman
- Jesús Casas (born 1973), Spanish football coach and current manager of the Iraq national football team
- Jesús Navas (born 1985), Spanish footballer
- Gabriel Jesus (born 1997), Brazilian footballer
- Isabel Jesus (born 1970), Portuguese rower
- Jesús Medina (born 1997), Paraguayan footballer
- Jesús Menéndez Larrondo (1911–1948), Cuban labor leader and politician
- Jesús Montero (1989–2025), Venezuelan baseball player
- Jesús Sagredo (born 1994), Bolivian footballer
- Jesús Castillo (born 2001), Peruvian footballer
- Jesús Owono (born 2001), Equatoguinean footballer
- Jesús Mansogo (born 2001), Equatoguinean footballer

=== People with the nickname or stage name ===
- Jesús (born 1977), stagename of American wrestler Aaron Aguilera
- Chris "Jesus" Ferguson (born 1963), American poker player
- Zola Jesus, stagename of American female singer songwriter Nicole Hummel
- Joshua "Jesus" Kennedy, former Australian footballer
- Kaleth O. Wright, 18th chief master sergeant of the Air Force and popularly known as "Enlisted Jesus"
- Jesus (footballer, born 1956), nickname of Angolan footballer Osvaldo Fernando Saturnino de Oliveira

== Arts and entertainment ==
=== Film and television ===
- Jesus (1973 film), an Indian Malayalam film
- Jesus (1979 film), also called The Jesus Film
- Jesus (1999 film), an American made-for-television film
- Jesús (2016 film), an internationally co-produced film
- Jesus (South Park), a recurring character on the South Park television series
- Jesus (TV series), a 2018 Brazilian telenovela
- Paul "Jesus" Monroe, a character in The Walking Dead franchise

=== Music ===
- Jesus (Blu album), 2011
- "Jesus" (Blu song), 2011
- "Jesus" (Gackt song), 2008
- "Jesus" (Jeremy Faith song), 1971
- "Jesus" (Queen song), 1973 work from the first Queen album, Queen
- "Jesus", a song by Luna Sea from the 1993 album Eden
- "Jesus", a 1968 song by The Velvet Underground from the album The Velvet Underground
- "Jesus", a song by Brockhampton from Saturation II
- "Jesus", a song by Jakobínarína from The First Crusade
- "Jesus", a song by Spiderbait from The Unfinished Spanish Galleon of Finley Lake
- "Jesus", a song by Cupcakke from Audacious
- "Jesus", a song by Kanye West from Cuck

=== Video games ===
- Jesus (video game)

== Geography ==
- Jesús (Ibiza), a village on the Island of Ibiza
- Jesús, a village in Tortosa, Spain
- Jesús, Paraguay, a town in Paraguay
- Jesús, Peru, a town in Peru
- Île Jésus, the main island of the city of Laval, north of Montreal
- Jesús District, a district in the canton of Atenas in the province of Alajuela
- Jesús (Metrovalencia), a metro station in Valencia, Spain

== Other uses ==
- Jesus College (disambiguation), multiple locations
- Jesus H. Christ, a common interjection
- Jesus in Islam, Islamic view of Jesus.

== See also ==
- Christ (title), the Greek title for Messiah, applied to Jesus for his role as the Jewish Messiah in Christianity
- de Jesus, surname
- Isa (name)
- Jesu (disambiguation)
- Yesu (disambiguation)
- Jesus Christ (disambiguation)
- Jesus of Nazareth (disambiguation)
- Joshua (disambiguation)
- Yeezus, 2013 album by Kanye West
- Yeshua (disambiguation)
- Yehoshua (disambiguation)
