= Jeshua =

Jeshua (יֵשׁ֡וּעַ), a variant of Yehoshua, may refer to:

- Yeshua or Jeshua, a Hebrew name mentioned in several places in the Jewish Tanakh
- Joshua the High Priest at the time of Ezra

== People commonly known under the name Jeshua ==
- Jeshua Anderson (Athlete)
- Jeshua Oneal (Christian Music Artist)
- Jeshua Ioane Luafutu (Rapper)

== See also ==
- Jesus (disambiguation)
- Joshua (disambiguation)
