= Joshua (surname) =

Joshua is a surname. Notable people with the name include:

- Anthony Joshua (born 1989), British professional boxer
- Bob Joshua (1906–1970), Australian politician
- Dakota Joshua (born 1996), American ice hockey player
- Daryne Joshua (born 1992), South African filmmaker
- Ebenezer Joshua (1908–1991), Vincentian politician
- Hirondina Joshua (born 1987), Mozambican poet
- Ivy Joshua (1924–1992), Grenadian trade unionist and politician
- Jaycen Joshua, American mixing engineer
- Maurice Joshua, American record producer
- Neo Jessica Joshua (born 1987), better known as Nao, English singer-songwriter
- Prem Joshua (born 1958), German-Indian musician
- Rosemary Joshua (born 1964), Welsh operatic soprano
- T. B. Joshua (1963–2021), Nigerian charismatic pastor
- Von Joshua (born 1948), American baseball player

== See also ==
- Joshua (name), a given name, including a list of people with the name
- Joshua (disambiguation)
