= Josue =

Josue is a variant of the name Joshua.

== Given name ==
- Josué Dubois Berthelot de Beaucours (1662–1750), French military officer
- Josue Briceño (born 2004), Venezuelan baseball player
- Athanase Josué Coquerel (1820–1875), French Protestant theologian
- Josue Dupon (1864–1935), Belgian sculptor
- Josué Smith Solar (1867–1938), Chilean architect
- Josué Francisco Trocado (1882–1962), Portuguese composer
- Josué Jéhouda (1892–1966), Swiss Zionist writer and journalist
- Josué de Castro (1908–1973), Brazilian physician
- Josué Santos (1916–2007), Mexican basketball player
- Josué Bengtson (born 1944), Brazilian politician and pastor
- Josué Sánchez (born 1945), Peruvian painter
- Josue Marquez (1946–2018), Puerto Rican boxer
- Josué Modesto dos Passos Subrinho (born 1956), Brazilian economics professor
- Josué Teixeira (born 1960), Brazilian football manager
- Josué Blocus (born 1969), French heavyweight boxer
- Josué Camacho (born 1969), Puerto Rican boxer
- Josué & Trópico Suemba (born 1969), Mexican singer-songwriter
- Josué Guébo (born 1972), Ivorian academic
- Josué Valdés Huezo (born 1975), Mexican politician
- Josué Méndez (born 1976), Peruvian film director
- Josué Carrión (born 1978), Puerto Rican businessman
- Josué Matos (born 1978), Puerto Rican baseball player
- Josué (footballer, born 1979), Josué Anunciado de Oliveira, Brazilian football defensive midfielder
- Josué Mayard (born 1980), Haitian football defender
- Josué Castillejos (born 1981), Mexican football midfielder
- Josue Deprez (born 1981), Haitian judoka
- Josué Galdámez (born 1982), Salvadoran football midfielder
- Josué Cajuste (born 1984), Haitian Paralympics athlete
- Josue (footballer, born 1987), Josue Souza Santos, Brazilian football striker
- Josué Flores (born 1988), Salvadoran football midfielder
- Josué Ayala (born 1988), Argentine football goalkeeper
- Juan Josué Rodríguez (born 1988), Honduran football attacking midfielder
- Josué González (born 1988), Costa Rican cyclist
- Josue Paul (born 1988), American gridiron football wide receiver
- Josué Mitchell (born 1989), Costa Rican football forward
- Paulo Josué (born 1989), Brazilian football midfielder
- Josue Soto (born 1989), American soccer midfielder
- Josué Balamandji (born 1989), Central African Republic football striker
- Josué Pesqueira (born 1990), Portuguese football attacking midfielder
- Josué Martínez (born 1990), Costa Rican football forward
- Josué Quijano (born 1991), Nicaraguan football defender
- Josué Albert (born 1992), French Guianan football defender
- Josué Sá (born 1992), Portuguese football centre-back
- Josué Bustos (born 1992), Mexican football forward
- Josué Brachi (born 1992), Spanish weightlifter
- Josue Matías (born 1993), Dominican gridiron football guard
- Josué Dorrio (born 1994), Spanish football winger
- Josué Enríquez (born 1994), Guatemalan squash player
- Josué Soto (born 1995), American soccer defender
- Josué Domínguez (born 1996), Dominican swimmer
- Josué Lázaro (born 1996), Mexican football midfielder
- Josué Reyes (born 1997), Mexican football centre-back
- Josué Gaxiola (born 1997), Mexican beach volleyball player
- Josué Homawoo (born 1997), Togolese football defender
- Josué Colmán (born 1998), Paraguayan football attacking midfielder
- Josue Monge (born 1999), Costa Rican football midfielder
- Josué Villafranca (born 1999), Honduran football forward
- Josué (Angolan footballer) (born 2000), Eduardo João Bunga, Angolan football goalkeeper
- Josué Abarca (born 2000), Costa Rican winger
- Josué Duverger (born 2000), Haitian football goalkeeper
- Josué Casimir (born 2001), Guadeloupean football forward
- Josué Doké (born 2004), Togolese football forward
- Josue Cruz Jr. (fl. 2005–2007), American professor
- Josué (footballer, born 2005), Josué Souza dos Santos, Brazilian football defensive midfielder
- Josué Galindo (born 2006), Honduran football midfielder
- Josué Alex Mukendi (fl. 2011), Congolese politician
- Josué Augusto Durán (fl. 2019), Ecuadorian writer
- Josue Ortega (academic), British economic lecturer

== Surname ==
- Bulambo Lembelembe Josué (born 1960), Congolese Christian minister
- Steve Josue (born 1980), American gridiron football linebacker

== See also ==
- Joshua (disambiguation)
