= Yeshua (disambiguation) =

Yeshua is the Hebrew name ישוע, an ancient common variant of Yehoshua יהושע (equivalent to English Joshua). It may also refer to:

- Jesus, whose English name comes from the Hebrew "Yeshua" via the Greek "Iēsous"
- Yahshua, one proposed transliteration of the original Hebrew or Aramaic name of Jesus commonly used by individuals in the Sacred Name Movement
- Yehshuah, a constructed form of the Hebrew name of Jesus originally found in the works of Kircher and Grossschedel and other late Renaissance esoteric sources
- Yeshu, the name of an individual or individuals mentioned in rabbinic books, which historically has been assumed to be a reference to Jesus when used in the Talmud
- Yehoshua (disambiguation), the Hebrew name יהושע (equivalent to English Joshua)

Yeshua may also refer to:

- Yeshua ben Sira, ישוע בן סירא (equivalent to English Jesus Son of Sirach), alternate name of Ben Sira, the 2nd century BCE author of the Book of Sirach
- Ilan Yeshua (fl. 2000s), business manager
- Yeshu (TV series), Indian television series about Christ Child broadcast on &TV

== See also ==
- Yesu (disambiguation)
- Jesus (disambiguation)
- Joshua (disambiguation)
- Yesha, geographical acronym
