= Rogan josh (disambiguation) =

Rogan josh (also roghan josh, roghan ghosht, rogan gosht) is a Kashmiri curried lamb dish.

Rogan Josh or Rogan Gosh may also refer to:

- Rogan Josh (horse) (born 1992), an Australian racehorse
- Rogan Josh, a 2018 short fiction film, which won 'Best Short Film' at the 2018 Filmfare Awards
- Rogan Josh Curry, a fictional character from the 2011 British television sitcom White Van Man
- Rogan Gosh (comics), a British comic book story arc from 2000 A.D. comics republished in Dark Horse Comics
  - Rogan Gosh, a character from the comic book story arc Rogan Gosh
  - Rogan Gosh, a graphic novel collection of the story arc Rogan Gosh

== See also ==
- Josh Rogan, nom-de-plume of U.S. screenwriter Melissa Mathison (1950–2015)
- Rogan
- Ghosht
- Josh (disambiguation)
