= Joshua Jones =

Joshua Jones or Josh Jones may refer to:

== People ==
- Joshua A. Jones, American media executive
- Joshua "Rookie" Jones, American baseball player
- Joshua Jones, American musician and member of Beatles tribute band The Fab Four
- Josh Jones (comedian) (born 1992), English comedian
- Josh Jones (rugby) (born 1993), English rugby league player
- Josh Jones (safety) (born 1994), American football safety
- Josh Jones (offensive lineman) (born 1997), American football offensive lineman

== Other uses ==
- Joshua Jones (TV series), a 1991 Welsh stop-motion children's television series
