= Jesu =

Jesu may refer to:

- Jesus (c. 4 BC – c. AD 30/33), Jewish religious leader and central figure of Christianity
  - Jesu (name), vocative and poetic form of Jesus' name

== Music ==
- Jesu (band), a British experimental band formed by Justin Broadrick
  - Jesu (album), a 2004 album by the band Jesu
- "Jesu, Joy of Man's Desiring", final movement of Johann Sebastian Bach's Herz und Mund und Tat und Leben, BWV 147
- Jesu, der du meine Seele, BWV 78, cantata by Bach
- "Jesu, meine Freude", hymn by Johann Franck
- Jesu, nun sei gepreiset, BWV 41, cantata by Bach
- Jesu, meine Freude, BWV 227, motet by Bach

== See also ==
- Jesus (disambiguation)
- Yesu (disambiguation)
- Yehoshua (disambiguation)
