= Leist =

Leist is a surname of German origin. The name is derived from Middle High German occupational and descriptive terms, and is historically associated with regions in southern and central Germany. Over time, bearers of the surname emigrated to other parts of Europe, North America, South America and Australia.

== History ==
The surname Leist originated in German-speaking regions during the medieval period. It may derive from the Middle High German word leiste, referring to a strip, moulding, or craftsman's tool, suggesting an occupational origin connected to carpentry or construction. Records of the name appear in Bavaria, Baden-Württemberg and Hesse from the 16th century onwards.

During the 19th and early 20th centuries, several families bearing the surname Leist emigrated to the United States, Brazil and Australia, contributing to the modern international distribution of the name.

== Distribution ==
Today, the surname Leist is most commonly found in Germany, the United States, Brazil and Australia, with smaller populations in other European countries.

== Notable people ==
Notable people with the surname include:

- Arthur Leist (writer) (1852–1927), German writer and journalist
- Burkard Wilhelm Leist (1819–1906), German jurist and legal scholar
- Fred Leist (1873–1945), Australian painter and official war artist
- Julian Leist (born 1988), German professional footballer
- Josh Leist (born 2005), Graphic Designer
- M. C. Leist (1942–2022), American politician and former member of the Minnesota House of Representatives
- Reiner Leist (born 1964), German-born photographer based in the United States
- Matheus Leist (born 1998), Brazilian racing driver

== See also ==
- List of German surnames
- German diaspora
