= Jesus of Nazareth (disambiguation) =

Jesus of Nazareth (c. 4 BC – AD 30 or 33) was a Jewish preacher and religious leader who Christians believe to be the incarnation of God and Muslims believe to be a prophet.

Jesus of Nazareth may also refer to:

- Jesus of Nazareth (1956), British television serial of 1956
- Jesus of Nazareth (TV series), British-Italian television miniseries of 1977
- Jesus of Nazareth: From the Baptism in the Jordan to the Transfiguration, 2007 book by Pope Benedict XVI
- Jesus of Nazareth: Holy Week, 2011 book by Pope Benedict XVI
- Jesus of Nazareth: The Infancy Narratives, 2012 book by Pope Benedict XVI

== See also ==
- Jesus (disambiguation)
- Jesus Christ (disambiguation)
