= Germani (disambiguation) =

Germani may refer to

- Germanic peoples, a collection of northern European ethnic groups in Roman times
- Germani (Oretania), pre-Roman ancient people of the Iberian Peninsula
- Germani cisrhenani, a group of tribes that lived during classical times to the west of the Rhine river
- Vita Germani, a hagiographic text written by Constantius of Lyon in the 5th century AD
- Germani (surname)
