= Yesu =

Yesu may refer to:

- Yesu or Yeshu, alternate forms of the name Jesus
- Yeshu (TV series), Indian television series about the Christ Child broadcast on &TV
- Wat Preah Yesu, orphanage of Cambodia
- Yesu Hei (died 1171), father of Genghis Khan
- Yesü Möngke (died 1252), son of Chagatai Khan
- Yesü Nto'a, brother of Yesü Möngke

== See also ==
- Yehoshua (disambiguation)
- Yeshua (disambiguation)
- Jesus (disambiguation)
- Jesu (disambiguation)
