= Fátima Langa =

Mozambican writer

Fátima Langa (June 24, 1953 – June 24, 2017) was a Mozambican writer, primarily of stories for young readers, which drew on her childhood in southeastern Mozambique. She was the founder of the publishing house Editora Mulheres e Jovens Moçambicanos.

== Biography ==
Fátima José Correia Langa was born in 1953 in Bahanine, Manjacaze District, in what was then Portuguese Mozambique. She was the oldest of 10 children.

Until she was six years old, she only spoke Chopi. She learned to speak Portuguese in primary school, continuing her education in Xai-Xai and then in the Mozambican capital, Maputo.

Since she was a child, Langa had told stories in her native language around the fire, but it did not occur to her to publish them. But she was encouraged by the Mozambican writer Lília Momplé to begin writing them down.

She began to publish stories and poems in various newspapers and magazines, but she did not publish her first book, Uma Jibóia no Congelador ("A Boa Constrictor in the Freezer"), until 2004.

She went on to publish at least 10 children's books, which present educational stores anchored in daily life, usually using anthropomorphic animals to illustrate everyday situations. Her books were published in various local languages, including Chopi, Makhuwa, Chuwabu, and Makonde, as well as in Braille.

With the support of the Fundação Fernando Leite Couto, two of Langa's books, Ndinema vai à escola and O gato e o coelho, were turned into plays.

In 2010, at age 57, she enrolled at Eduardo Mondlane University, where she obtained a bachelor's degree in journalism.

She founded her own publishing house, Editora Mulheres e Jovens Moçambicanos (Mozambican Women and Youth Publishing, or EMUJOMO), in 2015. She was also a founding member of Muchefa, an association of women heads of household, which supports women and children in need as well as people with HIV/AIDS.

She died on June 24, 2017, after falling ill while preparing to celebrate her 64th birthday.

== Selected works ==
- 2004: Uma Jibóia no Congelador
- 2006: Vhembeleti e outros
- 2012: O menino e a raposa
- 2013: O coelho e a água
- 2014: O leão, a mulher e a criança
- 2015: O galo e o coelho
- 2015: A gazela, o carneiro e o coelho
- 2015: Ndinema e o final de ano
- 2016: Memórias de uma inclui
- 2016: Ndinema vai à escola
