= Yesha =

Hebrew acronym for "Judea, Samaria, Gaza"

Yesha (Hebrew: יש"ע) is a Hebrew acronym for "Judea, Samaria, Gaza" (יהודה שומרון עזה, "Yehuda Shomron 'Azza") – a geographical area, roughly corresponding to the West Bank and Gaza Strip combined. Yesha is one of a number of terms used to describe the areas of former Mandatory Palestine, occupied by Egypt and Jordan and later became a part of a military governorate.

The Israeli Military Governorate was established by Israel in the Israeli-occupied territories following the Six-Day War in June 1967, together with Sinai and Golan areas. In 1982, areas of Yesha were transferred from military occupation governance to Israeli Civil Administration under the Ministry of Defense, whereas East Jerusalem was unilaterally annexed to Israel; the same year Sinai was returned to Egypt, while Western Golan was unilaterally annexed via the Golan Law. In 1994 and 1995, much of Yesha was transferred to autonomous rule of the Palestinian Authority, under the Oslo Accords.

Other acronyms used by Israelis for the West Bank portion are Shai (ש"י Shomron VeYehuda – Samaria and Judea), and Ayosh (איו"ש Ezor Yehuda VeShomron – Judea and Samaria Area).

The Yesha Council is the umbrella organization of the various municipal councils (local, regional, and cities) which represent Jews in the area. The Judea and Samaria Area administrative division was established to govern Israeli communities within the boundaries of Yesha (in area C of the West Bank).

== Not to be confused with ==
Aside from being an acronym, "yesha" (יֵשַׁע) is also the Hebrew word for salvation. As such, it has been used as place name for a moshav in Israel, Yesha, and also features in the biblical name Yeshayahu (Isaiah). In addition, neither of these uses is to be confused with Yeshua or Yeshu.
