= Joshua Hall (disambiguation) =

Joshua Hall (1768–1862) was an American politician and the eighth governor of Maine.

Joshua Hall may also refer to:

- Joshua G. Hall (1828–1898), American politician and U.S. Representative from New Hampshire
- Joshua M. Hall, American politician and member of Connecticut House of Representatives

== See also ==
- Josh Hall (disambiguation)
