= Alexander Faulkner Shand =

English writer and barrister

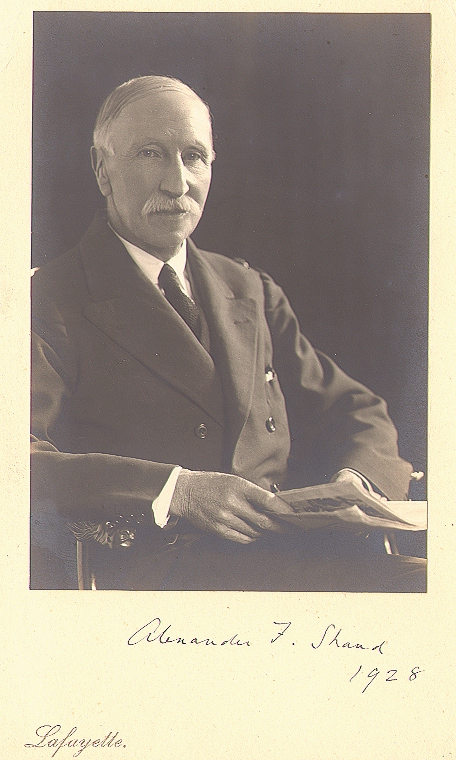
- Born: 20 May 1858
- Died: 6 January 1936 (aged 77)
- Occupations: Writer, barrister
- Notable work: The Foundations of Character: Being a Study of the Tendencies of the Emotions and Sentiments (1914)
- Spouse: Augusta Mary Coates
- Children: Philip Morton Shand
- Relatives: Camilla, Queen of the United Kingdom (great-granddaughter)

Alexander Faulkner Shand FBA (20 May 1858 – 6 January 1936) was an English writer and barrister. Through his son Philip, he is the patrilineal great-grandfather of Queen Camilla.

== Life ==
Alexander Faulkner Shand was born in Bayswater, London. he was the son of Hugh Morton Shand, a Scot (grandson of William Shand, 2nd Laird of Craigellie), and his wife Edrica Faulkner, the Italian-born daughter of Joshua Wilson Faulkner of Kent. Shand is said to have been briefly engaged to Irish author Constance Lloyd, who went on to marry Oscar Wilde. Shand later married Augusta Mary Coates.

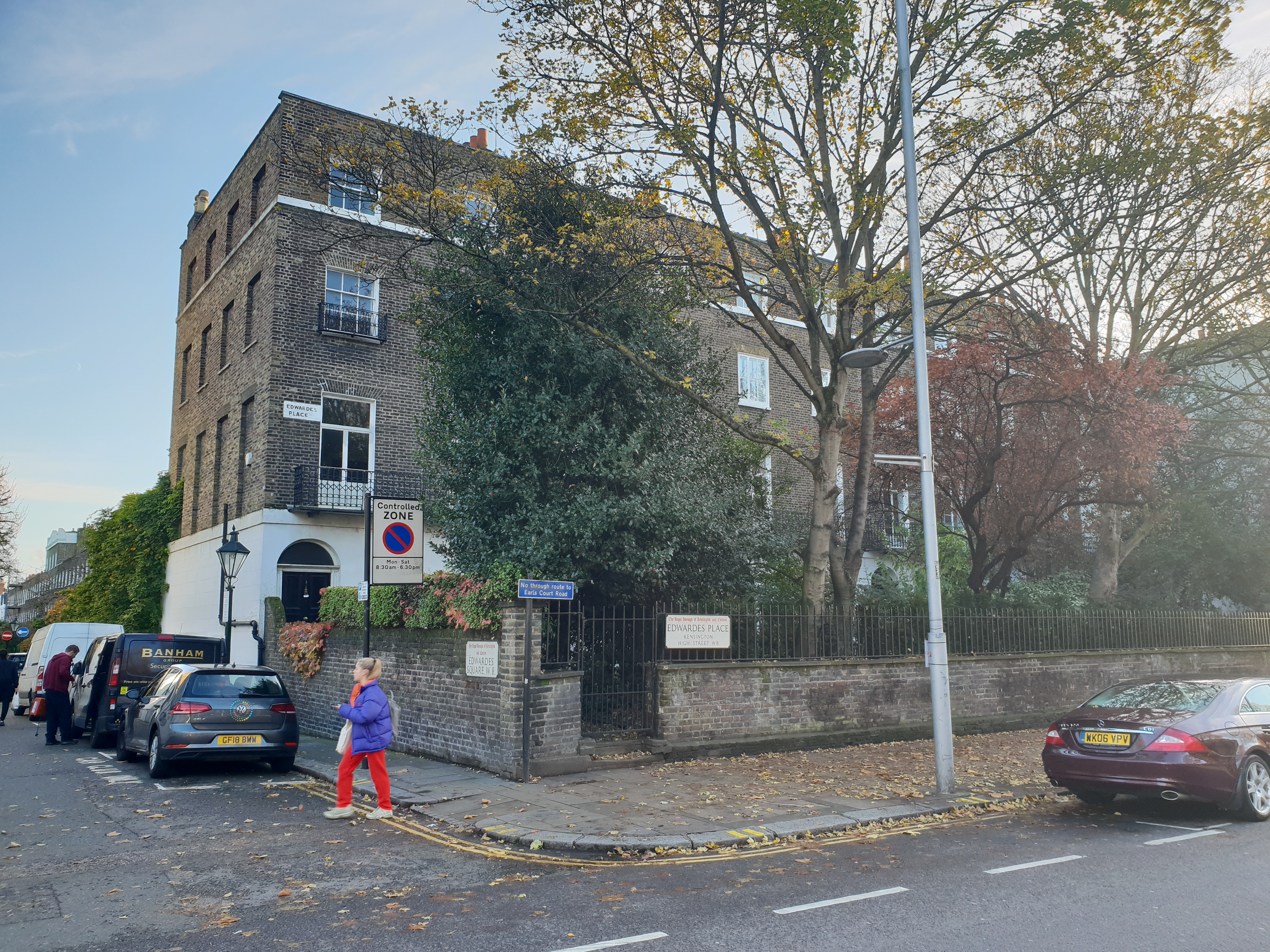
Edwardes Place in 2018, no.1 at left

Cambridge University conferred the B.A. in 1882 and the M.A. in 1896. He was a founding member of the British Psychological Society in 1901 and was awarded with honorary membership in 1934. He was elected a Fellow of the British Academy (FBA).

In Charles & Camilla, Gyles Brandreth describes Shand as:

a man who wanted to push boundaries, both intellectually and in terms of his personal conduct. His intellectual legacy is probably his work as a pioneer in the field of social psychology.

Of Shand's best known work, The Foundations of Character, Brandreth writes that its central theme was "the balance between instinct, sentiment and emotion on one hand and the pressures of society on the other." The Times described the book - first published in 1914 - as doing much "to create a science of character", and as "a valuable contribution to philosophical literature".

== Death ==
For most of his life, Shand lived at 1 Edwardes Place, Kensington, London. He died on 6 January 1936, aged 77.
