= Josh (disambiguation) =

Josh is a masculine given name.

Josh may also refer to:

== Arts, entertainment, and media ==
- Josh (2000 film), a Bollywood action film directed by Mansoor Khan
- Josh (2009 Kannada film), a 2009 Kannada film directed by Shivamani
- Josh (2009 Telugu film), a film directed by Vasu Varma
- Josh (2010 film), a Bengali film directed by Rabi Kinagi
- Josh (2013 film), a 2013 Pakistani film by Iram Parveen
- Josh (TV series), a British sitcom starring Josh Widdicombe
- "Josh" (The Outer Limits), a television episode

=== Fictional characters ===
- Josh Mankey, a recurring character in the animated series Kim Possible
- Dr. Josh Nichols, a character in the medical television series Brilliant Minds
- Joshua "Josh" Nichols, one of the title characters in the teen sitcom Drake & Josh

== Music ==
- Josh (musician), Filipino boy band member of SB19
- Josh (band), a Canadian Indian/Pakistani fusion band
- "Josh (song)", a 2021 song by Peach PRC

== Other uses ==
- Josh Cellars, an American winery
- "Josh", an early pen name of Samuel Clemens (1835–1910), better known as Mark Twain, American writer and lecturer
- Josh (novel), a 1971 young adult novel by Ivan Southall
- City of Josh, a location in the Book of Mormon
- Josh (app), Indian social media platform

== See also ==
- Josh fight, a 2021 meme event
- Joshua (disambiguation)
