= Jesus (name) =

Masculine given name

- Pronunciation: /ˈdʒiːzəs/
- Gender: Male

Origin
- Origin: Hebrew, Ancient Greek
- Meaning: "YHWH is salvation" or "Yahweh is Salvation,"
- Region of origin: West Asia, Greece

Other names
- Related names: Isa, Isho, Joshua, Yeshua, Jésus, Yashu, Jezús, Jézus.

Jesus (/ˈdʒiːzəs/) is a masculine given name derived from Iēsous (Ἰησοῦς; Iesus in Classical Latin), the Ancient Greek form of the Hebrew name Yeshuaʿ (ישוע), which is in turn etymologically related to another biblical name, Joshua.

The vocative form Jesu, from Latin Iesu, was commonly used in religious texts and prayers during the Middle Ages, particularly in England, but gradually declined in usage as the English language evolved.

Jesus is usually not used as a given name in the English-speaking world, while its counterparts have had longstanding popularity among people with other language backgrounds, such as the Spanish Jesús.

== Etymology ==
=== Linguistic analysis ===
There have been various proposals as to the literal etymological meaning of the name Yəhôšuaʿ (Joshua, Hebrew: יְהוֹשֻׁעַ), including YHWH (sometimes pronounced Yahweh or Yehowah) saves, (is) salvation, (is) a saving-cry, (is) a cry-for-saving, (is) a cry-for-help, (is) my help.

=== Yehoshua–Yeshua–Iēsous–IESVS–Iesu–Jesus ===
This early biblical Hebrew name יְהוֹשֻׁעַ (Yehoshuaʿ) underwent a shortening into later biblical יֵשׁוּעַ (Yeshuaʿ), as found in the Hebrew text of verses Ezra 2:2, 2:6, 2:36, 2:40, 3:2, 3:8, 3:9, 3:10, 3:18, 4:3, 8:33; Nehemiah 3:19, 7:7, 7:11, 7:39, 7:43, 8:7, 8:17, 9:4, 9:5, 11:26, 12:1, 12:7, 12:8, 12:10, 12:24, 12:26; 1 Chronicles 24:11; and 2 Chronicles 31:15 – as well as in Biblical Aramaic at verse Ezra 5:2. These Bible verses refer to ten individuals (in Nehemiah 8:17, the name refers to Joshua son of Nun).

This historical change may have been due to a phonological shift whereby guttural phonemes weakened, including [h]. Usually, the traditional theophoric element יהו (Yahu) was shortened at the beginning of a name to יו (Yo-), and at the end to יה (-yah). In the contraction of Yehoshuaʿ to Yeshuaʿ, the vowel is instead fronted (perhaps due to the influence of the y in the triliteral root y-š-ʿ). Yeshua was in common use by Jews during the Second Temple period and many Jewish religious figures bear the name, including Joshua in the Hebrew Bible and Jesus in the New Testament. This same weakening of gutturals also affected the guttural Ayin (ʿ / ˤ / ʕ), whose lenition widely led to its gradual loss in spoken language, furthermore affecting the pronunciation of the name.

During the post-biblical period the further shortened form Yeshu was adopted by Hebrew speaking Jews to refer to the Christian Jesus, however Yehoshuaʿ continued to be used for the other figures called Jesus. However, most Aramaic Dialects and Western Syriac Christian tradition use the Aramaic name ܝܫܘܥ (in Hebrew script: ישוע) Yeshūʿ and Yishōʿ, respectively, including the ʿayin.

The name Jesus is derived from the Hebrew name Yeshuaʿ, which is based on the Semitic root y-š-ʕ (Hebrew: ישע), meaning "to deliver; to rescue." Likely originating in proto-Semitic (yṯ'), it appears in several Semitic personal names outside of Hebrew, as in the Aramaic name Hadad Yith'i, meaning "Hadad is my salvation". Its oldest recorded use is in an Amorite personal name from 2048 B.C.

By the time the New Testament was written, the Septuagint had already transliterated ישוע (Yeshuaʿ) into Koine Greek as closely as possible in the 3rd-century BCE, the result being Ἰησοῦς (Iēsous). Since Greek had no equivalent to the Semitic letter ש shin [ʃ], it was replaced with a σ sigma [s], and a masculine singular ending [-s] was added in the nominative case, in order to allow the name to be inflected for case (nominative, accusative, etc.) in the grammar of the Greek language. The diphthongal [a] vowel of Masoretic Yehoshuaʿ or Yeshuaʿ would not have been present in Hebrew/Aramaic pronunciation during this period, and some scholars believe some dialects dropped the pharyngeal sound of the final letter ע ʿayin [ʕ], which in any case had no counterpart in ancient Greek. The Greek writings of Philo of Alexandria and Josephus frequently mention this name. In the Panarion of Epiphanius of Salamis, the name Iēsous comes from Hebrew/Aramaic and means "healer or physician, and saviour," and that the earliest Christians were named Jessaeans based on this name before they were called Christians. This etymology of "physician" may derive from the sect of the θεραπευταί (Therapeutae), of which Ephanius was familiar. More likely, however, the name Jesus (Greek Ἰησοῦς) was simply becoming associated by Greek speakers with the homophonic Greek word ἴασις “healing” and its cognates ἰᾶσθαι “to heal” and ἰατρός “healer.”

From Greek, Ἰησοῦς (Iēsous) moved into Latin at least by the time of the Vetus Latina. The morphological jump this time was not as large as previous changes between language families. Ἰησοῦς (Iēsous) was transliterated to Latin IESVS, where it stood for many centuries. The Latin name has an irregular declension, with a genitive, dative, ablative, and vocative of Jesu, accusative of Jesum, and nominative of Jesus. Minuscule (lower case) letters were developed around 800 and some time later the U was invented to distinguish the vowel sound from the consonantal sound and the J to distinguish the consonant from I. Similarly, Greek minuscules were invented about the same time, prior to that the name was written in capital letters (ΙΗϹΟΥϹ) or abbreviated as (ΙΗϹ) with a line over the top, see also Christogram.

Modern English Jesus derives from Early Middle English Iesu (attested from the 12th century). The name participated in the Great Vowel Shift in late Middle English (15th century). The letter J was first distinguished from 'I' by the Frenchman Pierre Ramus in the 16th century, but did not become common in Modern English until the 17th century, so that early 17th century works such as the first edition of the King James Version of the Bible (1611) continued to print the name with an I.

From the Latin, the English language takes the forms Jesus (from the nominative form), and Jesu (from the vocative and oblique forms). Jesus is the predominantly used form, while Jesu lingers in some more archaic religious texts.

=== Declension ===
In both Latin and Greek, the name is declined irregularly:

| | Latin | | Greek |
|---|---|---|---|
| nominative | Jēsūs | Iēsūs (Iēsus) | Ἰησοῦς |
| accusative | Jēsūm | Iēsūm (Iēsum) | Ἰησοῦν |
| dative | Jēsū | Iēsū | Ἰησοῦ |
| genitive | Jēsū | Iēsū | Ἰησοῦ |
| vocative | Jēsū | Iēsū | Ἰησοῦ |
| ablative | Jēsū | Iēsū | – |

== Biblical references ==
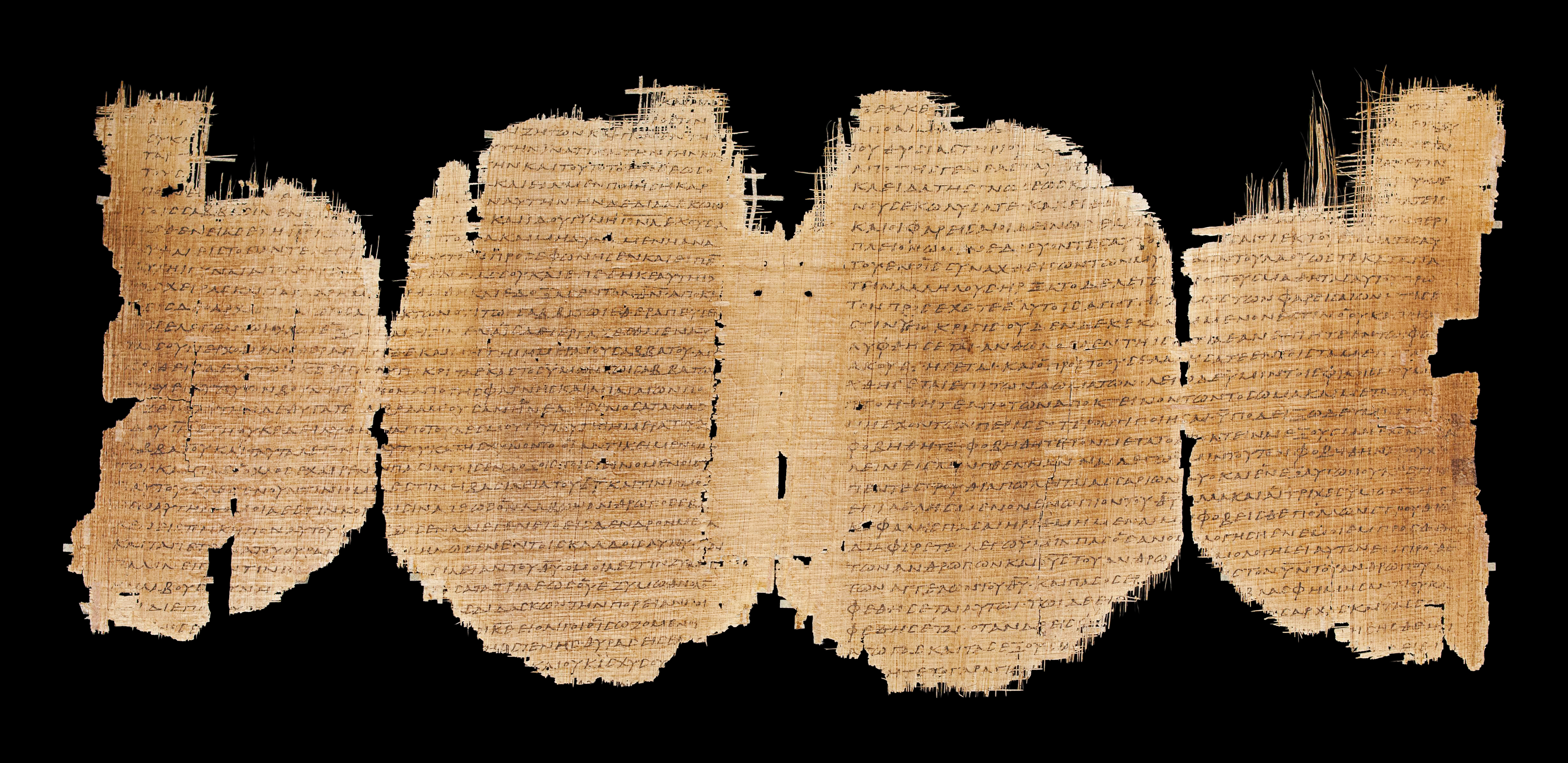
A 3rd century papyrus of the Gospel of Luke

The name Jesus (Yeshuaʿ) appears to have been in use in the Land of Israel at the time of the birth of Jesus. Moreover, Philo's reference in Mutatione Nominum item 121 to Joshua (Ἰησοῦς) meaning salvation (σωτηρία) of the Lord indicates that the etymology of Joshua was known outside Israel. Other figures named Jesus include Jesus Barabbas, Jesus ben Ananias and Jesus ben Sirach.

In the New Testament, in Luke 1:31 an angel tells Mary to name her child Jesus, and in Matthew 1:21 an angel tells Joseph to name the child Jesus during Joseph's first dream. Matthew 1:21 indicates the salvific implications of the name Jesus when the angel instructs Joseph: "you shall call his name Jesus, for he will save his people from their sins". It is the only place in the New Testament where "saves his people" appears with "sins". Matthew 1:21 provides the beginnings of the Christology of the name Jesus. At once it achieves the two goals of affirming Jesus as the savior and emphasizing that the name was not selected at random, but based on a heavenly command.

== Other usage ==
=== Medieval English and Jesus ===
John Wycliffe (1380s) used the spelling Ihesus and also used Ihesu ('J' was then a swash glyph variant of 'I', not considered to be a separate letter until the 1629 Cambridge 1st Revision King James Bible where "Jesus" first appeared) in oblique cases, and also in the accusative, and sometimes, apparently without motivation, even for the nominative. Tyndale in the 16th century has the occasional Iesu in oblique cases and in the vocative; The 1611 King James Version uses Iesus throughout, regardless of syntax. Jesu came to be used in English, especially in hymns.

Jesu (/ˈdʒiːzuː/ JEE-zoo; from Latin Iesu) is sometimes used as the vocative of Jesus in English. The oblique form, Iesu, came to be used in Middle English.

=== Other languages ===
Isho or Iisho, the Eastern Syriac Aramaic name of Jesus

In East Scandinavian, German and several other languages, the name Jesus is used. Some other language usage is as follows:

| Language | Name/variant |
|---|---|
| Afrikaans | Jesus |
| Albanian | Jezu |
| Arabic | عيسى (ʿĪsā) (Islamic or classical Arabic) يسوع (Yasūʿ) (Christian or latter Arabic) |
| Amharic | እየሱስ። (Iyesus) |
| Aragonese | Chesús |
| Aramaic | ܝܶܫܽܘܥ (Western Syriac and all other dialects: Yeshūʿ) ܝܼܫܘܿܥ or ܐܝܼܫܘܿܥ (Eastern Syriac: Īshōʿ/Ēshô) ࡏࡔࡅ (Mandaic: Eshu /ʿIshu |
| Arberesh | Isuthi |
| Armenian | Հիսուս (reformed orthography); Յիսուս (classical orthography) (Hisus) |
| Australian Kriol | Jisas |
| Azerbaijani | İsa |
| Belarusian | Ісус (Isus) (Orthodox); Езус (Yezus) (Catholic) |
| Bengali | যীশু (Yɪśu) (Christian) 'ঈসা (Īsā) (general) |
| Bosnian | Isus |
| Breton | Jezuz |
| Bulgarian | Исус (Isus) |
| Burmese | ယေရှု (Yay-shu) |
| Catalan | Jesús |
| Chinese | simplified Chinese: 耶稣; traditional Chinese: 耶穌; pinyin: Yēsū |
| Coptic | Ⲓⲏⲥⲟⲩⲥ (Isos) |
| Cornish | Yesu |
| Corsican | Ghjesù |
| Croatian | Isus |
| Czech | Ježíš |
| Dutch | Jezus |
| Estonian | Jeesus |
| Filipino | Jesús, Hesús or Hesukristo |
| Fijian | Jisu |
| Finnish | Jeesus |
| French | Jésus |
| Galician | Xesús |
| Garo | Jisu |
| Georgian | იესო (Ieso) |
| German | Jesus |
| Ewe | Yesu |
| Greek | Ἰησοῦς (Iēsoûs) / Ιησούς (Iisoús) (pronounced [i.iˈsus] in modern Greek) |
| Haitian Creole | Jezi |
| Lai-Hakha | Jesuh |
| Hausa | Yesu |
| Hawaiian | Iesū |
| Hebrew | יֵשׁוּעַ (Yeshuaʿ) |
| Hindi | यसू (Yesu) or यीशु (Yeshu) or ईसा (Īsā) |
| Hmong Daw | Yexus |
| Hungarian | Jézus |
| Icelandic | Jesús |
| Igbo | Jesus |
| Indonesian | Yesus (Christian); Isa (Islamic) |
| Irish | Íosa |
| Italian | Gesù |
| Japanese | イエス (Iesu) |
| Jinghpaw | Yesu |
| Kannada | ಯೇಸು (Yesu) |
| Kazakh | Иса (Isa) |
| Khasi | Jisu |
| Khmer | យេស៑ូ (Yesu), យេស៑ូវ (Yesuw) |
| Kikuyu | Jeso |
| Kisii | Yeso |
| Korean | 예수 (Yesu) |
| Kurdish | Îsa |
| Latvian | Jēzus |
| Ligurian | Gesû |
| Limburgish | Zjezus |
| Lithuanian | Jėzus |
| Lombard | Gesü |
| Luganda | Yezu |
| Māori | Ihu |
| Marathi | येशू (Yeshu Christa) |
| Malagasy | Jeso, Jesoa, Jesosy |
| Malay | Isa |
| Malayalam | ഈശോ (Īśo) Syriac-origin; യേശു (Yēśu) from Portuguese; |
| Mirandese | Jasus |
| Mizo | Isua (In Mizo names, an a has to be added behind every male name), Isu |
| Maltese | Ġesù |
| Mongolian | Есүс (Esüs) |
| Neapolitan | Giesù |
| Norman | Jésus |
| Occitan | Jèsus |
| Persian Farsi | عیسی (Īsā) |
| Piedmontese | Gesù |
| Polish | Jezus |
| Portuguese | Jesus |
| Romanian | Iisus (Orthodox); Isus (Catholic) |
| Russian | Иисус (Iisus) |
| Sardinian | Gesùs |
| Serbian | Isus / Исус |
| Sicilian | Gesù |
| Sinhala | යේසුස් වහන්සේ (Yēsus Vahansē) |
| Scottish Gaelic | Ìosa |
| Shona | Jesu |
| Slovak | Ježiš |
| Slovenian | Jezus |
| Somali | Ciise |
| Spanish | Jesús |
| Swahili | Yesu |
| Tajik | Исо (Iso) |
| Tamazight | ⵄⵉⵙⴰ, Ɛisa (ʿIsa) ⵢⴻⵙⵓ, Yessu |
| Tamil | இயேசு கிறிஸ்து (Yesu Christu) |
| Telugu | యేసు (Yesu) |
| Thai | พระเยซู (Phráʔ Yēsū) |
| Turkish | İsa |
| Turkmen | Isa |
| Ukrainian | Ісус (Isus) |
| Urdu | یسوع (Yesu) or یشوع (Yeshu) or عیسیٰ (Isa) |
| Uzbek | Iso |
| Venetian | Jesu |
| Vietnamese | Chúa Giêsu |
| Welsh | Iesu |
| Xhosa | uYesu |
| Yoruba | Jesu |
| Zomi (Tedim-Chin) | Zeisuh (most common), Jesuh |
| Zulu | uJesu |

== See also ==
- Holy Name of Jesus
- Joshua (disambiguation)

== Bibliography ==
- Aitken, James K.; Davies, Graham (2016). "יָשַׁע" [Yašaʿ] (PDF). Semantics of Ancient Hebrew Database.
- Ayali-Darshan, Noga (2018). "The Elements ש(ו)ע/שבע/תע in Biblical Proper Names: A Re-evaluation". Journal of Northwest Semitic Languages. 44 (1). Stellenbosch University. hdl:10520/EJC-ff5bd8a45 – via academia.edu.
- Robinson, Neal (2005). "Jesus". In McAuliffe, Jane Dammen (ed.). Encyclopaedia of the Qurʾān. Brill. doi:10.1163/1875-3922_q3_EQCOM_00099.
- Stegemann, Ekkehard (Basle) (2006). "Jesus". In Cancik, Hubert; Schneider, Helmuth (eds.). Brill’s New Pauly. doi:10.1163/1574-9347_bnp_e522560.
- Schochenmaier, Eugen (28 September 2022). "How did Jesus get his English name". Mondonomo. ISSN 2833-6496. Archived from the original on 28 September 2022.
