= Jesus Christ (disambiguation) =

Jesus Christ (c. 4 BC – AD 30 or 33) was a Jewish preacher and religious leader who most Christians believe to be the incarnation of God and Muslims believe to have been a prophet.

Jesus Christ may also refer to:

- "Jesus Christ" (Longpigs song), 1996
- "Jesus Christ" (Woody Guthrie song), 1940
- "J Christ", controversial 2024 song by Lil Nas X
- Jesus H. Christ, a common interjection
- Jesus the Christ (book), 1915 doctrinal study by James E. Talmage

== See also ==
- Jesus Christ Allin or GG Allin (1956–1993), American punk rock musician
- Christ (title), the Greek title for Messiah, applied to Jesus for his role as the Jewish Messiah in Christianity
- Jesus (disambiguation)
- Abrahamic religions
