= Edwardes Place =

Grade II listed houses in Kensington, London

Coordinates: 51.4952°N 0.2047°W

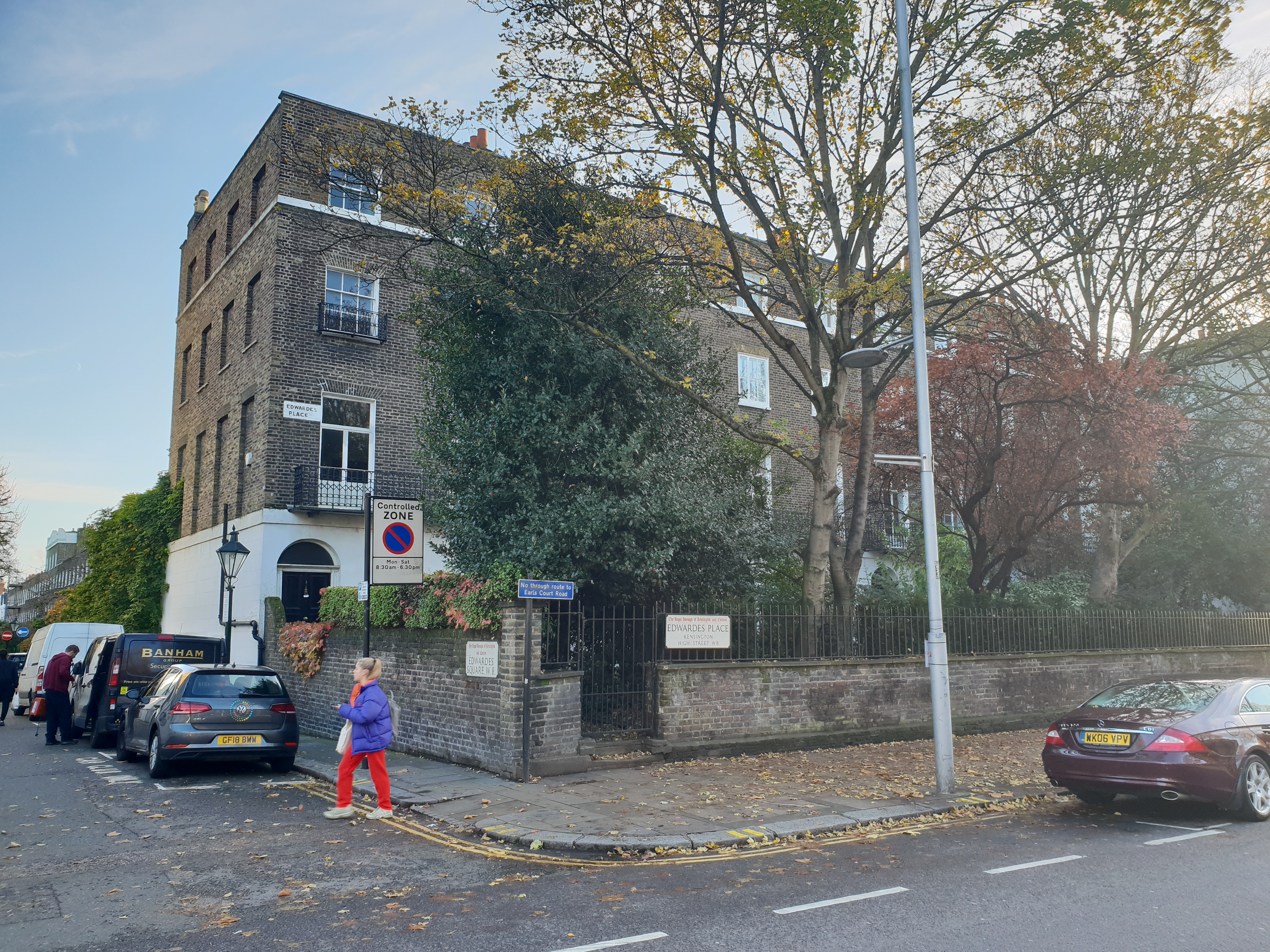
Edwardes Place in 2018

1-5 Edwardes Place is a grade II listed terrace of five houses set back from but facing Kensington High Street, with the road into Edwardes Square running alongside no.1, with the similar but longer Earl's Terrace on the other side.

The terrace was laid out and built from 1810 to 1819.

The entire terrace was acquired by Hugh Morton Shand (1815–1890), British army officer and businessman.

Alexander Faulkner Shand (1858–1936), the writer and barrister, and patrilineal great-grandfather of Queen Camilla, lived at no. 1.

The terrace was grade II listed in 1969.
