= Joshua Smith =

Joshua Smith may refer to:

== Sports ==
- Joshua Smith (soccer) (born 1992), American soccer center back
- Joshua Smith (basketball) (born 1992), American professional basketball center
- Joshua Smith (cricketer) (born 1992), English cricketer
- Joshua Smith (rugby union) (born 2004), New Zealand rugby union player

== Politics ==
- Joshua Smith (English politician) (1732–1819), English politician, Member of Parliament for Devizes 1788–1818
- Joshua Smith (New York politician) (1763–1845), New York politician, father of Joshua B. Smith
- Joshua B. Smith (1801–1860), New York politician, son of the above

== Other ==
- Joshua Smith (artist) (1905–1995), Australian artist
- Joshua Caleb Smith or Joshua C.S. (born 1984), American musician, singer, and songwriter
- Joshua Smith (minister) (1760–1795), American hymn compiler and Baptist minister
- Joshua Bowen Smith (1813–1879), American abolitionist and Underground Railroad conductor
- Joshua Fredric Smith (born c. 1981), American actor from Northern California
- Joshua I. Smith (born 1941), American businessman; chairman and managing partner of the Coaching Group, LLC
- Joshua R. Smith (born 1968), American computer scientist
- Joshua Toulmin Smith (1816–1869), British political theorist, lawyer and local historian of Birmingham

== See also ==
- Josh Smith (disambiguation)
