= Josh Wilson =

Josh or Joshua Wilson may refer to:

- Joshua Wilson (Maryland politician) (1797–1885), American politician and physician
- Josh Wilson (baseball) (born 1981), American baseball infielder
- Josh Wilson (musician) (born 1983), American contemporary Christian musician
- Josh Wilson (American football) (born 1985), American professional football player
- Josh Wilson (politician) (born 1972), member of the Australian House of Representatives
- Joshua Marie Wilkinson, born Joshua Wilson (born 1977), American poet, editor, and filmmaker

== See also ==
- Joshua Wilson Faulkner (fl. 1809–1820), English portrait painter
