= Joshua (disambiguation) =

Joshua is the central character of the Bible's Book of Joshua. The name may also refer to:

== People ==
- Joshua (name), a list of other people with the given name
- Joshua (surname)
- Joshua (footballer, born 2007), Brazilian footballer
- Joshua (American singer), member of K-pop group Seventeen
- Joshua (Italian singer), Italian singer and rapper
- Joshua (record producer), Danish music producer

== Music ==
- Joshua (Handel), a 1747 oratorio by George Frideric Handel
- Joshua (band), a metal band fronted by Joshua Perahia
- Joshua (album), 1971, by Dolly Parton
  - "Joshua" (song), the title song
- "Joshua" (jazz standard), a 1963 composition by Victor Feldman

== Film and television ==
- Joshua (1976 film), a Western film
- Joshua (2002 film), based upon the 1983 novel (see below)
- Joshua, a 2005 Nigerian film by Adim Williams
- Joshua (2007 film), a psychological horror film
- Joshua (2020 film), a Malayalam psychological film
- "Joshua" (Space Ghost Coast to Coast), a television episode

== Other uses ==
- Joshua, Texas, US, a city
- Joshua (novel), 1983, by Joseph Girzone
- Joshua, sailing ketch in which Bernard Moitessier and his wife Françoise made the longest nonstop passage by a yacht in history

== See also ==
- Yehoshua (disambiguation)
- Jesus (disambiguation)
- Jeshua (disambiguation)
- Iyasu (disambiguation), the Ge'ez equivalent used by Ethiopian Emperors
- Josue (disambiguation)
