= Benjamin Rawlinson Faulkner =

English painter

Benjamin Rawlinson Faulkner (1787–1849) was an English portrait-painter.

Faulkner was born in Manchester to William and Eliza Faulkner. He was at first engaged in the mercantile profession and for several years represented a large firm in their establishment at Gibraltar. When that place and its garrison were visited by the plague his health suffered so much that he was with difficulty brought home to England. This was about 1813 and during his convalescence he accidentally discovered a talent for drawing which was encouraged by his brother, J. W. Faulkner, an artist of some merit. Under his direction Faulkner devoted himself to assiduous study of the first principles of the art and spent upwards of two years in the study of the antique alone. He then came to London, and practised as a portrait-painter; but he was of so diffident a character and so retiring a disposition that his merits were not held in the same estimation in London as they were in his native town. He first exhibited at the Royal Academy in 1821, sending two portraits, and he continued to exhibit regularly up to the year before his death. His contributions were usually portraits, but he occasionally painted studies of natural objects. He resided for many years at 23 Newman Street, and died at North End, Fulham, in his sixty-third year, on 29 Oct. 1849. His best portraits are in Manchester or the neighbourhood. Portraits by him of John Dalton, F.R.S., and John McCulloch, the geologist, are in the Royal Society, London. He also contributed to the British Institution, Suffolk Street Gallery, Royal Manchester Institution, Liverpool Academy, and other exhibitions. A portrait of Sir John Ross, the Arctic explorer, was lithographed by R. J. Lane, A. R. A., and his pictures have been engraved by C. Heath, H. Robinson, and others. Besides painting, Faulkner was an accomplished musician, and was for some time organist at Irving's church in Hatton Garden.

His brother was the portrait artist, Joshua Wilson Faulkner.
