= Hirondina Joshua =

Mozambican poet (b. 1987)

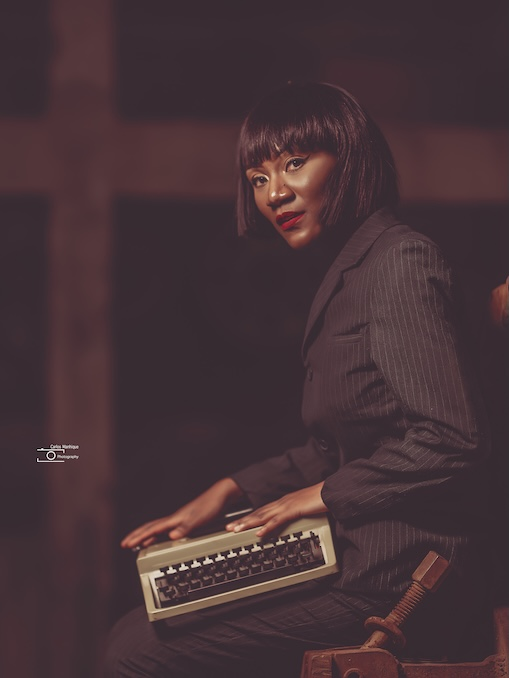
- Joshua in 2023
- Born: May 31, 1987 (age 39); Maputo, Mozambique
- Education: Eduardo Mondlane University
- Writing career
- Language: Portuguese
- Genres: Poetry, Short Story
- Notable awards: Extraordinary mention in Premio Mondiale di Poesia Nósside 2014
- Movement: Experimentalism
- Website: hirondinajoshua.com

Hirondina Joshua (born May 31, 1987, in Maputo), is a Mozambican poet, prose writer and jurist. She graduated in Law from the Eduardo Mondlane University. She is a member of the Mozambican Writers Association (Associação dos Escritores Moçambicanos - AEMO). Her works have been translated into several languages.. In Brazil, her book Os Ângulos da Casa was adapted into a modern dance piece. She participated in the Edinburgh International Book Festival, the largest public celebration of the written word in the world.

== Books published ==
=== Individual works ===
==== Poetry ====
- Os Ângulos da Casa. Preface Mia Couto. 2016. 1a. edição. Moçambique, ed. Fundação Fernando Leite Couto.
- A Estranheza Fora da Página. Co-authored with Ana Mafalda Leite. 2021. Edições Húmus. Colecção 12Catorze.
- Córtex. Preface Joana Bértholo. 2021. Editora Exclamação.

==== Short story ====
- Como Um Levita À Sombra dos Altares. Preface António Cabrita. 2021. Edições Húmus. Colecção 12Catorze. With illustrations by Newton Joaneth.

=== Anthologies and collective works ===
She has participated in several national and international anthologies, and her work has been published in newspapers and magazines in Mozambique, Portugal, Angola, Galicia, and Brazil.

- 2005. O Grasnar dos Corvos (Play). Co-authorship.
- 2006. Esperança e Certeza I. Mozambique, published by Associação dos Escritores Moçambicanos, pp. 47–49.
- 2008. Esperança e Certeza II. Mozambique, published by Associação dos Escritores Moçambicanos, pp. 63–65.
- 2012. A Minha Maputo É... Mozambique, published by Minerva, p. 45.
- 2014. Alquimia Del Fuego, organized by Sarah Schnabel, Santiago Aguaded Landero and Jack Landes. Spain, published by Amargord Ediciones, p. 481.
- 2020. Rio das Pérolas, organized by António Martins. Macau, ed. Ipsis Verbis.
- 2021. Português, Lugar de Escrita - Mulheres Na Poesia. Co-authorship. Organized by Casa Fernando Pessoa.
- 2022. Este imenso mar - Antologia de autores contemporâneos de língua portuguesa. Antologia. Portugal, ed. Camões, Instituto da Cooperação e da Língua, p. 53.
- 2022. Ecos de Moçambique - Um século de José Craveirinha. Author Lola Geraldes Xavier. ed. Blucher, pp. 249–250.
- 2023. A boca no ouvido de alguém, organized by Tiago Alves Costa. Preface Ondjaki. ed. Através.
- 2023. O Concerto das Letras - Contos inspirados em música, organized by Jessica Cardin. Preface Leandro Karnal. Brazil. ed. Tipografia Musical.

== International events ==
- 2019 - Participated in the 8th edition of the Macau Literary Festival (The Script Road - Macau Literary Festival).
- 2020 - Participated in the 21st edition of the Correntes d'Escritas Literary Festival in Portugal.
- 2022 - Participated in the XXXVII edition of the Barcelona International Poetry Festival in Spain.
- 2022 - Participated in the Lisbon Revisited 2022 - Days of Poetry.
- 2023 - Participated in the Edinburgh International Book Festival.
- 2024 - Participated in the Jornadas Luso-Andaluzas de Poesía.

== Awards and distinctions ==
- 2014 - Premio Mondiale di Poesia Nósside: received an honorable mention, offered by UNESCO's international poetry board, with the work Invenção.
- 2022 - With the book Córtex, translated into Spanish and published in Mexico through the Translation and Editing Support Line (LATE) 2022, Camões I.P. and the Directorate-General of Books, Archives and Libraries (DGLAB) have set up a Bibliographic Fund for distribution by the Camões I.P. teaching networks.
