= Hugh Morton Shand =

British army officer (1815–1890)

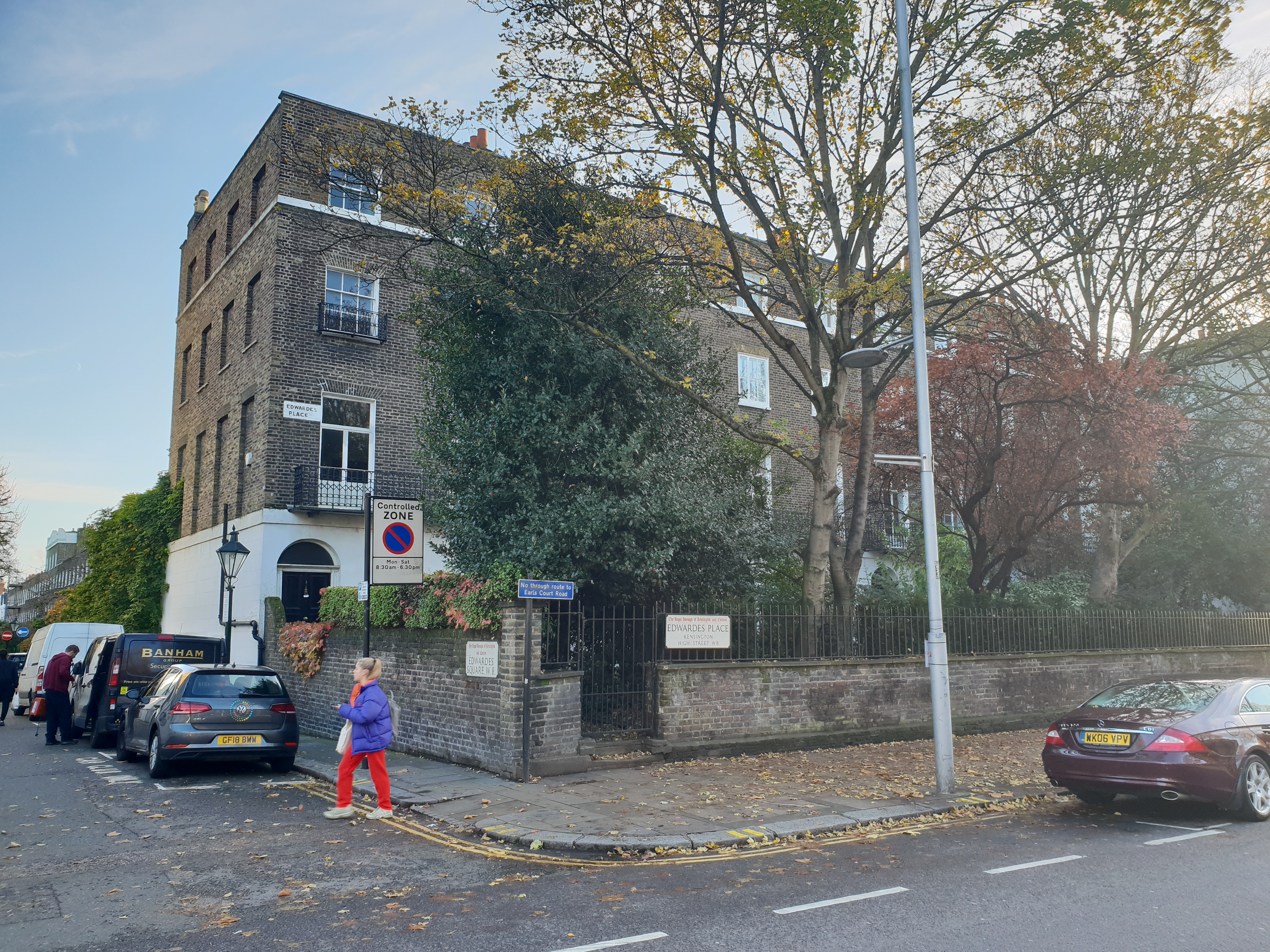
Edwardes Place in 2018

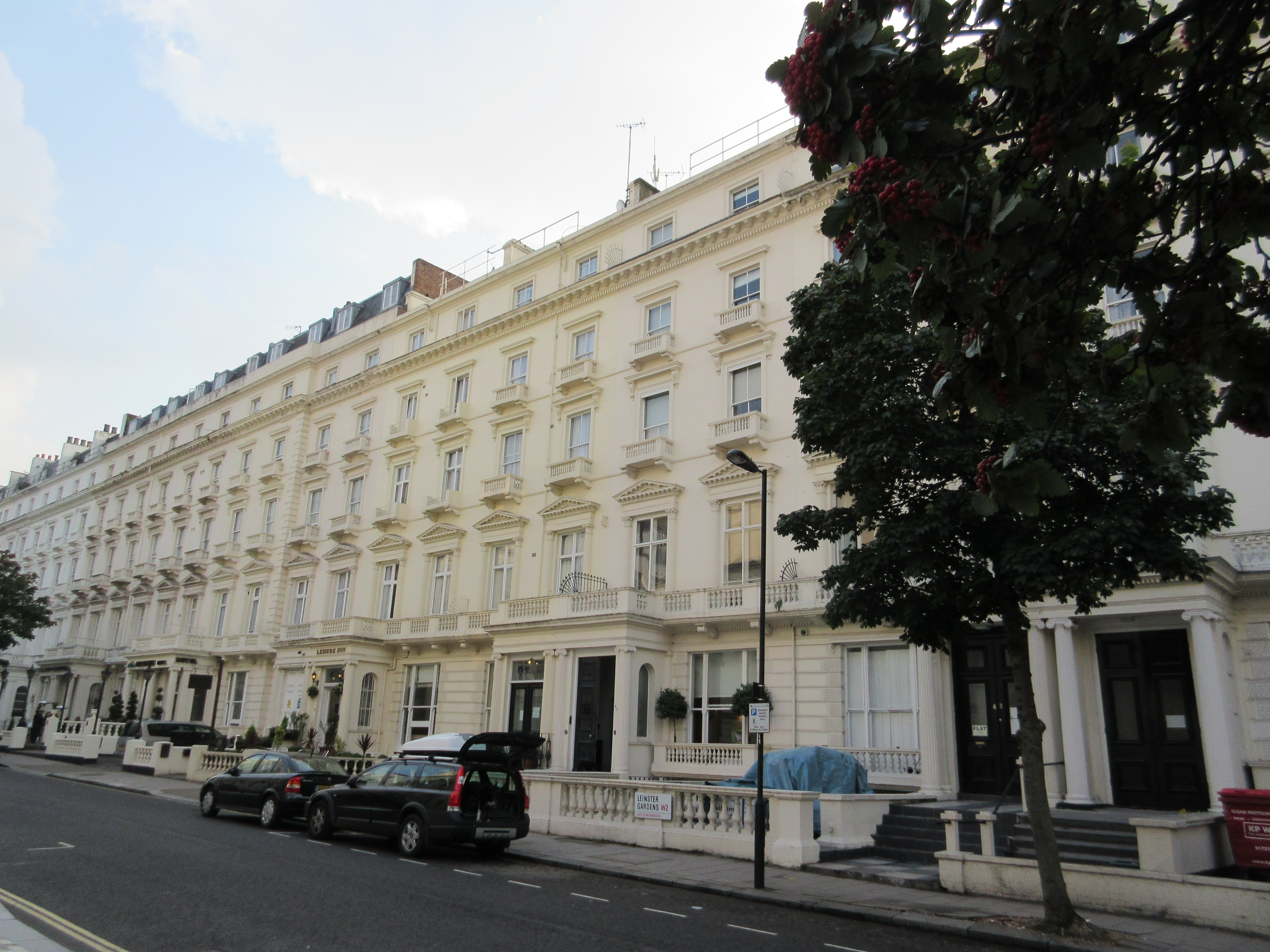
Leinster Gardens in 2014

Hugh Morton Shand (13 January 1815 – 24 June 1890) was a British army officer and businessman, the son of Alexander Garden Shand and Isabella Shand nee Morton. He is the patrilineal great-great-grandfather of Queen Camilla.

He served with the British army, went to India and founded a trading company.

He bought Edwardes Place, a terrace of five houses in Kensington, London.

In 1857, he married Edrica Faulkner (1822–1890), daughter of an "itinerant portrait painter", and they had three sons:

- Alexander Faulkner Shand, (1858–1936) writer and barrister, and patrilineal great-grandfather of Queen Camilla.

He died on 24 June 1890 at 13 Leinster Gardens, London.
