= Iyasu =

Eyesus (Geʽez: ኢየሱስ ) is an Ethiopian name meaning Jesus. It can also mean Yasu (or Yashu), or Yesu. Yehusha

Various Ethiopian Emperors have used the name including:

- Iyasu I of Ethiopia (also known as the Great) (1682 – 1706)
- Iyasu II of Ethiopia (1730 – 1755)
- Iyasu III of Ethiopia (1784 – 1788)
- Iyasu IV of Ethiopia (1830 – 1832)
- Lij Iyasu of Ethiopia (1913 – 1916) (uncrowned and excommunicated by the Ethiopian Orthodox Tewahedo Church, not referred to publicly as Iyasu V. His only child Alem Tsahai Iyasu was titled Emebethoi by Emperor Haile Selassie)

Three claimants to the throne also used Iyasu:

- Yeshaq Iyasu claimed the title nəgusä nägäst (1685) of Ethiopia, opponent of Iyasu I
- Girma Yohannis Iyasu (1961–present) – Iyasuist claimant to the abolished throne of Ethiopia
- Atse Iyasu – was proclaimed nəgusä nägäst (1787–1788) of Ethiopia in Tigray and Gojjam by enemies of Ras Ali I of Yejju

== See also ==
- Ieyasu
