= Joshua R. Smith =

American computer scientist

Joshua R. Smith is an American computer scientist and electrical engineer and a professor at the University of Washington. He is known for research on wireless power (including WREL), backscatter communication (including WISP and Ambient Backscatter), and robotic manipulation.

== Education and academic career ==
He received a PhD degree from MIT in 1999, SM from MIT in 1995, MA from Cambridge University in Physics in 1997, and a dual BA in Computer Science and Philosophy from Williams College in 1991. He was at Intel Labs Seattle from 2004 to 2010, and joined the faculty of the University of Washington (UW) in 2011. He is the Milton and Delia Zeutschel Professor in Entrepreneurial Excellence at the University of Washington and leads the UW Sensor Systems Lab and is the founding director of the UW-Amazon Science Hub.

He is a Fellow of the National Academy of Inventors; a Fellow of the Institute of Electrical and Electronics Engineers, recognized for "contributions to far‐ and near‐field wireless power, backscatter communication, and electric field sensing"; and a 2013 Allen Distinguished Investigator.

== Entrepreneurship and commercial applications ==
Several startup companies are commercializing technology from his lab, under license from the University of Washington: Wibotic, Proprio, Waveworks (formerly Jeeva,) and Corisma. His PhD research at MIT was commercialized to make a smart airbag system.
