= Joshua A. Jones =

American media executive

Joshua Jones
- Born: Union, South Carolina
- Education: Hardin–Simmons University, University of North Texas
- Employer(s): Metro Broadcasters, Inc.

Joshua Jones is an American media executive in the Dallas–Fort Worth market. He oversees two radio stations for Metro Broadcasters, Inc., and owns half of (and operates) a record label with his promotional partner Shiner Bock. Jones is also a consultant for businesses trying to use music to brand themselves and for artists trying to introduce their music to larger audiences.

== Biography ==
=== Early life and education ===
Jones earned a bachelor's degree from Hardin–Simmons University in 1996. He earned a master's in media studies from the University of North Texas in 2009.

=== Career ===
Jones is often credited as a pioneer in the Texas/Americana music scene. One of the stations he oversees, KHYI, became on January 1, 1997 the first 24-hour commercial Americana radio station in the United States. In an effort to lure male listeners back to country radio, KHYbegan shunning the "…flat-belly, pretty boy, disco country music" that targeted a female demographic and dominated country radio at the time.

He is featured in the documentary The Range, a film by Dean Augustin.
