= Joshua Miles =

Joshua Miles may refer to:

- Joshua Weldon Miles (1858–1929), American politician
- Joshua Miles (American football), American football offensive tackle
