= Yehoshua (surname) =

Yehoshua is a Hebrew surname that is presumably derived directly from the English transliteration of יהושע, which means roughly "YHWH rescues" or "YHWH is salvation".

"Yehoshua" יהושע was also the Hebrew name for Joshua and has been used as a masculine given name. A common alternative form of the name יְהוֹשֻׁעַ ("Yehoshuah" - Joshua) in later books of the Hebrew Bible and among Jews of the Second Temple period is ישוע yēšūă‘.

This surname is sufficiently rare to apparently not appear in the United States Census of 1990.

This surname is shared by several notable people:

- A. B. Yehoshua (1936–2022), Israeli novelist, essayist, and playwright
- Itzhak Yehoshua (born 1962), Chief Rabbi of the Bukharian Jews in the United States

== See also ==
- Yeshua (name)
