= Josh Nalley =

American restaurant manager and TikToker

- Born: 1980 or 1981 (age 44–45); Kentucky, U.S.
- Occupations: Restaurant manager, TikToker

TikTok information
- Page: Josh Nalley
- Years active: 2020–2025
- Followers: 156.8 thousand
- Last updated: January 4, 2026

Josh Nalley (born 1980/1981) is an American restaurant manager and TikToker. He is best known for his video series of posting himself playing dead everyday to get cast as a dead guy in a television series or film for 321 days on TikTok.

In October 2021, Nalley began a video series where he posted himself playing dead everyday on TikTok, hoping to get cast as a dead guy in a television series or film. After 321 days of posting, he was cast as a dead guy in an episode of the CBS crime drama television series CSI: Vegas, which after his appearance, he continued his video series of playing dead everyday.

On August 3, 2025, Nalley ended his video series of playing dead everyday on TikTok, marking the end of hoping to get cast again as a dead guy in another television series or film.
