= Murder of Joshua Wilkerson =

2010 murder in Texas, United States

On November 16, 2010, eighteen-year-old Joshua Wilkerson was murdered by his classmate Hermilo Moralez, who was an illegal immigrant to the United States from Belize. Both boys were students at an alternative school for at-risk students in Pearland, Texas (a suburb of Houston). Wilkerson was reported missing after his abandoned truck was located in a strip mall parking lot. A massive search began on the morning of November 17. Moralez, who was nineteen at the time of the murder, became a suspect when the police noticed him loitering in the area near Wilkerson's abandoned truck. At first he denied having anything to do with the crime, but he gave the police false information about his identity which raised their suspicions. Moralez eventually confessed and led officers to the body.

According to court documents, Moralez stated that Wilkerson gave him a ride home from school on November 16. He claimed they began to argue and got out of the truck. He confessed to using a large wooden rod to beat Wilkerson to death. Moralez stated that he then put the body into Wilkerson's truck and drove to a desolate location where he dumped the body. Wilkerson's body was found with his hands and feet tied. He had been severely beaten, strangled, tortured, and burned. The condition of Wilkerson's body, and the fact that he was tied up, raised questions as to whether the murder was simply an argument that got out of hand, or an intentionally planned murder.

Moralez was charged with first-degree murder, failure to identify, and attempting to take a weapon from an officer. Investigators said Moralez, while handcuffed, tried to pull a detective's weapon from his holster as they jumped a fence in a field. He was immediately restrained, police said. He also provided a false identity when he was questioned. During his trial, Moralez took the stand in his own defense and admitted to beating Wilkerson in his home after the two had an argument. Moralez then drove Wilkerson's body across the county line and left it in a rural area. After the jury deliberated less than 30 minutes, Moralez was convicted and then sentenced to life in prison. Moralez appealed his conviction, but the court overruled all of his issues, and affirmed the judgment of the trial court.

Less than five months before the murder, Moralez had been convicted of harassment of his ex-girlfriend and jailed. However, the authorities failed to recognise him as an illegal immigrant on that occasion and therefore failed to deport him.

== Mother's campaigning ==
In 2015 the victim's mother, Laura Wilkerson, testified before the Senate Judiciary Committee about her son's murder and sanctuary cities. She stated: "You're officially notified today there is a problem when this happens," and "You're either for Americans or you're not!"

== See also ==
- Angel Families
- Illegal immigration to the United States
- Illegal immigration to the United States and crime
