= Josh Ross (disambiguation) =

Josh Ross (born 1996) is a Canadian country singer and songwriter.

Josh Ross may also refer to:

- Josh Ross (sprinter) (born 1981), Australian sprinter
- Josh Ross (American football) (born 1999), American football player
