= Jésus =

Jésus is a French male given name of Hebrew origin. It derives from the Hebrew name of Jesus. Notable people with the name include:

- Jésus Arenzana (1918–2011), French wrestler
- Jésus Konnsimbal (born 1992), Central African footballer
