= Joshua Wilson Faulkner =

English painter

Joshua Wilson Faulkner (baptised 28 February 1783 – 5 October 1874) was an English portrait painter.

He was the son of William and Eliza Faulkner and the elder brother of fellow painter Benjamin Rawlinson Faulkner. Through his daughter Edrica he was the maternal grandfather of Alexander Faulkner Shand. He also practised as a portrait-painter in Manchester. He exhibited at the Royal Academy, and about 1817 settled in London. He exhibited for the last time in 1820. He painted in miniature.

He died at The Philippines estate near Sevenoaks, Kent, aged 91.
