= Josh Thomas =

Josh Thomas may refer to:

== American football players ==
- Josh Thomas (defensive end) (born 1981), American football defensive end
- Josh Thomas (cornerback) (born 1989), American football cornerback
- Josh Thomas (safety) (born 1996), American football safety

== Other sportspeople ==
- Josh Thomas (Australian footballer) (born 1991), Australian rules footballer for Collingwood
- Josh Thomas (footballer, born 1999), English footballer
- Josh Thomas (footballer, born 2002), Welsh footballer
- Josh Thomas (rugby union) (born 2000), Welsh rugby union player
- Josh Thomas (English cricketer) (born 2005), English cricketer
- Josh Thomas (West Indian cricketer) (born 1991), West Indian cricketer

== Other people ==
- Josh Thomas (blues guitarist) (born 1970), Australian blues guitarist
- Josh Thomas (comedian) (born 1987), Australian comedian, actor and writer
- Josh Thomas (politician), Virginia politician

== See also ==
- Joshua Mark Thomas (born 1973), American interior designer and photographer
