= Jesús Rodríguez =

Jesús Rodríguez may refer to:

== Academics ==
- Jesús Kumate Rodríguez (1924–2018), Mexican physician and politician
- Jesús Ancer Rodríguez (born 1952), Mexican researcher and physician

== Artists ==
- Sixto Rodriguez (1942–2023), also known as Jesús Rodríguez, American folk musician
- Jesús Rodríguez Picó (born 1953), Spanish composer and clarinet player
- El Koala (Jesús Manuel Rodríguez, born 1970), Spanish musician

== Politicians ==
- Jesús Rodríguez Almeida (born 1971), Mexican politician, interim governor of Puebla
- Jesús Rodríguez (Argentine politician) (born 1955), Argentine politician
- Jesús Rodríguez Hernández (born 1955), Mexican politician
- Jesús Santa Rodríguez (born 1964), Puerto Rican politician
- Jesús Márquez Rodríguez (born 1966), Puerto Rican politician

== Sportspeople ==
=== Association football ===
- Jesús Rodríguez (Venezuelan footballer) (born 1968), Venezuelan football midfielder
- Jesús Rodríguez (Mexican footballer) (born 1993), Mexican football goalkeeper
- Jesús Rodríguez (Colombian footballer) (born 1993), Colombian football forward
- Jesús Rodríguez (footballer, born 2005), Spanish football winger

=== Other sports ===
- Jesús Rodríguez (baseball) (born 2002), Venezuelan professional baseball catcher
- Jesús Rodríguez (freestyle wrestler) (born 1967), Cuban wrestler
- Jesús Rodríguez Gonzáles (1939–1995), Cuban chess player, International Master
- Jesús Rodríguez Magro (1960–2018), Spanish cyclist
- Jesús Rodríguez (professional wrestler) (born 1986), Mexican American professional wrestler and ring announcer also known as Ricardo Rodriguez
- Jesús Rodríguez (weightlifter) (1933–2018), Spanish Olympic weightlifter
- Jesús Rodríguez, Venezuelan javelin thrower and winner in athletics at the 1962 Central American and Caribbean Games
