= Joshua Caslari =

Joshua Caslari was a Jewish liturgical poet who lived at Avignon about 1540. He wrote four elegies which are inserted in the manuscript Machzor of Avignon; his signature is found at the end of the last. Joshua Caslari is in all probability identical with the Jozué du Cayslar, named with Ferussol Pampelona, in a document dated 15 June 1558, as member-elect of the council of the Jewish community of Avignon.
