= Josh Kelly =

Josh Kelly may refer to:

- Josh Kelly (actor) (born 1982), American actor
- Josh Kelly (Australian footballer) (born 1995), Australian footballer
- Josh Kelly (footballer, born 1998), English footballer
- Josh Kelly (American football) (born 2001), American football player
- Josh Kelly (boxer) (born 1994), British boxer

== See also ==
- Josh Kelley (born 1980), American musician
- Joshua Kelley (born 1997), American football player
- Joshua Kelley (sailor) (born 1993/1994), non-binary United States Navy sailor selected to be the service's digital ambassador
