= De Jesus =

De Jesús or DeJesus
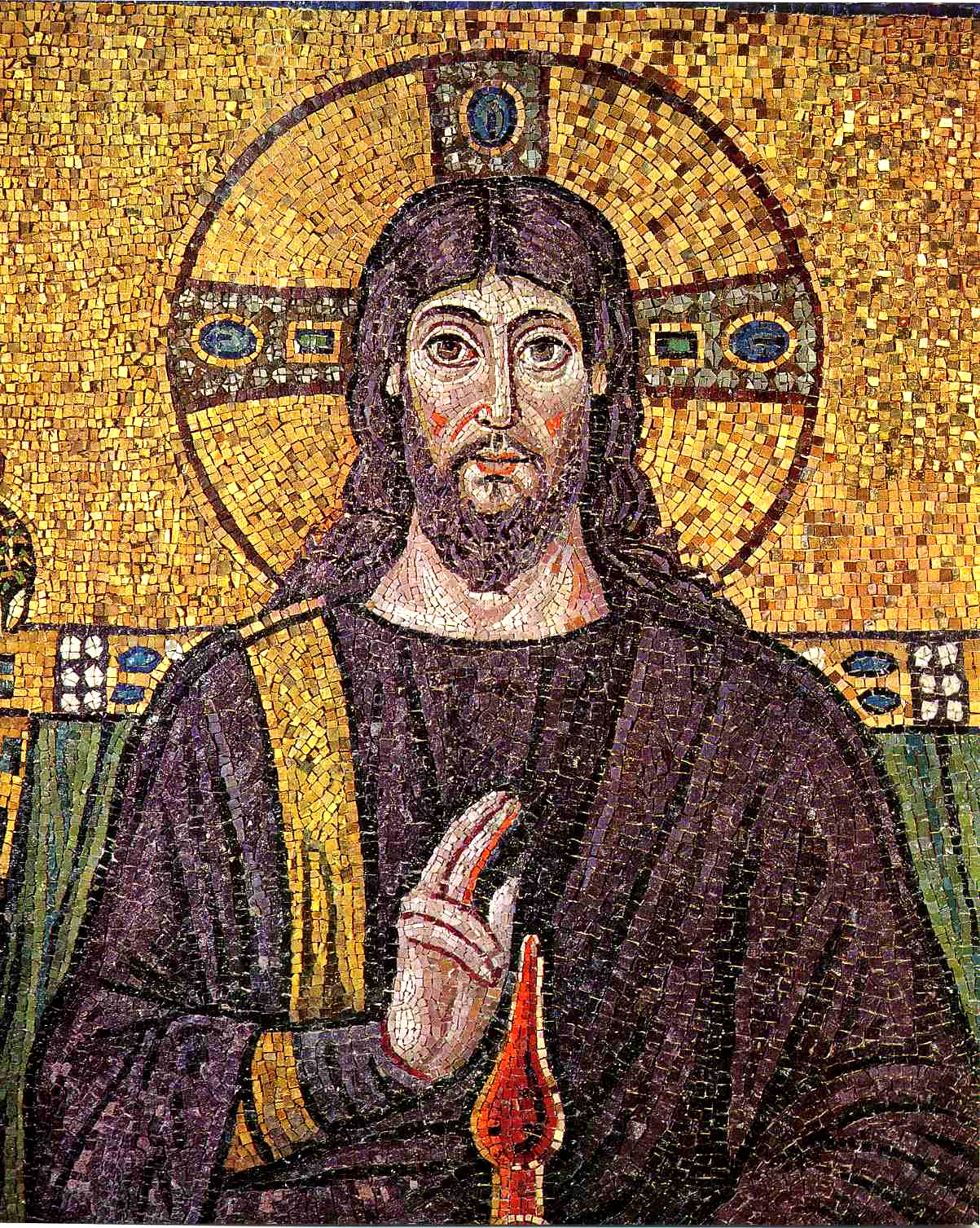
- Language: Spanish/Portuguese

Origin
- Meaning: "Of Jesus"
- Region of origin: Spain Portugal

Other names
- Variant form: de Jesus

De Jesús, DeJesus, or capitalized as de Jesús, de Jesus (/də heɪˈsuːs/; Spanish: [de xeˈsus], Portuguese: [ðɨ ʒeˈzuʃ]) is a Spanish and Portuguese surname (meaning of Jesus) and a common family name in the Hispanic and Lusophone worlds. In the year 2000, there were 26,336 people of Hispanic/Latino origin in the United States with the surname De Jesus, making 172nd in order of frequency for all Hispanic/Latino surnames, and 1,002nd most common surname in the U.S. A decade later in 2010, the U.S. Census Bureau surveyed 44,038 people with the last name Dejesus, making it the 783rd most common surname in the U.S. DeJesus is found throughout Latin America, but most prevalent in Brazil with nearly 2,000,000 bearers with second place going to Mexico. In the Philippines, De Jesus (or de Jesus) is the 33rd most common surname, held by about 1.1% of the population and 51st most common surname in Puerto Rico.

The surname is found most frequently in the following countries:

- 1,963,741 Brazil
- 136,454 Mexico
- 79,480 Philippines
- 10,061 Dominican Republic
- 9,008 Puerto Rico
- 5,167 Colombia
- 4,582 Spain
- 2,702 Venezuela
- 1,856 Argentina
- 1,427 Honduras

== People ==
- Infanta Ana de Jesus Maria of Braganza, Portuguese princess
- Adolfo de Jesús Constanzo, American serial killer, occultist, and drug trafficker
- Alex de Jesús, Puerto Rican professional boxer
- Ángel De Jesús, Dominican baseball player
- Benjamin de Jesus (1940–1997), assassinated Philippine Roman Catholic bishop
- Carlos DeJesus, radio and television personality
- David DeJesus, American Major League Baseball player
- Enmanuel De Jesus, Venezuelan baseball player
- Esteban de Jesús, Puerto Rican world lightweight champion boxer
- Fábio de Jesus, Brazilian footballer
- Francisco de Jesus, Brazilian boxer
- Gabriel Fernando de Jesus, Brazilian footballer
- Gina DeJesus, American abduction survivor
- Gregoria de Jesús, part of the Philippine Revolution
- Iván DeJesús, Major League Baseball player from Puerto Rico
- Iván DeJesús Jr., Puerto Rican professional baseball player
- Jacob De Jesus (born 2002), American football player
- Jesús María de Jesús Moya (1934–2026), Dominican Roman Catholic bishop
- José DeJesús, Puerto Rican Major League Baseball player
- José Corazón de Jesús, also known as Huseng Batute, a Filipino poet
- José de Jesús Corona, Mexican international football goalkeeper
- José Luis de Jesús, founder and leader of Creciendo en Gracia
- Rick DeJesus, lead singer of band Adelitas Way
- Roberto de Jesús, beach volleyball player from Dominican Republic
- Robenílson de Jesus, boxer from Brazil
- Robin de Jesús, Puerto Rican film and theatre actor
- Sophina DeJesus, American gymnast
- Vanessa de Jesus, Filipino-American basketball player
- Vincent de Jesus, Philippine composer, arranger and musical director
- Wanda De Jesus, American actress
