= Joshua C. Pierce =

American politician (1830–1904)

Joshua C. Pierce (December 8, 1830 – June 13, 1904) was an American businessman and politician.

Pierce was born in Nashua, New Hampshire, and attended the Academy of New Hampshire to take a surveying course. He settled in Red Wing, Minnesota, in 1855 with his wife and family. Pierce was involved with the banking and land businesses in Red Wing. A Democrat, Pierce served in the Minnesota House of Representatives in 1872.
