= Jesús Alique =

Spanish politician (born 1962)

Jesús Alique (born 1 January 1962, in Sacedón, Guadalajara) is a Spanish politician.

Alique graduated with a law degree from the University of Alcalá, and began to develop his political activity in the middle of the 1980s when he joined the Partido Socialista Obrero Español (PSOE). In the municipal elections of 1991 he was elected councilor for his native city until 1995. In the municipal elections of that year, he appeared in the candidates list of the PSOE for Guadalajara, where he was chosen, and became a deputy in the provincial assembly. In 1999 was already head of the PSOE list and candidate for Mayor of Guadalajara.

In the municipal elections of 2003 he was again chosen mayor but was not re-elected in 2007. In the 2008 elections he was a PSOE candidate to the Congress of Deputies for Guadalajara district and was elected to the Spanish parliament. Within the PSOE, he has been Secretary General for the party in Guadalajara.
