= Josué Augusto Durán =

Ecuadorian writer

Josué Augusto Durán Hermida is an Ecuadorian writer. He won the 2019 Premio Nacional de Literatura Aurelio Espinoza Pólit for his book Minutas de Bulla.

Duran comes from a cultural family in Cuenca. He is the grandson of the writer César Hermida, who won the 2019 Premio Nacional de Novela Breve ‘La Linares’ for his work Amoríos. Duran studied literature in Barcelona and now lives in Amsterdam. He has contributed to Ecuadorian publications such as Cartón Piedra, where he discussed the works of Celan and Cavafy.
