= Josh Gordon (disambiguation) =

Josh Gordon is the name of:

- Josh Gordon (born 1991) American football player
- Josh Gordon (director), American film director
- Josh Gordon (footballer) (born 1994), English footballer for Barrow
