= Josh Brown =

Josh or Joshua Brown may refer to:

- Josh Brown (actor) (born 1990), British television actor
- Josh Brown (American football) (born 1979), American football kicker
- Josh Brown (cricketer) (born 1993), Australian cricket player
- Josh Brown (ice hockey) (born 1994), Canadian ice hockey player
- Josh Brown (musician) (born 1976), lead vocalist of Christian rock band Day of Fire
- Joshua Brown (historian), American social historian
- Joshua Brown (Texas pioneer) (1816–1874), first settler of US city of Kerrville, Texas
- Joshua Brown (writer) (born 1977), American finance and investment writer
- Joshua Brown, a prosecution witness for the murder of Botham Jean who was killed before the trial
- Joshua Brown (died 2016), the first U.S. driver to die while driving a semi-autonomous car
- Joshua Macave Brown, American convicted murderer of Jesse Dirkhising

== See also ==
- J. T. Brown (ice hockey) (Joshua Thomas Brown, born 1990), American ice hockey player
