= Reiner Leist =

- Born: 1964 (age 61–62); West Germany
- Occupation: Studio art professor

Reiner Leist (born 1964 in West Germany), is a German-born photographer, who emigrated to the United States and lives in New York City. Leist is currently a professor in studio art at Hunter College, The City University of New York.

== Biography ==
=== Early life ===
Born in West Germany in 1964, Reiner Leist emigrated to South Africa in 1988 and then from South Africa to the United States in 1994.

He studied Visual Arts and Photography in Munich, Cape Town and New York City.

=== Career ===
His works are ongoing, often participatory projects, which examine the relationship between individual lives and societies, history, landscape and architecture. For instance, Leist submitted an entry to the World Trade Center site Memorial Competition in which he proposed erecting 2,792 memorial telephone booths around the "footprints" of the former WTC site, around New York City or in any of the 92 counties where victims were from. The phones would be arbitrarily connected to another memorial phone and would let callers talk with each other or hear a pre-recorded message about a victim of the WTC disaster. His entry did not win.

Since 1994, Leist has worked on "American Portraits" and since 2001 on several projects in Asia.

Leist stated in an interview for CUNY TV "I just work very slowly. I can't work fast. I can't do projects in a short period." From 1995 to 2005, Leist took photographs of metropolitan life through the window of his 26th floor New York apartment on 8th Avenue, using a 19th-century full plate camera. He took pictures each day he was in New York, whenever he found the time, at every time of day, in all kinds of weather and every position of the sun. The resulting bulk of around 4,500 photographs documents both the every-day life and change of Manhattan, including the historic event of the destruction of the World Trade Center on September 11, 2001. Parts of the collection have been published in book form under the title Eleven Septembers: Photographs by REINER LEIST.

He has had numerous exhibitions in Germany, USA and Japan.

Leist taught in the Visual Arts Program at MIT, Cambridge, Massachusetts. from 2000 until 2003 and is currently a professor in studio art at Hunter College, The City University of New York.

== Works ==
- Santlofer, Jonathan and Derenthal, Ludger, Eleven Septembers: Photographs by Reiner Leist (Prestel Publishing, 2006).
