= Josh Smith (disambiguation) =

Josh Smith (born 1985) is an American basketball player.

Josh Smith may also refer to:

== Arts and entertainment ==
- Josh Smith (artist) (born 1976), American artist based in New York
- Josh Smith (musician) (born 1979), American blues guitarist
- Josh Smith, American musician, bassist for Halestorm
- Josh Smith, American lead singer for Ashes Remain

== Sports ==
=== Australian rules football ===
- Josh Smith (footballer, born 1986), Australian forward
- Josh Smith (footballer, born 1994), Australian midfielder

=== Baseball ===
- Josh Smith (left-handed pitcher) (born 1989), American
- Josh Smith (right-handed pitcher) (born 1987), American
- Josh Smith (infielder) (born 1997), American

=== Other sports ===
- Josh Smith (rugby league, born 1979), Australian rugby league footballer
- Josh Smith (rugby league, born 2001), Australian rugby league footballer
- Josh Smith (runner) (1877–1954), British track and field athlete
- Josh Smith (soccer) (born 1982), American soccer midfielder
- Josh Smith (footballer, born 2005), English football defender

== See also ==
- Joshua Smith (disambiguation)
