= Josh Hall =

Josh Hall may refer to:

== Sports ==
- Josh Hall (baseball) (born 1980), American baseball player
- Josh Hall (basketball) (born 2000), American basketball player
- Josh Hall (footballer) (born 1990), Australian rules footballer and former high jumper
- Josh Hall (sailor) (born 1962), British yachtsman

== Others ==
- Josh Hall (One Life to Live), a fictional character on the American soap opera

== See also ==
- Joshua Hall (disambiguation)
