= Rookie Jones =

Professional baseball player

- Center fielder
- Batted: Unknown Threw: Unknown

Negro league baseball debut
- 1932, for the Memphis Red Sox

Last appearance
- 1932, for the Memphis Red Sox
- Stats at Baseball Reference

Teams
- Memphis Red Sox (1932)

Joshua "Rookie" Jones was a professional baseball center fielder in the Negro leagues. He played with the Memphis Red Sox in 1932.
