= Josué Galindo =

Honduran footballer (born 2006)

Personal information
- Full name: Josué Isaac Cárcamo Galindo
- Date of birth: 9 August 2006 (age 20)
- Position: Midfielder

Team information
- Current team: Victoria
- Number: 34

Youth career
- –2021: Victoria

Senior career*
Years	Team	Apps	(Gls)
2021–	Victoria	9	(0)
- * Club domestic league appearances and goals as of 4 November 2021

Josué Isaac Cárcamo Galindo (born 9 August 2006) is a Honduran professional footballer who plays as a midfielder for Victoria.

== Career statistics ==
=== Club ===
As of 4 November 2021.

Club	Season	League			Cup		Continental		Other		Total	
Club	Season	Division	Apps	Goals	Apps	Goals	Apps	Goals	Apps	Goals	Apps	Goals
Victoria	2021–22	Liga Salva-Vida	9	0	0	0	–		0	0	9	0
Career total			9	0	0	0	0	0	0	0	9	0
