= Josh Williams =

Josh or Joshua Williams may refer to:

== Sports ==
- Josh Williams (American football executive) (born 1987), American football executive
- Josh Williams (defensive tackle) (born 1976), former American football player, NFL defensive tackle
- Josh Williams (running back) (born 2001), American football running back
- Josh Williams (Australian footballer) (born 1998), Australian rules football player for North Melbourne
- Josh Williams (English footballer) (born 2002), English association football player
- Josh Williams (soccer) (born 1988), American soccer player
- Josh Williams (racing driver) (born 1993), American professional stock car racing driver
- Joshua Williams (boxer) (born 1941), Ghanaian boxer
- Joshua Williams (cornerback) (born 1999), American football player, NFL cornerback
- Josh Williams (Welsh footballer) (born 2004), Welsh footballer

== Other ==
- Josh Williams (Gowalla), American Internet entrepreneur, founder and former CEO of Gowalla
- Joshua Williams (lawyer) (1837–1915), New Zealand lawyer, politician, Supreme Court judge and university chancellor
- Joshua Williams (legal writer) (1813–1881), English barrister and legal author in the field of property law
- Joshua Williams (musician) (born 1974), American drummer
- J. Williams (singer) (Joshua Elia Williams, born 1986), New Zealand R&B singer
- Josh Williams (politician), American politician

== See also ==
- Joss Williams (born 1984), special effects supervisor
