= Jesus College =

Jesus College may refer to:

- Jesus College, Cambridge
- Jesus College, Oxford
