= Jesus H. Christ =

Expletive interjection referencing religious figure Jesus Christ

Jesus H. Christ is an expletive interjection that refers to the Abrahamic religious figure of Jesus. It is typically uttered in anger, surprise, or frustration, although often with humorous intent.

== History ==
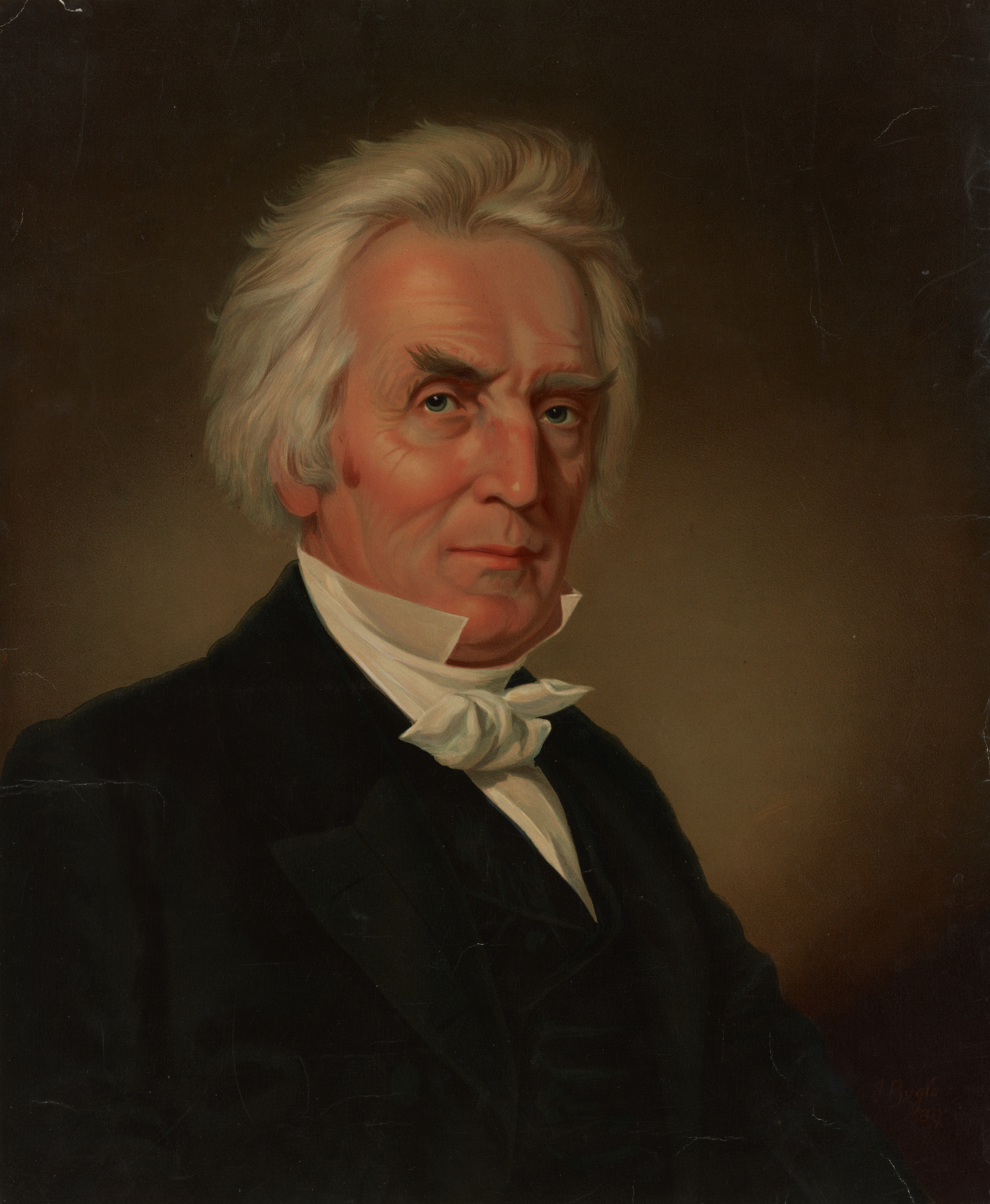
Alexander Campbell in c. 1855

The earliest use of the phrase is unknown. In his autobiography, Mark Twain (1835–1910) observed that it was in general use even in his childhood. Twain refers to an episode from 1847, when he was working as a printer's apprentice; Roger Smith (1994) tells the tale thus:

[Twain] recounts a practical joke a friend played on a revival preacher when Twain was an apprentice in a printing shop that Alexander Campbell, a famous evangelist then visiting Hannibal, hired to print a pamphlet of his sermon. While checking the galleys, Twain's fellow apprentice, Wales McCormick, found he had to make room for some dropped words, which he managed by shortening Jesus Christ on the same line to J. C. as soon as Campbell had read the proofs, he swept indignantly into the shop and commanded McCormick, "So long as you live, don't you ever diminish the Savior's name again. Put it all in." The puckish McCormick obeyed, and then some: he set Jesus H. Christ and printed up all the pamphlets.

An early printed usage appeared in The Morning Democrat of Davenport, Iowa, on May 20, 1857, where the phrase was quoted as a novel expression and an example of increasingly elaborate profanity: "By Jesus H. Christ it is so."

Roger Smith suggests that "Jesus H. Christ" is a specifically American profanity, and indicates that at least in his experience it is uttered primarily by men. British writer Michael Quinion likewise specifies the phrase as belonging to American English. Angus Hector MacLean, however, reports use of the expression by a young female around 1900 in rural Cape Breton, Nova Scotia, Canada, indicating traditional use in Maritime English.

== Stress pattern ==
Multiple authors emphasize the practice of placing a strong stress on the "H", relating it in various ways to expletive infixation. Thus Quinion writes:

Its long survival must have a lot to do with its cadence, and the way that an especially strong stress can be placed on the H. You might also think of it as an example of emphatic infixing that loosely fits the models of words like abso-bloody-lutely or tribu-bloody-lation.

Similar remarks were made by the linguist Dwight Bolinger, who mentions "Jesus H. Christ" in a discussion of the strategies used by English speakers to add additional stresses to "highly charged words" for purposes of emphasis. Horberry suggests "The strong emphasis on the H somehow improves the rhythm of its host phrase." The Green's Dictionary of Slang says "the H is redundant other than for rhythm".

== Etymology ==
The divine monogram, conjectured to be the source of "Jesus H. Christ"

Using the name of Jesus Christ as an oath has been common for many centuries, but the precise origins of the letter H in the expression are obscure. While many explanations have been proposed, the most widely accepted derivation is from the divine monogram of Christian symbolism. The symbol, derived from the first three letters of the Greek name of Jesus (ΙΗΣΟΥΣ), is transliterated iota-eta-sigma, which can look like IHS, ΙΗϹ (with lunate sigma), JHS, or JHC ("J" was historically a mere variant of "I"). This hypothesis was given in 1905 by B. G. Blade and in the 1907 text The Toil of Life by Englishman Francis Stopford when the phrase is used by an Arkansas man.

For how this learned-sounding abbreviation could have served as the basis for vulgar slang, Smith offers the hypothesis that it was noticed by ordinary people when it was worn as a decoration on the vestments of Anglican (i.e., in America, Episcopal) clergy. The "JHC" variant would particularly invite interpretation of the "H" as part of a name.

=== False etymology ===
While the above is the most likely origin of the "H", there are other popular false etymologies. One commonly held origin is as an initial for the name "Harold", which is mentioned by Smith as the basis of a variant form, "Jesus Harold Christ". The "Harold" may arise from a common misinterpretation (often by children) of the phrase in the Lord's Prayer, "Our Father who art in heaven, hallowed be thy name", which can be mistakenly interpreted as specifying the name of the Deity ("thy name is ... "), rather than the true reading, which is "may thy name be hallowed". The confusion would arise from the phonetic similarity of hallowed (IPA [ˈhæloʊd]) to Harold (IPA [ˈhærəld]).

=== Facetious etymology ===
In a joke made by biology students, the H is said to stand for "Haploid", the implication being that since by the doctrine of the Virgin birth Jesus had no biological father, his genome would have been inherited entirely from his mother, the Virgin Mary. For the scientific background of the joke see Ploidy.

== Variants ==
The number of variant forms, usually with "H" replaced by something longer, is vast. In addition to the folk etymology of Jesus Harold Christ, Smith lists Jesus Holy Christ, Jesus Hecking Christ, and Jesus H. Particular Christ. Green's Dictionary of Slang lists Jesus H!, Jesus H. Johnson!, Jesus H. Mahogany Christ!, Jesus Christ!, Christ!, Jesus J Christ!, and Judas H. Christ!.

For Smith, the very presence of so many spelled-out variants is part of the humor—and blasphemy—inherent in "Jesus H. Christ". He suggests that the H offers "the power of taking the Lord's name in vain by adding something to it that the imagination is invited to complete: What does the H. stand for? — whatever the errant imagination proposes and the imaginer is disposed to enjoy."

== Offensive status and blasphemy ==
The term is considered offensive by some, most notably within Christianity, where most denominations view Jesus as part of the Trinity and consubstantial with God. Thus, saying the name "Jesus (H.) Christ" can be taken as a form of contempt or disrespect for God and a form of blasphemy. More specifically, the interjection is considered by some to be a violation of the commandment, Thou shalt not take the name of the Lord thy God in vain.

== General and cited references ==
- Bolinger, Dwight (1986). Intonation and its parts: melody in spoken English. Stanford, CA: Stanford University Press. ISBN 978-0-8047-1241-5.
- Bottoms, Stephen J. (2000). Albee: Who's Afraid of Virginia Woolf?. Cambridge: Cambridge University Press.
- Cassidy, Frederick G. (1995). "More on Jesus H. Christ". American Speech. 70: 370.
- Draper, Mark (1993). "Alexander Campbell". In Hamric, Christie Graves (ed.). The Mark Twain Encyclopedia. Taylor & Francis.
- Falvey, Kate (2010). "Dark humor in Edward Albee's "Who's Afraid of Virginia Woolf?"". In Bloom, Harold; Hobby, Blake (eds.). Dark Humor. Infobase Publishing.
- Horberry, Roger (2010). Sounds good on paper: How to bring business language to life. A&C Black. ISBN 978-1-4081-2231-0.
- Lennox, Doug (2013). Now you know absolutely everything. Dundurn. ISBN 978-1-4597-2478-5.
- Quinion, Michael (2009). Why is Q Always Followed by U?: Word-Perfect Answers to the Most-Asked Questions About Language. Penguin UK.
- Ransom, Ian (2006). Waiting for the Rapture. iUniverse.
- Salinger, J. D. (1951). The Catcher in the Rye. New York: Little, Brown.
- Smith, Roger (1994). "The H of Jesus H. Christ". American Speech. 69 (3): 331–335. doi:10.2307/455527. JSTOR 455527.
