= Fundação Fernando Leite Couto =

Mozambican Nonprofit organisation

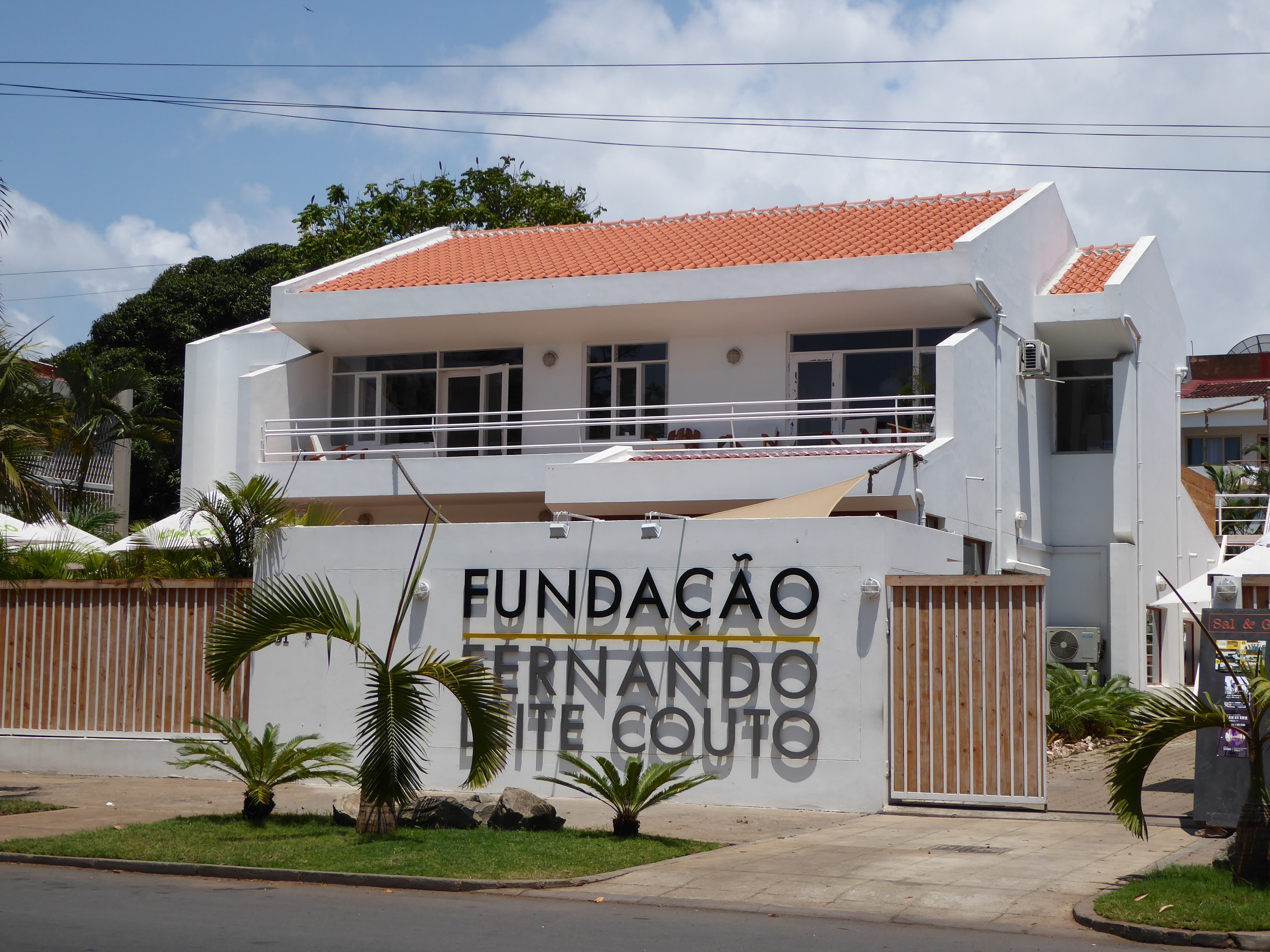
Fundação Fernando Leite Couto, at Avenida Kim Il Sung 961 in Maputo's Sommerschield neighbourhood

Fundação Fernando Leite Couto, Portuguese for "Foundation Fernando Leite Couto", is a foundation and cultural centre in Mozambique's capital Maputo. It was founded in 2015 and is named after the Portuguese-Mozambican writer Fernando Leite Counto. The foundation has its seat in a building developed by Pancho Guedes at Avenida Kim Il Sung 961 in the Sommerschield neighbourhood.

In 2015, Mia Couto, one of the most famous writers of Mozambique, founded the Fundação Fernando Leite Couto with the goal to promote the arts, culture and literature of Mozambique and to provide them a space in the Mozambique's capital. The foundation was inaugurated on April 15, 2015, by Fernando Leite Couto's three sons, Mia, Fernando Amado and Armando Jorge. The foundation has a large cultural program and is also planning to offer scholarships and awards to promote young Mozambican authors.

The foundation's building consists of a small library, a small café, and a space for events, especially concerts, readings and exhibitions. Many famous Mozambican artists, musicians and photographers have already shown their works at the foundation. Mia Couto presented his most recent new books there as well. In the meantime, Fundação Fernando Leite Couto has become one of the most important places for culture in Maputo.
