= Germani (surname) =

Germani is an Italian surname. Notable people with the surname include:

- Fernando Germani (1906–1998), Italian organist
- Gaia Germani (1942-2019), Italian film and television actress
- Remo Germani (1938–2010), Italian singer
