= Joshua Johnson =

Joshua Johnson or Josh Johnson may refer to:

== Sports ==
=== American football ===
- Josh Johnson (quarterback) (born 1986), American football quarterback
- Josh Johnson (cornerback) (born 1990), American football cornerback
- Josh Johnson (running back) (born 1997), American football running back

=== Baseball ===
- Josh Johnson (pitcher) (born 1984), Canadian-American baseball player in Major League Baseball
- Josh Johnson (catcher) (1914–1999), American baseball player in Negro league
- Josh Johnson (baseball coach) (born 1986), American baseball coach

=== Other sports ===
- Joshua Johnson (footballer, born 1884) (1884–?), English football goalkeeper
- Joshua Johnson (footballer, born 2004), English footballer
- Joshua J. Johnson (born 1976), American sprinter
- Josh Johnson (footballer, born 1981) (born 1981), Trinidadian football midfielder
- Josh Johnson (rugby league) (born 1994), English rugby league footballer
- Joshua Johnson (basketball) (born 1992), Ugandan basketball player
- Joshua Johnson (chess player) (born 1999), Trinidadian chess player
- Josh Johnson (born 1975), American javelin thrower, 1997 and 1998 All-American for the UCLA Bruins track and field team

== Other ==
- Joshua Caleb Johnson (born 2005), American child actor
- Joshua Johnson (painter) (1763–1832), American painter
- Joshua Johnson (journalist), American journalist and former host of the NPR program 1A
- Josh Johnson (comedian), American stand-up comedian and writer for The Daily Show
- Joshua Johnson, store owner involved in the Bricks & Minifigs–Reckless Ben controversy
