= Josh Morris =

Josh Morris may refer to:

- Josh Morris (footballer, born 1991), English footballer
- Josh Morris (Australian footballer) (born 2001), Australian rules footballer
- Josh Morris (politician) (born 1982), Australian politician
- Josh Morris (rugby league) (born 1986), Australian rugby league footballer
