= Yehoshua =

Yehoshua may refer to:

- Joshua (Hebrew Yehoshua), biblical figure, and the Book of Joshua (Hebrew: ספר יהושע Sefer Yĕhôshúa), a book of the Bible
- Yehoshua (surname), a Hebrew surname
- Yehoshua (given name), a list of people

== See also ==
- Jesus (name), the Greek translation of the Hebrew name, Iesous in the Septuagint.
- Joshua (name), a Hebrew given name
- Yeshua (Aramaic: יֵשׁוּעַ Yĕshúa), a shortened version of this name, found in Nehemiah 8:17
