= List of ministerial by-elections to the Parliament of Great Britain =

Ministerial by-elections to the Parliament of Great Britain at Westminster were held from 1707 to 1801, when a Member of Parliament (MP) was appointed as a minister in the government. Unlike most Westminster by-elections, ministerial by-elections were often a formality, uncontested by opposition parties. Re-election was required under the Succession to the Crown Act 1707. This was in line with the principle established in 1624 that accepting an office of profit from the Crown would precipitate resignation from the House, with the option of standing for re-election. Typically a minister sought re-election in the same constituency he had just vacated, but occasionally contested another seat which was also vacant. In 1910 The Times newspaper noted that the relevant Act had been passed in the reign of Queen Anne "to prevent the Court from swamping the House of Commons with placemen and pensioners", and described the process as "anomalous" and "indefensible" in the 20th century. The Re-Election of Ministers Act 1919 ended the necessity to seek re-election within nine months of a general election, and the Re-Election of Ministers Act (1919) Amendment Act 1926 ended the practice in all other cases.

== Elections ==
=== 18th Parliament (1796–1800) ===
Date	Constituency	c/u	Former incumbent	Winner	Position
13 December 1800	Wendover	u	John Hiley Addington	John Hiley Addington	Junior Lord of the Treasury
2 August 1800	Staffordshire	u	Lord Granville Leveson Gower	Lord Granville Leveson Gower	Junior Lord of the Treasury
28 July 1800	Buckingham	u	Thomas Grenville	Thomas Grenville	Chief Justice in Eyre South of Trent
5 July 1800	St Germans	u	William Eliot	William Eliot	Lord of the Admiralty
9 June 1800	Rye	u	Robert Saunders Dundas	Robert Saunders Dundas	Keeper of the Signet for Scotland
9 June 1800	Penryn	u	Thomas Wallace	Thomas Wallace	Commissioner of the Board of Control
7 June 1800	Tiverton	u	Dudley Ryder	Dudley Ryder	Treasurer of the Navy
5 June 1800	Wendover	u	George Canning	George Canning	Joint Paymaster of the Forces
2 June 1800	Edinburgh	u	Henry Dundas	Henry Dundas	Keeper of the Privy Seal of Scotland
5 April 1800	New Windsor	u	Robert Fulke Greville	Robert Fulke Greville	Groom of the Bedchamber
11 October 1799	Edinburghshire	u	Robert Dundas	Robert Dundas	Joint Clerk and Keeper of Sasines
2 August 1799	Banffshire	u	William Grant	Sir William Grant	Resignation pending appointment as Solicitor General for England and Wales
26 March 1799	Wendover	u	George Canning	George Canning	Commissioner of the Board of Control
19 March 1799	Flint Boroughs	u	Watkin Williams	Watkin Williams	Constable of Flint Castle
13 March 1799	Rye	u	Lord Hawkesbury	Lord Hawkesbury	Master of the Mint
10 December 1798	Banffshire	u	William Grant	William Grant	Chief Justice of Chester
6 December 1798	Downton	u	Sir William Scott	Sir William Scott	Judge of the Admiralty Court
2 December 1797	Tain Burghs	u	William Dundas	William Dundas	Commissioner of the Board of Control
10 November 1797	Chichester	u	Thomas Steele	Thomas Steele	King's Remembrancer
31 July 1797	Penryn	u	Thomas Wallace	Thomas Wallace	Lord of the Admiralty
27 July 1797	Dover	c	Charles Small Pybus	Charles Small Pybus	Junior Lord of the Treasury
25 July 1797	Newark-on-Trent	u	Thomas Manners Sutton	Thomas Manners Sutton	Chief Justice of the North Wales Circuit
8 May 1797	Scarborough	u	Lord Charles Henry Somerset	Lord Charles Henry Somerset	Comptroller of the Household
22 February 1797	Midhurst	u	Sylvester Douglas	Sylvester Douglas	Junior Lord of the Treasury
9 December 1796	Higham Ferrers	u	James Adair	James Adair	Chief Justice of Chester

=== 17th Parliament (1790–1796) ===
Date	Constituency	c/u	Former incumbent	Winner	Position
6 January 1796	Beaumaris	u	Sir Watkin Williams-Wynn	Sir Watkin Williams-Wynn	Steward of Bromfield and Yale
13 March 1795	Sandwich	u	Sir Philip Stephens	Sir Philip Stephens	Lord of the Admiralty
7 March 1795	Wendover	u	Lord Hugh Seymour	Lord Hugh Seymour	Lord of the Admiralty
7 February 1795	Leicester	u	Thomas Boothby Parkyns	Thomas Boothby Parkyns	Accepted a Commission in the Army
4 February 1795	Caernarvon Boroughs	u	Lord Paget	Lord Paget	Accepted a Commission in the Army
19 July 1794	Bishop's Castle	u	Henry Strachey	Henry Strachey	Master of the Household
15 July 1794	Honiton	u	Sir George Yonge	Sir George Yonge	Master of the Mint
12 July 1794	Norwich	c	William Windham	William Windham	Resignation pending appointment as Secretary at War
9 May 1794	Pontefract	u	John Smyth	John Smyth	Junior Lord of the Treasury
5 April 1794	Cambridge University	u	Earl of Euston	Earl of Euston	Chief Ranger of St. James Park and Hyde Park
29 January 1794	Seaford	c	John Sargent	Richard Paul Jodrell	Clerk of the Ordnance (Note: Sargent sought re-election at Queenborough)
5 August 1793	Cockermouth	u	John Anstruther	John Anstruther	Chief Justice of the North Wales Circuit
29 June 1793	Great Bedwyn	u	Viscount Stopford	Viscount Stopford	Treasurer of the Household
28 June 1793	Rye	u	Robert Banks Jenkinson	Robert Banks Jenkinson	Commissioner of the Board of Control
28 June 1793	Liskeard	u	Edward James Eliot	Edward James Eliot	Commissioner of the Board of Control
28 June 1793	Edinburgh	u	Henry Dundas	Henry Dundas	President of the Board of Control
26 June 1793	Whitchurch	u	John Thomas Townshend	John Thomas Townshend	Junior Lord of the Treasury
26 June 1793	Shaftesbury	u	William Grant	Paul Benfield	Second Justice of the South Wales Circuit (Note: Grant sought re-election at New Windsor)
20 February 1793	Weobley	u	Sir John Scott	Sir John Scott	Attorney General for England and Wales
20 February 1793	Bere Alston	u	John Mitford	Sir John Mitford	Solicitor General for England and Wales
8 February 1793	Lyme Regis	u	Thomas Fane	Thomas Fane	Groom of the Bedchamber
19 December 1792	Guildford	u	Thomas Onslow	Thomas Onslow	Out-Ranger of Windsor Forest
18 December 1792	Cambridge University	u	William Pitt the Younger	William Pitt the Younger	Lord Warden of the Cinque Ports
20 June 1791	Pontefract	u	John Smyth	John Smyth	Lord of the Admiralty
17 June 1791	Queenborough	u	Richard Hopkins	Richard Hopkins	Junior Lord of the Treasury
17 June 1791	Dover	u	Charles Small Pybus	Charles Small Pybus	Lord of the Admiralty
15 June 1791	Edinburgh	u	Henry Dundas	Henry Dundas	Home Secretary
6 May 1791	Dorset	u	William Morton Pitt	William Morton Pitt	Seeks re-election due to holding a contract to supply cordage
2 May 1791	Minehead	u	Viscount Parker	Viscount Parker	Comptroller of the Household
27 April 1791	Harwich	u	Thomas Orde	Thomas Orde	Governor of the Isle of Wight
12 March 1791	Poole	c	Benjamin Lester	Benjamin Lester	Seeks re-election due to holding an Admiralty contract
2 March 1791	Tiverton	u	Dudley Ryder	Dudley Ryder	Joint Paymaster of the Forces
28 February 1791	Chichester	c	Thomas Steele	Thomas Steele	Joint Paymaster of the Forces
22 December 1790	Warwick	u	The Lord Arden	The Lord Arden	Registrar of the Court of the Admiralty

=== 16th Parliament (1784–1790) ===
Date	Constituency	c/u	Former incumbent	Winner	Position
25 May 1790	Cirencester	u	Lord Apsley	Lord Apsley	Teller of the Receipt of the Exchequer
1 March 1790	Old Sarum	u	John Charles Villiers	John Charles Villiers	Chief Justice in Eyre North of Trent
26 February 1790	Tiverton	u	Dudley Ryder	Dudley Ryder	Comptroller of the Household
24 August 1789	East Looe	u	Viscount Belgrave	Viscount Belgrave	Resignation pending appointment as a Lord of the Admiralty
10 August 1789	Great Bedwyn	u	Marquess of Graham	Marquess of Graham	Joint Paymaster of the Forces
7 August 1789	Cirencester	u	Lord Apsley	Lord Apsley	Junior Lord of the Treasury
7 August 1789	Bath	u	Viscount Bayham	Viscount Bayham	Junior Lord of the Treasury
29 July 1789	Bere Alston	u	John Mitford	John Mitford	Justice of Cardiganshire, Pembrokeshire and Carmarthenshire
19 June 1789	Buckinghamshire	u	William Wyndham Grenville	William Wyndham Grenville	Home Secretary
11 May 1789	Cambridge	u	James Whorwood Adeane	Edward Finch	Groom of the Bedchamber (Note: Adeane sought re-election at Cambridgeshire)
8 April 1789	Gloucestershire	u	George Cranfield Berkeley	George Cranfield Berkeley	Surveyor-General of the Ordnance
4 August 1788	Westminster	c	The Lord Hood	Lord John Townshend	Naval Lord
12 July 1788	Hindon	u	Edward Bearcroft	Edward Bearcroft	Chief Justice of Chester
9 July 1788	New Woodstock	u	Francis Burton	Francis Burton	Second Justice of Chester
7 July 1788	Weobley	u	Sir John Scott	Sir John Scott	Solicitor General for England and Wales
4 July 1788	Newcastle-under-Lyme	u	Archibald Macdonald	Sir Archibald Macdonald	Attorney General for England and Wales
1 July 1788	New Windsor	u	Peniston Portlock Powney	Peniston Portlock Powney	Ranger of Windsor Little Park
25 June 1788	Aldborough	u	Richard Pepper Arden	Richard Pepper Arden	Master of the Rolls
18 June 1788	Launceston	u	George Rose	Sir John Swinburne	Clerk of the Parliaments (Note: Rose sought re-election at Lymington)
26 December 1787	Harwich	u	John Robinson	John Robinson	Surveyor General of Woods, Forests, Parks, and Chases
4 December 1787	Old Sarum	u	George Hardinge	George Hardinge	Chief Justice of Breconshire
17 July 1787	Argyllshire	u	Lord Frederick Campbell	Lord Frederick Campbell	Resignation pending appointment as Vice-Treasurer of Ireland
23 February 1787	Old Sarum	u	John Charles Villiers	John Charles Villiers	Comptroller of the Household
1 February 1787	Bere Alston	u	The Earl of Mornington	Charles Rainsford	Junior Lord of the Treasury (Note: Mornington sought re-election at Saltash)
6 February 1786	Liskeard	u	Edward James Eliot	Edward James Eliot	King's Remembrancer
12 May 1785	Dumfriesshire	u	Sir Robert Laurie	Sir Robert Laurie	Knight Marischal
22 February 1785	Morpeth	u	Sir James St Clair Erskine	Sir James St Clair Erskine	Accepts a beneficial interest in the Office of Director of Chancery in Scotland
31 August 1784	Marlborough	u	The Earl of Courtown	The Earl of Courtown	Treasurer of the Household
28 August 1784	Chipping Wycombe	u	Robert Waller	Robert Waller	Groom of the Bedchamber

=== 15th Parliament (1780–1784) ===
Date	Constituency	c/u	Former incumbent	Winner	Position
8 January 1784	Edinburghshire	u	Henry Dundas	Henry Dundas	Treasurer of the Navy
6 January 1784	Newtown	u	Richard Pepper Arden	Richard Pepper Arden	Solicitor General for England and Wales
5 January 1784	Richmond	u	Marquess of Graham	Marquess of Graham	Junior Lord of the Treasury
5 January 1784	Buckingham	u	William Wyndham Grenville	William Wyndham Grenville	Paymaster of the Forces
5 January 1784	Bath	u	John Jeffreys Pratt	John Jeffreys Pratt	Lord of the Admiralty
3 January 1784	Westbury	u	Samuel Estwick	Samuel Estwick	Secretary and Registrar of Chelsea Hospital
3 January 1784	St Germans	u	Edward James Eliot	Edward James Eliot	Junior Lord of the Treasury
3 January 1784	Ludgershall	u	George Augustus Selwyn	George Augustus Selwyn	Surveyor General of the Land Revenues of the Crown
3 January 1784	East Looe	u	John Buller	John Buller	Junior Lord of the Treasury
3 January 1784	Launceston	u	Charles George Perceval	Charles George Perceval	Lord of the Admiralty
3 January 1784	Appleby	u	William Pitt the Younger	William Pitt the Younger	First Lord of the Treasury and Chancellor of the Exchequer
31 December 1783	Hindon	c	Lloyd Kenyon	Lloyd Kenyon	Attorney General for England and Wales
31 December 1783	Dartmouth	u	Charles Brett	Charles Brett	Lord of the Admiralty
31 December 1783	Cirencester	u	Lord Apsley	Lord Apsley	Lord of the Admiralty
30 December 1783	Wallingford	u	John Aubrey	John Aubrey	Junior Lord of the Treasury
30 December 1783	Honiton	u	Sir George Yonge	Sir George Yonge	Secretary at War
26 November 1783	Clitheroe	u	John Lee	John Lee	Attorney General for England and Wales
26 November 1783	Cambridge University	u	James Mansfield	James Mansfield	Solicitor General for England and Wales
7 August 1783	Dunbartonshire	u	George Keith Elphinstone	George Keith Elphinstone	Secretary, Chamberlain and Keeper of the Signet of the Principality of Scotland
30 May 1783	Newton	u	Thomas Peter Legh	Thomas Peter Legh	Accepted a Commission in the Army
24 May 1783	Huntingdonshire	u	Viscount Hinchingbrooke	Viscount Hinchingbrooke	Master of the Buckhounds
9 May 1783	Wigtown Burghs	u	William Adam	William Adam	Treasurer of the Ordnance
2 May 1783	Wigan	u	Horatio Walpole	Horatio Walpole	Secretary and Registrar of Chelsea Hospital
29 April 1783	Tamworth	u	John Courtenay	John Courtenay	Surveyor-General of the Ordnance
25 April 1783	Okehampton	u	Humphrey Minchin	Humphrey Minchin	Clerk of the Ordnance
23 April 1783	Clitheroe	u	John Lee	John Lee	Solicitor General for England and Wales
22 April 1783	Horsham	u	James Wallace	James Wallace	Attorney General for England and Wales
18 April 1783	Tavistock	u	Richard FitzPatrick	Richard FitzPatrick	Secretary at War
17 April 1783	Bishop's Castle	u	Henry Strachey	Henry Strachey	Clerk of the Deliveries of the Ordnance
16 April 1783	Montgomery	u	Whitshed Keene	Whitshed Keene	Lord of the Admiralty
16 April 1783	Petersfield	u	William Jolliffe	William Jolliffe	Lord of the Admiralty
15 April 1783	Warwick	u	Charles Francis Greville	Charles Francis Greville	Treasurer of the Household
15 April 1783	Knaresborough	u	Viscount Duncannon	Viscount Duncannon	Lord of the Admiralty
14 April 1783	Carlisle	u	Earl of Surrey	Earl of Surrey	Junior Lord of the Treasury
12 April 1783	Saltash	c	Sir Grey Cooper	Sir Grey Cooper	Junior Lord of the Treasury
11 April 1783	Malton	u	Edmund Burke	Edmund Burke	Paymaster of the Forces
11 April 1783	Cambridge University	u	John Townshend	John Townshend	Lord of the Admiralty
10 April 1783	Higham Ferrers	u	Frederick Montagu	Frederick Montagu	Junior Lord of the Treasury
9 April 1783	Great Yarmouth	u	Charles Townshend	Charles Townshend	Treasurer of the Navy
9 April 1783	New Woodstock	u	William Eden	William Eden	Vice-Treasurer of Ireland
9 April 1783	Banbury	u	Lord North	Lord North	Home Secretary
8 April 1783	York	u	Lord John Cavendish	Lord John Cavendish	Chancellor of the Exchequer
7 April 1783	Westminster	u	Charles James Fox	Charles James Fox	Foreign Secretary
29 March 1783	Westbury	u	Samuel Estwick	Samuel Estwick	Secretary and Registrar of Chelsea Hospital
2 January 1783	Edinburghshire	u	Henry Dundas	Henry Dundas	Treasurer of the Navy (Note: Dundas sought re-election at Newtown to ensure that he had a seat when Parliament convened. Afterwards he resigned that seat and was returned for Edinburghshire.)
18 December 1782	Oxfordshire	u	Lord Charles Spencer	Lord Charles Spencer	Vice-Treasurer of Ireland
5 August 1782	Appleby	u	William Pitt the Younger	William Pitt the Younger	Chancellor of the Exchequer
22 July 1782	St Germans	u	Edward James Eliot	Edward James Eliot	Junior Lord of the Treasury
19 July 1782	Calne	u	Isaac Barré	Isaac Barré	Paymaster of the Forces
19 July 1782	Bath	u	John Jeffreys Pratt	John Jeffreys Pratt	Lord of the Admiralty
18 July 1782	Whitchurch	u	Thomas Townshend	Thomas Townshend	Home Secretary
16 July 1782	Honiton	u	Sir George Yonge	Sir George Yonge	Secretary at War
15 July 1782	Wallingford	u	John Aubrey	John Aubrey	Lord of the Admiralty
8 July 1782	New Romney	u	Richard Jackson	Richard Jackson	Junior Lord of the Treasury
3 June 1782	Oxford	u	Lord Robert Spencer	Lord Robert Spencer	Vice-Treasurer of Ireland
4 May 1782	Huntingdonshire	u	The Earl Ludlow	The Earl Ludlow	Comptroller of the Household
25 April 1782	Sussex	u	Thomas Pelham	Thomas Pelham	Surveyor-General of the Ordnance
25 April 1782	Elginshire	u	Lord William Gordon	Lord William Gordon	Vice Admiral of Scotland
22 April 1782	Hindon	c	Lloyd Kenyon	Lloyd Kenyon	Attorney General for England and Wales
6 April 1782	Thetford	u	Richard Hopkins	Richard Hopkins	Lord of the Admiralty
5 April 1782	Calne	u	Isaac Barré	Isaac Barré	Treasurer of the Navy
4 April 1782	Malton	u	Edmund Burke	Edmund Burke	Paymaster of the Forces
4 April 1782	Knaresborough	u	Viscount Duncannon	Viscount Duncannon	Lord of the Admiralty
4 April 1782	Higham Ferrers	u	Frederick Montagu	Frederick Montagu	Junior Lord of the Treasury
4 April 1782	Buckingham	u	James Grenville	James Grenville	Junior Lord of the Treasury
4 April 1782	Bridgnorth	u	Hugh Pigot	Hugh Pigot	Naval Lord
3 April 1782	York	u	Lord John Cavendish	Lord John Cavendish	Chancellor of the Exchequer
3 April 1782	Whitchurch	u	Thomas Townshend	Thomas Townshend	Secretary at War
3 April 1782	Westminster	u	Charles James Fox	Charles James Fox	Foreign Secretary
3 April 1782	Northampton	u	Viscount Althorp	Viscount Althorp	Junior Lord of the Treasury
3 April 1782	Cambridge University	u	John Townshend	John Townshend	Lord of the Admiralty
2 April 1782	Honiton	u	Sir George Yonge	Sir George Yonge	Vice-Treasurer of Ireland
19 February 1782	Buckingham	u	Richard Aldworth Neville	William Wyndham Grenville	Agent to the Regiment of Militia in Buckinghamshire (Note: Neville sought re-election at Reading)
18 February 1782	Weymouth and Melcombe Regis	u	Welbore Ellis	Welbore Ellis	Secretary of State for the Colonies
2 January 1782	Castle Rising	u	John Chetwynd Talbot	John Chetwynd Talbot	Lord of Trade
24 August 1781	Lanarkshire	u	Andrew Stuart	Andrew Stuart	Seeks re-election upon becoming Keeper of the Register of Sasines in Scotland
16 August 1781	Ayrshire	u	Sir Adam Fergusson	Sir Adam Fergusson	Lord of Trade
26 July 1781	Morpeth	u	Anthony Morris Storer	Anthony Morris Storer	Lord of Trade
16 July 1781	Caernarvon Boroughs	u	Glyn Wynn	Glyn Wynn	Receiver General of Land Revenue in North Wales and Cheshire
26 June 1781	Radnorshire	u	Thomas Johnes	Thomas Johnes	Auditor of the King's Land Revenue in Wales

=== 14th Parliament (1774–1780) ===
Date	Constituency	c/u	Former incumbent	Winner	Position
12 July 1780	Horsham	u	James Wallace	James Wallace	Attorney General for England and Wales
5 February 1780	Orford	u	Viscount Beauchamp	Viscount Beauchamp	Cofferer of the Household
1 February 1780	Newport (I.o.W.)	u	Sir Richard Worsley	Sir Richard Worsley	Comptroller of the Household
22 December 1779	Oxfordshire	u	Lord Charles Spencer	Lord Charles Spencer	Treasurer of the Chamber
23 July 1779	Lanarkshire	u	Andrew Stuart	Andrew Stuart	Lord of Trade
16 July 1779	Linlithgowshire	u	Sir William Cunynghame	Sir William Cunynghame	Third Clerk Comptroller of the Green Cloth
16 July 1779	Edinburghshire	u	Henry Dundas	Henry Dundas	Keeper of the Signet
12 July 1779	Truro	u	Bamber Gascoyne	Bamber Gascoyne	Lord of the Admiralty
12 July 1779	Liskeard	u	Edward Gibbon	Edward Gibbon	Lord of Trade
1 January 1779	Montgomery	u	Whitshed Keene	Whitshed Keene	Surveyor of the King's Works
22 December 1778	Hastings	u	Charles Jenkinson	Charles Jenkinson	Secretary at War
15 June 1778	Bishop's Castle	u	Henry Strachey	Alexander Wedderburn	Clerk of the Deliveries of the Ordnance (Note: Strachey sought re-election at Saltash.)
11 June 1778	Okehampton	u	Alexander Wedderburn	Humphrey Minchin	Attorney General for England and Wales
10 June 1778	Horsham	u	James Wallace	James Wallace	Solicitor General for England and Wales
9 June 1778	Banbury	u	Lord North	Lord North	Lord Warden of the Cinque Ports
3 June 1778	St Germans	u	Benjamin Langlois	Benjamin Langlois	Storekeeper of the Ordnance
27 May 1778	Lostwithiel	u	Thomas Potter	Thomas Potter	Second Justice of Anglesey
17 December 1777	Newport (I.o.W.)	u	Sir Richard Worsley	Sir Richard Worsley	Third Clerk Comptroller of the Green Cloth
17 December 1777	Hastings	u	The Viscount Palmerston	The Viscount Palmerston	Junior Lord of the Treasury
15 December 1777	Huntingdon	u	The Lord Mulgrave	The Lord Mulgrave	Lord of the Admiralty
1 December 1777	Midhurst	u	John Ord	John Ord	Attorney-General of the Duchy of Lancaster
29 November 1777	Bath	u	Abel Moysey	Abel Moysey	Second Justice of Brecon Circuit
18 June 1777	Bewdley	u	The Lord Westcote	The Lord Westcote	Junior Lord of the Treasury
16 June 1777	Camelford	u	Sir Ralph Payne	Sir Ralph Payne	Third Clerk Comptroller of the Green Cloth
14 June 1777	Wilton	u	Charles Herbert	Charles Herbert	Groom of the Bedchamber
13 June 1777	Weymouth and Melcombe Regis	u	Welbore Ellis	Welbore Ellis	Treasurer of the Navy
13 June 1777	Tamworth	u	Thomas de Grey	Thomas de Grey	Lord of Trade
11 June 1777	Great Yarmouth	c	Charles Townshend	Charles Townshend	Vice-Treasurer of Ireland
27 March 1777	Lanarkshire	u	Andrew Stuart	Andrew Stuart	Joint Keeper of the Signet
14 March 1777	Edinburghshire	u	Henry Dundas	Henry Dundas	Joint Keeper of the Signet
6 November 1776	Southampton	u	Hans Stanley	Hans Stanley	Cofferer of the Household
29 May 1776	Wareham	u	Christopher D'Oyly	Christopher D'Oyly	Commissary General of Musters
11 March 1776	New Woodstock	u	William Eden	William Eden	Lord of Trade
29 November 1775	Eye	u	John St John	John St John	Surveyor General of the Land Revenues of the Crown
15 November 1775	East Grinstead	u	Lord George Germain	Lord George Germain	Secretary of State for the Colonies
8 November 1775	Malmesbury	u	Charles James Fox	Charles James Fox	Seeks re-election upon inheriting and then resigning the office of Clerk of the Pells in Ireland
3 November 1775	Hastings	u	Charles Jenkinson	Charles Jenkinson	Clerk of the Pells in Ireland
8 June 1775	Edinburghshire	u	Henry Dundas	Henry Dundas	Lord Advocate
12 April 1775	Scarborough	u	Sir Hugh Palliser	Sir Hugh Palliser	Naval Lord
5 April 1775	Heytesbury	u	William Gordon	William Gordon	Groom of the Bedchamber
28 December 1774	Winchester	u	Henry Penton	Henry Penton	Lord of the Admiralty

=== 13th Parliament (1768–1774) ===
Date	Constituency	c/u	Former incumbent	Winner	Position
21 March 1774	Grampound	u	Charles Wolfran Cornwall	Charles Wolfran Cornwall	Junior Lord of the Treasury
19 March 1774	Liverpool	u	Sir William Meredith	Sir William Meredith	Comptroller of the Household
15 March 1774	Orford	u	Viscount Beauchamp	Viscount Beauchamp	Junior Lord of the Treasury
14 March 1774	Weymouth and Melcombe Regis	u	Jeremiah Dyson	Jeremiah Dyson	Cofferer of the Household
28 January 1774	Wareham	u	Whitshed Keene	Thomas de Grey	Lord of Trade (Note: Keene sought re-election at Ludgershall.)
20 January 1774	Newcastle-under-Lyme	u	Sir George Hay	Sir George Hay	Judge of the High Court of the Admiralty
1 January 1773	Midhurst	u	Charles James Fox	Charles James Fox	Junior Lord of the Treasury
28 December 1772	Harwich	u	Charles Jenkinson	Charles Jenkinson	Vice-Treasurer of Ireland
5 December 1772	St Germans	u	Benjamin Langlois	Benjamin Langlois	Clerk of the Deliveries of the Ordnance
5 December 1772	Ludgershall	u	Viscount Garlies	Viscount Garlies	Lord of Trade
4 December 1772	Reigate	u	Sir Charles Cocks	Sir Charles Cocks	Clerk of the Ordnance
15 June 1772	Lyme Regis	u	Henry Fane	Henry Fane	Surveyor of the King's Private Roads
9 May 1772	Saltash	c	Thomas Bradshaw	John Williams	Lord of the Admiralty
9 May 1772	Saltash	c	John Williams	Thomas Bradshaw	By-election results reversed on petition 8 June 1772
10 April 1772	New Woodstock	u	John Skynner	John Skynner	Puisne Justice of Chester
28 February 1772	Dysart Burghs	u	James Townsend Oswald	James Townsend Oswald	Secretary for the Leeward Islands
15 February 1772	Petersfield	u	William Jolliffe	William Jolliffe	Lord of Trade
12 February 1772	Weobley	u	Bamber Gascoyne	Bamber Gascoyne	Lord of Trade
3 February 1772	Castle Rising	u	Thomas Whately	Thomas Whately	Surveyor of the King's Private Roads
27 January 1772	Wallingford	c	Robert Pigot	John Cator	Warden of the Mint
11 May 1771	Wootton Bassett	u	Henry St John	Henry St John	Groom of the Bedchamber
27 February 1771	Haddington Burghs	c	Patrick Warrender	Patrick Warrender	King's Remembrancer in Scotland
16 February 1771	Huntingdonshire	u	Viscount Hinchingbrooke	Viscount Hinchingbrooke	Vice-Chamberlain of the Household
2 February 1771	Castle Rising	u	Thomas Whately	Thomas Whately	Lord of Trade
1 February 1771	Tamworth	u	Edward Thurlow	Edward Thurlow	Attorney General for England and Wales
1 February 1771	Bishop's Castle	u	Alexander Wedderburn	Alexander Wedderburn	Solicitor General for England and Wales
29 January 1771	Bury St Edmunds	u	Augustus John Hervey	Augustus John Hervey	Naval Lord
23 May 1770	Bossiney	u	Sir George Osborn	Sir George Osborn	Groom of the Bedchamber
21 May 1770	Southampton	u	Hans Stanley	Hans Stanley	Governor of the Isle of Wight
30 April 1770	New Woodstock	u	Lord Robert Spencer	Lord Robert Spencer	Lord of Trade
23 April 1770	Carmarthenshire	u	George Rice	George Rice	Treasurer of the Chamber
20 April 1770	Warwick	u	Lord Greville	Lord Greville	Lord of Trade
17 April 1770	Great Bedwyn	u	William Northey	William Northey	Lord of Trade
4 April 1770	Tamworth	u	Edward Thurlow	Edward Thurlow	Solicitor General for England and Wales
22 March 1770	Roxburghshire	u	Sir Gilbert Elliot	Sir Gilbert Elliot	Treasurer of the Navy
7 March 1770	Cardiganshire	u	The Viscount Lisburne	The Viscount Lisburne	Lord of the Admiralty
1 March 1770	Christchurch	u	Thomas Robinson	Thomas Robinson	Vice-Chamberlain of the Household
27 February 1770	Plymouth	u	Francis Holburne	Francis Holburne	Naval Lord
26 February 1770	Midhurst	u	Charles James Fox	Charles James Fox	Lord of the Admiralty
10 February 1770	Great Yarmouth	u	Charles Townshend	Charles Townshend	Junior Lord of the Treasury
8 February 1770	Petersfield	u	Welbore Ellis	Welbore Ellis	Vice-Treasurer of Ireland
9 June 1769	Stirling Burghs	u	James Masterton	James Masterton	Barrack Master General for Scotland
15 May 1769	Cambridge	u	Charles Sloane Cadogan	Charles Sloane Cadogan	Master of the Mint
8 May 1769	Totnes	u	Peter Burrell	Peter Burrell	Surveyor General of the Land Revenues of the Crown
8 February 1769	Guildford	u	Sir Fletcher Norton	Sir Fletcher Norton	Justice in Eyre, South of the Trent
4 January 1769	Cardiganshire	u	The Viscount Lisburne	The Viscount Lisburne	Lord of Trade
28 December 1768	Weymouth and Melcombe Regis	u	Jeremiah Dyson	Jeremiah Dyson	Junior Lord of the Treasury
10 December 1768	Glasgow Burghs	u	Lord Frederick Campbell	Lord Frederick Campbell	Lord Clerk Register
11 July 1768	Tavistock	u	Richard Rigby	Richard Rigby	Paymaster of the Forces
2 July 1768	Ludgershall	u	Viscount Garlies	Viscount Garlies	Commissioner of Police for Scotland
27 June 1768	Bristol	u	The Viscount Clare	The Viscount Clare	Vice-Treasurer of Ireland

=== 12th Parliament (1761–1768) ===
Date	Constituency	c/u	Former incumbent	Winner	Position
28 January 1768	Tavistock	u	Richard Rigby	Richard Rigby	Vice-Treasurer of Ireland
4 December 1767	Whitchurch	u	Thomas Townshend	Thomas Townshend	Joint Paymaster of the Forces
4 December 1767	Appleby	u	Charles Jenkinson	Charles Jenkinson	Junior Lord of the Treasury
1 December 1767	Dartmouth	u	Richard Hopkins	Richard Hopkins	Third Clerk Comptroller of the Green Cloth
30 November 1767	Banbury	u	Lord North	Lord North	Chancellor of the Exchequer
5 February 1767	Roxburghshire	u	Sir Gilbert Elliot	Gilbert Elliot	Keeper of the Signet
9 January 1767	Cockermouth	u	Charles Jenkinson	John Elliot	Lord of the Admiralty (Note: Jenkinson sought re-election at Appleby.)
16 December 1766	Bristol	u	Robert Nugent	Robert Nugent	First Lord of Trade
15 December 1766	Southampton	u	Hans Stanley	Hans Stanley	Cofferer of the Household
10 December 1766	Portsmouth	u	Sir Edward Hawke	Sir Edward Hawke	First Lord of the Admiralty
9 December 1766	Queenborough	u	Sir Peircy Brett	Sir Peircy Brett	Naval Lord
5 December 1766	Ross-shire	u	James Stuart Mackenzie	James Stuart Mackenzie	Keeper of the Privy Seal of Scotland
4 December 1766	Nairnshire	u	Pryse Campbell	Pryse Campbell	Junior Lord of the Treasury
27 November 1766	Middlesex	u	George Cooke	George Cooke	Joint Paymaster of the Forces
25 November 1766	East Retford	u	John Shelley	John Shelley	Treasurer of the Household
20 November 1766	East Looe	u	The Viscount Palmerston	The Viscount Palmerston	Lord of the Admiralty
18 November 1766	Buckingham	u	James Grenville	James Grenville	Vice-Treasurer of Ireland
18 November 1766	Christchurch	u	Thomas Robinson	Thomas Robinson	Lord of Trade
18 November 1766	Newport (Cornwall)	u	William de Grey	William de Grey	Attorney General for England and Wales
18 November 1766	Chipping Wycombe	u	Isaac Barré	Isaac Barré	Vice-Treasurer of Ireland
17 November 1766	Banbury	u	Lord North	Lord North	Joint Paymaster of the Forces
17 November 1766	Harwich	u	Charles Townshend	Charles Townshend	Chancellor of the Exchequer
17 November 1766	Honiton	u	Sir George Yonge	Sir George Yonge	Lord of the Admiralty
1 April 1766	Bridgnorth	u	William Whitmore	William Whitmore	Warden of the Mint
17 January 1766	Perth Burghs	u	George Dempster	George Dempster	Secretary to the Order of the Thistle
8 January 1766	Worcestershire	u	William Dowdeswell	William Dowdeswell	Chancellor of the Exchequer
8 January 1766	Surrey	u	George Onslow	George Onslow	Junior Lord of the Treasury
2 January 1766	Edinburghshire	u	Sir Alexander Gilmour	Sir Alexander Gilmour	Third Clerk Comptroller of the Green Cloth
30 December 1765	Knaresborough	u	Sir Anthony Thomas Abdy	Sir Anthony Thomas Abdy	King's Counsel
30 December 1765	Knaresborough	u	Lord John Cavendish	Lord John Cavendish	Junior Lord of the Treasury
28 December 1765	Higham Ferrers	u	John Yorke	John Yorke	Lord of Trade
27 December 1765	East Looe	u	The Viscount Palmerston	The Viscount Palmerston	Lord of Trade
27 December 1765	East Looe	u	John Buller	John Buller	Lord of the Admiralty
27 December 1765	Guildford	u	George Onslow	George Onslow	Out-Ranger of Windsor Forest
26 December 1765	Dartmouth	u	The Viscount Howe	The Viscount Howe	Treasurer of the Navy
26 December 1765	Derby	u	William Fitzherbert	William Fitzherbert	Lord of Trade
26 December 1765	Hedon	u	Sir Charles Saunders	Sir Charles Saunders	Naval Lord
26 December 1765	Hythe	u	Lord George Sackville	Lord George Sackville	Vice-Treasurer of Ireland
26 December 1765	Liverpool	u	Sir William Meredith	Sir William Meredith	Lord of the Admiralty
26 December 1765	Plymouth	u	The Viscount Barrington	The Viscount Barrington	Secretary at War
26 December 1765	Pontefract	u	The Viscount Galway	The Viscount Galway	Master of the Staghounds
26 December 1765	Stamford	u	George Bridges Brudenell	George Bridges Brudenell	Second Clerk Comptroller of the Green Cloth
26 December 1765	Sussex	u	Thomas Pelham	Thomas Pelham	Comptroller of the Household
23 December 1765	Harwich	u	John Roberts	John Roberts	Lord of Trade
23 December 1765	Reigate	u	Charles Yorke	Charles Yorke	Attorney General for England and Wales
23 December 1765	Seaford	u	The Viscount Gage	The Viscount Gage	Paymaster of Pensions
23 December 1765	Tamworth	u	Viscount Villiers	Edward Thurlow	Vice-Chamberlain of the Household (Note: Villiers sought re-election at Aldborough.)
23 December 1765	Thetford	u	Henry Seymour Conway	Henry Seymour Conway	Southern Secretary
23 December 1765	Whitchurch	u	Thomas Townshend	Thomas Townshend	Junior Lord of the Treasury
23 December 1765	New Windsor	u	Augustus Keppel	Augustus Keppel	Naval Lord
23 December 1765	Great Yarmouth	u	Charles Townshend	Charles Townshend	Lord of the Admiralty
24 June 1765	Glasgow Burghs	u	Lord Frederick Campbell	Lord Frederick Campbell	Keeper of the Privy Seal of Scotland
5 June 1765	Anstruther Burghs	u	Sir Henry Erskine	Sir Henry Erskine	Secretary to the Order of the Thistle
3 June 1765	Harwich	u	Charles Townshend	Charles Townshend	Paymaster of the Forces
19 January 1765	Bossiney	u	John Richmond Webb	John Richmond Webb	Judge of the Brecon Circuit
18 January 1765	Wilton	u	Nicholas Herbert	Nicholas Herbert	Secretary of Jamaica
17 January 1765	Brackley	u	Robert Wood	Robert Wood	Groom Porter
15 January 1765	Southampton	u	Hans Stanley	Hans Stanley	Governor of the Isle of Wight
15 January 1765	Winchelsea	u	Sir Thomas Sewell	Sir Thomas Sewell	Master of the Rolls
23 April 1764	Cambridge	u	Charles Sloane Cadogan	Charles Sloane Cadogan	Surveyor of Gardens and Waters
24 April 1764	Bedford	u	Richard Vernon	Richard Vernon	Third Clerk Comptroller of the Green Cloth
24 April 1764	Yarmouth	u	Jeremiah Dyson	Jeremiah Dyson	Lord of Trade
29 December 1763	Stirlingshire	u	James Campbell	James Campbell	Governor of Stirling Castle
27 December 1763	Newport (Cornwall)	u	William de Grey	William de Grey	Solicitor General for England and Wales
24 December 1763	Wigan	c	Sir Fletcher Norton	Sir Fletcher Norton	Attorney General for England and Wales
24 December 1763	West Looe	u	Francis Buller	Francis Buller	Groom Porter
22 November 1763	Tavistock	u	Richard Neville Neville	Richard Neville Neville	Paymaster of Pensions
18 May 1763	Dysart Burghs	u	James Oswald	James Oswald	Vice-Treasurer of Ireland
12 May 1763	Ross-shire	u	James Stuart Mackenzie	James Stuart Mackenzie	Keeper of the Privy Seal of Scotland
11 May 1763	Glamorganshire	u	Sir Edmond Thomas	Sir Edmond Thomas	Surveyor-General of Woods North and South of Trent
6 May 1763	Kirkcudbright Stewartry	u	John Ross Mackye	John Ross Mackye	Treasurer of the Ordnance
4 May 1763	Oxfordshire	u	Lord Charles Spencer	Lord Charles Spencer	Comptroller of the Household
28 April 1763	St Ives	u	Charles Hotham	Charles Hotham	Groom of the Bedchamber
28 April 1763	Dartmouth	u	The Viscount Howe	The Viscount Howe	Naval Lord
27 April 1763	Pontefract	u	William Gerard Hamilton	William Gerard Hamilton	Chancellor of the Exchequer of Ireland
26 April 1763	Old Sarum	u	Thomas Pitt	Thomas Pitt	Lord of the Admiralty
26 April 1763	Maldon	c	Bamber Gascoyne	John Huske	Lord of Trade
25 April 1763	Buckingham	u	George Grenville	George Grenville	First Lord of the Treasury and Chancellor of the Exchequer
23 April 1763	Winchelsea	u	Thomas Orby Hunter	Thomas Orby Hunter	Junior Lord of the Treasury
23 April 1763	Wells	u	The Lord Digby	The Lord Digby	Lord of the Admiralty
23 April 1763	Christchurch	u	James Harris	James Harris	Junior Lord of the Treasury
21 April 1763	Yarmouth	u	The Lord Holmes	The Lord Holmes	Governor of the Isle of Wight
1 March 1763	Harwich	u	Charles Townshend	Charles Townshend	First Lord of Trade
12 January 1763	Oxfordshire	u	Lord Charles Spencer	Lord Charles Spencer	Out-Ranger of Windsor Forest and Surveyor of Gardens and Waters
3 January 1763	Launceston	u	Humphry Morice	Humphry Morice	Comptroller of the Household
1 January 1763	Huntingdonshire	u	The Lord Carysfort	The Lord Carysfort	Lord of the Admiralty
28 December 1762	Christchurch	u	James Harris	James Harris	Lord of the Admiralty
27 December 1762	Weobley	u	Henry Frederick Thynne	Henry Frederick Thynne	Third Clerk Comptroller of the Green Cloth
27 December 1762	Ipswich	u	The Lord Orwell	The Lord Orwell	Lord of Trade
27 December 1762	Bewdley	u	Sir Edward Winnington	Sir Edward Winnington	Storekeeper of the Ordnance
23 December 1762	Tavistock	u	Richard Rigby	Richard Rigby	Vice-Treasurer of Ireland
22 December 1762	Aylesbury	u	Welbore Ellis	Welbore Ellis	Secretary at War
21 December 1762	Lancashire	u	Lord Strange	Lord Strange	Chancellor of the Duchy of Lancaster
15 December 1762	Abingdon	u	John Morton	John Morton	Chief Justice of Chester
30 November 1762	Dunwich	u	Henry Fox	Henry Fox	Clerk of the Pells in Ireland
30 November 1762	Buckingham	u	George Grenville	George Grenville	First Lord of the Admiralty
30 June 1762	Cockermouth	u	Charles Jenkinson	Charles Jenkinson	Treasurer of the Ordnance
17 June 1762	Selkirkshire	u	Gilbert Elliot	Gilbert Elliot	Treasurer of the Chamber
11 June 1762	Plymouth	u	The Viscount Barrington	The Viscount Barrington	Treasurer of the Navy
9 June 1762	Weymouth and Melcombe Regis	u	Sir Francis Dashwood	Sir Francis Dashwood	Chancellor of the Exchequer
9 June 1762	King's Lynn	u	Sir John Turner	Sir John Turner	Junior Lord of the Treasury
7 June 1762	Buckingham	u	George Grenville	George Grenville	Northern Secretary
24 February 1762	Hampshire	u	Sir Simeon Stuart	Sir Simeon Stuart	Chamberlain of the Exchequer
1 February 1762	Reigate	u	Charles Yorke	Charles Yorke	Attorney General for England and Wales
1 February 1762	Wigan	u	Fletcher Norton	Sir Fletcher Norton	Solicitor General for England and Wales
10 December 1761	Derbyshire	u	Lord George Cavendish	Lord George Cavendish	Comptroller of the Household
7 December 1761	Minehead	u	The Earl of Thomond	The Earl of Thomond	Cofferer of the Household (Note: Thormond was elected in two constituencies and sought re-election at Minehead.)
5 December 1761	Harwich	u	John Roberts	John Roberts	Lord of Trade
4 December 1761	Winchelsea	u	The Earl of Thomond	Thomas Sewell	Cofferer of the Household

=== 11th Parliament (1754–1761) ===
Date	Constituency	c/u	Former incumbent	Winner	Position
14 January 1761	Cambridge University	u	Edward Finch	Edward Finch	Surveyor of the King's Private Roads
8 December 1760	Orford	u	Charles FitzRoy	Charles FitzRoy	Groom of the Bedchamber
8 December 1760	Orford	u	John Offley	John Offley	Groom of the Bedchamber
4 December 1760	St Mawes	u	Henry Seymour Conway	Henry Seymour Conway	Groom of the Bedchamber
2 December 1760	Seaford	u	James Peachey	James Peachey	Groom of the Bedchamber
30 January 1760	St Germans	u	Edward Eliot	Edward Eliot	Lord of Trade
26 January 1760	Orford	u	Charles FitzRoy	Charles FitzRoy	Groom of the Bedchamber
18 January 1760	Dysart Burghs	u	James Oswald	James Oswald	Junior Lord of the Treasury
2 January 1760	Norwich	u	Edward Bacon	Edward Bacon	Lord of Trade
1 January 1760	Tavistock	u	Richard Rigby	Richard Rigby	Master of the Rolls in Ireland
26 December 1759	Bristol	u	Robert Nugent	Robert Nugent	Vice-Treasurer of Ireland
20 December 1759	Orford	u	Henry Bilson Legge	Charles FitzRoy	Surveyor of Petty Customs of the Port of London (Note: Bilson Legge sought re-election at Hampshire.)
10 December 1759	Old Sarum	u	Viscount Pulteney	Viscount Pulteney	Accepted a Commission in the Army
4 June 1759	Banbury	u	Lord North	Lord North	Junior Lord of the Treasury
24 June 1758	Reigate	u	Charles Cocks	Charles Cocks	Clerk of the Deliveries of the Ordnance
3 February 1758	East Retford	u	John Shelley	John Shelley	Clerk of the Pipe
31 January 1758	Cambridge	u	Viscount Dupplin	Viscount Dupplin	Chancellor of the Duchy of Lancaster
28 January 1758	Orford	u	Henry Bilson Legge	Henry Bilson Legge	Resignation upon becoming Surveyor of Petty Customs of the Port of London
10 December 1757	Eye	u	Courthorpe Clayton	Courthorpe Clayton	Avener and Clerk Marshal
6 December 1757	Southampton	u	Hans Stanley	Hans Stanley	Lord of the Admiralty
30 July 1757	Anstruther Burghs	u	Sir Henry Erskine	Sir Henry Erskine	Surveyor of the King's Private Roads
12 July 1757	Cockermouth	u	The Earl of Thomond	The Earl of Thomond	Treasurer of the Household
9 July 1757	Orford	u	Henry Bilson Legge	Henry Bilson Legge	Chancellor of the Exchequer
9 July 1757	Orford	u	John Offley	John Offley	Groom of the Bedchamber
7 July 1757	New Woodstock	u	The Viscount Bateman	The Viscount Bateman	Master of the Buckhounds
6 July 1757	Aylesbury	u	Thomas Potter	John Wilkes	Vice-Treasurer of Ireland (Note: Potter sought re-election at Okehampton.)
6 July 1757	Winchelsea	u	Thomas Orby Hunter	Thomas Orby Hunter	Lord of the Admiralty
5 July 1757	New Windsor	c	Henry Fox	Henry Fox	Paymaster of the Forces
14 June 1757	Cambridge University	u	Edward Finch	Edward Finch	Master of the Robes
19 May 1757	Launceston	u	Humphry Morice	Humphry Morice	Second Clerk Comptroller of the Green Cloth
30 April 1757	Huntingdonshire	u	The Lord Carysfort	The Lord Carysfort	Lord of the Admiralty
25 April 1757	Portsmouth	u	Sir William Rowley	Sir William Rowley	Naval Lord
18 April 1757	St Mawes	u	Henry Seymour Conway	Henry Seymour Conway	Groom of the Bedchamber
15 April 1757	Bossiney	u	Edwin Sandys	Edwin Sandys	Lord of the Admiralty
13 April 1757	Weobley	u	Savage Mostyn	Savage Mostyn	Naval Lord
24 December 1756	Sutherland	u	George Mackay	George Mackay	Master of the Mint in Scotland
23 December 1756	Selkirkshire	u	Gilbert Elliot	Gilbert Elliot	Lord of the Admiralty
14 December 1756	Saltash	u	Viscount Duncannon	Charles Townshend	Junior Lord of the Treasury (Note: Duncannon sought re-election at Harwich.)
13 December 1756	Great Yarmouth	u	Charles Townshend	Charles Townshend of Honingham	Treasurer of the Chamber
11 December 1756	Aldborough	u	William Pitt	Nathaniel Cholmley	Southern Secretary (Note: William Pitt sought re-election at Buckingham and Okehampton and sat for Okehampton.)
11 December 1756	Dorchester	u	John Pitt	John Pitt	Lord of the Admiralty
11 December 1756	Orford	u	Henry Bilson Legge	Henry Bilson Legge	Chancellor of the Exchequer
10 December 1756	Aylesbury	c	Thomas Potter	Thomas Potter	Paymaster of the Forces
10 December 1756	Poole	u	Sir Richard Lyttelton	Sir Richard Lyttelton	Master of the Jewel Office
9 December 1756	Penryn	u	Richard Edgcumbe	Richard Edgcumbe	Comptroller of the Household
8 December 1756	Bath	u	Sir Robert Henley	Sir Robert Henley	Attorney General for England and Wales
8 December 1756	Reigate	u	Charles Yorke	Charles Yorke	Solicitor General for England and Wales
8 December 1756	Stockbridge	u	George Hay	The Viscount Powerscourt	Lord of the Admiralty (Note: Hay sought re-election at Calne.)
8 December 1756	Winchelsea	u	Thomas Orby Hunter	Thomas Orby Hunter	Lord of the Admiralty
8 December 1756	New Woodstock	u	The Viscount Bateman	The Viscount Bateman	Treasurer of the Household
7 December 1756	Buckingham	u	George Grenville	George Grenville	Treasurer of the Navy
7 December 1756	Buckingham	u	James Grenville	William Pitt	Junior Lord of the Treasury (Note: James Grenville sought re-election at Buckingham.)
1 June 1756	Newark-on-Trent	u	John Manners	John Manners	Housekeeper at Whitehall
29 April 1756	Petersfield	u	William Gerard Hamilton	William Gerard Hamilton	Lord of Trade
17 April 1756	Orford	u	John Offley	John Offley	Surveyor of the King's Private Roads
19 February 1756	Berwickshire	u	Alexander Hume Campbell	Alexander Hume Campbell	Lord Clerk Register
1 January 1756	Dunwich	u	Soame Jenyns	Soame Jenyns	Lord of Trade
31 December 1755	Weymouth and Melcombe Regis	u	George Bubb Dodington	George Bubb Dodington	Treasurer of the Navy
31 December 1755	Weymouth and Melcombe Regis	u	Welbore Ellis	Welbore Ellis	Vice-Treasurer of Ireland
30 December 1755	Penryn	u	Richard Edgcumbe	Richard Edgcumbe	Lord of the Admiralty
30 December 1755	New Romney	u	Henry Furnese	Henry Furnese	Junior Lord of the Treasury
30 December 1755	Seaford	u	The Viscount Gage	The Viscount Gage	Paymaster of Pensions
30 December 1755	Tavistock	u	Richard Rigby	Richard Rigby	Lord of Trade
29 December 1755	Gloucester	u	George Augustus Selwyn	George Augustus Selwyn	Paymaster of the Works
29 December 1755	Higham Ferrers	u	John Yorke	John Yorke	Patentee for Commissions of Bankruptcy
29 December 1755	Ilchester	u	John Talbot	John Talbot	Lord of Trade
29 December 1755	Norwich	u	Lord Hobart	Lord Hobart	Comptroller of the Household
29 December 1755	Warwick	u	The Earl of Hillsborough	The Earl of Hillsborough	Treasurer of the Chamber
27 December 1755	Cockermouth	u	Percy Wyndham O'Brien	Percy Wyndham O'Brien	Junior Lord of the Treasury
27 December 1755	New Woodstock	u	The Viscount Bateman	The Viscount Bateman	Lord of the Admiralty
22 December 1755	Cambridge	u	Viscount Dupplin	Viscount Dupplin	Paymaster of the Forces
29 November 1755	Okehampton	u	Sir George Lyttelton	Sir George Lyttelton	Chancellor of the Exchequer
25 November 1755	Plymouth	u	The Viscount Barrington	The Viscount Barrington	Secretary at War
24 November 1755	East Retford	u	John Shelley	John Shelley	Keeper of the Records in the Tower of London
22 November 1755	Hedon	u	Charles Saunders	Charles Saunders	Comptroller of the Navy
21 November 1755	Christchurch	u	Sir Thomas Robinson	Sir Thomas Robinson	Master of the Great Wardrobe
19 November 1755	New Windsor	u	Henry Fox	Henry Fox	Southern Secretary
20 December 1754	Edinburghshire	u	Robert Dundas	Robert Dundas	Lord Advocate
9 December 1754	Dartmouth	u	John Jeffreys	John Jeffreys	Warden of the Mint
9 December 1754	Lostwithiel	u	Thomas Clarke	Thomas Clarke	Master of the Rolls

=== 10th Parliament (1747–1754) ===
Date	Constituency	c/u	Former incumbent	Winner	Position
15 February 1754	Boroughbridge	u	Lewis Watson	Lewis Watson	Auditor of the imprests
6 April 1753	Salisbury	u	Edward Poore	Edward Poore	Puisne Justice of Carmarthen
20 January 1753	Bere Alston	u	Sir Francis Henry Drake	Sir Francis Henry Drake	Second Clerk Comptroller of the Green Cloth
20 January 1753	Ludgershall	u	George Augustus Selwyn	George Augustus Selwyn	Registrar of the Court of Chancery in Barbados
2 January 1752	Fifeshire	u	James Oswald	James Oswald	Lord of Trade
30 December 1751	Wilton	u	Robert Sawyer Herbert	Robert Sawyer Herbert	Surveyor General of the Land Revenues of the Crown
26 December 1751	East Looe	u	Francis Gashry	Francis Gashry	Treasurer and Paymaster of the Ordnance
21 November 1751	Bath	u	Robert Henley	Robert Henley	King's Counsel
25 July 1751	Wigtownshire	u	John Stewart	John Stewart	Clerk of the Pipe of the Exchequer in Scotland
2 July 1751	Liskeard	u	Charles Trelawny	Charles Trelawny	Assay-Master of Tin for the Duchy of Cornwall
28 June 1751	St Germans	u	Edward Eliot	Edward Eliot	Receiver General of the Duchy of Cornwall
28 June 1751	Truro	u	Edward Boscawen	Edward Boscawen	Naval Lord
26 June 1751	Tregony	u	William Trevanion	William Trevanion	Auditor of the Duchy of Cornwall
24 June 1751	Chippenham	u	Edward Bayntun Rolt	Edward Bayntun Rolt	Surveyor-General of the Duchy of Cornwall
24 June 1751	Taunton	u	William Rowley	William Rowley	Naval Lord
4 April 1751	Haddington Burghs	u	Andrew Fletcher	Andrew Fletcher	Auditor of the Exchequer in Scotland
1 April 1751	Newark-on-Trent	c	Job Staunton Charlton	Job Staunton Charlton	Clerk of the Deliveries of the Ordnance
15 May 1750	Westminster	c	Viscount Trentham	Viscount Trentham	Lord of the Admiralty
10 April 1750	New Shoreham	u	Charles Frederick	Charles Frederick	Surveyor-General of the Ordnance
18 January 1750	Totnes	u	Sir John Strange	Sir John Strange	Master of the Rolls
27 December 1749	Denbigh Boroughs	u	Richard Myddelton	Richard Myddelton	Steward of Bromfield and Yale
23 December 1749	Christchurch	u	Sir Thomas Robinson	Sir Thomas Robinson	Master of the Great Wardrobe
20 December 1749	Hastings	u	Andrew Stone	Andrew Stone	Lord of Trade
30 November 1749	West Looe	u	William Noel	William Noel	Chief Justice of Chester
19 June 1749	Great Yarmouth	u	Charles Townshend	Charles Townshend	Lord of Trade
17 June 1749	Tavistock	u	Sir Richard Wrottesley	Sir Richard Wrottesley	Second Clerk Comptroller of the Green Cloth
5 May 1749	Orford	u	Henry Legge	Henry Legge	Treasurer of the Navy
3 May 1749	County Durham	u	Henry Vane	Henry Vane	Junior Lord of the Treasury
30 March 1749	Weobley	u	Savage Mostyn	Savage Mostyn	Comptroller of the Navy
30 December 1748	Tamworth	u	Thomas Villiers	Thomas Villiers	Lord of the Admiralty
15 December 1748	Knaresborough	u	Richard Arundell	Richard Arundell	Clerk of the Pipe
21 May 1748	Bury St Edmunds	u	Viscount Petersham	Viscount Petersham	Customer of the Port of Dublin
21 May 1748	Ludlow	u	Sir William Corbet	Sir William Corbet	Clerk of the Pipe
8 March 1748	Derby	u	John Stanhope	John Stanhope	Lord of the Admiralty

=== 9th Parliament (1741–1747) ===
Date	Constituency	c/u	Former incumbent	Winner	Position
28 May 1747	Old Sarum	u	James Grenville	Edward Willes	Receiver of the Crown and Fee Farm Rents for Warwickshire and Leicestershire (Note: James Grenville sought re-election at Bridport.)
10 February 1747	Tregony	u	Henry Penton	Henry Penton	King's Letter Carrier
26 January 1747	Eye	u	Edward Cornwallis	Edward Cornwallis	Groom of the Bedchamber
29 December 1746	Whitchurch	u	John Selwyn	John Selwyn	Paymaster of the Marines
24 November 1746	Cambridge	u	Viscount Dupplin	Viscount Dupplin	Lord of Trade
24 November 1746	Petersfield	u	Francis Fane	Francis Fane	Lord of Trade
22 July 1746	Pembrokeshire	u	John Campbell	John Campbell	Junior Lord of the Treasury
4 July 1746	Knaresborough	u	Richard Arundell	Richard Arundell	Treasurer of the Chamber
30 June 1746	Derby	u	Viscount Duncannon	Viscount Duncannon	Lord of the Admiralty
30 June 1746	Orford	u	Henry Legge	Henry Legge	Junior Lord of the Treasury
31 May 1746	New Windsor	u	Henry Fox	Henry Fox	Secretary at War
19 May 1746	Honiton	u	Sir William Yonge	Sir William Yonge	Vice-Treasurer of Ireland
12 May 1746	Old Sarum	u	William Pitt	William Pitt	Paymaster of the Forces
23 April 1746	Aldeburgh	u	Andrew Wilkinson	Andrew Wilkinson	Storekeeper of the Ordnance
21 April 1746	New Shoreham	u	Charles Frederick	Charles Frederick	Clerk of the Deliveries of the Ordnance
1 March 1746	Berwick-upon-Tweed	u	The Viscount Barrington	The Viscount Barrington	Lord of the Admiralty
26 February 1746	Amersham	u	Thomas Gore	William Drake	Muster-Master General (Note: Gore sought re-election at Portsmouth.)
26 February 1746	Old Sarum	u	James Grenville	James Grenville	Lord of Trade
26 February 1746	Old Sarum	u	William Pitt	William Pitt	Vice-Treasurer of Ireland
3 February 1746	Malton	u	John Mostyn	John Mostyn	Groom of the Bedchamber
28 January 1746	Cirencester	u	Henry Bathurst	Henry Bathurst	King's Counsel
31 October 1745	Grantham	u	Marquess of Granby	Marquess of Granby	Accepted a Commission in the Army
30 October 1745	Ludlow	u	Richard Herbert	Richard Herbert	Accepted a Commission in the Army
8 May 1745	Newcastle-under-Lyme	u	Baptist Leveson Gower	Baptist Leveson Gower	Lord of Trade
19 April 1745	Orford	u	Henry Legge	Henry Legge	Lord of the Admiralty
16 April 1745	Harwich	u	John Phillipson	John Phillipson	Surveyor General of Woods and Forests North and South of Trent
12 February 1745	Dysart Burghs	u	James Oswald	James Oswald	Commissioner of the Navy
21 January 1745	Hedon	u	George Anson	George Anson	Naval Lord
4 January 1745	Knaresborough	u	Richard Arundell	Richard Arundell	Junior Lord of the Treasury
4 January 1745	Okehampton	u	George Lyttelton	George Lyttelton	Junior Lord of the Treasury
3 January 1745	Carmarthen	u	Sir John Philipps	Sir John Philipps	Lord of Trade
2 January 1745	West Looe	u	Benjamin Keene	Benjamin Keene	Paymaster of Pensions
1 January 1745	Wareham	u	John Pitt	John Pitt	Lord of Trade
31 December 1744	Bridgwater	u	George Bubb Dodington	George Bubb Dodington	Treasurer of the Navy
31 December 1744	Plymouth	u	Lord Vere Beauclerk	Lord Vere Beauclerk	Naval Lord
31 December 1744	Stafford	u	William Chetwynd	William Chetwynd	Master of the Mint
29 December 1744	Marlborough	u	Sir John Hynde Cotton	Sir John Hynde Cotton	Treasurer of the Chamber
29 December 1744	Chipping Wycombe	u	Edmund Waller	Edmund Waller	Cofferer of the Household
28 December 1744	Buckingham	u	George Grenville	George Grenville	Lord of the Admiralty
20 December 1744	Kincardineshire	c	Sir James Carnegie	Sir James Carnegie	Accepted a Commission in the Army
20 December 1744	Linlithgowshire	u	Charles Hope Weir	Charles Hope Weir	Commissary General of the Musters in Scotland
5 December 1744	New Woodstock	u	John Spencer	John Spencer	Ranger of Windsor Great Park
13 January 1744	Edinburghshire	c	Sir Charles Gilmour	Sir Charles Gilmour	Lord of Trade
12 January 1744	Sussex	u	Earl of Middlesex	Earl of Middlesex	Junior Lord of the Treasury
30 December 1743	Truro	u	Charles Hamilton	Charles Hamilton	Receiver General of the Revenues of Minorca
29 December 1743	Malton	u	Henry Finch	Henry Finch	Surveyor of the King's Works
28 December 1743	Evesham	u	Sir John Rushout	Sir John Rushout	Treasurer of the Navy
27 December 1743	Guildford	u	Denzil Onslow	Denzil Onslow	Paymaster of the Works
27 December 1743	Worcester	u	Thomas Winnington	Thomas Winnington	Paymaster of the Forces
26 December 1743	New Windsor	u	Henry Fox	Henry Fox	Junior Lord of the Treasury
15 December 1743	Sussex	u	Henry Pelham	Henry Pelham	First Lord of the Treasury
13 December 1743	Harwich	u	John Phillipson	John Phillipson	Lord of the Admiralty
8 December 1743	Thetford	u	Charles Fitzroy	Charles FitzRoy	Groom Porter
13 May 1743	Linlithgowshire	c	George Dundas	Charles Hope Weir	Master of Work to the Crown of Scotland
27 April 1743	Calne	u	William Elliot	William Elliot	Equerry to the King
27 December 1742	West Looe	u	Sir Charles Wager	Sir Charles Wager	Treasurer of the Navy
10 August 1742	Edinburghshire	u	Sir Charles Gilmour	Sir Charles Gilmour	Paymaster of the Works
28 July 1742	Ripon	u	Henry Vane	Henry Vane	Vice-Treasurer of Ireland
27 July 1742	Cockermouth	u	William Finch	William Finch	Vice-Chamberlain of the Household
23 July 1742	Cambridge University	u	Edward Finch	Edward Finch	Groom of the Bedchamber
23 July 1742	Orford	u	Henry Legge	Henry Legge	Surveyor General of Woods, Forests, Parks, and Chases
22 July 1742	Christchurch	u	Edward Hooper	Edward Hooper	Paymaster of Pensions
22 July 1742	Dorchester	u	Nathaniel Gundry	Nathaniel Gundry	King's Counsel
22 July 1742	Grampound	u	Daniel Boone	Daniel Boone	Muster-Master General
15 May 1742	Plympton Erle	u	Thomas Clutterbuck	Thomas Clutterbuck	Treasurer of the Navy
8 April 1742	Andover	u	John Pollen	John Pollen	Justice of Carmarthen
6 April 1742	Hastings	u	Andrew Stone	Andrew Stone	Secretary of Barbados
24 March 1742	Surrey	c	The Lord Baltimore	The Lord Baltimore	Lord of the Admiralty
23 March 1742	Portsmouth	u	Philip Cavendish	Philip Cavendish	Naval Lord
22 March 1742	Brackley	u	George Lee	Sewallis Shirley	Lord of the Admiralty (Note: George Lee sought re-election at Devizes.)
20 March 1742	Lewes	u	John Morley Trevor	John Morley Trevor	Lord of the Admiralty
9 March 1742	Worcester	u	Samuel Sandys	Samuel Sandys	Chancellor of the Exchequer
24 February 1742	Evesham	u	Sir John Rushout	Sir John Rushout	Junior Lord of the Treasury
24 February 1742	Northampton	u	George Compton	George Compton	Junior Lord of the Treasury
23 February 1742	Rye	u	Phillips Gybbon	Phillips Gybbon	Junior Lord of the Treasury
23 January 1742	East Grinstead	u	Earl of Middlesex	John Butler	High Steward of the Honour of Otford (Note: Middlesex sought re-election at Sussex.)

=== 8th Parliament (1735–1741) ===
Date	Constituency	c/u	Former incumbent	Winner	Position
27 December 1740	Malmesbury	u	William Rawlinson Earle	William Rawlinson Earle	Clerk of the Ordnance
24 December 1740	Denbighshire	u	Sir Watkin Williams-Wynn	Sir Watkin Williams-Wynn	Steward of Bromfield and Yale
27 November 1740	Dartmouth	u	George Treby	George Treby	Junior Lord of the Treasury
2 May 1740	Wilton	u	William Herbert	William Herbert	Groom of the Bedchamber
28 April 1740	New Windsor	u	Lord Sidney Beauclerk	Lord Sidney Beauclerk	Vice-Chamberlain of the Household
10 April 1740	Brecon	c	John Talbot	John Talbot	Puisne Justice of Chester
3 January 1740	Monmouthshire	u	Charles Hanbury Williams	Charles Hanbury Williams	Paymaster of the Marines
28 May 1739	New Shoreham	c	John Phillipson	John Phillipson	Commissioner of the Navy
2 June 1738	Bury St Edmunds	u	Thomas Hervey	Thomas Hervey	Surveyor of the King's Gardens
29 May 1738	Helston	u	John Harris	John Harris	Paymaster of the Board of Works
25 May 1738	Dartmouth	u	Walter Carey	Walter Carey	Second Clerk Comptroller of the Green Cloth
22 May 1738	Seaford	u	William Hay	William Hay	Victualling Commissioner
17 May 1738	Kingston upon Hull	u	George Crowle	George Crowle	Commissioner of the Navy
10 March 1738	New Windsor	c	Lord Vere Beauclerk	Lord Vere Beauclerk	Naval Lord (Two MPs elected due to a Double Return)
10 March 1738	New Windsor	c	Lord Vere Beauclerk	Richard Oldfield	Naval Lord (Two MPs elected due to a Double Return)
10 March 1738	New Windsor	c	Lord Vere Beauclerk	Lord Vere Beauclerk	Beauclerk declared elected 27 March 1738
10 March 1738	New Windsor	c	Richard Oldfield	Lord Vere Beauclerk	Beauclerk declared elected 27 March 1738
13 February 1738	Stamford	u	William Noel	William Noel	King's Counsel
1 February 1738	Ripon	u	William Aislabie	William Aislabie	Auditor of the Imprest
4 August 1737	Dumfriesshire	u	Charles Erskine	Charles Erskine	Lord Advocate
7 July 1737	Knaresborough	u	Richard Arundell	Richard Arundell	Master of the Mint
7 July 1737	Northumberland	u	Ralph Jenison	Ralph Jenison	Master of the Buckhounds
1 July 1737	Hythe	u	William Glanville	William Glanville	Irish Revenue Commissioner
30 June 1737	Wilton	u	Robert Sawyer Herbert	Robert Sawyer Herbert	Lord of Trade
28 June 1737	Malmesbury	u	Giles Earle	Giles Earle	Junior Lord of the Treasury
27 June 1737	Newport (I.o.W.)	u	The Viscount Boyne	The Viscount Boyne	Irish Revenue Commissioner
27 June 1737	Whitchurch	u	John Mordaunt	John Mordaunt	Equerry to the King
22 June 1737	Chippenham	c	Rogers Holland	Edward Bayntun Rolt	Chief Justice of the North Wales Circuit
22 June 1737	Hindon	u	Henry Fox	Henry Fox	Surveyor-General of Works
10 February 1737	Tiverton	u	Dudley Ryder	Dudley Ryder	Attorney General for England and Wales
22 June 1736	Pembrokeshire	u	John Campbell	John Campbell	Lord of the Admiralty
28 May 1736	Droitwich	u	Thomas Winnington	Thomas Winnington	Junior Lord of the Treasury
5 April 1736	Hythe	u	Hercules Baker	Hercules Baker	Treasurer of Greenwich Hospital
24 February 1736	Dorchester	u	John Browne	John Browne	King's Counsel
27 May 1735	St Mawes	u	Richard Plumer	Richard Plumer	Lord of Trade
21 May 1735	Reading	u	Richard Potenger	Richard Potenger	Puisne Justice of Chester
20 May 1735	Wendover	u	John Hampden	John Hampden	Commissary General for Gibraltar
20 May 1735	Horsham	u	Henry Ingram	Henry Ingram	Commissary General of Stores for Minorca
17 May 1735	Honiton	u	Sir William Yonge	Sir William Yonge	Secretary at War
9 April 1735	Hastings	u	Sir William Ashburnham	Sir William Ashburnham	Receiver of Fines in the Alienation Office
27 February 1735	Aldeburgh	u	George Purvis	George Purvis	Commissioner of the Navy

=== 7th Parliament (1727–1734) ===
Date	Constituency	c/u	Former incumbent	Winner	Position
28 January 1734	St Germans	u	Dudley Ryder	Dudley Ryder	Solicitor General for England and Wales
28 January 1734	West Looe	u	John Willes	John Willes	Attorney General for England and Wales
26 January 1734	Downton	u	John Verney	John Verney	Chief Justice of Chester
3 August 1733	Selkirkshire	u	James Rutherford	James Rutherford	Commissary of Peebles
4 July 1733	Hampshire	u	Lord Harry Powlett	Lord Harry Powlett	Naval Lord
25 June 1733	Andover	u	James Brudenell	James Brudenell	Groom of the Bedchamber
11 June 1733	Mitchell	u	Thomas Farrington	Thomas Farrington	Auditor of the Land Revenues for Wales
29 May 1733	Northallerton	u	Leonard Smelt	Leonard Smelt	Clerk of the Ordnance
22 May 1733	Malmesbury	u	William Rawlinson Earle	William Rawlinson Earle	Clerk of the Deliveries of the Ordnance
7 March 1733	Kingston upon Hull	u	George Crowle	George Crowle	Victualling Commissioner
1 February 1733	Bath	u	George Wade	George Wade	Governor of Berwick-upon-Tweed
23 January 1733	Northampton	u	Edward Montagu	Edward Montagu	Governor of Kingston upon Hull
15 June 1732	Liskeard	u	Thomas Clutterbuck	Thomas Clutterbuck	Lord of the Admiralty
15 May 1732	New Windsor	u	Lord Vere Beauclerk	Lord Vere Beauclerk	Commissioner of the Navy
15 April 1732	Minehead	u	Francis Whitworth	Francis Whitworth	Surveyor General of Woods, Forests, Parks, and Chases
21 January 1732	Plymouth	u	Robert Byng	Robert Byng	Commissioner of the Navy
4 June 1731	Ayr Burghs	u	William Steuart	William Steuart	Paymaster of Pensions
17 May 1731	Knaresborough	u	Richard Arundell	Richard Arundell	Surveyor of the King's Private Roads
3 May 1731	Rochester	u	David Polhill	David Polhill	Keeper of the Records in the Tower of London
9 February 1731	Yarmouth	u	Maurice Morgan	Maurice Morgan	Lieutenant Governor of the Isle of Wight
22 June 1730	Bere Alston	u	Sir Archer Croft	Sir Archer Croft	Lord of Trade
30 May 1730	Thirsk	u	Sir Thomas Frankland	Sir Thomas Frankland	Lord of the Admiralty
29 May 1730	Richmond	u	Sir Conyers Darcy	Sir Conyers Darcy	Comptroller of the Household
27 May 1730	Newport (I.o.W.)	u	William Fortescue	William Fortescue	King's Counsel
26 May 1730	Droitwich	u	Thomas Winnington	Thomas Winnington	Lord of the Admiralty
26 May 1730	Andover	u	James Brudenell	James Brudenell	Lord of Trade
22 May 1730	Scarborough	u	Sir William Strickland	Sir William Strickland	Secretary at War
21 May 1730	Dartmouth	u	George Treby	George Treby	Master of the Household
21 May 1730	Sussex	u	Henry Pelham	Henry Pelham	Paymaster of the Forces
20 May 1730	Totnes	u	Exton Sayer	Exton Sayer	Surveyor General of the Land Revenues of the Crown
18 May 1730	King's Lynn	u	Sir Charles Turner	Sir Charles Turner	Teller of the Exchequer
16 May 1730	Bury St Edmunds	u	Lord Hervey	Lord Hervey	Vice-Chamberlain of the Household
16 May 1730	Bury St Edmunds	u	Thomas Norton	Thomas Norton	Deputy Governor of Chelsea Hospital
14 May 1730	Great Yarmouth	c	Horatio Walpole	Horatio Walpole	Cofferer of the Household
14 May 1730	Honiton	u	Sir William Yonge	Sir William Yonge	Junior Lord of the Treasury
13 February 1730	Aylesbury	c	Philip Lloyd	Thomas Ingoldsby	Equerry to the King
30 January 1730	Weobley	c	John Birch	John Birch	Cursitor Baron of the Exchequer
5 August 1729	Stirling Burghs	u	Lord Erskine	Lord Erskine	Accepted a Commission in the Army
1 July 1729	Lanarkshire	u	Lord Archibald Hamilton	Lord Archibald Hamilton	Naval Lord
2 June 1729	Newport (I.o.W.)	u	George Huxley	George Huxley	Muster-Master General
29 May 1729	Dartmouth	u	Walter Carey	Walter Carey	Clerk of the Privy Council
28 May 1729	Liverpool	c	Thomas Brereton	Sir Thomas Aston	Victualling Commissioner
22 May 1729	Malton	u	Henry Finch	Henry Finch	Receiver General of Revenues of Minorca
13 March 1729	Dorchester	u	William Chapple	William Chapple	Chief Justice of Carnarvon, Merioneth and Anglesey
3 March 1729	Aldborough	u	William Jessop	William Jessop	Puisne Justice of Chester
27 February 1729	West Looe	u	John Willes	John Willes	Chief Justice of Chester
29 January 1729	Lyme Regis	c	Henry Holt Henley	Henry Holt Henley	Clerk of the Pipe
16 July 1728	Roxburghshire	u	William Douglas	William Douglas	Keeper of Register of Hornings
6 June 1728	Honiton	u	Sir William Yonge	Sir William Yonge	Lord of the Admiralty
6 June 1728	Thirsk	u	Sir Thomas Frankland	Sir Thomas Frankland	Lord of Trade
3 June 1728	Malmesbury	u	Giles Earle	Giles Earle	Irish Revenue Commissioner
28 February 1728	Milborne Port	u	Thomas Medlycott	Thomas Medlycott	Irish Revenue Commissioner

=== 6th Parliament (1722–1727) ===
Date	Constituency	c/u	Former incumbent	Winner	Position
22 June 1727	Elginshire	u	Alexander Brodie	Alexander Brodie	Lord Lyon King of Arms
7 June 1727	Worcestershire	u	Sir Thomas Lyttelton	Sir Thomas Lyttelton	Lord of the Admiralty
22 May 1727	East Looe	u	Viscount Malpas	Viscount Malpas	Master of the Robes
17 May 1727	Horsham	u	Henry Ingram	Henry Ingram	Commissary General of Stores at Gibraltar
7 April 1727	Whitchurch	u	John Conduitt	John Conduitt	Master of the Mint
15 February 1727	Higham Ferrers	u	John Finch	John Finch	King's Counsel
28 January 1727	Petersfield	c	Edmund Miller	Joseph Taylor	Baron of the Exchequer in Scotland
28 January 1727	Petersfield	c	Joseph Taylor	Edmund Miller	By-election results reversed on petition 4 May 1727
26 January 1727	Lostwithiel	c	Henry Parsons	Sir William Stanhope	Victualling Commissioner (Note: Parsons sought re-election at Maldon.)
25 January 1727	Downton	u	John Verney	John Verney	Second Justice of the Brecon Circuit
16 June 1726	Westmorland	u	Anthony Lowther	Anthony Lowther	Irish Revenue Commissioner
1 June 1726	Dartmouth	u	Thomas Martyn	Thomas Martyn	Justice for Caernarvon, Merioneth and Anglesey
1 June 1726	Grampound	u	Marquess of Hartington	Marquess of Hartington	Captain of the Gentlemen Pensioners
31 May 1726	Launceston	u	John Willes	Henry Vane	Second Justice of Chester (Note: Willes sought re-election at Weymouth.)
30 May 1726	Ipswich	u	Sir William Thompson	Sir William Thompson	Cursitor Baron of the Exchequer
21 May 1726	Rye	u	Phillips Gybbon	Phillips Gybbon	Surveyor General of the Land Revenues of the Crown
14 May 1726	Preston	u	Daniel Pulteney	Daniel Pulteney	Clerk of the Council in Ireland
6 May 1726	Sudbury	c	William Windham	William Windham	Lieutenant Governor of Chelsea Hospital
2 May 1726	Durham City	u	Charles Talbot	Charles Talbot	Solicitor General for England and Wales
28 April 1726	Knaresborough	u	Richard Arundell	Richard Arundell	Surveyor-General of the King's Works
29 January 1726	West Looe	u	Edward Trelawny	Edward Trelawny	Victualling Commissioner
2 July 1725	Dumfriesshire	u	Charles Erskine	Charles Erskine	Solicitor General for Scotland
30 June 1725	Inverness Burghs	u	Duncan Forbes	Duncan Forbes	Lord Advocate
28 June 1725	Bodmin	c	Richard West	Richard West	Lord Chancellor of Ireland
16 June 1725	York	u	Edward Thompson	Edward Thompson	Irish Revenue Commissioner
16 June 1725	Rutland	u	Lord Finch	Lord Finch	Comptroller of the Household
14 June 1725	Helston	u	Walter Carey	Walter Carey	Warden of the Mint
14 June 1725	Scarborough	u	Sir William Strickland	Sir William Strickland	Junior Lord of the Treasury
9 June 1725	Bedford	c	George Huxley	John Thurlow Brace	Victualling Commissioner
5 June 1725	Sandwich	c	Sir George Oxenden	Sir George Oxenden	Lord of the Admiralty
3 June 1725	Brackley	u	Paul Methuen	Sir Paul Methuen	Treasurer of the Household
26 January 1725	Reigate	u	Sir Joseph Jekyll	Sir Joseph Jekyll	First Commissioner of the Great Seal
23 November 1724	Steyning	c	John Gumley	John Gumley	Commissioner General of Musters
9 May 1724	Thirsk	u	Thomas Frankland	Thomas Frankland	Irish Revenue Commissioner
1 May 1724	Plymouth	u	Pattee Byng	Pattee Byng	Treasurer of the Navy
21 April 1724	Newark-on-Trent	u	Richard Sutton	Richard Sutton	Second Clerk Comptroller of the Green Cloth
18 April 1724	Plympton Erle	u	Richard Edgcumbe	Richard Edgcumbe	Joint Vice-Treasurer of Ireland
18 April 1724	Plympton Erle	u	George Treby	George Treby	Teller of the Exchequer
16 April 1724	Sussex	u	Henry Pelham	Henry Pelham	Secretary at War
10 April 1724	Bridgwater	u	George Bubb Dodington	George Bubb Dodington	Junior Lord of the Treasury
10 April 1724	Honiton	u	William Yonge	William Yonge	Junior Lord of the Treasury
5 February 1724	Seaford	u	Sir Philip Yorke	Sir Philip Yorke	Attorney General for England and Wales
29 January 1724	Hampshire	u	Lord Nassau Powlett	Lord Nassau Powlett	Auditor General of Revenue in Ireland
12 June 1723	Hedon	u	William Pulteney	William Pulteney	Cofferer of the Household
10 June 1723	King's Lynn	u	Robert Walpole	Robert Walpole	Secretary of State
6 June 1723	Dover	u	George Berkeley	George Berkeley	Master of St Katharine's Hospital
3 June 1723	Wilton	u	Robert Sawyer Herbert	Robert Sawyer Herbert	Groom of the Bedchamber
3 November 1722	Eye	u	Edward Hopkins	Edward Hopkins	Master of the Revels in Ireland

=== 5th Parliament (1715–1722) ===
Date	Constituency	c/u	Former incumbent	Winner	Position
7 November 1721	Tregony	u	Daniel Pulteney	John Merrill	Lord of the Admiralty (Note: Daniel Pulteney sought re-election at Hedon.)
1 November 1721	St Ives	c	Sir John Hobart	Sir John Hobart	Lord of Trade
12 April 1721	Carlisle	c	Thomas Stanwix	Henry Aglionby	Governor of Kingston upon Hull
10 April 1721	King's Lynn	u	Robert Walpole	Robert Walpole	First Lord of the Treasury and Chancellor of the Exchequer
10 April 1721	Seaford	u	Henry Pelham	Henry Pelham	Junior Lord of the Treasury
19 December 1720	Plymouth	u	Sir George Byng	Sir George Byng	Treasurer of the Navy
14 December 1720	Rochester	u	Sir John Jennings	Sir John Jennings	Governor of Greenwich Hospital
19 July 1720	Heytesbury	u	Edward Ashe	Edward Ashe	Lord of Trade
11 July 1720	Kingston upon Hull	u	Sir William St Quintin	Sir William St Quintin	Joint Vice-Treasurer of Ireland
24 June 1720	Brackley	u	Paul Methuen	Paul Methuen	Comptroller of the Household
23 June 1720	Castle Rising	u	Charles Churchill	Charles Churchill	Governor of Royal Hospital Chelsea
23 June 1720	Plympton Erle	u	Richard Edgcumbe	Richard Edgcumbe	Junior Lord of the Treasury
22 June 1720	King's Lynn	u	Robert Walpole	Robert Walpole	Paymaster of the Forces
22 June 1720	King's Lynn	u	Sir Charles Turner	Sir Charles Turner	Junior Lord of the Treasury
18 June 1720	Boroughbridge	u	Sir Wilfrid Lawson	Sir Wilfrid Lawson	Groom of the Bedchamber
18 June 1720	Bossiney	u	Henry Cartwright	Henry Cartwright	Victualling Commissioner
14 June 1720	Old Sarum	u	Sir William Strickland	Sir William Strickland	Muster-Master General
11 June 1720	Corfe Castle	u	Joshua Churchill	Joshua Churchill	Victualling Commissioner
7 June 1720	Seaford	u	Henry Pelham	Henry Pelham	Treasurer of the Chamber
25 May 1720	Nottingham	u	John Plumptre	John Plumptre	Treasurer of the Ordnance
21 May 1720	Ludlow	u	Sir Robert Raymond	Sir Robert Raymond	Attorney General for England and Wales
11 May 1720	Haddington Burghs	u	Sir David Dalrymple	Sir David Dalrymple	Auditor of the Exchequer in Scotland
20 April 1720	Chippenham	u	Giles Earle	Giles Earle	First Clerk Comptroller of the Green Cloth
30 March 1720	Lewes	u	Philip Yorke	Philip Yorke	Solicitor General for England and Wales
25 March 1720	Winchelsea	u	Robert Bristow	Robert Bristow	Second Clerk Comptroller of the Green Cloth
10 March 1720	Shropshire	u	Sir Robert Corbet	Sir Robert Corbet	Second Clerk of the Green Cloth
2 February 1720	Newark-on-Trent	u	Conyers Darcy	Conyers Darcy	Master of the Household
30 April 1719	Totnes	u	Charles Wills	Charles Wills	Lieutenant General of the Ordnance
10 January 1719	St Germans	u	John Knight	John Knight	Secretary of the Leeward Islands
29 December 1718	Plympton Erle	u	George Treby	George Treby	Secretary at War
21 November 1718	Shaftesbury	c	William Benson	William Benson	Surveyor of the King's Works
21 November 1718	Shaftesbury	c	William Benson	Sir Edward des Bouverie	By-election results reversed 24 January 1719
24 April 1718	Lichfield	c	Walter Chetwynd	William Sneyd	Paymaster of Pensions
24 April 1718	Lichfield	c	William Sneyd	Walter Chetwynd	By-election results reversed on petition 10 December 1718
9 April 1718	Buckinghamshire	u	Richard Hampden	Richard Hampden	Treasurer of the Navy
5 April 1718	Scarborough	u	William Thompson	William Thompson	Warden of the Mint
4 April 1718	Ripon	u	John Aislabie	John Aislabie	Chancellor of the Exchequer
29 March 1718	Arundel	u	Thomas Micklethwaite	Joseph Micklethwaite	Lieutenant-General of the Ordnance and Death
29 March 1718	New Woodstock	u	William Clayton	William Clayton	Junior Lord of the Treasury
28 March 1718	Portsmouth	u	Sir Charles Wager	Sir Charles Wager	Naval Lord
28 March 1718	Rye	u	Sir John Norris	Sir John Norris	Naval Lord
28 March 1718	East Retford	u	Thomas White	Thomas White	Clerk of the Ordnance
28 March 1718	Dover	u	Matthew Aylmer	Matthew Aylmer	Master of Greenwich Hospital
25 March 1718	Rochester	u	Sir John Jennings	Sir John Jennings	Naval Lord
20 March 1718	Tregony	u	James Craggs the Younger	James Craggs the Younger	Southern Secretary
19 March 1718	Tewkesbury	u	Nicholas Lechmere	Nicholas Lechmere	Attorney General for England and Wales
31 December 1717	Guildford	u	Denzil Onslow	Robert Wroth	Out-Ranger of Windsor Forest (Note: Denzil Onslow sought re-election at Surrey.)
26 December 1717	Launceston	u	John Anstis	John Anstis	Garter King of Arms
18 December 1717	Reading	u	Owen Buckingham	Owen Buckingham	Victualling Commissioner
29 November 1717	Penryn	u	Hugh Boscawen	Hugh Boscawen	Joint Vice-Treasurer of Ireland
9 August 1717	Truro	u	Spencer Cowper	Spencer Cowper	Chief Justice of Chester
8 August 1717	Fifeshire	u	Sir John Anstruther	Sir John Anstruther	Master of Work to the Crown of Scotland
27 July 1717	West Looe	u	Thomas Maynard	Thomas Maynard	Commissioner for Stores in Minorca
26 July 1717	Lymington	u	Sir Joseph Jekyll	Sir Joseph Jekyll	Master of the Rolls
23 July 1717	Lewes	u	Thomas Pelham	Thomas Pelham	Lord of Trade
24 July 1717	Aldborough	u	William Jessop	William Jessop	Commissioner and Receiver of the Alienation Office
22 July 1717	Stockbridge	u	Martin Bladen	Martin Bladen	Lord of Trade
8 July 1717	Cockermouth	c	Nicholas Lechmere (Note: Nicholas Lechmere sought re-election at Tewkesbury.)	Lord Percy Seymour	Chancellor of the Duchy of Lancaster (Two MPs elected due to a Double Return)
8 July 1717	Cockermouth	c	Nicholas Lechmere	Wilfrid Lawson	Chancellor of the Duchy of Lancaster (Two MPs elected due to a Double Return)
8 July 1717	Cockermouth	c	Lord Percy Seymour	Lord Percy Seymour	Seymour declared elected 18 January 1718
8 July 1717	Cockermouth	c	Wilfrid Lawson	Lord Percy Seymour	Seymour declared elected 18 January 1718
29 May 1717	Gloucestershire	c	Matthew Moreton	Matthew Moreton	Vice-Treasurer of Ireland
2 May 1717	Berwickshire	u	George Baillie	George Baillie	Junior Lord of the Treasury
2 May 1717	Haddingtonshire	u	John Cockburn	John Cockburn	Lord of the Admiralty
1 May 1717	Hampshire	u	John Wallop	John Wallop	Junior Lord of the Treasury
29 April 1717	Cockermouth	c	James Stanhope	Thomas Pengelly	First Lord of the Treasury and Chancellor of the Exchequer (Note: James Stanhope sought re-election at Newport (I.o.w.).)
26 April 1717	Arundel	u	Thomas Micklethwaite	Thomas Micklethwaite	Junior Lord of the Treasury
25 April 1717	Malmesbury	u	Joseph Addison	Joseph Addison	Southern Secretary
25 April 1717	Stafford	u	William Richard Chetwynd	William Richard Chetwynd	Lord of the Admiralty
24 April 1717	Dover	u	Matthew Aylmer	Matthew Aylmer	Naval Lord
22 April 1717	Bridport	u	William Coventry	William Coventry	Second Clerk Comptroller of the Green Cloth
22 April 1717	Tregony	u	James Craggs the Younger	James Craggs the Younger	Secretary at War
12 April 1717	New Woodstock	u	Sir Thomas Wheate	Sir Thomas Wheate	Storekeeper of the Ordnance
28 February 1717	Ipswich	u	Sir William Thompson	Sir William Thompson	Solicitor General for England and Wales
11 July 1716	Plympton Erle	u	Richard Edgcumbe	Richard Edgcumbe	Junior Lord of the Treasury
9 July 1716	Brackley	u	Paul Methuen	Paul Methuen	Southern Secretary
4 July 1716	Buckinghamshire	u	Richard Hampden	Richard Hampden	Teller of the Exchequer
28 June 1716	Eye	u	Edward Hopkins	Edward Hopkins	Irish Revenue Commissioner
3 April 1716	Andover	u	James Brudenell	James Brudenell	Master of the Jewel Office
19 March 1716	Castle Rising	u	William Feilding	William Feilding	First Clerk Comptroller of the Green Cloth
26 January 1716	Malmesbury	u	Joseph Addison	Joseph Addison	Lord of Trade
24 January 1716	Bere Alston	u	Lawrence Carter	Lawrence Carter	King's Counsel
14 January 1716	Midhurst	u	John Fortescue Aland	John Fortescue Alan	Solicitor General for England and Wales
2 January 1716	Carmarthen	u	Richard Vaughan	Richard Vaughan	Chief Justice of the Carmarthen Circuit
27 December 1715	Newark-on-Trent	c	Conyers Darcy	Conyers Darcy	Commissioner exercising the office of Master of the Horse
7 December 1715	Bletchingley	u	Thomas Onslow	William Clayton	Out-Ranger of Windsor Forest (Note: Thomas Onslow sought re-election at Surrey.)
2 December 1715	Bedford	u	William Farrer	William Farrer	Master of St Katharine's by the Tower
17 November 1715	Winchester	u	Lord William Powlett	Lord William Powlett	Teller of the Exchequer
8 November 1715	King's Lynn	u	Robert Walpole	Robert Walpole	First Lord of the Treasury and Chancellor of the Exchequer
5 November 1715	Wenlock	u	Thomas Newport	Thomas Newport	Junior Lord of the Treasury
2 November 1715	Rutland	u	Lord Finch	Lord Finch	Junior Lord of the Treasury
11 October 1715	Worcester	u	Thomas Wylde	Thomas Wylde	Irish Revenue Commissioner
7 October 1715	Ayrshire	u	John Montgomerie	John Montgomerie	Accepted a Commission in the Army
27 May 1715	Renfrewshire	u	Sir Robert Pollock	Sir Robert Pollock	Governor of Fort William
21 April 1715	Thirsk	u	Thomas Frankland	Thomas Frankland	Clerk of the Deliveries of the Ordnance
7 April 1715	Portsmouth	u	Sir Charles Wager	Sir Charles Wager	Comptroller of the Navy

=== 4th Parliament (1713–1715) ===
Date	Constituency	c/u	Former incumbent	Winner	Position
12 August 1714	Truro	u	Thomas Hare	Thomas Hare	First Register and Clerk of the Crown in Barbados
4 May 1714	Droitwich	u	Edward Jeffreys	Edward Jeffreys	Puisne Justice of Chester
22 April 1714	Leicester	u	Sir George Beaumont	Sir George Beaumont	Lord of the Admiralty
15 April 1714	Forfarshire	u	John Carnegie	John Carnegie	Solicitor General for Scotland
5 April 1714	Elgin Burghs	u	James Murray	James Murray	Commissary for Commercial Negotiations with France
20 March 1714	Dartmouth	u	Frederick Herne	John Fownes	Commissioner for Settling Trade with France and Death
18 March 1714	Hastings	c	Sir Joseph Martin	Sir Joseph Martin	Commissary for Commercial Negotiations with France
16 March 1714	Whitchurch	u	Thomas Vernon	Thomas Vernon	Lord of Trade
15 March 1714	Ripon	u	John Sharp	John Sharp	Lord of Trade
15 March 1714	Penryn	c	Alexander Pendarves	Samuel Trefusis	Surveyor General of Crown Lands

=== 3rd Parliament (1710–1713) ===
Date	Constituency	c/u	Former incumbent	Winner	Position
22 April 1713	Castle Rising	u	Horatio Walpole	Horatio Walpole	Irish Revenue Commissioner
15 April 1713	Westminster	u	Thomas Medlycott	Thomas Medlycott	Irish Revenue Commissioner
7 August 1712	Sussex	u	Charles Eversfield	Charles Eversfield	Paymaster and Treasurer of the Ordnance
30 July 1712	Hampshire	u	Sir Simeon Stuart	Sir Simeon Stuart	Chamberlain of the Exchequer
22 July 1712	Devon	c	Sir William Pole	Sir William Courtenay	Master of the Household
18 July 1712	Cambridge	u	John Hynde Cotton	John Hynde Cotton	Lord of Trade
18 July 1712	Cambridge University	u	Dixie Windsor	Dixie Windsor	Storekeeper of the Ordnance
18 July 1712	Newport (I.o.w.)	u	William Stephens	William Stephens	Victualling Commissioner
16 July 1712	Hereford	u	Thomas Foley	Thomas Foley	Lord of Trade
13 July 1712	Somerset	u	Sir William Wyndham	Sir William Wyndham	Secretary at War
9 July 1712	Lostwithiel	u	John Hill	John Hill	Lieutenant-General of the Ordnance
2 July 1712	Scarborough	u	John Hungerford	John Hungerford	Commissioner of the Alienation Office
15 March 1712	Launceston	u	Francis Scobell	Francis Scobell	Receiver General of Cornwall
20 February 1712	Camelford	u	Bernard Granville	Sir Bourchier Wrey	Lieutenant-Governor of Kingston upon Hull (Note: Granville sought re-election at Fowey.)
10 January 1712	Wigtown Burghs	u	William Cochrane	William Cochrane	Joint-Keeper of the Signet
9 January 1712	Knaresborough	u	Robert Byerley	Robert Byerley	Commissioner of the Privy Seal
8 January 1712	Peeblesshire	c	Alexander Murray	Alexander Murray	Commissioner of Chamberlainry and Trade
4 January 1712	Leicester	u	Sir George Beaumont	Sir George Beaumont	Commissioner of the Privy Seal
31 December 1711	Shaftesbury	u	Edward Nicholas	Edward Nicholas	Commissioner of the Privy Seal
27 December 1711	Newport (Cornwall)	u	George Courtenay	George Courtenay	Victualling Commissioner
27 December 1711	Stirlingshire	u	Sir Hugh Paterson	Sir Hugh Paterson	Commissioner of Chamberlainry and Trade
26 December 1711	Chester	u	Sir Henry Bunbury	Sir Henry Bunbury	Irish Revenue Commissioner
26 December 1711	Flintshire	u	Sir Roger Mostyn	Sir Roger Mostyn	Paymaster of Marines
26 December 1711	Selkirkshire	u	John Pringle	John Pringle	Joint-Keeper of the Signet
18 December 1711	Fowey	u	Henry Vincent (junior)	Henry Vincent (junior)	Victualling Commissioner
18 December 1711	Fowey	u	Viscount Dupplin	Viscount Dupplin	Teller of the Exchequer
17 December 1711	Canterbury	u	Henry Lee	Henry Lee	Victualling Commissioner
13 December 1711	Staffordshire	u	Henry Paget	Henry Paget	Captain of the Yeomen of the Guard
18 July 1711	Droitwich	u	Edward Jeffreys	Edward Jeffreys	Puisne Justice of the Great Sessions for Carmarthenshire, Cardiganshire, and Pembrokeshire
18 July 1711	Glamorganshire	u	Sir Thomas Mansel	Sir Thomas Mansel	Teller of the Exchequer
4 July 1711	York	u	Robert Benson	Robert Benson	Chancellor of the Exchequer
3 July 1711	Newton	u	John Ward	John Ward	Puisne Justice of Chester
2 July 1711	Somerset	u	Sir William Wyndham	Sir William Wyndham	Master of the Buckhounds
26 June 1711	Ilchester	u	Edward Phelips	Edward Phelips	Comptroller of the Mint
26 June 1711	Totnes	u	Francis Gwyn	Francis Gwyn	Lord of Trade
21 June 1711	Hertford	u	Charles Caesar	Charles Caesar	Treasurer of the Navy
20 June 1711	Surrey	u	Heneage Finch	Heneage Finch	Master of the Jewel Office
2 June 1711	Ilchester	u	Samuel Masham	Sir James Bateman	Cofferer of the Household (Note: Masham sought re-election at New Windsor.)
29 May 1711	Northumberland	u	Earl of Hertford	Earl of Hertford	Governor of Tynemouth Castle
26 February 1711	Oxford	u	Sir John Walter	Sir John Walter	Clerk Comptroller of the Green Cloth
21 February 1711	Portsmouth	u	Sir James Wishart	Sir James Wishart	Naval Lord
1 February 1711	Carlisle	u	Thomas Stanwix	Thomas Stanwix	Governor of Gibraltar
2 January 1711	Newtown	u	James Worsley	James Worsley	Woodward of New Forest
12 December 1710	Andover	u	John Smith	John Smith	Teller of the Exchequer

=== 2nd Parliament (1708–1710) ===
Date	Constituency	c/u	Former incumbent	Winner	Position
14 April 1710	Bedford	u	William Farrer	William Farrer	Clerk of the Pipe
6 March 1710	Liskeard	u	William Bridges	William Bridges	Surveyor-General of the Ordnance
4 February 1710	King's Lynn	u	Robert Walpole	Robert Walpole	Treasurer of the Navy
7 January 1710	Hythe	u	John Fane	John Fane	Commission in the Army
28 December 1709	Devizes	u	Paul Methuen	Paul Methuen	Lord of the Admiralty
15 December 1709	Haddington Burghs	u	Sir David Dalrymple	Sir David Dalrymple	Lord Advocate
8 December 1709	Northumberland	u	Earl of Hertford	Earl of Hertford	Accepted a Commission in the Army
7 December 1709	Aylesbury	c	Sir John Wittewrong	Sir John Wittewrong	Accepted a Commission in the Army
2 December 1709	Bridgwater	u	George Dodington	George Dodington	Lord of the Admiralty
2 December 1709	Dover	u	Matthew Aylmer	Matthew Aylmer	Admiral and Commander in Chief of the Fleet
2 December 1709	Plymouth	u	Sir George Byng	Sir George Byng	Naval Lord
25 November 1709	Rochester	u	Sir John Leake	Sir John Leake	Naval Lord
25 November 1709	Stafford	u	Walter Chetwynd	Walter Chetwynd	Master of the Buckhounds
20 November 1709	Malton	u	William Strickland	William Strickland	Irish Revenue Commissioner
27 April 1709	Norfolk	u	Sir John Holland	Sir John Holland	Comptroller of the Household
12 March 1709	Arundel	c	The Viscount Shannon	The Viscount Shannon	Deputy Governor of Dover Castle
15 December 1708	Carlisle	u	Sir James Montagu	Sir James Montagu	Attorney General for England and Wales
9 December 1708	Bury St Edmunds	u	Sir Thomas Felton	Sir Thomas Felton	Comptroller of the Household
4 December 1708	Salisbury	u	Robert Eyre	Robert Eyre	Solicitor General for England and Wales
3 December 1708	Cricklade	u	Edmund Dunch	Edmund Dunch	Master of the Household

=== 1st Parliament (1707–1708) ===
Date	Constituency	c/u	Former incumbent	Winner	Position
6 March 1708	King's Lynn	u	Robert Walpole	Robert Walpole	Secretary at War
2 March 1708	Sandwich	u	Josiah Burchett	Josiah Burchett	Secretary to the Marines
21 February 1708	Westminster	u	Henry Boyle	Henry Boyle	Northern Secretary
1 December 1707	Hedon	u	Anthony Duncombe	Anthony Duncombe	Commissioner of Prizes (Note: Held an office incompatible with membership of Parliament under the Regency Act. Re-elected after resigning office.)
2 December 1707	Lymington	u	Paul Burrard, junior	Paul Burrard, junior	Sub-Commissioner of Prizes at Portsmouth
29 November 1707	Chipping Wycombe	u	Fleetwood Dormer	Fleetwood Dormer	Commissioner of Prizes
29 November 1707	Great Bedwyn	c	Nicholas Pollexfen	Tracy Pauncefort	Commissioner of Prizes
29 November 1707	Great Bedwyn	c	Tracy Pauncefort	Nicholas Pollexfen	By-election result reversed on petition 22 December 1707
29 November 1707	Aldborough	u	William Jessop	William Jessop	Justice of the Anglesey Circuit
28 November 1707	New Romney	u	John Brewer	John Brewer	Receiver General of Prizes

== See also ==
- List of ministerial by-elections to the Parliament of the United Kingdom (from 1801-)
