= Sybella Mary Crawley-Boevey =

British author

- Born: 1851; Gloucestershire, England
- Died: 1911 (aged 59–60)
- Occupation: Author
- Relatives: Charlotte Mary Yonge, Thomas Hyde Page, Arthur William Crawley Boevey
- Writing career
- Period: Victorian
- Genre: Fiction

Sybella Mary Crawley-Boevey (1851-1911) was an English novelist.

== Biography ==
Sybella Mary Crawley-Boevey was born in 1851 at Flaxley Abbey, Gloucestershire, the youngest daughter of Sir Martin Hyde Crawley-Boevey, 4th Baronet. She is the sister of author and civil servant Arthur William Crawley Boevey and the cousin of famous Victorian author Charlotte Mary Yonge.

In 1888, Crawley-Boevey wrote Dene Forest Sketches (1888), a study about the Forest of Dean where her father was the verderer. She followed this with two novels: the mystical-themed Beyond Cloudland (1888) and the love story Conscience Makes the Martyr (1894)

== Works ==
Date	Title
1888	Dene Forest Sketches
1888	Beyond Cloudland
1890	A Love Picture in Three Strokes
1892	By the Light of the Nursery Lamp. To Storyland
1894	Conscience Makes the Martyr
