= Flaxley Abbey =

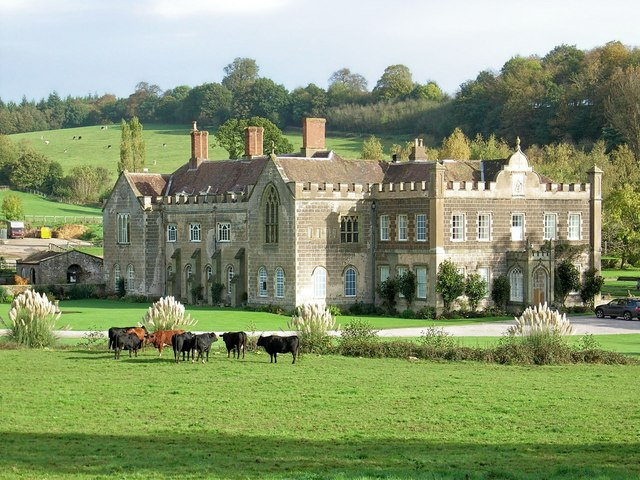
- The grounds of Flaxley Abbey

- Location within Gloucestershire
- Former names: Dene Abbey

General information
- Status: Grade I listed
- Type: Stately home
- Location: Gloucestershire, Flaxley, UK
- Coordinates: 51°50′10″N 02°27′07″W
- Construction started: 30 September 1151
- Completed: 1154

Design and construction
- Architect: Redesign Anthony Keck.
- Other designers: Interior Design Oliver Messel.

Flaxley Abbey is a former Cistercian monastery in England, now a Grade I listed English country house and private residence, near the village of Flaxley in the Forest of Dean, Gloucestershire. It is the former seat of the Crawley-Boevey Baronets.

== History ==
=== Foundation and background ===
Flaxley Abbey was founded in 1151 by Roger Fitzmiles, 2nd Earl of Hereford as a Cistercian monastery. It was allegedly founded on the spot where his father, Miles of Gloucester, 1st Earl of Hereford, was killed while hunting in the Forest of Dean in 1143. The monks who built the abbey came from Bordesley Abbey founded in Worcestershire in 1138. In the late 12th century, it was noted that Pope Celestine III and Pope Alexander III granted the monks of Flaxley Abbey special immunity from tithes.

The monastery came under royal protection during the reign of King Henry II and was used as a royal hunting quarters. In 1227 King Henry III gave a grant to Flaxley Abbey to the woods, called Abbot's Woods. King Edward III, who paid frequent visits to Flaxley Abbey, granted to Flaxley Abbey income from the rents and profits of the lands of the Forest of Dean in 1353.

=== Dissolution ===
Flaxley Abbey was eventually dissolved during the Dissolution of the Monasteries on 4 September 1536. On 21 March 1537 the abbey and its lands were granted to Sir William Kingston, Constable of the Tower of London during much of the reign of Henry VIII, who superintended the execution of Queen Anne Boleyn. During this time the west and south wings of the abbey were converted into a manor house.

== The Crawley-Boevey family ==
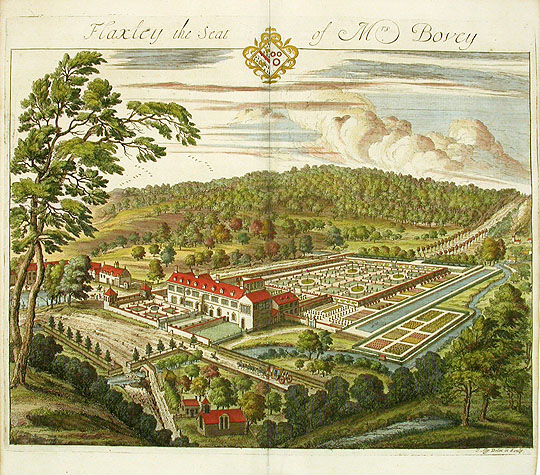
"Flaxley the seat of Mrs Bovey", Flaxley Abbey, 1712 engraving by Johannes Kip.

Flaxley Abbey was purchased in 1648 by the London merchant, lawyer and philosopher James Boevey (1622–1696), with his half-brother William. It subsequently passed to Catherina Boevey, following her brief marriage to William Boevey (James Boevey's son). She bequeathed the house to Thomas Crawley (later styled Crawley-Boevey) on her death in 1727.

The family succeeded by special remainder to the Crawley-Boevey baronetcy (created in 1784 for Sir Charles Barrow, 1st Baronet who died 1789). During this time the house was substantially rebuilt by the designs of architect Anthony Keck. As baronets the manor and the estate continued to pass down from father to eldest son. Flaxley Abbey remained as the family home until 1960.

== Gardens and landscape ==
After the death of William Boevey, his wife Catherina Boevey completed Dutch-style gardens on the grounds of Flaxley Abbey. It is said that Maynard I Colchester, a close friend of Catherina, was influenced by her own canal gardens for his Westbury Court Garden. The layout of the gardens and improvements to Flaxley Abbey were continued by her after her husband's death. However, due to the modification of the land, the Dutch-style gardens at Flaxley Abbey were eventually removed. Between 1962 and 1963 a new modern style garden as well as the manor's interior were redesigned by Oliver Messel.

== Notable visitors ==
- King John of England Itinerary of King John.
- Henry III of England
- King Edward III
- Queen Mary in 1945.

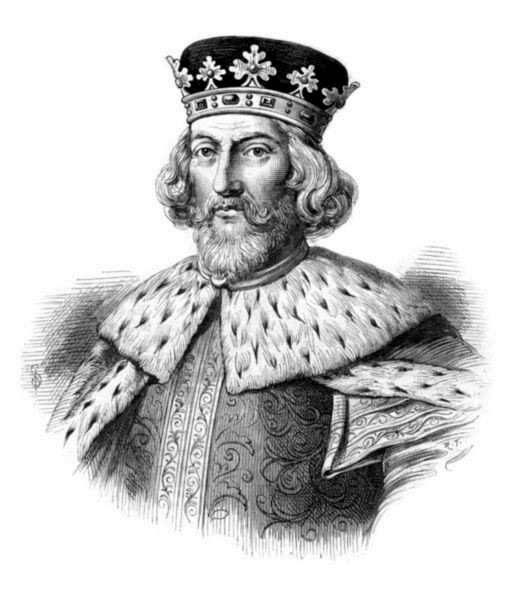
King John of England

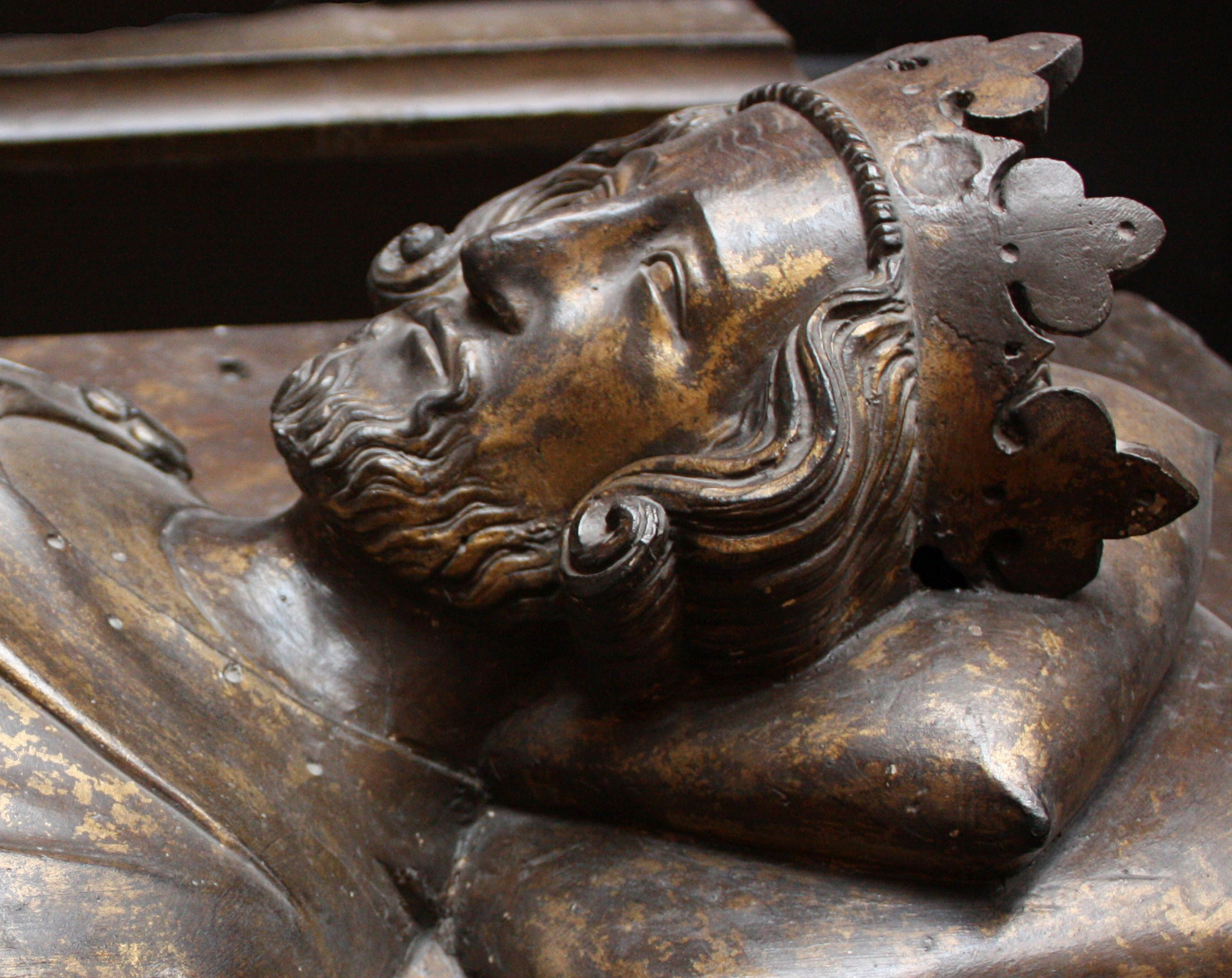
Henry III of England

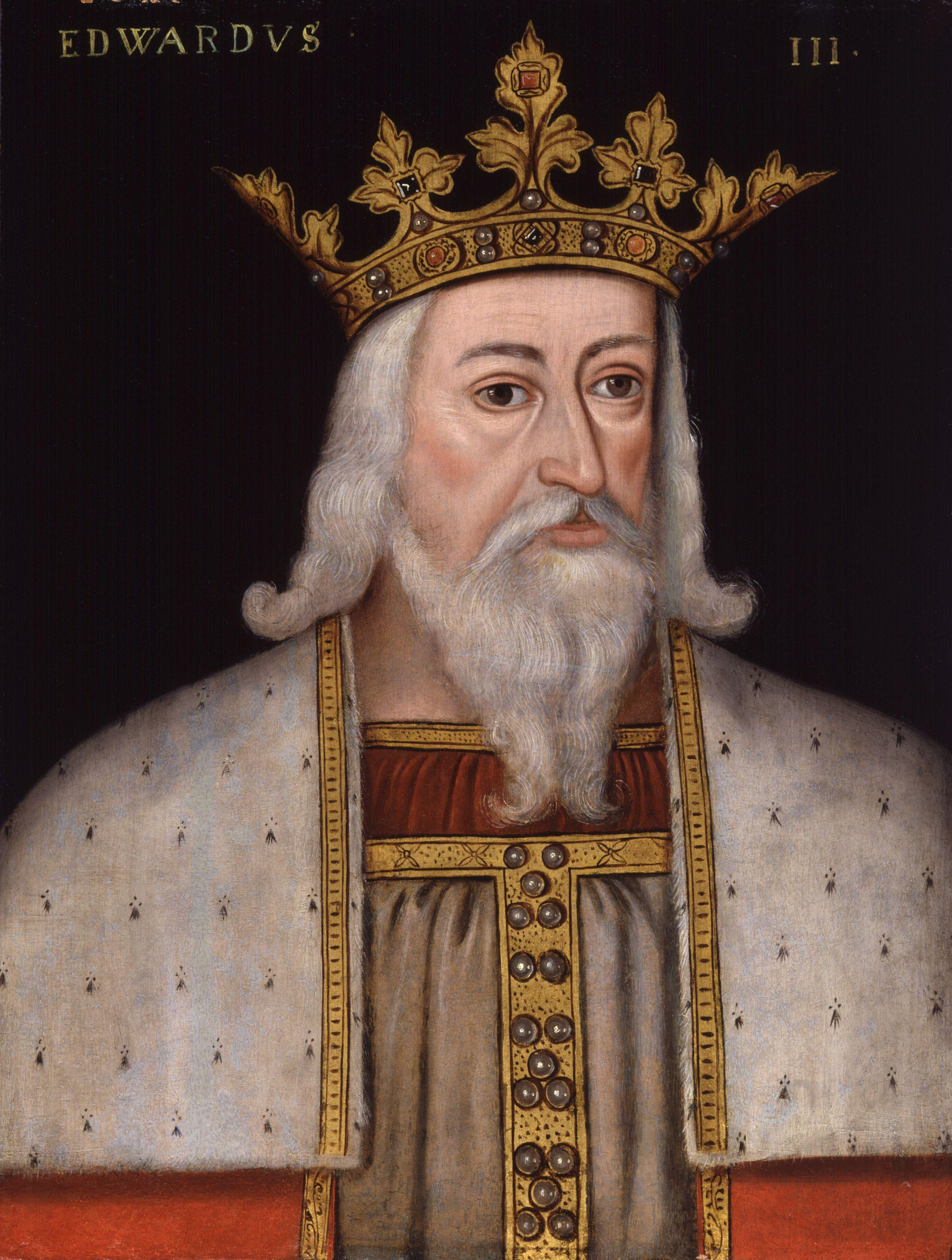
King Edward III of England

Queen Mary

== Notable residents ==
- Matilda Blanche Crawley-Boevey, wife of Victorian businessman William Gibbs of Tyntesfield and daughter of Sir Thomas Crawley-Boevey, 3rd Baronet.
- Arthur William Crawley-Boevey, author, Acting Chief Presidency Magistrate of Bombay, married a daughter of Colonel Robert Phayre in 1883. Service in India from 1868 to 1893. Author of The Cartulary and Historical Notes of the Cistercian Abbey of Flaxley (1887). Son of Sir Martin Hyde Crawley-Boevey, 4th Baronet.
- Sybella Mary Crawley-Boevey, author of Dene Forest Sketches (1888), Beyond Cloudland (1888) and Conscience Makes the Martyr (1894). Daughter of the 4th Baronet.
