= Arthur William Crawley Boevey =

Arthur William Crawley-Boevey
- Appointed by: Donald Mackay, 11th Lord Reay

Acting Chief Presidency Magistrate of Bombay
- Incumbent
- Assumed office 1887

Indian Civil Service
- In office 1868–1893

Personal details
- Born: 12 August 1845 London, UK
- Died: 8 July 1913 London, UK
- Spouse: Anna Maria Phayre
- Education: Oxford University, Oxford UK
- Occupation: Author, Barrister, Civil Servant

Arthur William (A. W.) Crawley-Boevey was a British author, barrister and civil servant, born on 12 August 1845 in London, UK. As an author, he is most known for his works on preservation of buildings and archeological sites in the British Empire including books on Flaxley Abbey. As a civil servant, he became the Acting Chief Presidency Magistrate of Bombay in 1887.

== Career ==
Graduating from Oxford University with a Master of Arts, he became a practicing barrister with the Indian Civil Service between 1868 and 1893. During his time with the civil service held various magistrate and administrative positions in Rewa Kantha, Gujarat and Baroda. In 1887 he was appointed Acting Chief Presidency Magistrate of Bombay under Lord Reay. He later became a Fellow at Bombay University, Bombay, India.

== Works as an author ==
Crawley-Boevey published The Cartulary And Historical Notes Of The Cistercian Abbey Of Flaxley: Otherwise Called Dene Abbey in 1887. This is a collection of the records to titles, and history of the monastery and later Grade I estate of Flaxley Abbey. This book is considered to be culturally important as it is one of the rare cartularies of a religious abbey and manor house printed in the 19th century.

Other works by Crawley-Boevey include A Scheme for the Protection and Conservation of Antient Buildings in and Around the City of Ahmedabad and The Jerusalem Garden Tomb.

== Family ==
Arthur William was the son of Sir Martin Hyde Crawley-Boevey, 4th Baronet of Flaxley Abbey and Elizabeth Daubeny. He married Anna Maria Phayre, daughter of Robert Phayre. They had one son, Major Martin Crawley-Boevey.
