= George Selwyn (politician) =

18th-century British politician

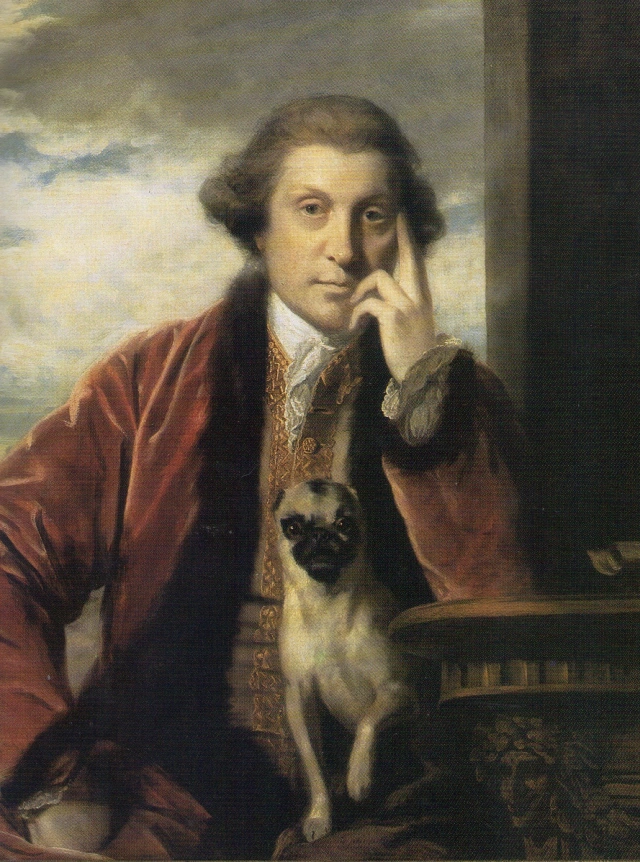
George Augustus Selwyn by Sir Joshua Reynolds

George Augustus Selwyn (11 August 1719 – 25 January 1791) of Matson House, Gloucestershire, was an English Member of Parliament. A renowned eccentric with an affinity for macabre and cross-dressing, he was later described as "a necrophiliac, gay transvestite, [who] sat mute, loved, and undisturbed in the House of Commons for 44 years".

== Origins ==
He was the eldest surviving son of army officer and politician John Selwyn by his wife Mary, a daughter of General Thomas Farrington. He was educated at Eton College and Hart Hall, Oxford (1739), and studied law at the Inner Temple (1737). He was expelled from Oxford in 1745 because he had impiously pretended to impersonate the Saviour and ridiculed the institution of the Blessed Sacrament, but this did not prevent him from obtaining various lucrative sinecures from the administration nor from sitting and sleeping in the House of Commons from 1740 to 1780.

== Political career ==
Selwyn spent 44 years in the House of Commons without having made a speech. As the patron of several rotten boroughs, including both seats at Ludgershall and one in Gloucester, he put his electoral interests at the disposal of the King's ministers, and received in return three lucrative sinecure offices and a pension, which offset his gambling debts. He himself served as one of the MPs for Ludgershall from 1747 to 1754 and for the constituency of Gloucester from 1754 to 1780. After he lost his patronage in Gloucester, Selwyn served again as a Member for Ludgershall from 1780 until his death in 1791. He served as Mayor of Gloucester twice, for 1758 and 1765.

He was also elected for the Scottish constituency of Wigtown Burghs in 1768, when he thought he might be defeated at Gloucester, becoming the first Englishman to be elected to Parliament by a constituency in Scotland. He chose to retain the English seat.

== Personal life ==
Selwyn never married and was known for a fascination with death, corpses, and executions. According to the Whartons: 'With a thorough enjoyment of the pleasures of society, an imperturbable good humour, a kind heart, and a passionate fondness for children, he united a morbid interest in the details of human suffering, and, more especially, a taste for witnessing criminal executions. Not only was he a constant frequenter of such scenes of horror, but all the details of the crime, the private history of the criminal, his demeanour at his trial, in the dungeon, and on the scaffold, and the state of his feelings in the hour of death and degradation, were to Selwyn matters of the deepest and most extraordinary interest. Even the most frightful particulars relating to suicide and murder; the investigation of the disfigured corpse, the sight of an acquaintance lying in his shroud, seem to have afforded him a painful and unaccountable pleasure.'"

He was known for his fascination with the macabre, and was a keen observer of public executions. When attempting to visit the dying Henry Fox, the latter quipped "If Mr Selwyn calls again, show him up; if I am alive I shall be glad to see him and if I am dead I am sure he will be delighted to see me". He was a member of the Hellfire Club and was a friend of Horace Walpole and Etheldreda Townshend.

== Adopted daughter ==
He adopted as his daughter Maria Emilia Fagnani, who married Francis Seymour-Conway, 3rd Marquess of Hertford. She was reputedly the illegitimate daughter of William Douglas, 4th Duke of Queensberry by his mistress Costanza Brusati, the wife of Italian nobleman Giacomo II Fagnani, 4th Marchese di Gerenzano (1740–1785). He constructed for her use a Roman Catholic chapel in the attic of Matson House, which survives. Maria became one of the wealthiest heiresses in Britain, having inherited not only Selwyn's estate, but also a large part of the fortune of her natural father, the Duke of Queensberry, one of the richest men in Britain at the time.

== Death and burial ==
He died unmarried in 1791 and was buried in the Selwyn vault at St Katherine's Church in Matson on 6 February 1791. The vault has since been filled in and the brass plate from his coffin is now affixed on a wall inside the church.

== Portraits ==
- George Augustus Selwyn and Frederick Howard, 5th Earl of Carlisle (c. 1770) by Sir Joshua Reynolds; in the possession of the Earl of Carlisle at Castle Howard
- George Augustus Selwyn at the age of fifty-one by Hugh Douglas Hamilton, a pastelle drawn in 1770; also in the possession of the Earl of Carlisle at Castle Howard
- George Augustus Selwyn (1776) by Sir Joshua Reynolds; displayed at the Tate Gallery between 26 May and 18 September 2005 as part of the exhibition Joshua Reynolds: The Creation of Celebrity
- The "Out of Town" Party (c. 1759) by Sir Joshua Reynolds; portrait of George Selwyn, George "Gilly" Williams and Richard "Dick" Edgcumbe, 2nd Baron Edgcumbe is on display at the Bristol Museum & Art Gallery

Parliament of Great Britain
Preceded by Charles Selwyn; Thomas Hayward	Member of Parliament for Ludgershall; 1747–1754; With: Thomas Farrington	Succeeded by Sir John Bland; Thomas Hayward
Preceded by Charles Barrow; Benjamin Bathurst	Member of Parliament for Gloucester; 1754–1780; With: Charles Barrow	Succeeded by Charles Barrow; John Webb
Preceded by Sir Peniston Lamb; Lord George Gordon	Member of Parliament for Ludgershall; 1780–1791; With: Sir Peniston Lamb 1780–1784; Nathaniel Wraxall 1784–1790; Hon. William Assheton Harbord 1790–1791	Succeeded by Hon. William Assheton Harbord; Samuel Smith
