= Sir Charles Barrow, 1st Baronet =

English politician

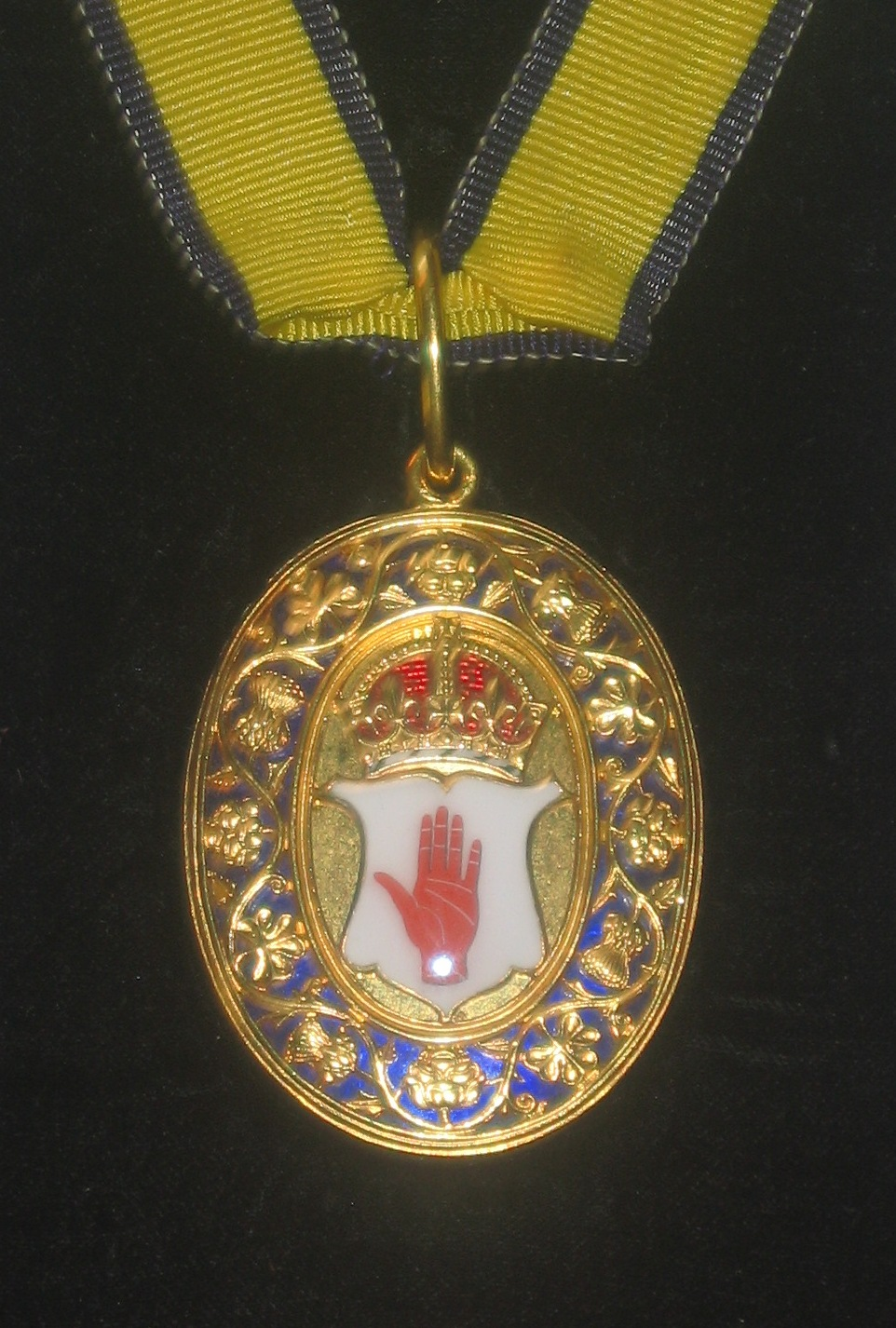
Badge displayed on its own by Baronets of the United Kingdom (Red Hand of Ulster

Sir Charles Barrow, 1st Baronet (1707–1789), of Hygrove, Minsterworth, Gloucestershire, was an English politician.

== Biography ==
Barrow was born in 1708 at Saint Christopher in the West Indies and was the son of merchant Charles Barrow and Elizabeth Harris. He graduated from Oxford University, in 1754 with a Doctor of Civil Law (D.C.L.).

He held the office of Recorder of Tewkesbury and the office of Member of Parliament (MP) for Gloucester November 1751 and 1789. He was created 1st Baronet Barrow, of Highgrove in the County of Gloucester on 22 January 1784, with a special remainder to Thomas Crawley-Boevey of Flaxley Abbey, husband of his first cousin, once removed.

He lived at Hygrove (Highgrove), Minsterworth, Gloucestershire. He married Mary Randall, the daughter of Daniel Randall of Gloucester and had an illegitimate daughter named Mary Caroline Barrow. The Barrow baronetcy passed to Thomas Crawley-Boevey, husband of his brother's granddaughter.

Parliament of Great Britain
Preceded by John Selwyn; Benjamin Bathurst	Member of Parliament for Gloucester; 1751–1789; With: Benjamin Bathurst to 1754; George Augustus Selwyn 1754–1780; John Webb from 1780	Succeeded by John Webb; John Pitt
Baronetage of Great Britain
New creation	Baronet (of Hygrove, Minsterworth); 1784–1789	Succeeded by Thomas Crawley-Boevey
