= Charles Selwyn =

English politician

Charles Selwyn (1689 - 9 June 1749) of West Sheen, Surrey, was an English politician who sat in the House of Commons between 1722 and 1747.

Selwyn was a younger son of Lt.-Gen. William Selwyn, MP, of Matson, Gloucestershire and his wife Albinia Bettenson, daughter of Richard Bettenson of Scadbury, Kent. His father died in 1702 while Governor of Jamaica. Selwyn was commissioned into the Army as a young child in 1692, rising to the rank of Major. He was then appointed gentleman usher to the Princess of Wales in 1714 and became equerry to the Queen in 1727 on the accession of King George II.

Selwyn was returned unopposed by the government as Member of Parliament (MP) for Mitchell at the 1722 general election. At the 1727 general election, he was involved in a double return at Gloucester but was seated on 16 February 1728. He voted with the Administration on almost all occasions. He did not stand in 1734 but was elected Mayor of Gloucester for 1736. At the 1741 general election, his elder brother John Selwyn put him up for Ludgershall. After his return, his behavior in parliament was often troublesome and insulting and he was described in derogatory terms by Horace Walpole and others. His brother did not put him forward at the 1747 general election.

Selwyn married twice; firstly Mary Cook, the widow of William Houblon and secondly Anna Maria Geddes, the daughter of Thomas Hyde and widow of John Geddes. He died on 9 June 1749, having no children by either wife.

Parliament of Great Britain
Preceded by Nathaniel Blakiston; Robert Molesworth	Member of Parliament for Mitchell; 1722–1727; With: John Hedges	Succeeded by Henry Kelsall; Thomas Farrington
