= Thomas Farrington (died 1758) =

British politician

Thomas Farrington (died 1758) of Chislehurst, Kent, was a British politician who sat in the House of Commons between 1727 and 1754.

Farrington was the only son of Lt.-Gen. Thomas Farrington MP of Chislehurst and his wife Theodosia Betenson, daughter of Richard Betenson. He was connected with the Selwyn family since his mother's sister had married Major-General William Selwyn, MP whose eldest son, his cousin John Selwyn, married Farrington's sister Mary. He succeeded his father in 1712.

Farrington was returned as Member of Parliament for Whitchurch at a by-election on 2 February 1727. At the 1727 general election, he succeeded his cousin Charles Selwyn as MP for Mitchell. He was appointed auditor of the land revenues for Wales in 1733 and although he was re-elected at the required by-election in 1733, he was defeated at the 1734 general election. He next stood for parliament in 1747 when returned for Ludgershall on the interest of his cousin John Selwyn. He voted for the Administration in all recorded occasions. He did not stand in 1754.

Farrington died unmarried on 29 January 1758.

Parliament of Great Britain
Preceded by Thomas Vernon; John Conduitt	Member of Parliament for Whitchurch; 1727; With: John Conduitt	Succeeded by John Selwyn; John Conduitt
Preceded by Charles Selwyn; John Hedges	Member of Parliament for Mitchell; 1727–1734; With: Henry Kelsall	Succeeded by Thomas Watts; Robert Ord
Preceded by Charles Selwyn; Thomas Hayward	Member of Parliament for Ludgershall; 1747–1754; With: George Augustus Selwyn	Succeeded by Sir John Bland; Thomas Hayward
