= John Conduitt =

British landowner and politician

John Conduitt (/ˈkɒnd(j)uɪt/; c. 8 March 1688 – 23 May 1737), of Cranbury Park, Hampshire, was a British landowner and Whig politician. He sat in the House of Commons from 1721 to 1737. He was married to granddaughter of Hannah Ayscough and half-niece of Sir Isaac Newton, whom Conduitt succeeded as Master of the Mint.

== Early life ==
The son of Leonard and Sarah Conduitt, John was baptised at St Paul's, Covent Garden, London, on 8 March 1688. In June 1701 he was admitted to St Peter's College, Westminster School, as a King's scholar. In 1705, while at Westminster, he was elected a Queen's scholar to Trinity College, Cambridge, with three others. He was admitted there in June of that year and matriculated to the University, but did not graduate, staying only two years.

== Career ==
By 1707, based on his own account, he was "travelling" in Holland and Germany. In September 1710, he became judge advocate with the British forces in Portugal. He was a "very pretty gentleman" according to James Brydges. From October 1710, he acted as the Earl of Portmore's secretary when the latter arrived in Portugal (N&Q). During this time, he kept the Earl of Dartmouth informed about the Portuguese court. He returned to London by October 1711 with Lord Portmore. During the following year, he was made a captain in a regiment of the dragoons serving in Portugal, but by September 1713 he had been appointed Deputy Paymaster General to the British forces in Gibraltar. Those posts appear to have been remunerative, and in May 1717 he returned home to England a rich man. In 1720, Conduitt acquired the estate and house at Cranbury Park, near Winchester.

== Parliament and Mint ==
In June 1721, Conduitt was elected, on petition, as a Member of Parliament for Whitchurch, Hampshire, which he represented during the 1720s as a loyal supporter of Robert Walpole's Whig government. Conduitt took an active interest in the running of Isaac Newton's office of Master of the Mint in the latter years of Newton's life, and after Newton's death in March 1727 Conduitt succeeded him to the post.

Isaac Newton having died intestate, Conduitt was appointed by Newton's heirs to serve as executor of Newton's estate. Conduitt collected materials for a life of Newton, some of which he forwarded to Bernard Le Bovier de Fontenelle, who used them to prepare Newton's obituary as a foreign member of the French Academy of Sciences. John Newton, who as his most direct living descendant was heir to Isaac Newton's real estate, had to resort to the Chancery courts to get satisfaction from Conduitt.

By the early 1730s, Conduitt had become a relatively prominent parliamentary speaker, defending the government on a number of issues, including Walpole's maintenance of the Septennial Act. In 1734, he was re-elected to his seat, but chose to represent Southampton. Conduitt, together with fellow MP's Sir John Crosse and George Heathcote, introduced the Witchcraft Act 1735, an enlightened piece of legislation that abolished the death penalty for witchcraft. The Act marked the definitive end of witch-hunting in Great Britain, introducing instead a maximum penalty of one year's imprisonment for pretending to exercise magical powers.

== Personal life ==
Shortly after his arrival back in England, he became acquainted with Sir Isaac Newton and his half-niece Catherine Barton. After what must have been a whirlwind romance, they applied to the Faculty Office for a licence, which was granted on 23 August 1717, to marry at St Paul's, Covent Garden. Catherine, then aged 38 years, described herself as 32 years old, Conduitt more correctly as about 30. Despite the licence, they instead married three days later on 26 August in her uncle's parish in the Russell Court Chapel in the parish of St Martin-in-the-Fields. Perhaps in an effort to dignify himself for his impending marriage to one of London's famous daughters, Conduitt obtained for himself a grant of arms from the College of Heralds on 16 August.

The couple had one daughter, named after her mother, born 23 May 1721 and baptised in the same parish of St Martin's on 8 June. Partly as a result of his antiquarian interests, Conduitt was elected a Fellow of the Royal Society on 1 December 1718, proposed by the president, and his uncle by marriage, Sir Isaac Newton. Sir Isaac Newton took up residence at Cranbury towards the end of his life, with his niece and her husband until his death in 1727.

== Death and descendants ==
Conduitt died on 23 May 1737 at age 49, and was buried on 29 May in Westminster Abbey, next to Sir Isaac Newton. His wife Catherine died in 1739 and was buried with him. In his will, dated 1732, he had left his estate to his wife and made her guardian of their underage daughter Catherine. Upon his death, the trustees sold the estate at Cranbury Park as well as estates at Weston and Netley, near Southampton, to Thomas Lee Dummer, who succeeded Conduitt as MP for Southampton.

In 1740 his daughter Catherine married John Wallop, Viscount Lymington, the eldest son of the Earl of Portsmouth. Catherine's son John Wallop succeeded his grandfather to the peerage.

Government offices
Preceded by Sir Isaac Newton	Master of the Mint; 1727–1737	Succeeded by Richard Arundell
Parliament of Great Britain
Preceded by George Carpenter; Frederick Tylney	Member of Parliament for Whitchurch; 1721–1735; With: George Carpenter 1721–1722; Thomas Vernon 1722–1727; Thomas Farrington 1727; John Selwyn 1727–1734; John Selwyn, Jr 1734–1735	Succeeded by John Selwyn, Jr; John Mordaunt
Preceded by Anthony Henley	Member of Parliament for Southampton; 1734–1737; With: Sir William Heathcote	Succeeded by Thomas Lee Dummer
