= John Selwyn (1688–1751) =

British Army officer, courtier and politician

- Born: 20 August 1688
- Died: 5 November 1751 (aged 63)
- Occupation: English politician
- Known for: Member of Parliament for Truro; Whitchurch; Gloucester
- Children: 3, including John and George

Colonel John Selwyn (20 August 1688 – 5 November 1751) of Matson, Gloucestershire, a British Army officer, courtier and politician, sat in the House of Commons between 1715 and 1751.

Selwyn was the eldest son of Lieutenant-general William Selwyn, MP of Matson, Gloucestershire. He was commissioned into the Army in his infancy as ensign and lieutenant of the 3rd Foot Guards on 31 December 1688. His father died in 1702 whilst Governor of Jamaica and he inherited the Matson estate. He became captain and lieutenant-colonel in the 1st Foot Guards in 1707 and served in Flanders as aide-de-camp to the Duke of Marlborough. By 1709, he married Mary Farrington, the daughter of Lieutenant-general Thomas Farrington MP of Chislehurst. He rose to the rank of Colonel of the 3rd Regiment of Foot in 1711 until 1713.

Selwyn was returned unopposed as Member of Parliament (MP) for Truro on the Boscawen interest at the 1715 general election. He was also appointed Commissioner of the Equivalent in 1715. He was appointed clerk of the household to Prince of Wales in 1716 through the influence of Lord Townshend. In 1717, he followed Lord Townsend into opposition and lost his Commissioner post. He was promoted to Groom of the Bedchamber to the Prince of Wales in 1718. After the Whigs came together again in 1720, he was appointed to the post of Receiver General and comptroller of customs, but had to give up his seat in the House of Commons in February 1721 and did not stand in 1722.

In 1726 Selwyn acquired property at Whitchurch which gave him a seat in Parliament. He was Mayor of Gloucester in 1727 and after passing the Receivership to his brother, returned himself as MP for Whitchurch at the 1727 general election. After the Prince of Wales became King George II in 1727, Selwyn continued as Groom of the Bedchamber until 1730, when he became treasurer of the Queen's Household. As such he was accountable for payments from the Treasury to support Richmond Lodge and the households of the Duke of Cumberland, the Princesses Amelia and Caroline, and the Princesses Mary and Louise, children of the King and Queen.

He was a member of the gaols committee of the House of Commons in the year 1729 to 1730. In 1733 he bought the manor of Ludgershall, which gave him electoral influence at Gloucester. He was Mayor of Gloucester again in 1734 and was elected in a contest as MP for Gloucester at the 1734 general election. He spoke for the new colony of Georgia in a debate on the army estimates on 3 February 1738 and voted regularly with the Government. He was re-elected MP for Gloucester at the 1741 general election. He was appointed paymaster of marines in 1746 but, to avoid a by-election, did not take up the post until the 1747 general election when he was returned unopposed. However the post ceased to exist when the Marines were disbanded in 1748. He was appointed treasurer to the Prince of Wales in May 1751.

Selwyn died on 5 November 1751. He had two sons and a daughter, but was predeceased by his elder son John. His estate went to his second son George Augustus Selwyn.

Parliament of Great Britain
Preceded by Thomas Hare; William Collier	Member of Parliament for Truro; 1715–1721; With: Spencer Cowper	Succeeded by Spencer Cowper; Thomas Wyndham
Preceded by John Conduitt; Thomas Farrington	Member of Parliament for Whitchurch; 1727–1734; With: John Conduitt	Succeeded by John Conduitt; John Selwyn
Preceded by Benjamin Bathurst; Charles Selwyn	Member of Parliament for Gloucester; 1734–1751; With: Benjamin Bathurst	Succeeded by Benjamin Bathurst; Charles Barrow
Military offices
New regiment	Colonel of John Selwyn's Regiment of Foot; 1709–1711	Succeeded by Richard Lucas
Preceded by The Duke of Argyll	Colonel of Prince George of Denmark's Regiment; 1711–1713	Succeeded by The Earl of Forfar
