= Crawley-Boevey baronets =

Title in the Baronetage of Great Britain

The Barrow, later Crawley-Boevey baronetcy (Boevey is pronounced "Boovey"), of Highgrove (Hygrove House, Minsterworth) in the County of Gloucester, is a title in the Baronetage of Great Britain. It was created on 22 January 1784 for Charles Barrow, Member of Parliament for Gloucester from 1751 to 1789, with a special remainder.

Under the special remainder Thomas Crawley-Boevey succeeded as second Baronet; he was the husband of Ann, granddaughter of Thomas Barrow, brother of the 1st Baronet. He was succeeded by his eldest son, the 3rd Baronet, High Sheriff of Gloucestershire from 1831 to 1832. The 5th Baronet was High Sheriff of Gloucestershire in 1882.

== Barrow, later Crawley-Boevey baronets, of Highgrove (1784) ==
Sir Martin Hyde Crawley-Boevey 4th Baronet (1812–1862)

- Sir Charles Barrow, 1st Baronet (1708–1789)
- Sir Thomas Crawley-Boevey, 2nd Baronet (1744–1818)
- Sir Thomas Crawley-Boevey, 3rd Baronet (1769–1847)
- Sir Martin Hyde Crawley-Boevey, 4th Baronet (1812–1862)
- Sir Thomas Hyde Crawley-Boevey, 5th Baronet (1837–1912)
- Sir Francis Hyde Crawley-Boevey, 6th Baronet (1868–1928)
- Sir Launcelot Valentine Hyde Crawley-Boevey, 7th Baronet (1900–1968)
- Sir Thomas Michael Blake Crawley-Boevey, 8th Baronet (1928–2021)
- Sir Thomas Hyde Crawley-Boevey, 9th Baronet (born 1958)

The heir apparent is the current holder's elder son, James Ian Crawley-Boevey (born 1992).

== Notes ==
Baronetage of Great Britain
Preceded by Hamond baronets	Barrow baronets of Highgrove; 22 January 1784	Succeeded by Morshead baronets
