= Josh Allen (disambiguation) =

Josh Allen (born 1996) is an American football quarterback in the NFL, who has played for the Buffalo Bills since 2018.

Josh or Joshua Allen may also refer to:

- Joshua Allen, 2nd Viscount Allen (1685–1742), Irish peer and politician
- Joshua Allen, 5th Viscount Allen (1728–1816), Irish peer, cousin of the above
- Joshua Allen, 6th Viscount Allen (c. 1782–1845), Irish peer and dandy, son of the above
- Joshua Allen (dancer) (1989–2025), American dancer and winner of the fourth season of So You Think You Can Dance
- Josh Allen (offensive lineman) (born 1991), American football player
- Josh Hines-Allen (born Joshua Allen, 1997), American football defensive end in the NFL for the Jacksonville Jaguars

== See also ==
- William J. Allen (William Joshua Allen, 1829–1901), United States Representative from Illinois during the Civil War and United States District Judge
- Joshua Alan (born 1984), American singer-songwriter and musician
