= 1823 in architecture =

The year 1823 in architecture involved some significant events.

== Buildings and structures ==
=== Buildings ===
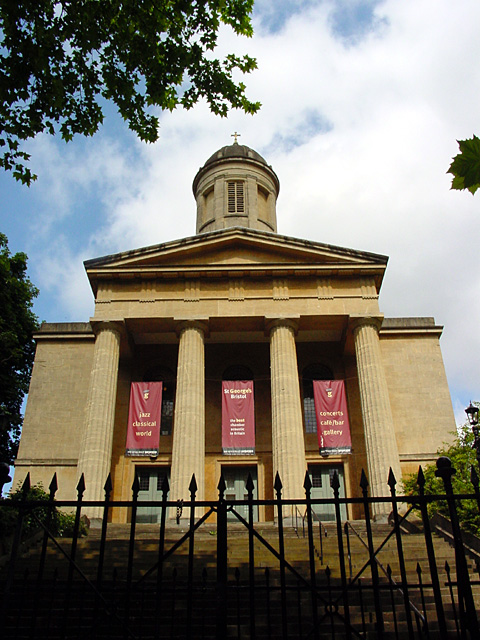
St George's, Brandon Hill, Bristol

- Work begins on the British Museum in London, designed by Robert Smirke (later Sir Robert).
- Work begins on the Altes Museum in Berlin, designed by Karl Friedrich Schinkel, which is completed in 1830.
- Work completed on St George's Church, Brandon Hill in Bristol, England, designed by Robert Smirke in Greek Revival style.
- Work completed on the Primary Cathedral of Bogotá, Colombia.
- Work completed on the Admiralty building, Saint Petersburg designed by Andreyan Zakharov in 1806.
- Work completed on the core of Massachusetts General Hospital, Bulfinch Building, designed by Charles Bulfinch.
- Opening of Horton Road Hospital as the First Gloucestershire County Asylum in England, designed by William Stark, John Wheeler and John Collingwood.
- William Strickland builds St. Stephen's Episcopal Church, Philadelphia, United States, one of the first Gothic Revival buildings.

== Events ==
- July 15–16 – A fire destroys the Basilica of Saint Paul Outside the Walls in Rome.

== Awards ==
- Grand Prix de Rome, architecture: Félix Duban.

== Births ==
- March 8 – Thomas Fuller, Canadian architect (died 1898)
- July 7 – Francis Fowke, Anglo-Irish architect and military engineer (died 1865)
- July 23 – Edwin May, American architect working in Indianapolis (died 1880)
- August 18 – John Thomas Emmett, English architect (died 1898)
- September 21 – Charles Barry, Jr., English architect (died 1900)

== Deaths ==
- June 16 – Archibald Elliot, Scottish architect (born 1761)
- August 16 – Louis-Martin Berthault, French architect (born 1770)
- Edward Holl, English architect to the Navy Board
