= Peter Bathurst =

Peter Bathurst may refer to:

- Peter Bathurst (Salisbury MP) (1687–1748), member of parliament for Wilton, for Cirencester, and for Salisbury
- Peter Bathurst (Eye MP) (1723–1801), member of parliament for Eye
