= John Coxe (MP) =

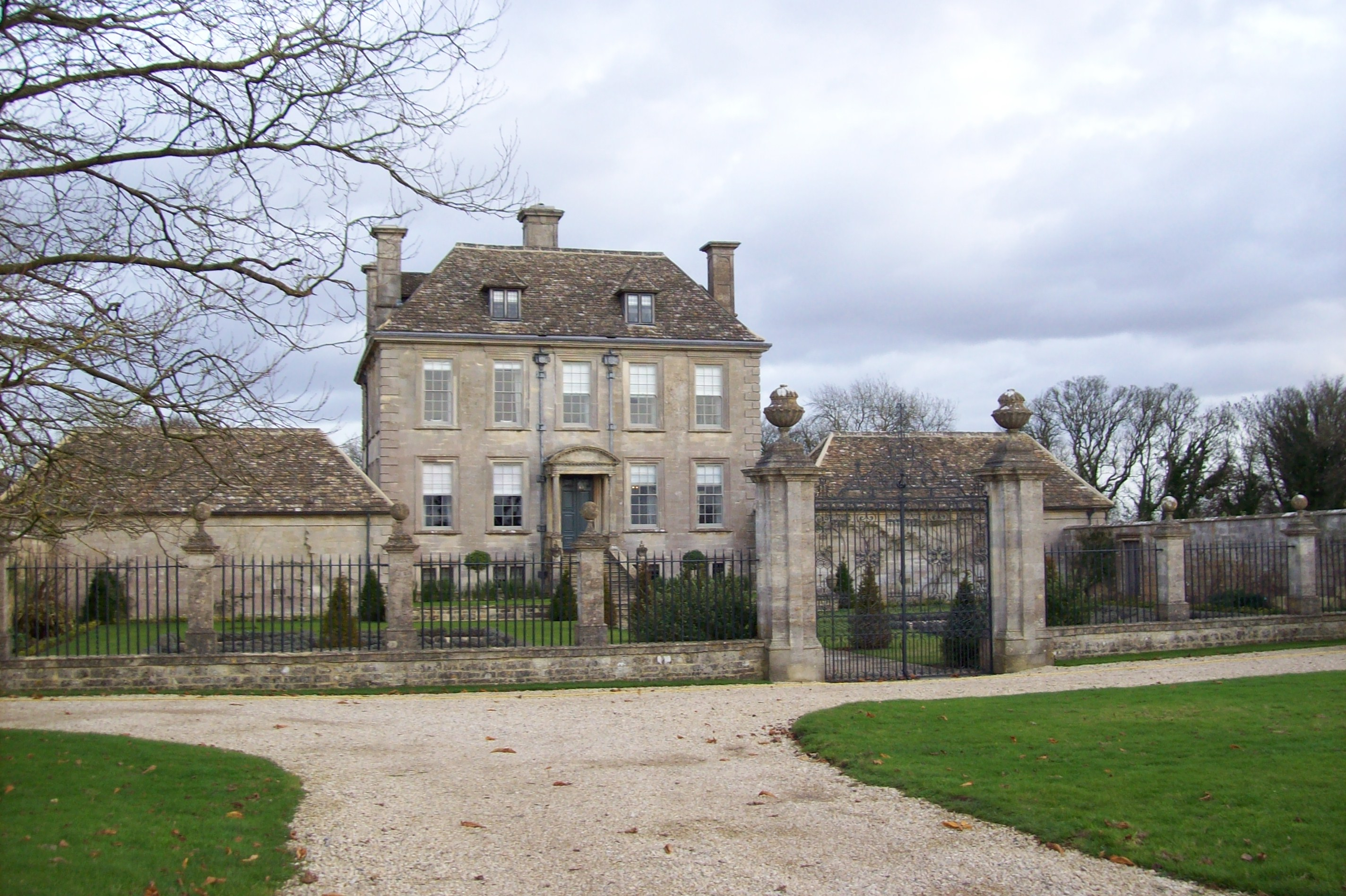
Nether Lypiatt Manor House

John Coxe (c. 1695 – 27 Jan 1783) of Nether Lypiatt, Gloucestershire was an English landowner and Member of Parliament.

He was the eldest son of Charles Coxe, lawyer and Member of Parliament and was educated at Magdalen College, Oxford (1712) and then studied law at Lincoln's Inn, where he was called to the bar in 1718 and made a bencher in 1743.

On the death of his father in 1728 he inherited the "manor" of Nether Lypiatt with the house his father had built and the position of Clerk of the letters patent, a post he held until his own death.

In 1749 he was elected Member of Parliament for Cirencester in a by-election following the death of Thomas Master.

He married sometime before 1728, Theodora, the daughter of Thomas Eyre of Huntercombe, Burnham, Buckinghamshire and had a son and heir.

Parliament of Great Britain
Preceded by Thomas Master; Henry Bathurst	Member of Parliament for Cirencester; 1747–1749; With: Henry Bathurst	Succeeded by Hon. Benjamin Bathurst; Hon. John Dawnay
