= Benjamin Bathurst (MP for Gloucester) =

English politician (1692–1767)

- Born: 1692
- Died: November 5, 1767
- Education: Eton College; Trinity College, Oxford
- Spouses: Finetta Poole (1714–1738); Catherine Whitfield (1741–?)
- Children: 36
- Parents: Benjamin Bathurst (1635–1704) (father); Frances Apsley (mother)
- Relatives: Allen Bathurst, 1st Baron Bathurst (brother); Peter Bathurst (brother)

Benjamin Bathurst FRS (1692– 5 November 1767) of Lydney, Gloucestershire, was an English politician who sat in the House of Commons for 54 years from 1713 to 1767.

Bathurst was a younger son of Sir Benjamin Bathurst, MP and his wife Frances Apsley, daughter of Sir Allen Apsley. His father was heavily involved in the slave trade through the Royal African Company and the East India Company. Bathurst was himself a supporter of the slave trade, in his position as MP. He was educated at Eton College in 1699 and matriculated at Trinity College, Oxford 30 June 1708, aged 16. He inherited the estates at Lydney, Gloucestershire and Mixbury, Oxfordshire on the death of his father in 1704.

Bathurst was returned as Member of Parliament (MP) for Cirencester on the family interest at the 1713 British general election He was returned again in 1715 and 1722. At the 1727 British general election, he transferred to Gloucester where he was caught up in a double return. He was declared elected as MP on 16 February 1728. He was returned again in 1734, 1741 and 1747. At the 1754 general election he was returned as MP for Monmouth Boroughs on the interest of the Duke of Beaufort, and was returned again in 1761. He was appointed Outranger of Windsor Forest in 1763 which he held for the rest of his life. There is no record of his ever having spoken in Parliament in all the years he was a member

Bathurst married Finetta Poole, the daughter of Henry Poole of Kemble, Gloucestershire in 1714, and with her had 22 children. She died on 27 February 1738 and he married as his second wife, on 22 October 1741, Catherine Whitfield, widow of Dr. William Whitfield and daughter of the Rev. Lawrence Brodrick, chaplain to the House of Commons. With her he had a further 14 children. He became a Fellow of the Royal Society on 9 December 1731.

Bathurst died on 5 November 1767. He was the brother of Allen Bathurst, 1st Baron Bathurst and Peter Bathurst.

Parliament of Great Britain
Preceded by Thomas Master; Charles Coxe	Member of Parliament for Cirencester; 1713–1727; With: Thomas Master	Succeeded by Thomas Master; Peter Bathurst
Preceded by John Howe; Charles Hyett	Member of Parliament for Gloucester; 1727–1754; With: Charles Selwyn to 1734; John Selwyn (1688–1751) 1734–51; Charles Barrow from 1751	Succeeded by Charles Barrow; George Augustus Selwyn
Preceded by Fulke Greville	Member of Parliament for Monmouth Boroughs; 1754–1767	Succeeded by John Stepney
