= John Snell (1682–1726) =

English lawyer and politician

John Snell (1682–13 September 1726), of Gloucester, was an English lawyer and politician who sat in the House of Commons from 1713 to 1726.

Snell was the eldest son of well-to-do Thomas Snell of Gloucester (Mayor of Gloucester in 1699) and his wife Bridget. He was admitted at the Inner Temple in 1700 and called to the bar in 1704. In 1713 he married Anna Maria Huntingdon, the daughter and heiress of Robert Huntington, briefly Bishop of Raphoe, and the niece and heiress of Sir John Powell of Gloucester. Two months later, he inherited the estates of the latter and also bought the manor of Lower Guiting in Gloucestershire.

Snell was elected as a Tory Member (MP) for Gloucester at the 1713 general election. He was re-elected at the general elections of 1715 and 1722. He spoke frequently and voted consistently against the government.

Snell died 13 September 1726 and was buried in the church of St. Mary de Crypt, Gloucester. His estates passed to his (eldest) son, Powell. He also left a daughter.

Parliament of Great Britain
Preceded by Thomas Webb; John Blanch	Member of Parliament for Gloucester; 1713–1726; With: Charles Coxe to 1722; Charles Hyett from 1722	Succeeded by Charles Hyett; John Howe
