= William Cornwallis =

Royal Navy officer and politician (1744–1819)

Admiral The Honourable Sir William Cornwallis GCB
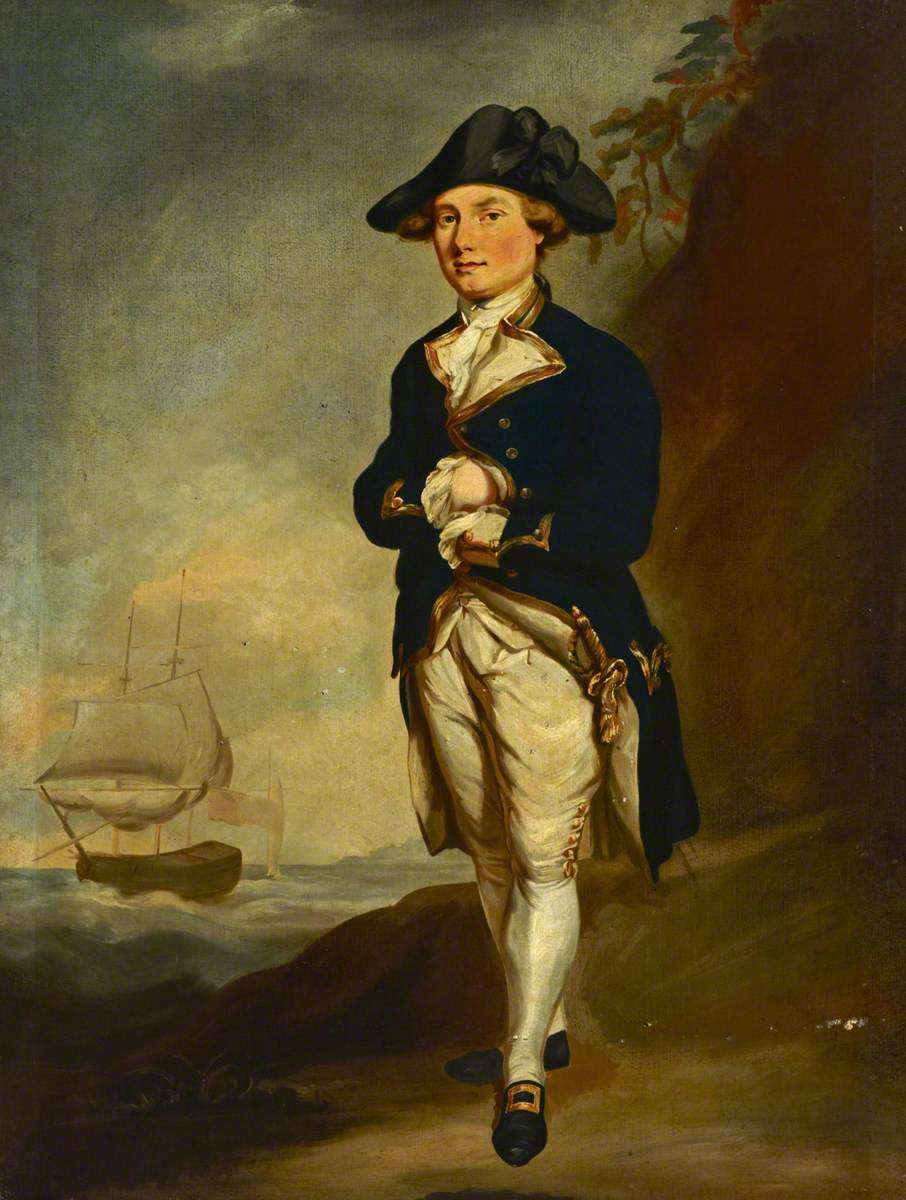
- Portrait by Daniel Gardner, 1790

Member of Parliament for Eye
- In office 1801–1807
- In office 1790–1800
- In office 1782–1784
- In office 1768–1774

Member of Parliament for Portsmouth
- In office 1784–1790

Personal details
- Born: 20 February 1744
- Died: 5 July 1819 (aged 75)
- Relations: Charles Cornwallis, 1st Marquess Cornwallis, Charles Townshend, 2nd Viscount Townshend
- Nickname(s): "Blue Billy" "Coachee", "Billy go tight" and "Mr Whip"

Military service
- Allegiance: Great Britain; United Kingdom
- Branch/service: Royal Navy
- Years of service: 1755–1806
- Rank: Admiral
- Commands: HMS Wasp; HMS Swift; HMS Prince Edward; HMS Guadeloupe; HMS Lion; HMS Canada; HMS Ganges; HMY Charlotte; HMS Robust; HMS Crown; East Indies Station; Channel Fleet
- Battles/wars: Seven Years' War; Siege of Louisbourg; Battle of Quiberon Bay; American War of Independence; Battle of Grenada; Battle of St. Kitts; Battle of the Saintes; Third Anglo-Mysore War; Reduction of Pondicherry; French Revolutionary Wars; First Battle of Groix; Napoleonic Wars

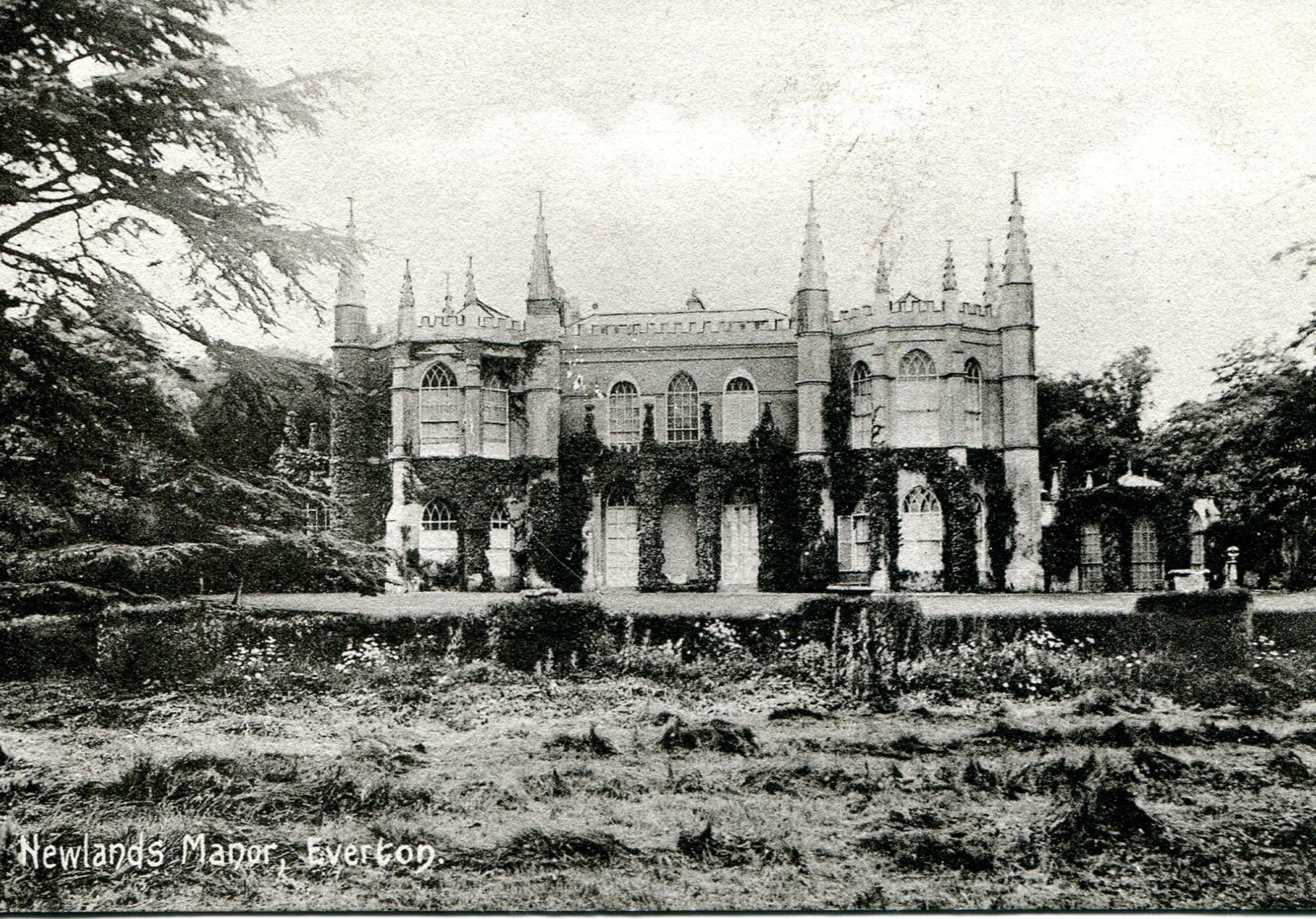
Newlands Manor, Hampshire, Milford, family seat, c. 1900

Admiral Sir William Cornwallis, GCB (20 February 1744 – 5 July 1819) was a Royal Navy officer and politician. Cornwallis took part in a number of decisive battles including the siege of Louisbourg in 1758, when he was 14, and the Battle of the Saintes but is best known as a friend of Lord Nelson and as the commander-in-chief of the Channel Fleet during the Napoleonic Wars. He is depicted in the Horatio Hornblower novel, Hornblower and the Hotspur. His affectionate contemporary nickname from "the ranks" was Billy Blue, and a sea shanty was written during his period of service, reflecting the admiration his men had for him.

== Early life ==
William Cornwallis was born 20 February 1744. His father was Charles, the fifth baron and first earl Cornwallis, and his mother was Elizabeth, daughter of Charles Townshend, 2nd Viscount Townshend. William was the younger brother of General Charles Cornwallis. He went to Eton College in 1753.

== Seven Years' War ==
The young William entered the navy in 1755 aboard the 80-gun HMS Newark bound for North America in the fleet of Admiral Edward Boscawen. Cornwallis was shortly after exchanged into HMS Kingston and was present in her at the siege of Louisbourg in 1758. The siege was one of the pivotal battles of the war. Louisbourg was the only deep water harbour that the French controlled in North America, and its capture enabled the British to launch an attack on Quebec City. General James Wolfe's attack on Quebec and victory at the Battle of the Plains of Abraham saw the beginning of the end of French colonisation in North America.

When Kingston returned to England in 1759, Cornwallis was taken aboard the 60-gun Dunkirk by Captain Robert Digby. During the planned French invasion of Britain in 1759, Dunkirk was with Admiral Edward Hawke's squadron and took part in the Battle of Quiberon Bay against the French fleet under Admiral Conflans. The victory was part of what became known as Annus Mirabilis of 1759 and in concert with the other victories of that year gave the Royal Navy almost complete dominance over the oceans for over a century. The succession of victories led Horace Walpole to remark "our bells are worn threadbare ringing for victories".

Cornwallis remained in Dunkirk when she was assigned to the Mediterranean fleet then commanded by Admiral Charles Saunders. Dunkirk was detached on blockade duty, ensuring the French fleet remained in the city of Heraklion, Crete. Cornwallis moved to Saunders' flagship HMS Neptune where he remained for little over a year. On 5 April 1761, Cornwallis passed his examination for lieutenant and was promoted into the newly commissioned third-rate HMS Thunderer. In July 1761, Cornwallis was with Thunderer and two other line-of-battle ships blockading Cádiz. Two French ships escaped the blockade and the British squadron set off in pursuit. Thunderer caught up with the 64-gun Achille and captured her in a single-ship action that lasted about half an hour. The British lost seventeen killed and one hundred and thirteen wounded.

In July 1762, Cornwallis received his first command in the 8-gun sloop-of-war HMS Wasp. In 1763, he was given command of the more powerful and newly launched 14-gun HMS Swift. He continued in her into the peace with France after the Treaty of Paris had ended the war in 1763. During the peace in 1765, he was promoted post-captain and given command of the 44-gun HMS Prince Edward. He commanded her until she was paid off and the ship was sold in 1766. In September of the same year, he was given command of HMS Guadeloupe and was variously employed throughout the peace between the Seven Years' War and the outbreak of the American Revolutionary War.

== American Revolutionary War ==
When the French lent their official support to the American cause in 1778 with the Treaty of Alliance and the Treaty of Amity and Commerce, the war between Britain and the United States became a global war. Captain Cornwallis was in command of the newly commissioned HMS Lion. Lion was sent, with Admiral John Byron, to the West Indies.

=== Battle of Grenada ===
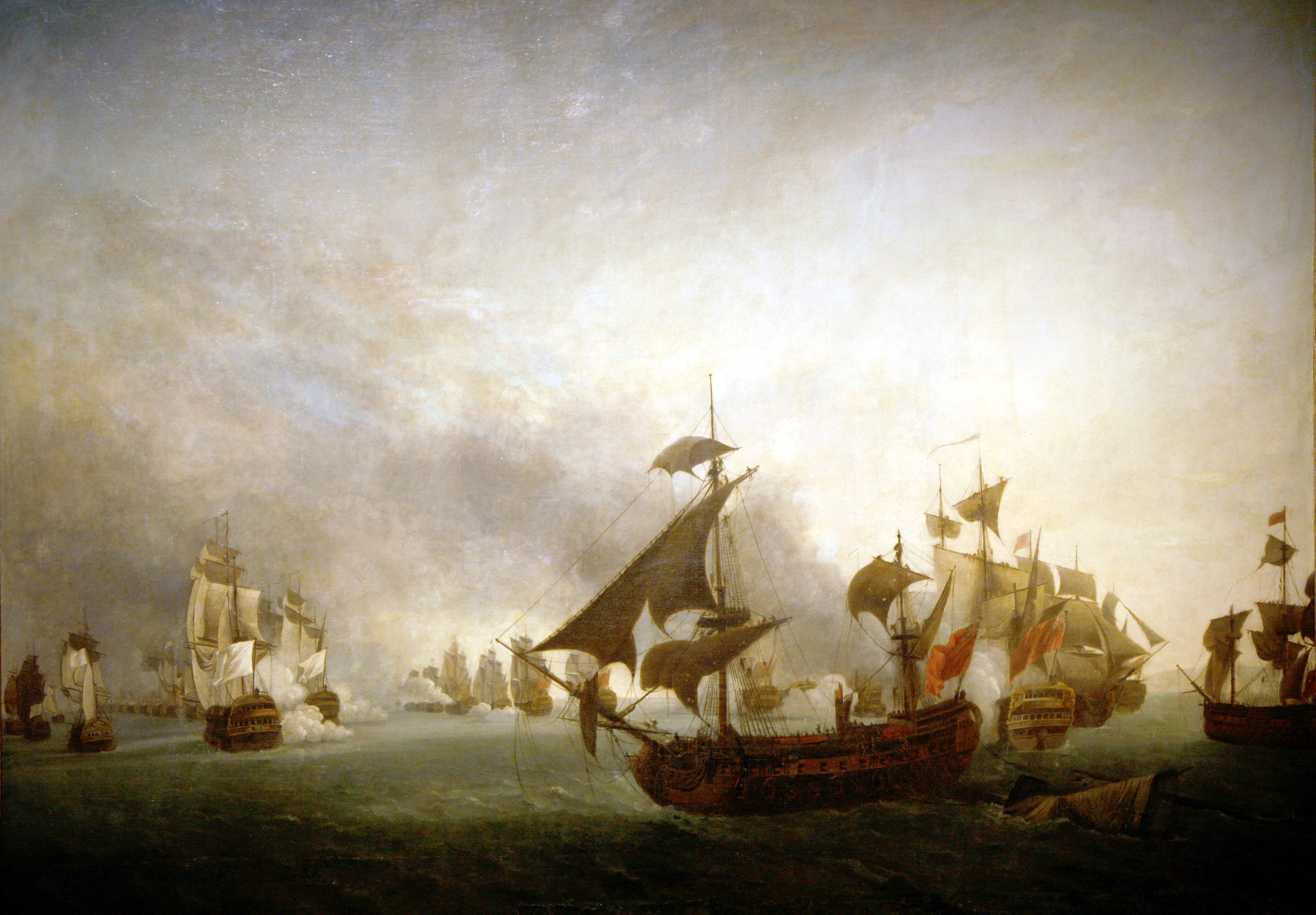
Battle of Grenada 1781 Jean-François Hue

When war was officially declared, the Comte d'Estaing, the French naval commander in North America swiftly captured the islands of Saint Vincent and Grenada. Byron on hearing the news that Saint Vincent had been captured assembled his forces but on his way to recapture the island he received intelligence that d'Estaing and his fleet were in the process of capturing Grenada. Byron consequently took his fleet to Grenada in the hopes of engaging them and preventing the capture of Grenada. The island however had only held out for two days and was already in French hands.

The Battle of Grenada took place on 6 July 1779. d'Estaing saw the British fleet of 21 ships of the line approaching and weighed anchor. Byron gave chase and attempted to form line of battle as per the Sailing and Fighting Instructions set down by Admiral Blake in 1653. d'Estaing, realising that his force although superior in guns was not so in numbers, had ordered his captains not to engage directly but to bear away when British ships approached and to bear down on any individual ship that might through wind or poor seamanship become separated from the line.

This tactic proved successful and d'Estaing's ships managed to escape the superior force causing considerable damage to three of the British ships. Cornwallis' Lion was one of those ships and when he became separated from the British fleet she was forced to break away and make a run for Jamaica rather than risk capture. Lion suffered a reported 21 killed and 30 wounded.

=== Duty in the West Indies ===
During his time in the West Indies, Cornwallis came to own, then later free the "doctoress" Cubah Cornwallis. Cubah became Cornwallis' mistress and housekeeper in Port Royal, Jamaica. Later she treated Cornwallis' friend, Captain Horatio Nelson on his return from the disastrous mission to Nicaragua. She also treated Prince William Henry, later William IV, when he was stationed in the West Indies.

Lion remained on the Jamaica station under the orders of Admiral Peter Parker and when she was repaired began a series of cruises in the West Indies. On 20 April 1780 Cornwallis was in command of a small squadron of two line-of-battle ships, Lion and HMS Bristol and one large 44-gun frigate, HMS Janus.

Off Saint-Domingue the small British squadron discovered a convoy under the protection of four ships-of-the-line and one frigate commanded by Monsieur de la Motte Picquet. The French chased and the British ran. The French outsailed the British ships and when in range opened fire. The chase continued throughout the night and into the morning of the 21st. The breeze died and the two squadrons began to repair their damage. When the wind blew once more the chase renewed and continued throughout the night of the 21st and into the 22nd.

On the morning of the 22nd three sails appeared to leeward. The arrival of these new sails would determine the outcome of the battle. The newcomers proved to be the 64-gun HMS Ruby, the 32-gun HMS Niger and the 28-gun HMS Pomona. The French squadron bore away for Cap-Français, leaving the two small British squadrons to repair and make for Jamaica. The British squadron under Cornwallis had lost 12 killed including Captain Glover of the Janus.

Cornwallis returned to England in Lion in June 1781 and took part in the second relief of Gibraltar. He was appointed to command the 74-gun third-rate HMS Canada, and immediately returned to the West Indies under the orders of Admiral Samuel Hood, 1st Viscount Hood.

Canada was with Hood's fleet at the Battle of St. Kitts in 1782. Hood took his 21 ships of the line and lured the French fleet of 29 ships of the line under the Comte de Grasse from its anchorage at Basseterre on St. Kitts and then sailed into the roadstead and anchored. Hood then repulsed de Grasse's efforts to dislodge the British fleet. The Battle of Brimstone Hill sealed the fate of the island despite Hood's efforts and St. Kitts fell into French hands. With the island in enemy hands and the French fleet cruising off the harbour, Hood was forced to withdraw and made his way to Antigua. Canada in Commodore Edmund Affleck's division suffered 1 killed and 12 wounded. On 22 March Hood joined Admiral George Rodney's fleet in Barbados.

=== Battle of the Saintes ===
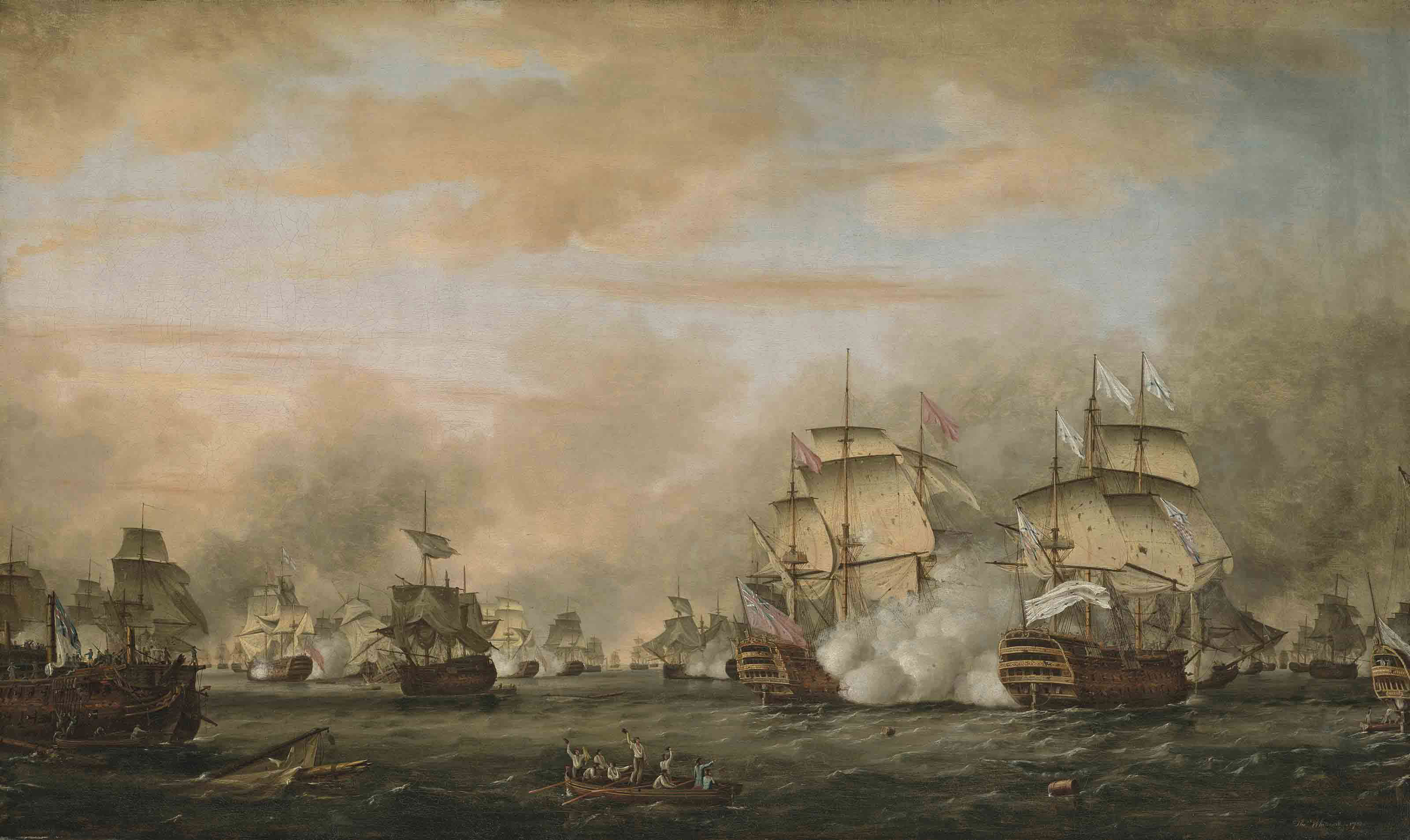
The Battle of the Saintes, 12 April 1782: surrender of the Ville de Paris by Thomas Whitcombe, painted 1783, shows Hood's HMS Barfleur, centre, attacking the French flagship Ville de Paris, right

Between 9 April 1782 and 12 April 1782, Canada made up part of the fleet of Admiral Rodney at the Battle of the Saintes. During the battle, Cornwallis and Canada were fourth in line on the starboard tack in the centre division between HMS Repulse and HMS St Albans. Canada sustained 35 casualties in total with 12 killed and the rest wounded. The outcome of the battle meant that the French and Spanish abandoned their planned invasion of Britain's most valuable Caribbean island, Jamaica. The battle, although a victory for the English caused a great deal of controversy in later years that included Cornwallis' direct criticism in writing of Rodney. The final couplet of the poem said to have been written in Cornwallis' own hand reads:

Had a chief worthy Britain commanded our fleet,
Twenty-five good French ships had been laid at our feet.

It appears that the criticisms of Admiral Hood and Cornwallis went unheard and Rodney was created a baron and given a life pension of £2,000 per year. Cornwallis was sent home under Rear-Admiral Thomas Graves with the convoy that included the captured French flagship Ville de Paris. A violent storm hit the convoy and Ville de Paris sank along with several of the convoy and one of the escorts, HMS Centaur. The convoy and her escorts finally arrived at Portsmouth and Canada was paid off in October 1782.

=== Home service and peace ===
In January 1783 Cornwallis was given command of HMS Ganges and in March of the same year was moved to HM Yacht Charlotte. The American Revolutionary War between Britain and the allied forces of America and France ended with Britain's defeat in September 1783 and the subsequent signing of the Treaty of Paris. With the peace came the downsizing of the navy. Cornwallis however remained employed in command of the royal yacht until 1787. In 1787 he was briefly given command of HMS Robust before hoisting his broad pennant as commodore in the 64-gun HMS Crown in October 1788 when he was appointed commander-in-chief of the East Indies Station.

== Third Anglo-Mysore War ==
In November 1791 Cornwallis ordered that French shipping be intercepted and searched for contraband. The British and French were not at war but the French were openly aiding the Tipu Sultan in his war against the British. Cornwallis detached Captain Richard Strachan in HMS Phoenix to intercept the French frigate Résolue and two French merchant ships that were heading for the French held port of Mangalore. The subsequent Battle of Tellicherry saw Phoenix capture and search all of the vessels. The local French commander was outraged and sent word back to France, but the French authorities were too busy with internal upheaval to pay the incident much notice.

== French Revolutionary Wars ==
Though the conflict with Tipu Sultan was over, the French Revolutionary Wars had only begun. Promoted to rear-admiral on 1 February 1793, Cornwallis remained in the area and aided in the capture of Pondicherry, captaining his new flagship, the frigate HMS Minerva, and commanding a small flotilla of three East Indiamen—Triton, Princess Charlotte, and Calcutta (1795). He left command of Pondicherry to Captain King and returned to England, docking at Spithead in August 1793. He was succeeded in command of the East Indies Station by Commodore (later Admiral) Peter Rainier.

In May 1794 he hoisted his flag aboard the 74-gun HMS Excellent and was promoted vice-admiral of the blue squadron. In August he shifted his flag to the newer and larger 80-gun HMS Caesar and then once more in December to the first rate Royal Sovereign. Throughout this period he was in command of various divisions within the Channel Fleet. The Channel Fleet was responsible for preventing invasion from France and for the blockade of French Channel ports.

=== First Battle of Groix ===
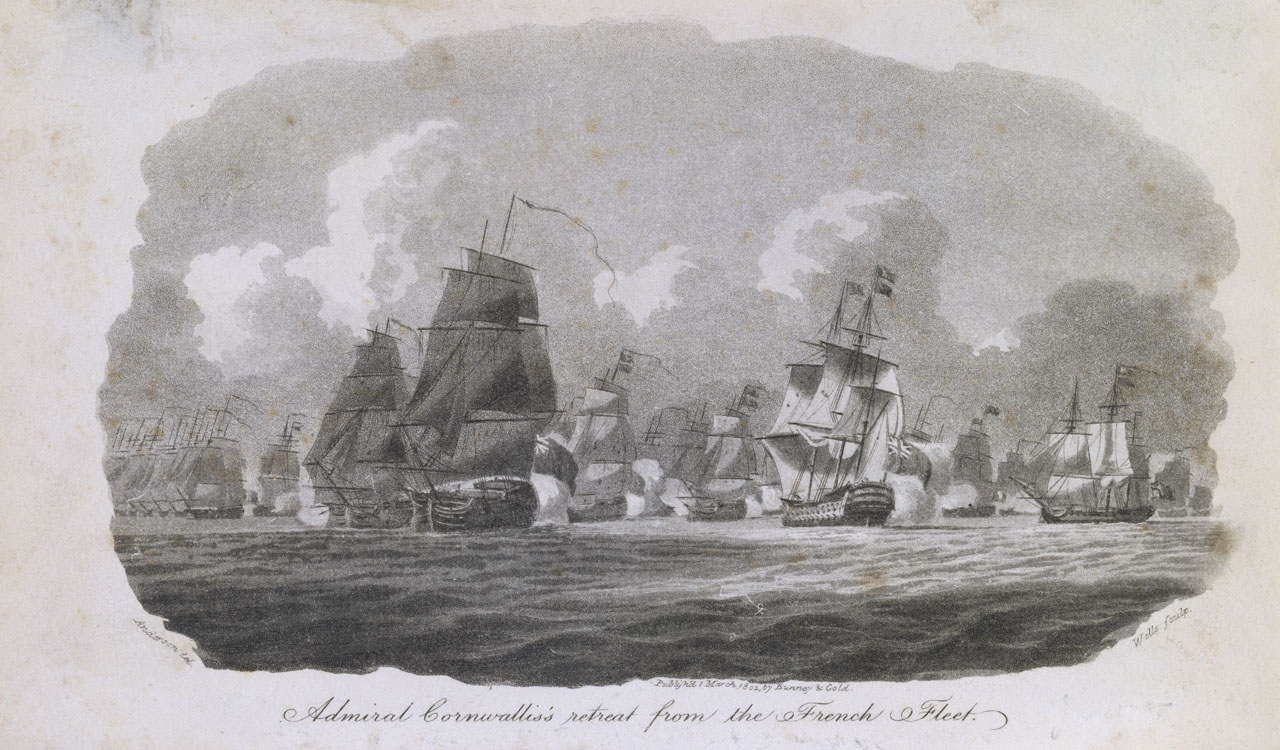
First Battle of Groix 16 June 1795 by William Anderson

On 16 June 1795 he was in command of a small squadron that sighted a much larger French fleet. The ensuing action became famously known as "The Retreat of Cornwallis."

Cornwallis was cruising near Brest with five ships of the line, Royal Sovereign, HMS Mars, HMS Triumph, HMS Brunswick, HMS Bellerophon, two frigates and one cutter, HMS Phaeton, HMS Pallas, HMS Kingfisher when a French fleet of twelve sail of the line and fourteen large frigates appeared, commanded by Admiral Villaret Joyeuse. The odds being very greatly against him, he was compelled to order a retreat. But two of his ships were slow and unweatherly and fell behind the rest. The van of the French fleet began to catch the two slower British ships. The rearmost ship, Mars, was caught and suffered severely in her rigging and was in danger of being surrounded by the French. Witnessing this, Cornwallis turned his squadron around to support her. The French admiral made the assumption that Cornwallis must have sighted assistance beyond his own field of vision and had turned to engage the enemy knowing that a superior force was nearby to come to their relief. The French admiral ordered his ships to disengage and Cornwallis and his small squadron retreated in order. The action is remarkable evidence of the moral superiority which the victory of the Glorious First of June, and the known efficiency of the British crews, had given to the Royal Navy. The reputation of Cornwallis was amplified and the praise given him was no doubt the greater because he was personally very popular with officers and men.

=== Court martial ===
In 1796 Cornwallis incurred a court-martial (in consequence of a misunderstanding and apparently some temper on both sides) on the charge of refusing to obey an order from the Admiralty. He was practically acquitted. The substance of the case was that he demurred on the ground of health at being called upon to go to the West Indies, in a small frigate, and without "comfort".

=== Command of the Channel Fleet ===
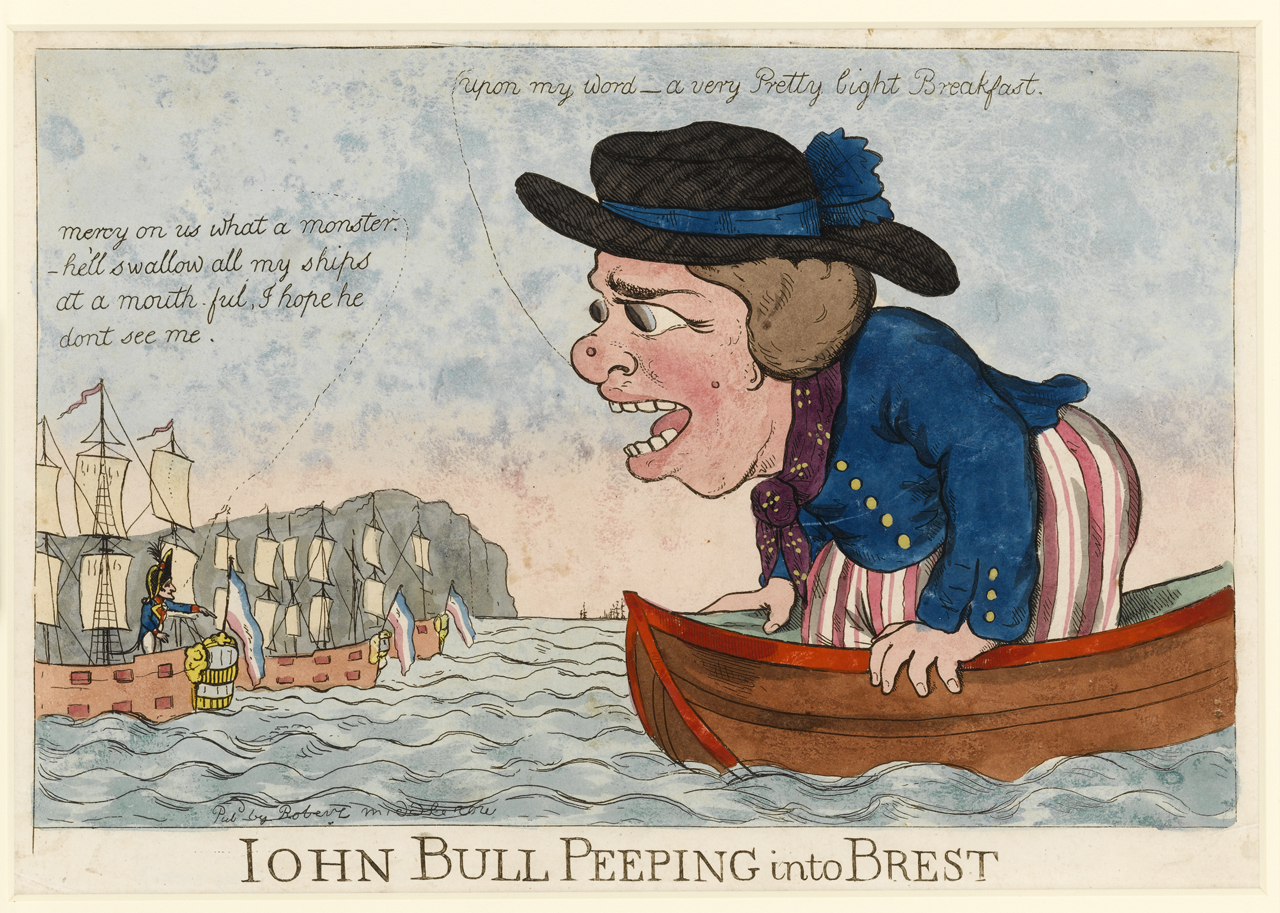
John Bull peeping into Brest, The caption above the French fleet reads: "Mercy on us what a Monster — he'll swallow all my ships at a mouthful. I hope he don't see me."

Cornwallis was promoted Admiral of the Blue squadron on 14 February 1799, and held the Channel Command for a short interval when Admiral Jervis (Earl St. Vincent) fell ill in 1801. Cornwallis took command once more when Jervis stood down as commander and became First Lord of the Admiralty between 1801 and 1804. On 23 April 1804 he advanced to the rank of Admiral of the White. On 9 November 1805 he was promoted Admiral of the Red. During this time Cornwallis was in charge of protecting the coast of the United Kingdom as Napoleon was building a large invasion force. Following Admiral Nelson's victory at Trafalgar, Cornwallis was removed from his post and Earl St. Vincent took his place.

== Honours and politics ==
In 1796, Cornwallis was promoted to Rear-Admiral of Great Britain, the title becoming Rear-Admiral of the United Kingdom after the Act of Union came into force in 1801, and then in 1814 he was promoted to Vice-Admiral of the United Kingdom

His greatest honours might be considered to be his various nicknames among the sailors, "Billy go tight" (given on account of his rubicund complexion), as well as "Billy Blue", "Coachee", and "Mr Whip". Sailors appear to have only given nicknames to those commanders whom they liked. The various nicknames of Cornwallis seem to show that he was regarded with more of affection than reverence. Cornwallis was also made a Knight Grand Cross of the Order of the Bath in 1815.

Cornwallis served as Member of Parliament (MP) for Eye during the periods, 1768–1774, 1782–1784, 1790–1800 and, 1801–1807. He also served as MP for Portsmouth from 1782 to 1790.

== Later life ==
Cornwallis never married. In 1800 he leased and later purchased the Newlands estate in Milford on Sea in Hampshire. He was joined by his close friend and fellow naval officer Captain John Whitby and his wife Mary Anna Theresa Whitby. John Whitby died in 1806, but Mary and her infant daughter Theresa stayed on looking after Cornwallis into his old age. On Sir William Cornwallis' death in 1819, Mary Whitby and her daughter inherited his fortune.

== Bibliography ==
- The naval history of Great Britain from the declaration of war by France in February 1793 to the accession of George IV in January 1820 : with an account of the origin and progressive increase of the British Navy ... Five volumes (London Baldwin, Cradock & Joy, 1822–24); New edition in Six volumes ... and an account of the Burmese War and the battle of Navarino. (London: R. Bentley, 1837); (London: R. Bentley, 1847); (London: R. Bentley, 1859); (London: Richard Bentley, 1860); (London: Richard Bentley, 1886); (London: Macmillan, 1902); (London: Conway Maritime Press, 2002).
- The Naval Chronicle. Vol. 05. Bunney & Gold.
- The Naval Chronicle. Vol. 06. Bunney & Gold.
- The Naval Chronicle. Vol. 07. Bunney & Gold.
- Ralfe, J (1828). Naval Biography of Great Britain, Volume 1. Whitemore & Fenn.
- Dispatches and letters relating to the blockade of Brest, 1803–1805

Military offices
| Preceded by Charles Hughes | Commander-in-Chief, East Indies Station; 1788–1794 | Succeeded by Peter Rainier |
Parliament of Great Britain
| Preceded by The Viscount Allen; Richard Burton | Member of Parliament for Eye; 1768–1774; With: The Viscount Allen 1768–1770; Richard Burton Phillipson 1770–1774 | Succeeded by Richard Burton Phillipson; John St John |
| Preceded by Richard Burton Phillipson; Arnoldus Jones-Skelton | Member of Parliament for Eye; 1782–1784; With: Richard Burton Phillipson | Succeeded by Richard Burton Phillipson; Peter Bathurst |
| Preceded by Sir Henry Fetherstonhaugh; Hon. Thomas Erskine | Member of Parliament for Portsmouth; 1784–1790; With: Sir Henry Fetherstonhaugh | Succeeded by Sir Henry Fetherstonhaugh; Hon. Thomas Erskine |
| Preceded by Richard Burton Phillipson; Peter Bathurst | Member of Parliament for Eye; 1790–1800; With: Richard Burton Phillipson 1790–1792; Peter Bathurst 1792–1795; Viscount Brome 1795–1796; Mark Singleton 1796–1799; James Cornwallis 1799–1800 | Succeeded by Parliament of the United Kingdom |
Parliament of the United Kingdom
| Preceded by Parliament of Great Britain | Member of Parliament for Eye; 1801–1807; With: James Cornwallis 1801–1806; Marquess of Huntly 1806–1807 | Succeeded by Marquess of Huntly; James Cornwallis |
Honorary titles
| Preceded by The Lord Bridport | Rear-Admiral of Great Britain/the United Kingdom; 1796–1814 | Succeeded by Sir William Young |
| Preceded by The Viscount Bridport | Vice-Admiral of the United Kingdom; 1814–1819 | Succeeded by Sir William Young |
