= Richard Burton Phillipson =

Lieutenant-General Richard Burton Phillipson
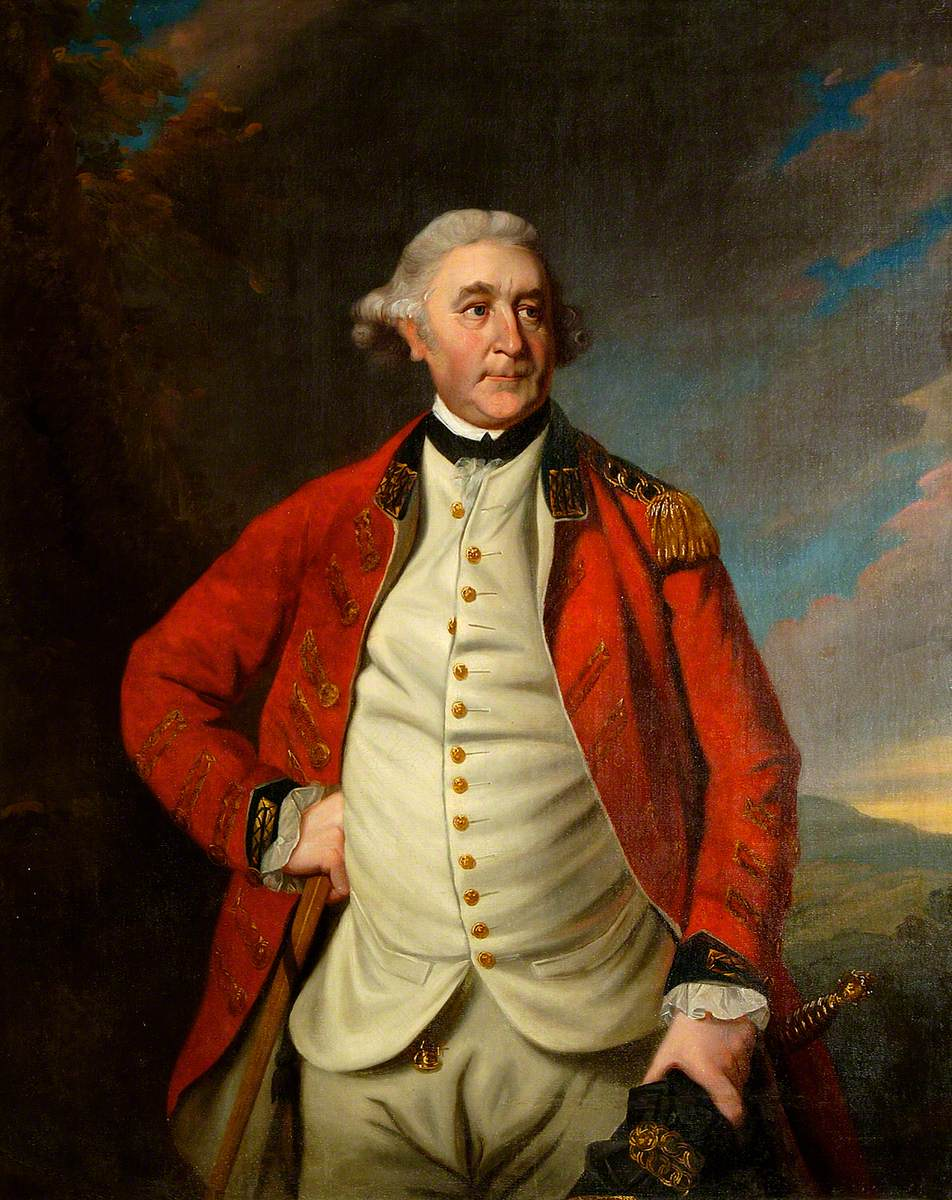
- Portrait after Nathaniel Dance-Holland, c. 1777
- Born: c.1723
- Died: 18 August 1792
- Alma mater: Eton College; Emmanuel College, Cambridge
- Military career
- Allegiance: Great Britain
- Branch: British Army
- Service years: 1744–1792
- Rank: Lieutenant-General
- Unit: 1st Royal Regiment of Dragoons

Lieutenant-General Richard Burton Phillipson (c. 1723–1792) was a British Army officer and politician who sat in the House of Commons between 1762 and 1792.

== Career ==
Burton was the son of William Burton of Herringswell, Suffolk and his wife Grace Phillipson. He was educated at Eton College in 1732 and was admitted at Middle Temple in 1741 and at Emmanuel College, Cambridge aged 18 on 28 January 1742. He joined the army in the 1st The Royal Dragoons, being a cornet in 1744, lieutenant in 1746, captain in 1751, major in 1759 and lieutenant-colonel in 1761.

Burton was returned as member of parliament for Eye through his friend Lord Cornwallis at a by-election in 1762. He took name of Phillipson in 1766 under the terms of a will. In the 1768 general election Burton Phillipson (as he was now named) unsuccessfully contested Winchelsea on behalf of Arnold Nesbitt. He was then returned as MP for Eye in a by-election in 1770. In 1774 and 1780 he was re-elected for Eye. He grew very deaf and stout as he grew older, factors which do not appear to have hampered his military career. However, in 1784 Lord Cornwallis complained of Phillipson having "most provokingly left all his trumpets in London, which is hard upon me in our têtes-à-tête". Philippson was re-elected MP for Eye in 1784 and 1790. There is no record of his having ever spoken during his 28 years in Parliament.

While in Parliament, Phillipson continued his military service and became colonel of the 1st Dragoons in 1775. In 1779 the 20th Light Dragoons was raised from the light troops of the 3rd Dragoon Guards, 1st Dragoons and 11th Dragoons and Phillipson became colonel and then major-general of the regiment in 1779. The 20th Regiment was disbanded and Phillipson became colonel in the 3rd Dragoon Guards in 1785 and was made lieutenant-general in 1787.

Burton Phillipson died unmarried on 18 August 1792 at his home Spring Gardens and buried in St Helen's church, Ipswich where there is a memorial tablet on the north wall.

Parliament of Great Britain
Preceded by Henry Townshend; Viscount Brome	Member of Parliament for Eye; 1762–1768; With: The Viscount Allen	Succeeded by The Viscount Allen; Hon. William Cornwallis
Preceded by The Viscount Allen; Hon. William Cornwallis	Member of Parliament for Eye; 1770–1792; With: Hon. William Cornwallis1770–1774; Francis Osborne, Marquess of Carmarthen 1774; John St John 1774–1780; Arnoldus Jones-Skelton 1780–1782; Hon. William Cornwallis 1782–1784; Peter Bathurst 1784–1790; Hon. William Cornwallis 1790–1792	Succeeded by Peter Bathurst; Hon. William Cornwallis
Preceded by Philip Honywood	Colonel of 3rd (The Prince of Wales's) Dragoon Guards; 1785–1789	Succeeded by Sir William Fawcett
