= Thomas Master (died 1770) =

English Tory politician

Thomas Master (1690 – 5 February 1770), of Cirencester Abbey, Wiltshire, was an English Tory politician who sat in the House of Commons from 1712 to 1747.

Master was the son of Thomas Master of Cirencester Abbey and his wife Elizabeth Driver, daughter of John Driver of Aston, Gloucestershire and was baptised on 12 July 1690. He matriculated at Christ Church, Oxford in 1706. He married Joanna Chapman, daughter of Jasper Chapman of Stratton, Gloucestershire in April 1709 and succeeded his father in 1710.

Master was elected Tory Member of Parliament for Cirencester at a by-election on 23 January 1712 and topped the poll at the 1713 British general election.

Master was returned as MP for Cirencester in 1715, 1722, 1727 and 1734, His only recorded speech was on 3 May 1736 when he opposed the Quaker tithe bill. He was returned again in 1741 but at the 1747, he stood down in favour of his son Thomas.

Master died at the age of about 79. His son Thomas predeceased him.

Parliament of England
Preceded by Allen Bathurst; Charles Coxe	Member of Parliament for Cirencester; 1712–1747; With: Charles Coxe 1712–1713; Benjamin Bathurst 1713–1727; Peter Bathurst 1727–1734; William Wodehouse 1734–1735; Henry Bathurst 1735–1747	Succeeded by Henry Bathurst; Thomas Master
