= Catherine Douglas Bell =

- Born: December 29, 1818; Edinburgh
- Died: November 15, 1861; Edinburgh
- Occupation: Writer

Catherine Douglas Bell (December 29, 1818 – November 15, 1861) was a Scottish children's writer under the name Cousin Kate.

Catherine Douglas Bell was born on December 29, 1818 in Edinburgh, the daughter of William Bell WS, a solicitor, and Margaret Craigie Bell.

Catherine Douglas Bell died on 15 November 1861 in Edinburgh.

== Bibliography ==
1. Set About it at Once: or, Cousin Kate's Story. 1 vol. Edinburgh: W. P. Kennedy, 1847.
2. An Autumn at Karnford: Being a Sequel to "Cousin Kate's Story". 1 vol. Edinburgh: W. P. Kennedy, 1847.
3. Georgie and Lizzie. 1 vol. Edinburgh: W. P. Kennedy, 1849.
4. What May I Learn?: or, Sketches of School Girls. 1 vol. Edinburgh: John D. Lowe, 1849.
5. The Douglas Family. 1 vol. Edinburgh: W. P. Kennedy, 1851.
6. Margaret Cecil: or, I Can, Because I Ought. 1 vol. Edinburgh: W. P. Kennedy, 1851.
7. Arnold Lee: or, Rich Children and Poor Children. 1 vol. Edinburgh: W. P. Kennedy, 1852.
8. Lily Gordon the Young Housekeeper. 1 vol. Edinburgh: W. P. Kennedy, 1853.
9. Hope Campbell: or, Know Thyself. 1 vol. Edinburgh: W. P. Kennedy, 1854.
10. Unconscious Influence: or, Horace and May. 1 vol. Edinburgh: W. P. Kennedy, 1855.
11. Sydney Stuart: or, Love Seeketh not her own. 1 vol. Edinburgh: Edmonston and Douglas, 1856.
12. Help in Time of Need: or, The Lord careth for his own. 1 vol. Edinburgh: W. P. Kennedy, 1856.
13. Mary Elliot: or, Be ye kind one to another. 1 vol. Edinburgh: W. P. Kennedy, 1856.
14. Self-Mastery: or, Kenneth and Hugh. 1 vol. Edinburgh: W. P. Kennedy, 1857.
15. Rest and Unrest: or, The Story of a Year. 1 vol. Edinburgh: W. P. Kennedy, 1858.
16. The Diary of Three Children: or, Fifty-Two Saturdays. 1 vol. Edinburgh: Edmonston and Douglas, 1858.
17. The Children's Mirror: or, Which is my likeness?. 1 vol. Edinburgh: Nelson and Sons, 1859.
18. The Head or the Heart; or, "Knowledge puffeth up, Charity edifieth." London, 1859.
19. Home Sunshine. 1 vol. Edinburgh: W. P. Kennedy, 1859.
20. Mike the Shop-Boy. London: T. Nelson & Sons, 1859. Reprinted as Love thy Neighbor as Thyself; or, the Story of Mike, the Irish Boy. London: T. Nelson & Sons, 1871.
21. Trust in God; or, Jenny's Trials. London, 1859.
22. The Way to Be Happy; or, the Story of Willie, the Gardener Boy. London, 1859.
23. We Love Him Because He First Loved Us; or, the Story of Ned, the Shepherd Boy. London, 1860.
24. Wisdom's Ways are Pleasantness and Peace. London, 1860.
25. Aunt Ailie. 1 vol. Edinburgh: Edmonston and Douglas, 1861.
26. New Stories by Cousin Kate. London, 1861.
27. Rosa's Wish, and How she attained it. 1 vol. Edinburgh: W. P. Kennedy, 1861.
28. Last Hours with Cousin Kate. 1 vol. Edinburgh: W. P. Kennedy, 1862.
29. Short Stories. London, 1862.
30. My First Pennies, and Other Stories. Boston, 1864.
31. Ella and Marian: or, Rest and Unrest. 1 vol. London: Frederick Warne, 1866.
32. The Grahams: or, Home Life. 1 vol. London: Frederick Warne, 1866.
33. The Huguenot Family, or Help in Time of Need. London: Warne, 1866.
34. How to Be Happy: or, Every-Day Work, with Other Tales. 1 vol. London: Frederick Warne, 1867.
35. The Idiot Boy: Short Stories by Cousin Kate. London: Nelson, 1880.
36. The Amulet; or Love thy Neighbour as Thyself. London, 1885.
