= Lord Allen =

Lord Allen may refer to:

- Viscount Allen, a title in the Peerage of Ireland
- Clifford Allen, 1st Baron Allen of Hurtwood (1889–1939), British politician
- Philip Allen, Baron Allen of Abbeydale (1912–2007), British civil servant
- Alfred Allen, Baron Allen of Fallowfield (1914–1985), British trade unionist
- Charles Allen, Baron Allen of Kensington (born 1957), British businessman and broadcaster
