= Charles Coxe =

English lawyer and Tory politician

Charles Coxe (c. 1661–17 October 1728), of Lincoln's Inn and Rodmarton and Lower Lypiatt, Gloucestershire, was an English lawyer and Tory politician who sat in the English and British House of Commons between 1698 and 1722.

== Early life and family ==
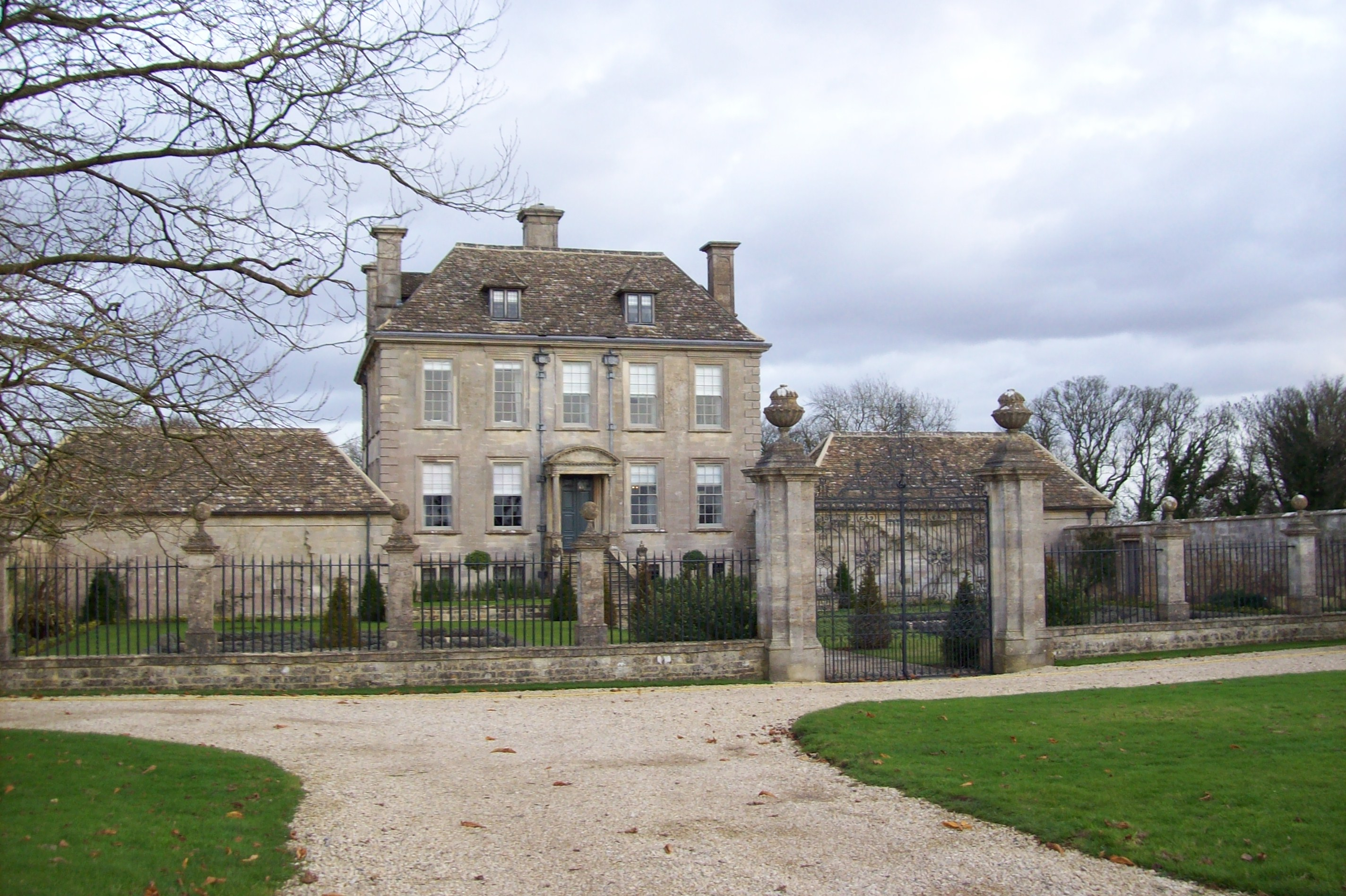
Nether Lypiatt Manor House

Coxe was the second son of John Coxe of Tarlton, Gloucestershire, and his wife Deborah Driver, daughter of John Driver of Avening, Gloucestershire. He matriculated at St. Edmund Hall, Oxford, on 10 July 1674, at the age of 13. He then entered Lincoln's Inn in 1677 to study law and was called to the bar in 1684. In 1692, he succeeded to his father's estates. He married Catherine Chamberlain, the daughter and heiress of John Chamberlain of Wainborough, Wiltshire, and his wife Ann Freame, daughter of Thomas Freame of Lower Lypiatt, on 15 February 1693. He thereby acquired the manor of Nether Lypiatt in 1699. As a lawyer Coxe was Clerk of the Letters Patent from 1699 to his death and serjeant-at-law from 1700.

== Career ==
In 1698, Coxe was returned as Member of Parliament for Cirencester. He was returned unopposed at the first general election of 1701. Subsequently, he was blacklisted for opposing preparations for war. Returned again at the second general election of 1701 he was classified as a Tory. He had a close friendship with Harley through which he was appointed a puisne justice in June 1702 among the Tory appointments that followed the accession of Queen Anne. He was returned unopposed for Cirencester at the 1702 general election. In 1704 he was promoted to chief justice of Brecknock on the South Wales circuit through Harley's influence. At the 1705 general election Coxe was involved in a double return at Cirencester with Henry Ireton. He petitioned but then withdrew on 15 November, leaving Ireton to be declared duly elected. It was claimed that he did so to avoid a scrutiny by the House of the bribery that been practised by both sides, which would have damaged his position as a judge.

Coxe recovered his seat at Cirencester at the 1708 general election, but his election was declared void on 10 December 1709. He was successfully returned in the subsequent by-election on 23 December 1709. At the 1710 general election he was returned again for Cirencester. His former partner at Cirencester, Allen Bathurst, was raised to the peerage in 1712. At the 1713 Bathurst asked Coxe to make way for one of his brothers at Cirenccester, while the other seat was taken by Thomas Master. Coxe was forced to transfer to Gloucester where Thomas Webb, one of the sitting Members, was persuaded to give up his seat, and Coxe was elected as MP for the constituency.

With the change of regime in 1714 Coxe was dismissed from his post as judge, but was returned again as MP for Gloucester at the 1715 general election. He voted consistently against the government. He did not stand at the 1722 general election.

== Death and legacy ==
Coxe built the present house of Nether Lypiatt manor in 1717. The house is now Grade I listed. He died on 17 October 1728 and was buried at Rodmarton. He and his wife had four sons and two daughters. He left the house at Lower Lypiatt and his estate at Tarlton to his son John, while he left his three manors and various other lands near Cirencester and Stroud to his grandson.

Parliament of England
| Preceded by Richard Howe; John Grubham Howe | Member of Parliament for Cirencester; 1698–1705; With: Henry Ireton 1698–1701; James Thynne 1701; William Master 1701–1705 | Succeeded by Allen Bathurst; Henry Ireton |
Parliament of Great Britain
| Preceded by Allen Bathurst; Henry Ireton | Member of Parliament for Cirencester; 1708–1713; With: Allen Bathurst 1708–1712; Thomas Master 1712–1713 | Succeeded by Thomas Master; Benjamin Bathurst |
| Preceded by Thomas Webb; John Blanch | Member of Parliament for Gloucester; 1713–1722; With: John Snell | Succeeded by John Snell; Charles Hyett |
