= Horton Road =

Street in Gloucester, England

Coordinates: 51°51′57.07″N 2°13′37.54″W

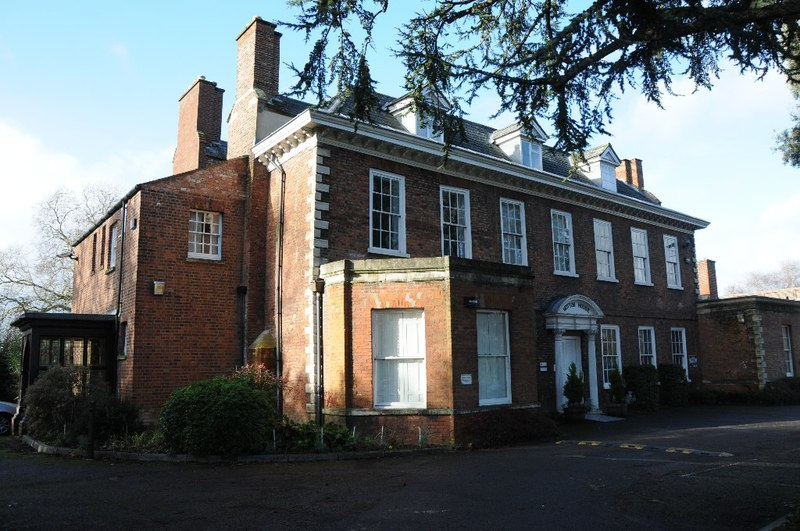
Wotton House

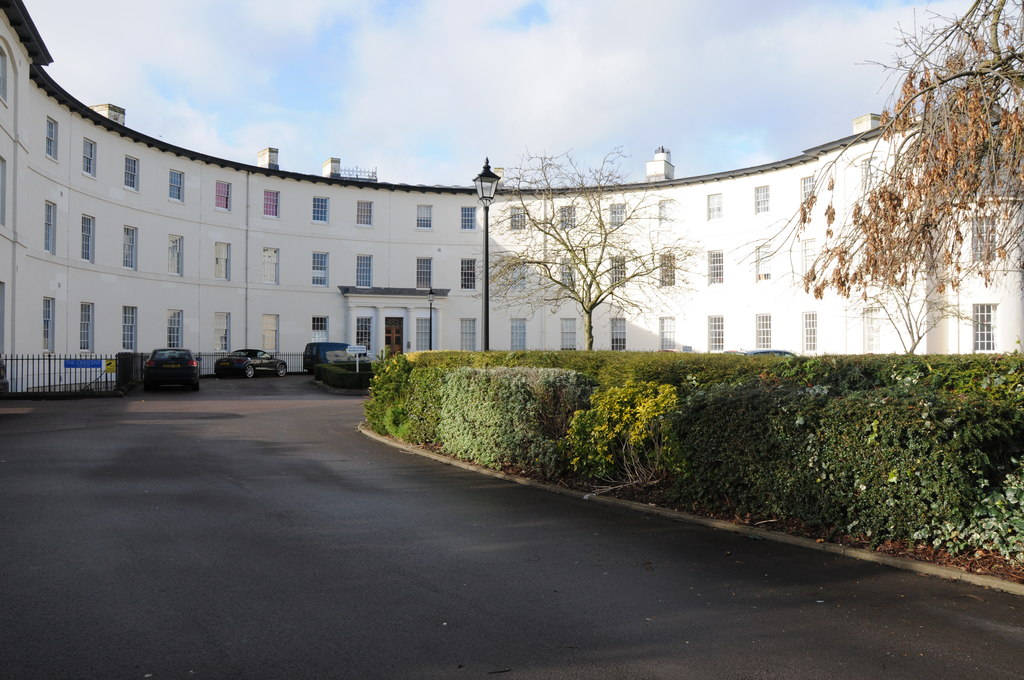
Former Horton Road Hospital

Horton Road is a street in the City of Gloucester, England. It is the location of Wotton House, Horton Road Hospital, and the former Horton Road Stadium. It runs from London Road in the north to Metz Way in the south.

Wotton House was built around 1707 for Thomas Horton.
