= Peter Bathurst (Salisbury MP) =

British landowner and Tory politician

- Portrait traditionally identified as Peter Bathurst

Member of the British Parliament for Wilton
- In office 1711–1713

Member of the British Parliament for Cirencester
- In office 1727–1734

Member of the British Parliament for Salisbury
- In office 1734–1741

Personal details
- Born: 3 May 1687
- Died: 6 May 1748 (aged 61)
- Party: Tory
- Spouse(s): Leonora-Maria How (m. 1709) Selina Shirley (m. 1720)
- Children: 17, including Peter
- Parents: Benjamin Bathurst (father); Frances Apsley (mother)
- Education: Trinity College, Oxford

Peter Bathurst (3 May 1687 – 1748), of Greatworth, Northamptonshire and Clarendon Park, near Salisbury, Wiltshire, was a British landowner and Tory politician who sat in the House of Commons between 1711 and 1741.

Bathurst was the second son of Sir Benjamin Bathurst, MP, of Paulerspury, Northamptonshire, and his wife Frances Apsley, daughter of Sir Allen Apsley, MP of Apsley, Sussex. As a child he was a companion to the Duke of Gloucester, with his brother Benjamin, at the court of Princess Anne. He was educated at Eton College in about 1700, and matriculated at Trinity College, Oxford in 1703. His father left him lands in Lincolnshire. He married Leonora-Maria How, daughter of Charles How of Greatworth, Northamptonshire in 1709 and acquired part of his father-in-law's estate. His wife died in January 1720, and he married as his second wife Lady Selina Shirley, daughter of Robert Shirley, 1st Earl Ferrers on 24 October 1720. He also acquired at some stage the Clarendon Park estate near Wilton which he made his main residence.

Bathurst was returned on petition as Tory Member of Parliament for Wilton on 17 March 1711 following the 1710 British general election. He was a member of the October Club, and was listed as a "worthy patriot" who was involved in detecting the mismanagements of the previous Whig administration.

After standing unsuccessfully for Salisbury at the 1722 British general election, Bathurst was returned as Tory MP for Cirencester on the family interest at the 1727 British general election. He followed his brother, Allen, Lord Bathurst, in Parliament, and voted regularly against the Government in all recorded divisions. At the 1734 British general election, when Cirencester was not available, he changed seats and was returned as MP for Salisbury. He again voted against the Government, except when he was one of the Tories who withdrew on the motion for Walpole's dismissal in 1741. His only recorded speech was in 1736, against a bill to prevent clandestine marriages. He did not stand at the 1741 British general election and was defeated at Salisbury at the 1747 British general election.

Bathurst died on 6 May 1748 and was buried at Laverstock. His memorial inscription describes him as "a lover of letters and liberal knowledge, affectionate and affable to a numerous family". He had two daughters with his first wife and five sons and ten daughters with his second wife. His eldest son, Peter, succeeded to Clarendon, but it eventually passed to the descendants of his eldest daughter, Selina.

Parliament of Great Britain
Preceded by John London; Charles Mompesson	Member of Parliament for Wilton; 1711–1713; With: Charles Mompesson	Succeeded by John London; Thomas Pitt
Preceded by Thomas Master; Benjamin Bathurst	Member of Parliament for Cirencester; 1727–1734; With: Thomas Master	Succeeded by Thomas Master; William Wodehouse
Preceded by Anthony Duncombe; Thomas Lewis	Member of Parliament for Salisbury; 1734–1741; With: Henry Hoare	Succeeded by Sir Jacob Bouverie; Sir Edward Seymour
