= Henry Bathurst, 2nd Earl Bathurst =

British lawyer and politician

The Right Honourable The Earl Bathurst PC KC
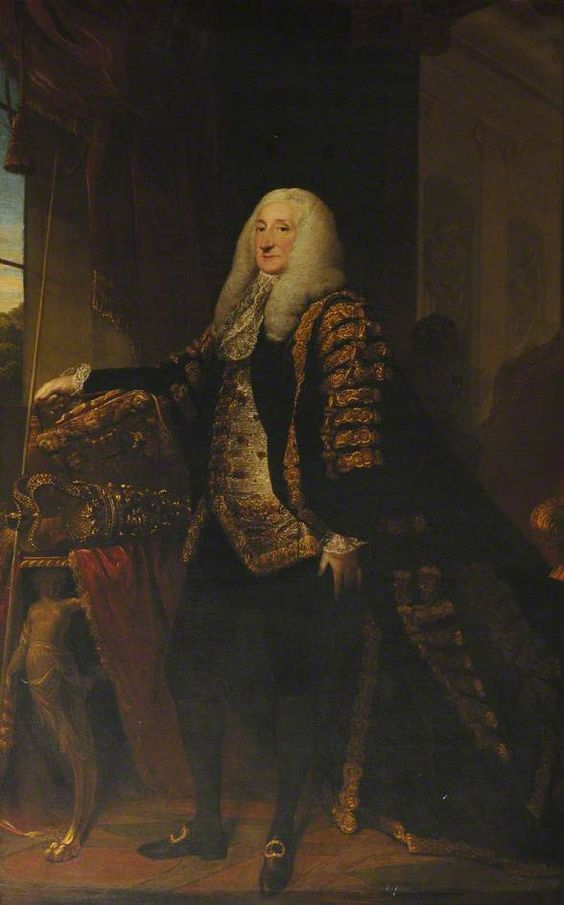
- Portrait by David Martin

Lord Chancellor Lord High Steward for the trial of: List: The Duchess of Kingston-upon-Hull
- In office 23 January 1771 – 3 June 1778
- Monarch: George III
- Prime Minister: The Lord North
- Preceded by: In Commission
- Succeeded by: The Lord Thurlow

Lord President of the Council
- In office 24 November 1779 – 27 March 1782
- Monarch: George III
- Prime Minister: Lord North
- Preceded by: The Earl Gower
- Succeeded by: The Earl Camden

Personal details
- Born: 20 May 1714
- Died: 6 August 1794 (aged 80)
- Spouses: Anne James (m. 1754; died 1758) Tryphena Scawen (m. 1759)
- Children: Henry Bathurst, 3rd Earl Bathurst; Apsley Bathurst
- Parent(s): Allen Bathurst, 1st Earl Bathurst; Catherine Apsley
- Education: Balliol College, Oxford

Henry Bathurst, 2nd Earl Bathurst PC KC (20 May 1714 – 6 August 1794), known as The Lord Apsley from 1771 to 1775, was a British lawyer and politician. He was Lord High Chancellor of Great Britain from 1771 to 1778.

== Background and education ==
Bathurst was the eldest son of Allen Bathurst, 1st Earl Bathurst, and his wife Catherine (née Apsley). Educated at Balliol College, Oxford, he was called to the bar, Lincoln's Inn, in 1736. He practised on the Oxford circuit and became a King's Counsel in 1745 after several years sitting in King's Bench.

== Political and judicial career ==
In April 1735 he was elected member of parliament for Cirencester, and was rewarded for his opposition to the government by being made solicitor-general in 1745 and, then attorney-general to Frederick, Prince of Wales in 1748. Frederick died in 1751, but Bathurst was asked to carry on in the same office for Prince George.

Resigning his seat in parliament in April 1754 he was made a judge and bencher of the Court of Common Pleas in the following month. Bathurst remained opposed to the Whigs, despite the ill-fated attempt by the Tories to capitalise from Walpole's fall.

He was admitted to the Privy Council when the death of the Lord Chancellor's death left the post vacant with no candidate. Appointed one of the three commissioners of the Great Seal of England he was favourite for the post and, later allowed as Lord High Chancellor of Great Britain in January 1771; he was on the occasion raised to the peerage as Baron Apsley, in the County of Sussex. He was roundly abused in rhyme and doggerel by satirical writings of Whigs Lord Brougham and Lord Lyndhurst. The best they could say about him was that he was "not disagreeable", but ridiculed his ability at the bar, and mocked a Tory as incompetent. In January 1774 he was instrumental in writing the Intolerable Acts which he supported in parliament and the courts, most notably the Boston Port Act which gave rise to the Boston Tea Party and revolution. The judge was not a war-monger nor had he any experience of soldiering, but the perception was political. In 1777 after the American Frigates had defeated once or twice, Bathurst worried that Great Britain might lose her control of the coastline urged peace preliminaries in order to save the colonies in the West Indies. He was a personal friend of Admiral William Howe, who was known to him since boyhood. Having succeeded his father as second Earl Bathurst in September 1775, he resigned his office somewhat unwillingly in July 1778 to enable Lord Thurlow to join the cabinet of Lord North. In November 1779 he was appointed Lord President of the Council, and left office with North in March 1782.

In 1771 the construction of Apsley House was started. A neo-classical facade made of brick with five bays. It had large light and airy sash windows and in the centre of the house a large sweeping circular staircase of exquisite design. The house was remodelled by the Duke of Wellington when he was prime minister between 1828 and 1830, when it was encased in Bath stone. But Lord Bathurst sold the house to the south of Hyde Park, also known as 'Number One, London', removing his estates to the country as befitted a fox-hunting Tory. Lord Bathurst used the proceeds to invest in more acreage at Cirencester Park which was planted with trees for landscaping and hunting.

King George III held faith with Bathurst as the Speaker of the House of Lords. A former treasury commissioner he had the sinecure of a tellership of the Exchequer. It entailed some duties but the job was worth £1,200 per annum. More importantly for the succession to the estates, he was able to secure a tellership for his son by 1790. He continued to plant a new garden into his retirement. Then in 1788, a sick King George decided he would take the waters at Cheltenham with Queen Charlotte. En route, the royal family stopped during July at Cirencester Park. Lord Bathurst developed the Sapperton tunnel the following year for the new Thames and Severn Canal. During the reign, hundreds of local acts of Parliament authorised the construction of roads, bridges, tunnels, and infrastructures.

Lord Bathurst's letters show he was a kindly man with a reserved temperament. He was a good patrician master taking care of his workers, he paid more than most employers, and ensured they saw a doctor if necessary. But Bathurst's moral philosophy earned enemies among the whigs, particularly Horace Walpole, the journalist of Strawberry Hill, who bore a grudge for the attacks on the Walpole ministry.

== Family ==
Lord Bathurst married firstly Anne James in 1754, but she died in 1758 without issue. He married secondly Tryphena, daughter of Thomas Scawen, in 1759. He died at Oakley Grove near Cirencester on 6 August 1794, aged 80, and was succeeded in the earldom by his son from his second marriage, Henry. Lady Bathurst died in 1807. Apsley House, in Hyde Park, London, known as 'Number One, London', was built for him by Robert Adam. It was sold in 1807 to the first Marquess of Wellesley, who sold it in 1817 to his younger brother, Arthur Wellesley, 1st Duke of Wellington.

== Namesakes ==
- Electoral division of Apsley
- Apsley River (Tasmania)

== See also ==
- Bathurst (surname)
- Earl Bathurst
- List of Lord Chancellors

== Notes ==
Parliament of Great Britain
Preceded by Thomas Master	Member of Parliament for Cirencester; 1735–1754; With: Thomas Master 1735–1747; Thomas Master 1747–1749; John Coxe 1749–1754	Succeeded by Benjamin Bathurst; John Dawnay
Political offices
Preceded by In Commission	Lord High Chancellor of Great Britain; 1771–1778	Succeeded by The Lord Thurlow
Preceded by The Earl Gower	Lord President of the Council; 1779–1782	Succeeded by The Lord Camden
Peerage of Great Britain
Preceded by Allen Bathurst	Earl Bathurst; 1775–1794	Succeeded by Henry Bathurst
New creation	Baron Apsley; 1771–1794	Succeeded by Henry Bathurst
