= Thomas Horton (Gloucester) =

Owner of Wonton House

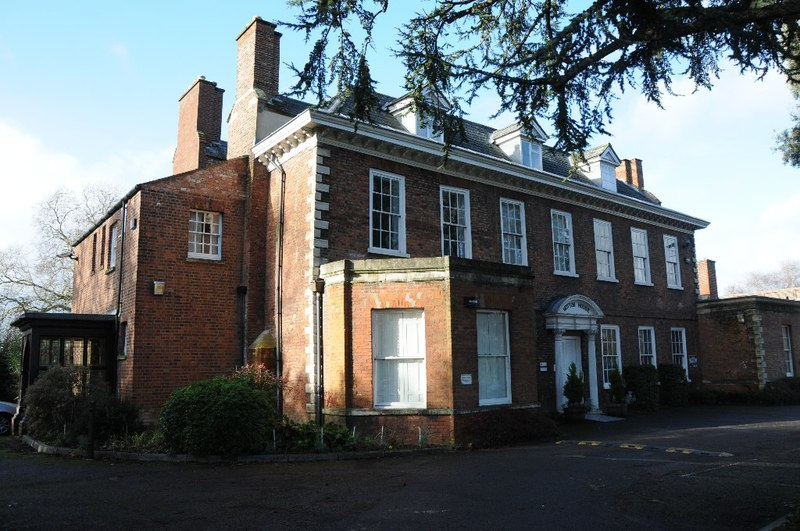
Wotton House

Thomas Horton (1676-1727) was the owner of Wotton House, Gloucester|Wotton House, in Horton Road, Gloucester, which was built for him around 1707. He was declared a lunatic.

== Biography ==
Horton was the son of John Horton of Elkstone, Gloucestershire and his wife Catherine, the daughter of Thomas Child of Northwick, Worcestershire. He acquired Wotton by his marriage to Mary, the daughter of John Blanch. He also inherited the manor of Broughton Gifford, Wiltshire in 1693. By 1722 he was mentally unfit to manage his estate and a petition was presented to the House of Lords by his wife and two daughters for support. He died in 1727 and was commemorated by a memorial stone at Elkstone.

Horton was succeeded by his son Thomas (died 1755), later of Abergavenny, Monmouthshire. He married Jane, daughter of Archdeacon Lewis. She died in 1735 and was buried at Elkstone. In 1746 he was subject to a "commission and inquisition of lunacy, into his state of mind and his property", records relating to which are held by the British National Archives. Horton junior's will, which was dated 1735, left his estate to his sisters Eleanor, the wife of Richard Roberts and Elizabeth, the wife of William Blanch. The will was not confirmed until 1763 due to legal disputes over the estate.
