= John Allen, 4th Viscount Allen =

Captain John Allen, 4th Viscount Allen (b. bef. 1726 – 10 November 1753), was an Irish peer and politician.

He was the son of Hon. Richard A. Allen and Dorothy Green, and grandson of John Allen, 1st Viscount Allen. He served as a captain in General Browne's Regiment of Horse. Allen sat as member of parliament (MP) for County Wicklow from 1742 until 1745, when he succeeded his cousin as Viscount Allen on the latter's death.

Allen never married and, on his death, his titles passed to his younger brother.

Parliament of Ireland
| Preceded by William Hoey; Robert Allen | Member of Parliament for County Wicklow with William Hoey; 1742–1745 | Succeeded by William Hoey; Anthony Brabazon |
Peerage of Ireland
| Preceded by John Allen | Viscount Allen; 1745–1753 | Succeeded by Joshua Allen |
