= Benjamin Bathurst (courtier) =

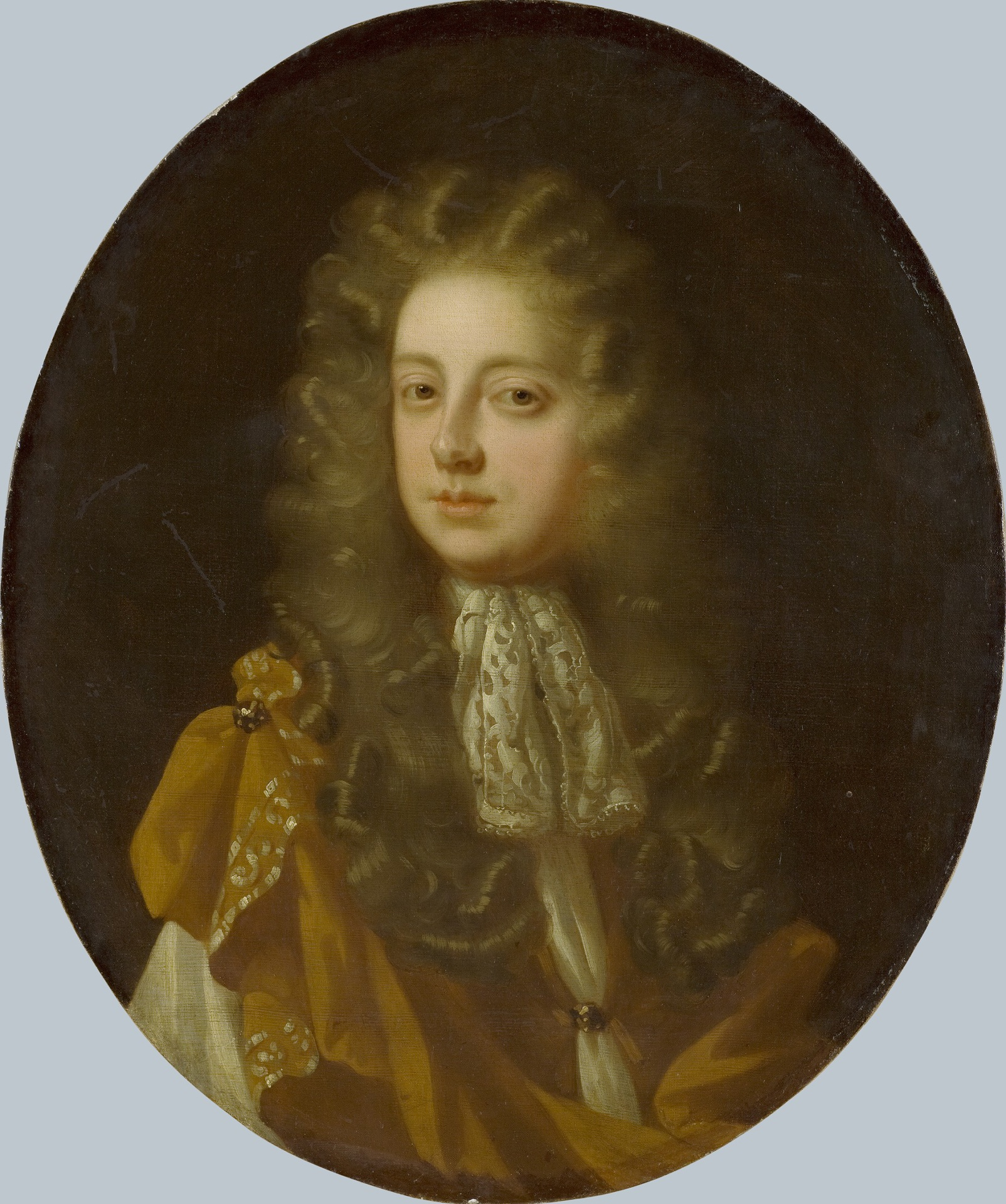

Member of the English Parliament for Bere Alston
- In office 1685–1689

Governor of the East India Company
- In office 1688–1690

Governor of the Levant Company
- In office 1688–1689
- In office 1695

Member of the British Parliament for New Romney
- In office 1702–1704

Cofferer of the Household
- In office 1702–1704
- Monarch: Queen Anne

Personal details
- Born: c. 1639
- Died: 1704
- Spouse: Frances Apsley
- Children: 4, including Allen, Peter and Benjamin

Sir Benjamin Bathurst (c. 1639 – 1704) was an English courtier, politician and slave trader who served as a governor of the East India and Levant companies and a Cofferer of the Household.

== Early life ==
He was born the 6th surviving son of George Bathurst of Theddingworth, Leicestershire and his first wife Elizabeth Villiers of Hothorpe Hall, Northamptonshire. His family were supporters of King Charles I and after the latter's execution, he chose to move to live in Cádiz. On his return to England as a wealthy man he married Frances Apsley, a close friend of Princess Anne, who obtained for him a position as Treasurer of her Household, which he retained despite mounting evidence over the years that he was embezzling money from Anne and her husband. He bought the manor of Paulerspury in Northamptonshire and became a London Alderman. He was also made Treasurer to the Duke of York (later James II of England) and in 1682 was knighted.

== Career ==
=== Parliamentary career ===
Bathurst entered Parliament in 1685 to represent New Romney as a government nominee, but then chose to represent Bere Alston instead, for which he had also been elected. He held that seat until the election of 1689.

=== Royal Africa Company and East India Company ===
Bathurst was heavily involved in the slave trade through his senior appointments in the Royal Africa Company and the East India Company. During his association with the former, it oversaw 222 slaving voyages, transporting more than 71,000 enslaved people.

He was an assistant of the Royal Africa Company from 1677–9, in 1684, 1687–8, 1690–5, 1700, a deputy-governor in 1680–1681 and a sub-governor in 1682–1683, 1685–1686 and 1689. Bathurst held over £3,000 in stock in the Company (around £600,000 in 2026).

Bathurst was deputy governor of the East India Company in 1686–1668 and 1695–1696 and governor in 1688–1690.

=== Levant Company ===
He was deputy governor of the Levant Company in 1686–1687 and governor in 1688–1689 and 1695.

=== Royal court ===
In 1702, on the accession of Queen Anne, he was appointed Cofferer of the Household and again elected to Parliament to represent New Romney, holding both positions until his death in 1704. Although Anne had been convinced of his dishonesty for several years, her friendship with his wife seems to have secured his position. He had married Frances, the daughter of Sir Allen Apsley of Westminster and Frances Petre, and had 3 sons and a daughter. His 3 sons all became MPs themselves and were Allen Bathurst, 1st Earl Bathurst (born 1684), Peter Bathurst (1687) and Benjamin Bathurst (1692).

== Cirencester Park ==
In 1700, Bathurst purchased Cirencester Park with earnings from commodities including Gold, Silver, cloth and spices as well as the proceeds of slavery. It is still owned by the Bathurst family. When Bathurst died, he left a fortune great enough to endow all three of his sons with country estates.

== See also ==
- List of East India Company directors

Parliament of England
Preceded by Sir Duncombe Colchester; Sir John Elwill, 1st Baronet	Member of Parliament for Bere Alston; 1685–1687; With: John Maynard	Succeeded by John Maynard; Sir John Elwill, 1st Baronet
Preceded by John Brewer; Edward Goulston	Member of Parliament for New Romney; 1702–1704; With: John Brewer	Succeeded by John Brewer; Walter Whitfield
Political offices
Preceded by Francis Newport, 1st Earl of Bradford	Cofferer of the Household; 1702–1704	Succeeded by Francis Godolphin, 2nd Earl of Godolphin
