= Thomas Master (died 1749) =

English politician

Thomas Master (1717 – 29 May 1749) was an English politician who sat in the House of Commons from 1747 to 1749.

Master was the son of Thomas Master of Cirencester Abbey and his wife Joanna Chapman, daughter of Jasper Chapman of Stratton, Gloucestershire and was baptised on 31 May 1717. He was educated at Westminster School and Balliol College, Oxford. In 1747, he was elected Member of Parliament for Cirencester and sat until his death at the age of about 30 in 1749.

Master married his father's ward Elizabeth Chester Cann, daughter of Sir William Cann, 3rd Baronet of Compton Greenfield, Gloucestershire on 26 December 1742 and had two sons.

Parliament of Great Britain
Preceded by Henry Bathurst; Thomas Master	Member of Parliament for Cirencester; 1747–1749; With: Henry Bathurst	Succeeded by Henry Bathurst; John Coxe
