= Joshua Allen, 5th Viscount Allen =

Irish peer and soldier

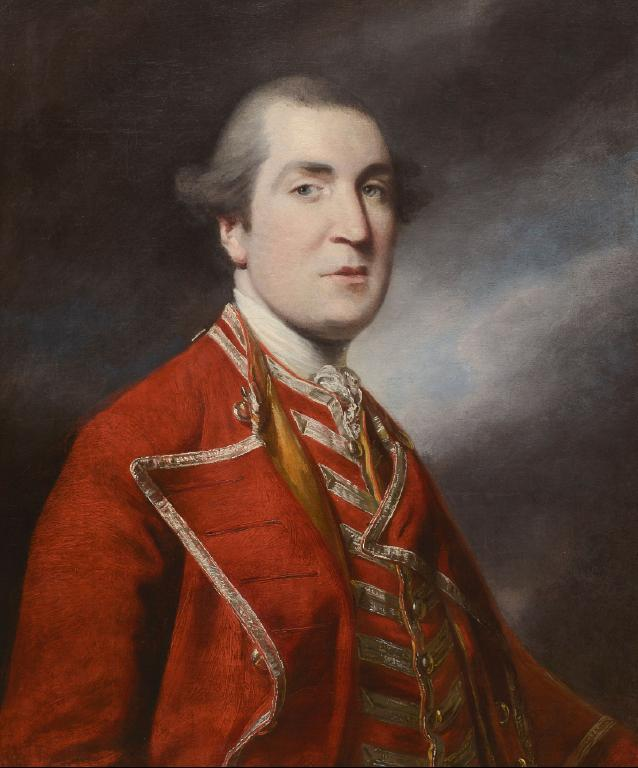
Joshua Allen, 5th Viscount Allen, portrait by Joshua Reynolds

Captain Joshua Allen, 5th Viscount Allen (26 April 1728 – 1 February 1816), was an Irish peer.

== Life ==
The son of Hon. Richard A. Allen and Dorothy Green, and grandson of John Allen, 1st Viscount Allen, he succeeded to the title of 5th Viscount Allen, County Kildare, and its subsidiary titles, on 10 November 1753, on the death of his brother, the 4th Viscount, who had died without issue.

He gained the rank of captain in 1758 in the service of the 37th Regiment, under Prince Ferdinand of Brunswick, and fought in the Battle of Minden in 1759.

He was a Member of Parliament (MP) for Eye from 1762 to 1770.

== Family ==
He married Frances Elizabeth Barry (d. 11 August 1833), on 5 August 1781. Daughter of Gaynor Barry Esq. They had two children.

- Hon. Letitia Dorothea Allen (died 14 June 1878); she married 17 May 1806 William Herbert, Dean of Manchester.
- Joshua William Allen, 6th Viscount Allen (born c 1782–1845)

== Notes ==
Peerage of Ireland
Preceded by John Allen	Viscount Allen; 1753–1816	Succeeded by Joshua Allen
Parliament of Great Britain
Preceded by Henry Townshend; Viscount Brome	Member of Parliament for Eye; 1762–1770; With: Richard Burton 1762–68; William Cornwallis from 1768	Succeeded by William Cornwallis; Richard Burton
