= Joshua Allen, 6th Viscount Allen =

Irish peer

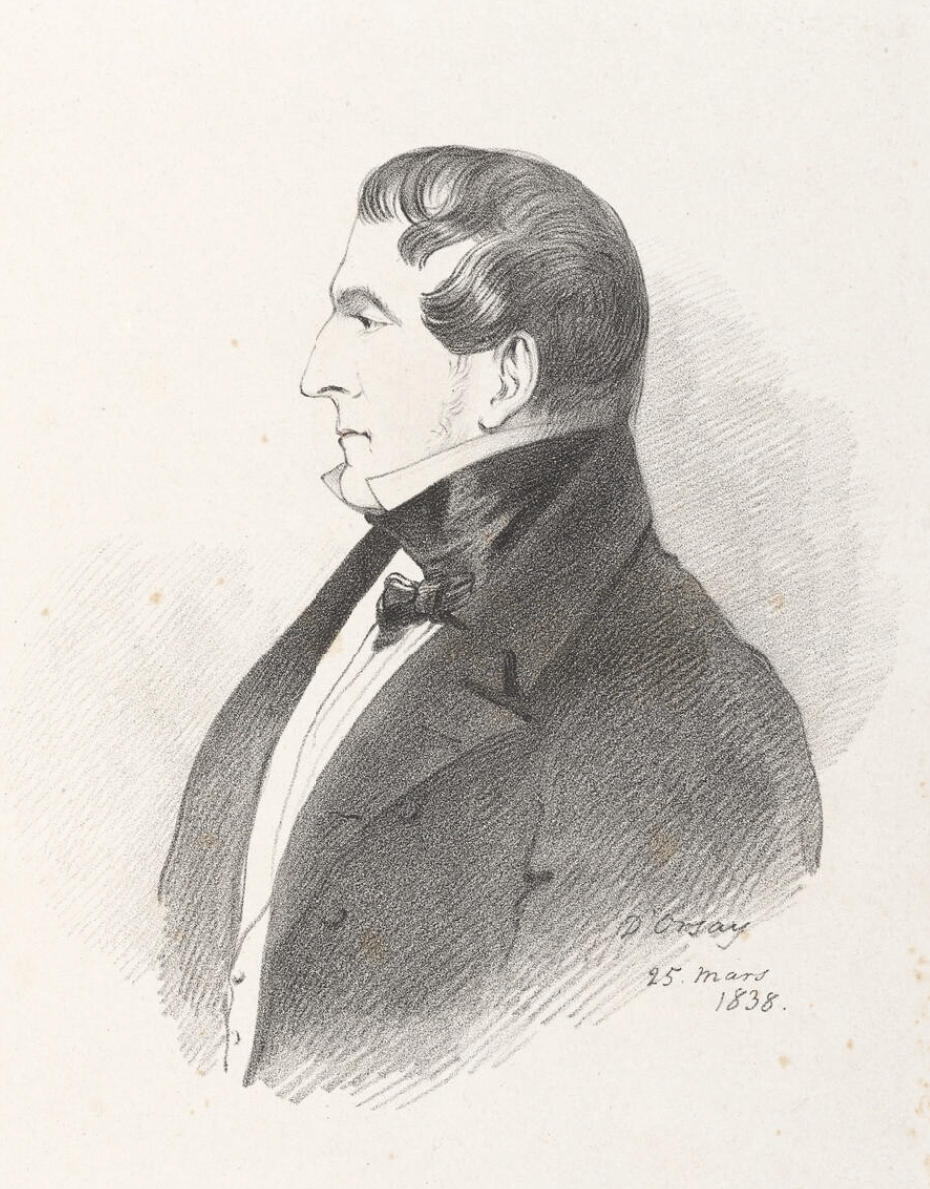
Joshua Allen, 6th Viscount Allen, 1838 lithograph

Joshua William Allen, 6th Viscount Allen MA (c. 1782 – 21 September 1846), was an Irish peer and dandy.

== Life ==
He was the son of Joshua Allen, 5th Viscount Allen. He matriculated at Christ Church, Oxford, in 1801.

Allen was a Guards officer in the Peninsular War, noted for his conduct at the battle of Talavera. He acquired the nickname "King" Allen. He succeeded to the titles of 6th Viscount Allen, County Kildare, and 6th Baron Allen of Stillorgan, on 1 February 1816.

Viscount Allen never married; and on his death his titles became extinct.

== Dandy ==
Allen was a prominent London dandy, supposed to have said that "the English could make nothing well but a kitchen poker". At White's, he succeeded to the bow window place of honour, once occupied by Beau Brummell, after William Arden, 2nd Baron Alvanley.

== Notes ==
Peerage of Ireland
Preceded by Joshua Allen	Viscount Allen; 1816–1846	Extinct
