= William Stark (architect) =

Scottish architect and town planner

William Stark (25 May 1770 – 9 October 1813) was an influential Scottish architect and town planner. He suffered from poor health and died relatively young, but his proposals for the development of Edinburgh's Third New Town were faithfully carried on by his pupil William Henry Playfair, who later designed many of Edinburgh's neoclassical landmarks.

Few of Stark's buildings survive, but his interiors at the Signet Library in the Parliament House building, finished in time for the visit to Edinburgh of George IV in 1822, remain amongst Edinburgh's finest architectural works.

== Life and reputation ==
William Stark was born in Dunfermline, Fife, the son of Mark Stark, a Glasgow merchant and mill-owner, and grandson of the Rev Robert Stark of Torryburn. Stark's older sister Sarah married the Glasgow architect John Craig in 1787 and it is possible that the young Stark started his career in his office. In 1798 Stark visited St Petersburg and Moscow in Russia, possibly in connection with the neoclassical Scottish architect Charles Cameron, who worked at the court of Catherine the Great.

Stark's career began in Glasgow around 1802, but he moved to Edinburgh for the sake of his health about 1807. He died at his home in Drayton House on Broughton Road, Edinburgh, on 9 October 1813 and was buried at Greyfriars Kirkyard.

Sir Walter Scott, who employed Stark at Abbotsford around 1811–13, described him as having ‘genius’ and said that "he must rise very high in his profession if the bad health from which he suffers does not keep him down". After his death, Scott said "more genius has died than is left behind among the collected universality of Scottish architects". Lord Cockburn described Stark as "the best modern architect that Scotland has produced'. The Scots Magazine, in which his plan for the Third New Town was published in 1815, reported that "his reputation, deservedly high in Scotland, was spreading rapidly in England at the time of his death".

== Designer of lunatic asylums ==
Stark had a special interest in the design and organisation of lunatic asylums, based on the medical opinion of his day. His Remarks on the Construction of Public Hospitals for the Cure of Mental Derangement was published in 1807.

He designed the Glasgow Lunatic Asylum in 1810, in which patients were segregated by sex, social background and mental condition, according to his principles. Opened in 1814, this was one of the earliest asylums to do this. He was also responsible for the Dundee Royal Lunatic Asylum built in 1812 and the Gloucester Asylum.

== Town planning ==
Stark was also interested in town planning. His Report to the Lord Provost, Magistrates and Council of Edinburgh on the Plans for Laying out the Grounds for Buildings between Edinburgh and Leith was published posthumously in 1814. It was also published in The Scots Magazine in 1815.

This short essay emphasised building the Edinburgh townscape with Picturesque variety and careful attention to contours, using the benefits of oblique views and the value of trees, rather than imposing the geometry and symmetry exemplified by James Craig's First New Town.

Stark wrote, "It seems to be admitted to have been a prejudice, that trees and town buildings are incongruous objects. They must surely be admitted to assimilate well together, since our best landscape painters, Claude and the Poussins, never tired to painting them, nor the world of admiring what they painted. From the practice of these great masters, who we must regard as unerring authorities, of constantly combining trees and architecture, it must be inferred to have been their opinion that there could be no beauty where either of these objects was wanting."

Stark's principles were followed by his pupil William Henry Playfair, who was able to realise many of Stark's ideas in his extensive work in Edinburgh in the first half of the 19th century.

== Family ==
In 1805, Stark married Catherine Thomson, daughter of the musical scholar George Thomson who worked with Robert Burns and Beethoven. The couple had a daughter in 1806, also named Catherine.

== Works ==
=== Buildings and designs ===
- 1802, 1805 Glasgow Cathedral: alterations to east end and refitting Inner High Church
- 1804 Hunterian Museum, University of Glasgow
- 1807 St George's Church, Glasgow
- 1808 St Cuthbert's Church, Edinburgh: rebuilding southwest tower
- 1809 Grange Hall, Forres, Morayshire
- 1809 Saline Parish Church, Saline, Fife
- 1810 Glasgow Lunatic Asylum, opened in 1814
- 1812 Dundee Royal Lunatic Asylum, designed in an H-shaped block with single storey wings overlooking gardens
- 1812 Parliament House, Edinburgh, design of Signet Library and Upper Advocates Library
- 1812 Bowood House, Wiltshire, design of central block (continued by William Atkinson)
- pre-1813 Designs for the City Observatory and National Monument, on Calton Hill, Edinburgh later redesigned by William Henry Playfair
- 1813 Bellahouston House, opened in 1823

=== Writings ===
- Stark, W. (1807). Remarks on the Construction of Public Hospitals for the Cure of Mental Derangement. Glasgow, 1807. 2nd edn. (1810). James Hedderwick and Co. for the committee: Glasgow.
- Stark, W. (1814). Report to the Right Honourable the Lord Provost, Magistrates, and Council of the City of Edinburgh, and the Governors of George Heriot's Hospital... On the Plans for Laying out the Grounds for Buildings between Edinburgh and Leith. Edinburgh: Printed by A. Smellie. Republished as 'Report on the Plans for Laying out the Grounds for Buildings between Edinburgh and Leith by the Late William Stark, Esq. Architect' with a 'Postscript by a Friend, Mr Craig, Architect, Glasgow', The Scots Magazine, Vol LXXVII, August 1815.
