= Horton Road Hospital =

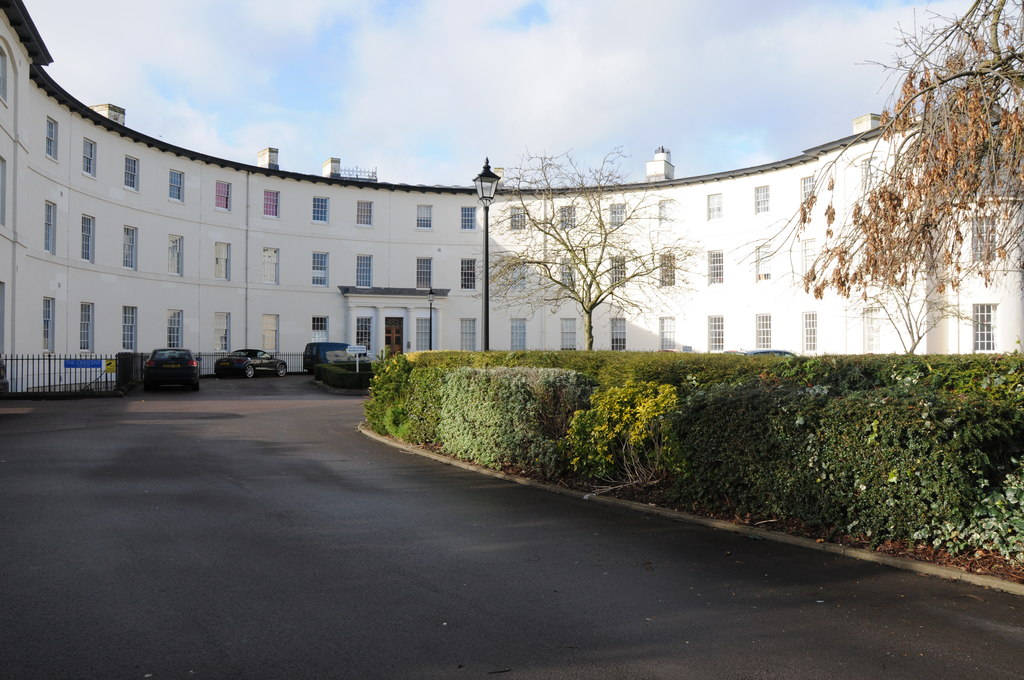
- Horton Road Hospital

- Shown in Gloucestershire

Geography
- Location: Gloucester, Gloucestershire, England
- Coordinates: 51.8653°N 2.2284°W

Organisation
- Care system: NHS
- Type: Specialist

Services
- Emergency department: N/A
- Speciality: Psychiatric Hospital

History
- Founded: 1823
- Closed: 1988

Links
- Lists: Hospitals in England

The Horton Road Hospital was a mental health facility in Horton Road, Gloucester, England.

== History ==
The hospital, which was designed by William Stark (who died before the hospital was fully designed), John Wheeler (who also died before the hospital was fully designed) and John Collingwood using a radial plan layout, opened as the First Gloucestershire County Asylum in July 1823. The west wing was extended in 1846.

The facility joined the National Health Service as the Horton Road Hospital in 1948. In the early 1970s the Horton Road Hospital released land on the west of its site to facilitate the construction of the Gloucestershire Royal Hospital. After the introduction of Care in the Community in the early 1980s, the hospital went into a period of decline and closed in March 1988. The main building was converted to apartments in 2005.

== See also ==
- Coney Hill Hospital (also known as Second Gloucestershire County Asylum)
