= Allen Bathurst, 1st Earl Bathurst =

British politician

The Right Honourable The Earl Bathurst PC
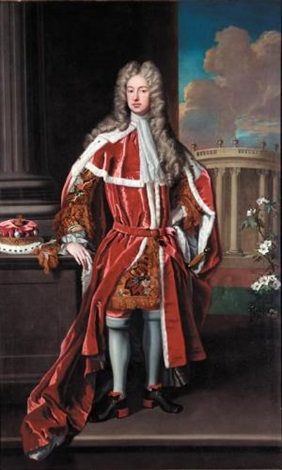
- Portrait by Godfrey Kneller

Captain of the Gentlemen Pensioners
- In office 1742–1744
- Preceded by: The Duke of Bolton
- Succeeded by: The Lord Hobart

Personal details
- Born: 16 November 1684
- Died: 16 September 1775 (aged 90)
- Spouse: Catherine Apsley (m. 1704)
- Children: Henry Bathurst, 2nd Earl Bathurst
- Parent(s): Sir Benjamin Bathurst; Frances Apsley
- Education: Trinity College, Oxford

Allen Bathurst, 1st Earl Bathurst, PC (16 November 1684 – 16 September 1775), of Bathurst in the County of Sussex, known as The Lord Bathurst from 1712 to 1772, was a British Tory politician. Bathurst sat in the English and British House of Commons from 1705 until 1712 and then in the British House of Lords until his death in 1775, after being raised to the peerage as Baron Bathurst.

== Early life ==
Bathurst was the eldest son and heir of Sir Benjamin Bathurst, and his wife, Frances Apsley, daughter of Sir Allen Apsley, of Apsley, Pulborough, Sussex, and Frances daughter of John Petre of Bowhay, Devon. He belonged to a family which is said to have settled in Sussex before the Norman Conquest. He was born in St James's Square, Westminster and christened at St James's Church in the precincts of the royal palace. His father was heavily involved in the slave trade through the Royal African Company and the East India Company, and through this accumulated enough wealth to endow all three of his sons with landed estates. Allen Bathurst inherited Cirencester Park from his father, and built the present house between 1714 and 1718.

Bathurst matriculated at Trinity College, Oxford on 13 May 1700. He succeeded his father on 27 April 1704. In July 1704, he married his first cousin Catherine Apsley, daughter of Sir Peter Apsley and his wife Catherine Fortrey, daughter of Samuel Fortrey and sister of William Fortrey.

== Parliament ==
At the 1705 English general election, Bathurst was elected Member of Parliament for the borough of Cirencester in the Country Tory interest. At the 1708 British general election, he was returned again for Cirencester but the election was declared void on 10 December 1709. He was returned again in the contested re-election on 23 December 1709. At the 1710 British general election, he was returned in a contest without problems. He was highly active under the Tory administration. On 1 January 1712, as one of eleven others he was raised to the peerage by Queen Anne as Baron Bathurst, of Battlesden in the County of Bedford and vacated his seat in the House of Commons to sit in the House of Lords.

As a zealous Tory he defended Francis Atterbury, Bishop of Rochester, and in the House of Lords was an opponent of Sir Robert Walpole. Careful never to engage in Jacobite plots, for example, he condemned Sir John Fenwick's conspiracy, Bathurst remained largely remote from politics during Walpole's tenure as prime minister.

After Walpole left office, Bathurst was made a Privy Councillor on 13 July 1742 and served as Captain of the Honourable Corps of Gentlemen Pensioners from 1742 to 1744. He was subsequently appointed Treasurer to Frederick, Prince of Wales after the heir to the throne had fallen out with King George II and been banned from Kensington Palace. Bathurst was responsible for managing the Prince's chaotic finances until his death in 1751. Upon the accession of George III, Frederick's son, as King in 1760, Bathurst secured an annual pension of £2,000 on the heavily taxed Irish establishment.

In August 1772, 60 years after he was elevated to the peerage, Bathurst was created Earl Bathurst, of Bathurst in the County of Sussex, with remainder to the heirs male of his body

== Artistic interests ==
Apart from his political career, Lord Bathurst is also known for his association with the poets and scholars of the time. Alexander Pope, Jonathan Swift, Matthew Prior, Laurence Sterne, and William Congreve were among his friends.

In 1719 he was one of the original backers of the Royal Academy of Music, establishing a London opera company which commissioned numerous works from Handel, Bononcini and others.

Bathurst's name is listed as a founding governor on the royal charter of the Foundling Hospital, granted by King George II in 1739. He is described in Sterne's Letters to Eliza; was the subject of a graceful reference on the part of Burke speaking in the House of Commons; and the letters which passed between him and Pope are published in Pope's Works, vol. viii. (London, 1872).

== Later life and legacy ==
Lord Bathurst's wife, Catherine, died in 1768. He survived her by seven years and died in September 1775, aged 90. He was buried in Cirencester church. They had four sons and five daughters, including Frances, wife of the future MP William Wodehouse. His son Henry succeeded him in the earldom, having already been created Lord Apsley in 1771 on his appointment as Lord Chancellor.

Bathurst's sister was the mother of Admiral Sir Thomas Pye. His brother Henry Bathurst served as Bishop of Norwich and his niece was Caroline de Crespigny, a poet who some claim to be one of Lord Byron's many mistresses.

== Notes ==
Parliament of Great Britain
Preceded by Charles Coxe; William Master	Member of Parliament for Cirencester; 1705–1712; With: Henry Ireton 1705–1708; Charles Coxe 1708–1712	Succeeded by Charles Coxe; Benjamin Bathurst
Political offices
Preceded by The Duke of Bolton	Captain of the Gentlemen Pensioners; 1742–1744	Succeeded by The Lord Hobart
Peerage of Great Britain
New creation	Earl Bathurst; 1772–1775	Succeeded by Henry Bathurst
New creation	Baron Bathurst; 1712–1775	Succeeded by Henry Bathurst
