= Viscount Allen =

Viscount Allen, in the County of Kildare, was a title in the Peerage of Ireland. It was created on 28 August 1717 for John Allen, who had earlier represented County Dublin, County Carlow and County Wicklow in the Irish House of Commons. He was made Baron Allen, of Stillorgan in the County of Dublin, at the same time, also in the Peerage of Ireland. Both his son, the second Viscount, and grandson, the third Viscount, sat in the Irish House of Commons. The third Viscount was succeeded by his cousin, the fourth Viscount. He was the son of the Honourable Richard Allen, younger son of the first Viscount. Lord Allen was also a member of the Irish House of Commons. He died unmarried and was succeeded by his younger brother, the fifth Viscount. He represented Eye in the British House of Commons. His son, the sixth Viscount, fought in the Peninsular War. He was unmarried and the titles became extinct on his death on 21 September 1845.

Sir Joshua Allen (died 1691), father of the first Viscount, was Lord Mayor of Dublin.

== Viscounts Allen (1717) ==
- John Allen, 1st Viscount Allen (1661–1726)
- Joshua Allen, 2nd Viscount Allen (1685–1742)
- John Allen, 3rd Viscount Allen (1713–1745)
- John Allen, 4th Viscount Allen (died 1753)
- Joshua Allen, 5th Viscount Allen (1728–1816)
- Joshua William Allen, 6th Viscount Allen (c. 1782–1845)
