= Society of Writers to His Majesty's Signet =

Professional body of Scottish solicitors

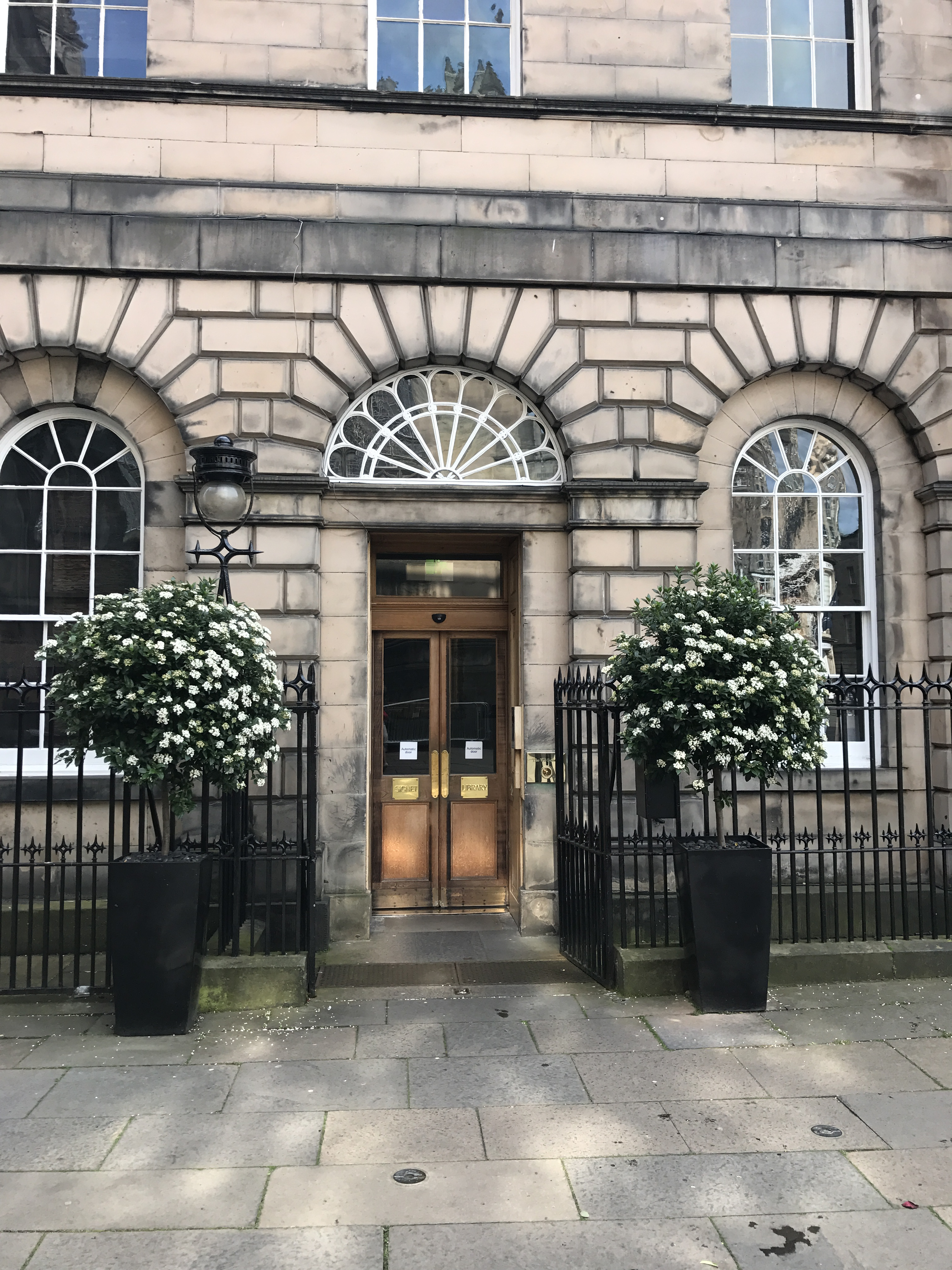
- Abbreviation: WS Society
- Formation: 1594
- Type: Professional body
- Purpose: Promotion of standards in legal services
- Headquarters: Signet Library
- Location: Edinburgh
- Coordinates: 55°56′56.80″N 3°11′29.91″W
- Region served: Scotland
- Keeper of the Signet: Lady Elish Angiolini
- Main organ: Council
- Parent organization: College of Justice
- Website: www.wssociety.co.uk

The Society of Writers to His Majesty's Signet is a private society of Scottish solicitors, dating back to 1594 and part of the College of Justice. Writers to the Signet originally had special privileges in relation to the drawing up of documents required to be signeted, but these have since disappeared and the society is now an independent, non-regulatory association of solicitors. The society maintains the Signet Library, part of the Parliament House complex in Edinburgh, and members of the society are entitled to the postnominal letters WS.

== History ==
Solicitors in Scotland were previously known as "writers"; Writers to the Signet were the solicitors entitled to supervise use of the King's Signet, the private seal of the early Kings of Scots. Records of that use date back to 1369. In 1532, the Writers to the Signet were included as members in the newly established College of Justice, along with the Faculty of Advocates and the clerks of the Court of Session. The society was established in 1594, when the King's Secretary, as Keeper of the Signet, gave commissions to a Deputy Keeper and 18 other writers.

Writers to the Signet began as clerks to the Keeper of the Signet, and were afforded the privileges of freedom from taxation by the Burgh of Edinburgh, exemption from military duty, and rights of audience before the bar of the College of Justice. Writers were involved in drawing up summonses to the Court of Session. Writers were, however, de jure prohibited from acting as procurators but de facto this was often ignored.

In 1599 it was proposed that the Faculty of Advocates and the Society of Writers be merged into a single organisation, but the writers were against it. Such an idea was again proposed in 1633, but the Writers again opposed it.

In civil actions in the Court of Session a pursuer is required to have his writ stamped with the Signet to give him authority from the monarch to serve the writ on the defender. That conferral, called "passing the Signet", was previously carried out by the Signet Office, the administration of which was one of the society's responsibilities. In 1976 the Signet Office was merged into the General Department of the Court of Session and the society was relieved of any responsibility for it. Nevertheless, the requirement of "passing the Signet" survives.

== Signet Library ==
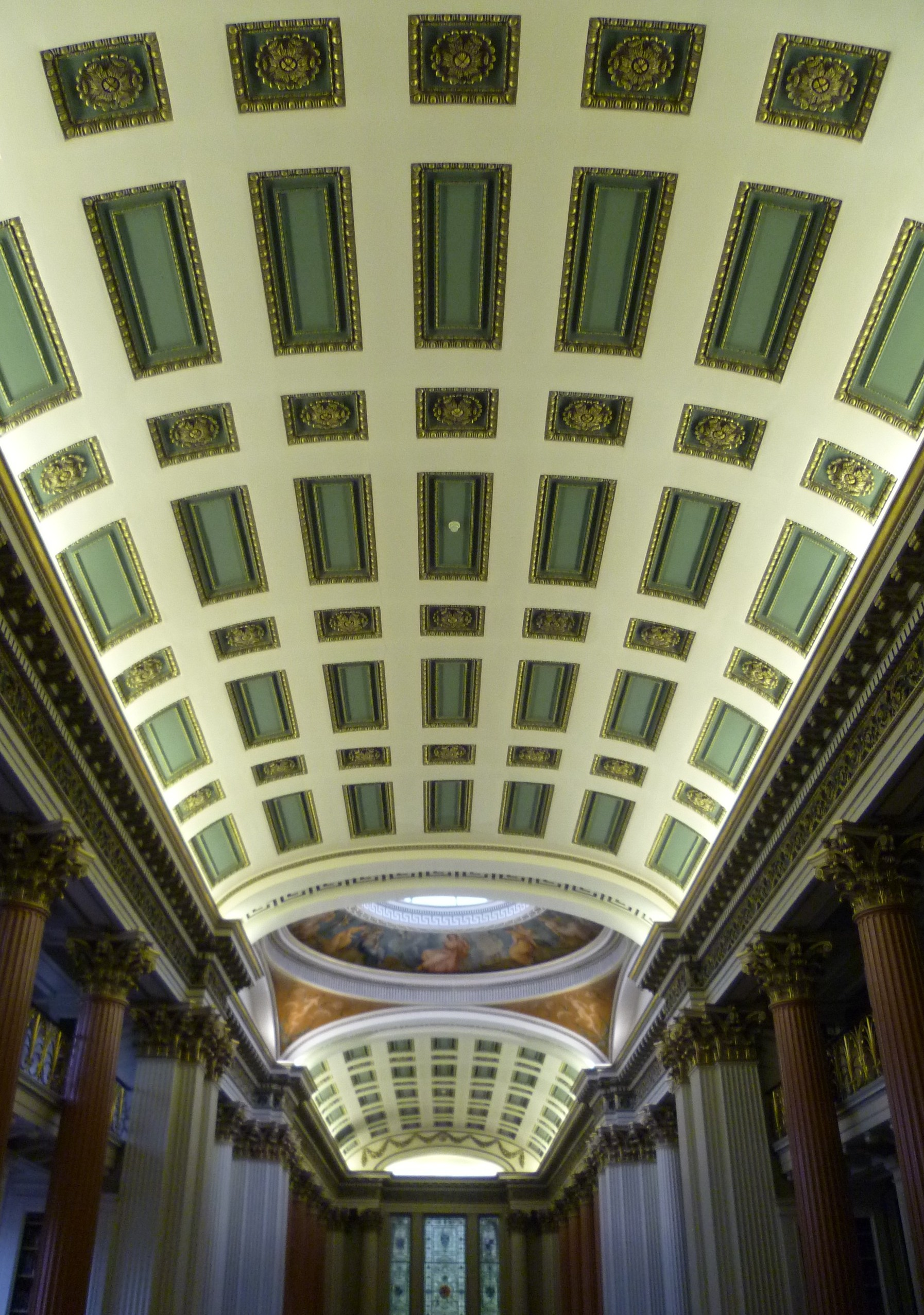
Ceiling of the Signet Library

The Signet Library was designed by Robert Reid with interiors by William Stark. It was finished in 1822 in time for the visit to Edinburgh of George IV. William Henry Playfair and William Burn were also involved in working on the building. The building is a classical masterpiece and is a category A listed building.

== Today ==
The society has become an independent professional body of solicitors. Its stated purpose is "promoting the highest standards in legal services" through the provision of education services including the Professional Competence Course (PCC) and courses in continuing professional development (CPD).

== Keeper of the Signet ==
The Keeper of the Signet is one of the Great Officers of State of Scotland, and is one of the offices held by the Lord Clerk Register under the Public Offices (Scotland) Act 1817 (57 Geo. 3. c. 64), s 5. The current Keeper of the Signet is Lady Elish Angiolini, former Lord Advocate of Scotland.

The office is now a purely ceremonial one, as the Keeper of the Signet grants a commission to the Principal Clerk of Session to allow the Signet to be used. The Keeper of the Signet is the senior officer of the Society of Writers to the Signet and issues commissions to new members. Although the society is a private body, the Register of Commissions forms part of the records of the Court of Session, held by the National Archives of Scotland. The Keeper does not exercise administrative functions over the society, these being delegated to the Deputy Keeper. The present Deputy Keeper is Amanda Laurie WS.

== Associate membership ==
Jurists, advocates and foreign lawyers may be granted associate membership of the society. Associate members are entitled to use the designation: "Associate Writer to the Signet" with the postnominal letters, AWS. Prominent associate members include Harvey McGregor KC and the late former President of Poland, Lech Kaczyński.

== See also ==
- Edinburgh City Chambers
