= Nether Lypiatt Manor =

Country house in Gloucestershire, England

Coordinates: 51°43′57.5″N 2°11′2.5″W

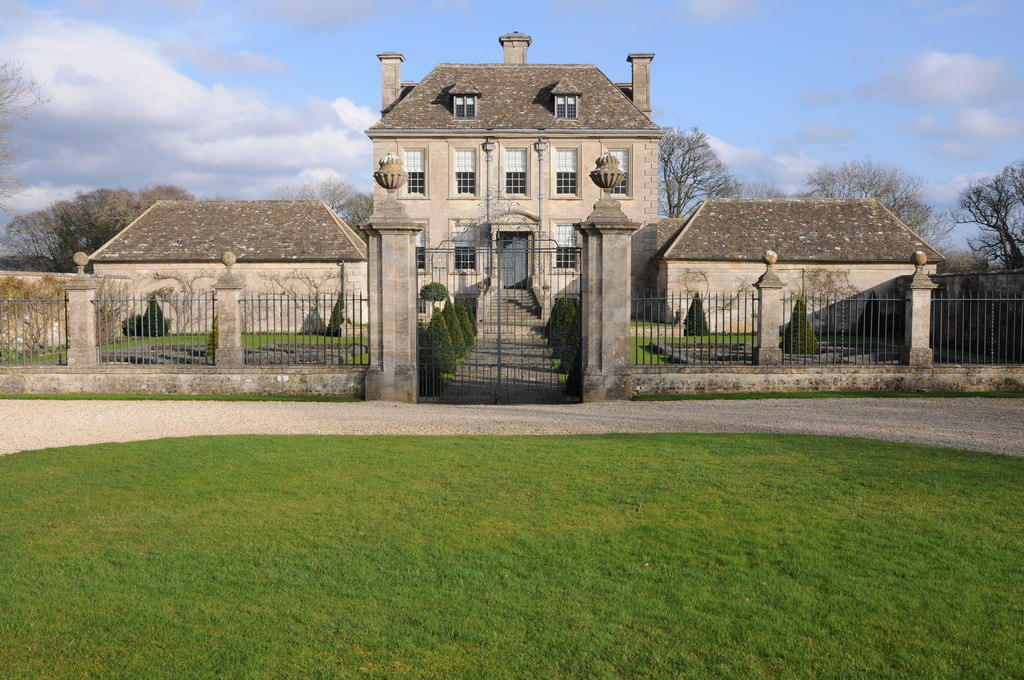
- Nether Lypiatt Manor is in Gloucestershire, England Nether Lypiatt Manor (England) Nether Lypiatt Manor (the United Kingdom) Nether Lypiatt Manor (Europe) Nether Lypiatt Manor

Nether Lypiatt Manor is a compact, neo-Classical manor house in the mainly rural parish of Thrupp, near Stroud in Gloucestershire, England. It was formerly the country home of Prince and Princess Michael of Kent and is a Grade I listed building.

== Description ==
Built in the early 1700s by an unknown architect for Judge Charles Coxe, with one wing added in 1931 by Morley Horder, the small house forms a perfect square of 46 feet (14 m) on each side, with sash windows, tall chimneys, hipped roofs and gate piers and railings. The attic storey with dormers was removed in 1844, but replaced by Horder c. 1923. It has been praised by architectural historian Mark Girouard as perfectly exemplifying the early 18th-century formal house in miniature. The house, in 35 acres (14 ha) of grounds, has four reception rooms, eight bedrooms, and four bathrooms. It comprises four floors, including a tall basement and an attic floor. Inside, much of the early 18th-century panelling survives, as do original stone fireplaces. A fine staircase runs from basement to attic.

The garden designer Rosemary Verey worked on the gardens of Nether Lypiatt for Prince and Princess Michael of Kent. The grounds have recently been re-developed with a series of new gardens, including a refurbished traditional flower garden in keeping with the original arts and crafts backbone of vistas and hedges.

== History ==
On the death of Thomas Freame in 1689, his estate at Nether Lypiatt was divided between his two co-heiresses. One, Anne Chamberlayne, obtained the previous house, which stood near to the present house. Her daughter Catherine married judge Charles Coxe (1656–1728), MP for Cirencester and later Gloucester, and circuit judge in Wales. They inherited the house in 1699 and built the present house in the early 1700s. Their son John inherited the house in 1728 after which it passed down in his family until 1914 (though, from 1884, occupied by tenants), when it was bought by Arthur Stanton. He sold it to Mr Corbett Woodall, who commissioned architect Peter Morley Horder to recondition the house, installing bathrooms and planting the avenue of lime trees to the south.

In 1923, it was bought by Gordon Woodhouse (heir to a Marsala fortune) and his wife, the harpsichordist Violet Gordon Woodhouse, who lived in a menage a cinq. They added the north-west pavilion and improved the interior. After Gordon's death in 1951, the property passed to Captain John Gwynne, a nephew of Violet. In 1956–57, Frederick Nettlefold, with Jeremy Benson as his architect, lifted and completely rebuilt the roof in strict accordance with the original plan, after an 1848 inaccurate re-roof.

In 1980, it was bought by Prince and Princess Michael. Other members of the British royal family also lived near Prince and Princess Michael at Nether Lypiatt. Anne, Princess Royal lived at nearby Gatcombe Park, and King Charles III lived at Highgrove House near Tetbury.

== Sale ==
In 2005, Nether Lypiatt Manor was put up for sale. The agent was originally asking for offers in excess of £6 million, but by February 2006 this had been lowered to £5.5 million. According to The Sunday Times, it was purchased by the businessman and Labour life peer Lord Drayson for £5.75 million. The property was put up for sale again in 2023, launching in Country Life on 31 May at a price of £11 million.
