= Frances Apsley =

English courtier

Frances Apsley (c. 1653 – 7 June 1727), later Lady Bathurst, was a maid of honour to the future Queen Mary II of England and her younger sister, the future Queen Anne, the daughters of the Duke and Duchess of York. She was the daughter of Sir Allen Apsley and his wife, the former Frances Petre.

Letters written to her by a sentimental adolescent Princess Mary reveal that she idolised Frances Apsley. Whilst there are some historians who believe the writings to be evidence of Mary's homosexuality, most historians disagree; Mary's marriage to William of Orange was a happy one and she seems to have been deeply in love with her husband. She did, however, maintain a platonic friendship with Frances, who married Sir Benjamin Bathurst, via ongoing correspondence. Their son was Allen Bathurst, 1st Earl Bathurst.
