= John Blanch =

English politician

John Blanch (c. 1649 – 10 July 1725), of Wotton Court, near Gloucester and Eastington, Gloucestershire, was a clothier and English politician.

== Family ==
His parentage is unknown. His first wife was Mary (died 1686), daughter of Richard Cambridge of Woodchester, clothier, by whom he had a daughter Mary. In 1688 he married Hannah, the daughter of William Mew, rector of Eastington. His daughter Mary married Thomas Horton.

== Career ==
He was a vociferous advocate for the local cloth trade, lobbying politicians and publishing a pamphlet The Interest of England Consider'd in an Essay Upon Wool (1694). He was a Member (MP) of the Parliament of Great Britain for Gloucester from 1710 to 1713.
