= Peter Bathurst (Eye MP) =

- Born: 8 January 1723
- Died: 20 December 1801 (aged 78)
- Education: University College, Oxford
- Spouse: Elizabeth Evelyn (m. 1750)
- Relatives: Peter Bathurst (father)
- Military career
- Allegiance: United Kingdom
- Branch: British Army
- Service years: 1759–1801
- Rank: General
- Unit: 85th Regiment of Foot
- Conflicts: Seven Years' War

Member of Parliament for Eye
- In office 1784–1790
- In office 1792–1795

General Peter Bathurst (8 January 1723 – 20 December 1801) was the member of Parliament for the constituency of Eye between 1784 and 1790, and between 1792 and 1795 and a strong supporter of Pitt the Younger.
