= Mayor of Gloucester =

Civic office in Gloucester, England

The Mayor of Gloucester is the first citizen of the City of Gloucester, England, and acts as chair of the council. The Mayor represents the Council and the City at civic, ceremonial and community events both inside the City boundaries and elsewhere.

The first recorded mayor of Gloucester was Richard the Burgess, who derived his authority from a royal order in 1228. No further use of the title is recorded until the Letters Patent of Richard III in October 1483, whereby the burgesses of Gloucester were given the right to elect their first mayor. The first mayor to be so elected was John Trye.

== Prior to 21st century ==
- 1501–02: John Cooke, mercer; also 1507-08, 1512–13 and 1519–20
- 1503–04: William Hanshaw, bellfounder; also 1508-09, 1509–10 and 1515-16
- 1504–05: William Cole
- 1505–06: Garret Vanecke (also recorded as Gerard Vanecke)
- 1506–07: Thomas Telowe (also recorded as Taylowe); also 1513-14 and 1522-23
- 1511–12: Thomas Porter; also MP for Gloucester (1515)
- 1516–17: Ralph Sankey
- 1523–24: William Hasard
- 1524–25: John Rawlins; also MP for Gloucester (1529)
- 1532: William Matthews; also 1538
- 1534–35: John Falconer (notable for hosting the visit of Henry VIII and Anne Boleyn to Gloucester during a royal tour of the West Country in 1535).
- 1536–37: Sir Thomas Bell the Elder; also 1544-45, 1547, 1553–54; also MP for Gloucester (1545–47, 1547–52, 1553 and 1554–55)
- 1543–44: Thomas Bell the Younger
- 1546–47: Thomas Loveday; also 1555-56; also MP for Gloucester (1553, 1554)
- 1552–53: Thomas Payne
- 1565–66: Thomas Semys; also 1578-79 and 1599-1600; also MP for Gloucester (1572)
- 1566-67: John Woodward
- 1567-68: Henry Kinge
- 1568-69: John Kirbie; also 1576-77
- 1569-70: William Massinger; also 1585-86; also MP for Gloucester (1554, 1555 and 1571)
- 1570-71: Luke Garnons; also 1586-87, 1600–01
- 1571-72: Thomas Wicks
- 1572-73: Peter Rumney
- 1573-74: Richard Cugley
- 1574-75: Thomas Francomb
- 1575-76: James Morse
- 1579–80: Thomas Machen; also 1588-89, 1601–02; also MP for Gloucester (1613; 1614)
- 1580-81: Thomas Lane
- 1581-82: John Smith
- 1582-83: Lawrence Holliday
- 1583-84: Thomas Best
- 1587-88: John Cowdale
- 1589-90: John Browne
- 1590-91: Richard Webb; also 1595-1596
- 1591-92: Richard Cox; also 1602-03
- 1592-93: Robert Walkely
- 1593-94: John Taylor
- 1594-95: Henry Hassard
- 1596-97: Grumbald Hitchins
- 1597–98: John Jones; also 1618-19, 1625–26; also MP for Gloucester (1604)
- 1598–99: Christopher Caple; also 1619-20; also MP for Gloucester (1625, 1626)
- 1603-04: Thomas Riche
- 1604-05: Henry Hassard
- 1605-06: Henry Darby
- 1606-07: Lawrence Wilshire
- 1607-08: John Baughe
- 1608-09: John Brewster
- 1609-10: John Thorne
- 1610–11: John Browne; also 1621–22, 1634–35; also MP for Gloucester 1614, 1621, 1624, 1625, 1626, 1628)
- 1611-12: William Hill; also 1622-23
- 1612-13: Thomas Addams
- 1613-14: John Tailor
- 1614-15: Edmond Clements; also 1623–24
- 1615-16: Richard Smith
- 1616-17: Galfridus Beale
- 1620-21: John Baugh
- 1624-25: Richard Smyth
- 1626-27: Matthew Price
- 1627-28: Richard Beard, mercer
- 1629–30: Anthony Robinson; also MP for Gloucester (1621, 1624)
- 1632: Thomas Teysam
- 1633: William Hall
- 1634: Charles Jaye
- 1635: William Laurence
- 1637–38: William Singleton; also MP for Gloucester (1640)
- 1638: William Hawkins
- 1638: John Clarke
- 1639: Thomas Machin
- 1640: Edmund Watts
- 1642: John Walker
- 1644: James Roberts
- 1645–46: Laurence Singleton; also MP for Gloucester (1659)
- 1646: William Smythe
- 1647: Fardinando Shawe
- 1648: John Edwards
- 1649: Joseph Atkines
- 1649–50: James Stephens; also MP for Gloucester (1656, 1659, 1660)
- 1650: Josias Edmonds
- 1651: Samuel Woodward
- 1651–52: William Singleton
- 1652-53: Thomas Pearce; also 1659, 1664
- 1653–54: Thomas Pury; also MP for Gloucester (1640–1659)
- 1654: Charles Smyth
- 1655: Thomas Nelmes
- 1656: Richard Tratman
- 1657: Robert Streate
- 1658: Thomas Laurence; also 1674-75
- 1660: Thomas Yate
- 1660: David Pretchett
- 1662: Richard Pallmer
- 1662: George Lewes
- 1663: John Morris
- 1665: John Smythe
- 1667: John Collins
- 1669: Daniell Cromes
- 1671: John Nelme
- 1672–73: Henry Norwood; also MP for Gloucester (1675)
- 1673-74: Samuel Cowle
- 1675–76: William Selwyn; also MP for Gloucester (1698-1701); also Governor of Jamaica (1702)
- 1676: Maurice Attwood
- 1676: Nathaniel Lawrence
- 1678: Thomas Beavan
- 1690–91: Sir John Guise, 2nd Baronet; also MP for Gloucestershire (1681, 1689–1695)
- 1692–93: Robert Payne; also 1703-04; also MP for Gloucester (1695–98)
- 1727–28: John Selwyn; also 1734-35; also MP for Gloucester (1734–51)
- 1736–37: Charles Selwyn; also MP for Gloucester (1728–34)
- 1758–59: George Augustus Selwyn; also 1765-66; also MP for Gloucester (1754–80)
- 1770–71: John Webb; also 1776–77, 1786–87; also MP for Gloucester (1780–95)
- 1818–19: Ralph Fletcher; also 1828-29
- 1858-59: Richard Helps, solicitor
- circa 1893: J.A. Matthews
- 1901–02: Samuel Bland (also notable as the founder of the Gloucester Citizen newspaper)
- 1902-03: Alderman E. Sidney Hartland
- 1919-23: John Owen Roberts; also 1928-29
- 1923-24: Charles Edward Gardner
- 1924-25: Fredrick William Duart-Smith
- 1925-26: William Jones
- 1926-27: Douglas Edward Finley
- 1927-28: William Charles Matthews
- 1929-30: Sydney John Gillett; also co-mayor 1931-32
- 1930-31: William Russel Eggerton
- 1931-32: Alfred Daniels & Sydney John Gillett
- 1932–33: William Levason Edwards
- 1933–34: Theodore Hannam-Clarke
- 1937-43: Gilbert Trevor Wellington
- 1954-55: Howard A. Gibson
- 1955-56: E. J. Langdon
- 1956-67: M. G. Lewis
- 1958: Gordon Edgar Payne
- 1964-65: W. J. Lewis
- 1965–66: Lilian Embling (the first female mayor of Gloucester)
- 1969-70: Leslie Robert Jones
- 1971–72: Keith Fisher
- 1990-91: Anthony Potts; also April 1995-May 1995 (interim)
- 1994-February 1995: Anthony Workman
- 1998–99: Janet Lugg

== 21st century ==
- 2000–01: Terry Haines
- 2001–02: Rose Workman
- 2002–03: Pamela Tracey
- 2003–04: Phillip McLellan
- 2004–05: Geraldene Gillespie
- 2005–06: Lise Noakes
- 2006–07: Sue Blakeley
- 2007–08: Harjit Singh Gill (Gloucester’s first mayor of Asian descent)
- 2008–09: Norman Ravenhill
- 2009–10: Chris Witts
- 2010–11: Jan Lugg
- 2011–12: Andy Lewis
- 2012–13: David Brown (husband of future mayor Joanne Brown)
- 2013–14: Chris Chatterton
- 2014–15: Deb Llewellyn
- 2015–16: Sebastian Field
- 2016–17: Neil Hampson
- 2017–18: Steve Morgan
- 2018-19: Joanne Brown (wife of former mayor David Brown)
- 2019-20: Colin Organ
- 2020-21: Kate Haigh (elected at a virtual meeting due to restrictions caused by the 2020 COVID-19 pandemic)
- 2021-22: Collette Finnegan
- 2022-23: Howard Hyman
- 2023-24: Kathy Williams
- 2024-25: Lorraine Campbell
- 2025-26: Ashley Bowkett
- 2026-: Adrian Graham
