= John Jones (MP for Gloucester) =

English politician and MP

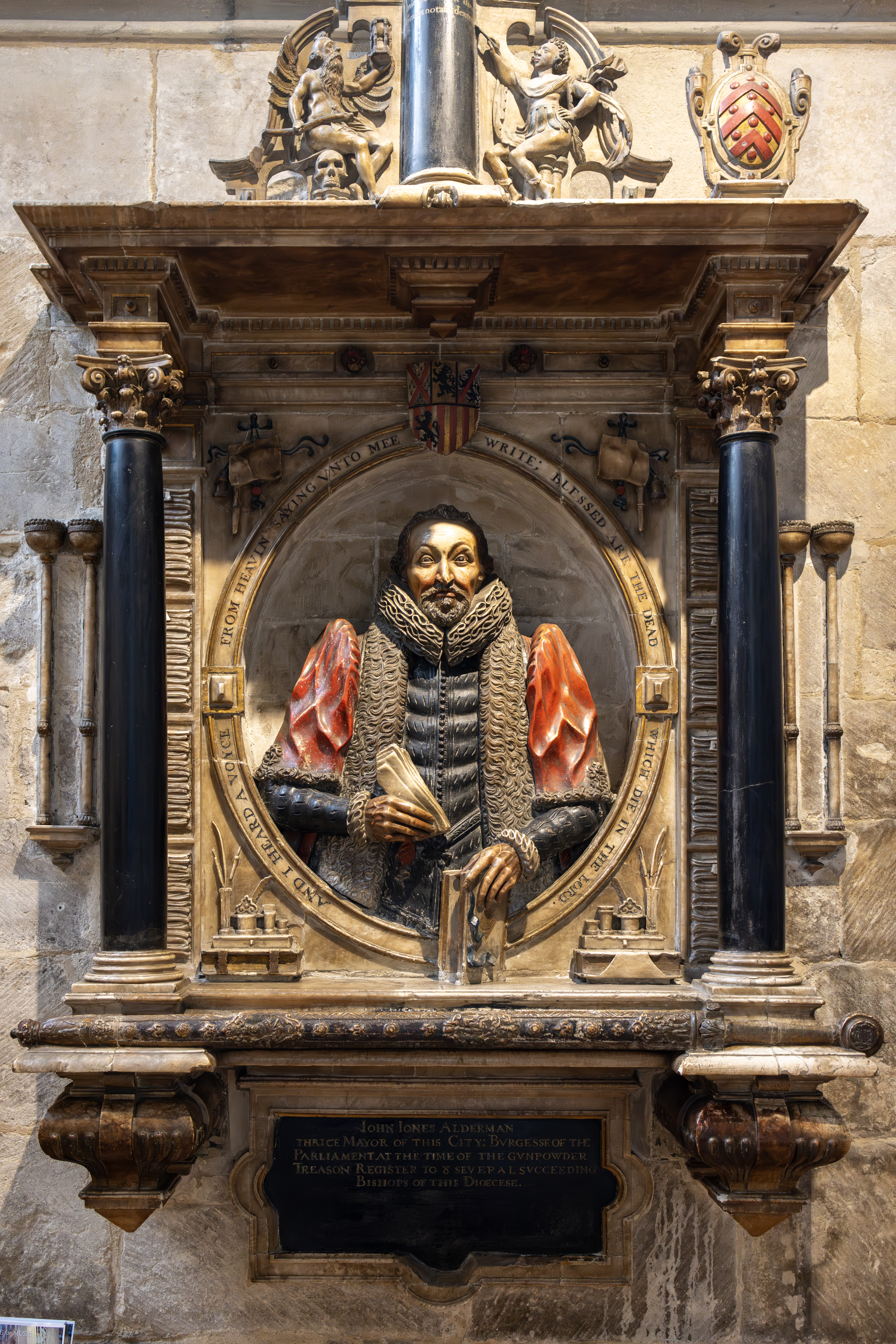
Memorial to John Jones in Gloucester Cathedral

John Jones (died 1 June 1630) was an English politician who sat in the House of Commons from 1604 to 1611.

Jones was the son of Hugh Joanes of Mitton, a Worcestershire hamlet north-east of Tewkesbury, Gloucestershire. He first appears in the records of Gloucester cathedral as a public notary at the 1576 episcopal visitation. He was the Principal Registrar of the diocese of Gloucester covering the time of eight Bishops of Gloucester from Richard Cheyney to Godfrey Goodman. He leased a house known as the 'Old Workhouse and the Old School House' (now the Parliament House) from the dean and chapter, but as it remained ruinous at his death he presumably sublet it and lived elsewhere. He was an alderman of Gloucester and was Sheriff of Gloucester in 1587 and 1592 and Mayor of Gloucester in 1597. He was also J.P. for the City. In 1604 he put himself forward as a prospective Member of Parliament for Gloucester. Although he was not endorsed by his fellow aldermen or the common council, he was elected through a direct appeal to the electorate and the support of the sheriff. He was mayor of Gloucester again in 1618 and 1625.

Jones died in 1630 and was buried in Gloucester Cathedral.

Jones married firstly Joane Huntley widow born as Weale. She died on 18 January 1595 and he married secondly Elizabeth Gilbert daughter of J. Gilbert of Clare, Suffolk.

Parliament of England
Preceded by William Oldsworth; Luke Garnons	Member of Parliament for Gloucester; 1604–1611; With: Nicholas Overbury	Succeeded by Thomas Machen; John Browne
