= River Leadon =

River in Herefordshire and Gloucestershire, England

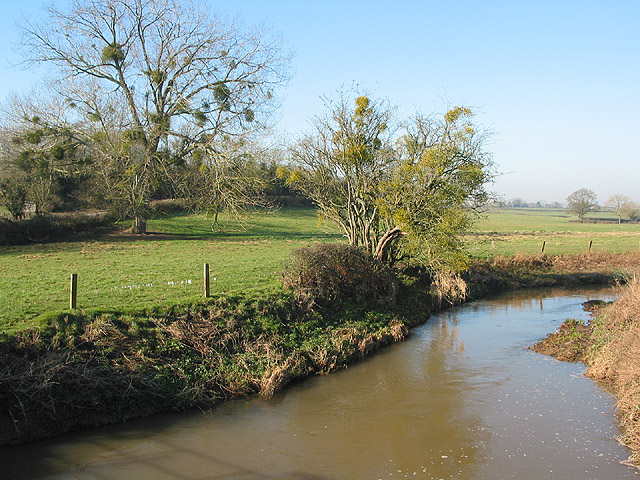
- The Leadon from Wedderburn Bridge

- Discharge location within Gloucestershire

Location
- Country: England
- Counties: Gloucestershire, Herefordshire

Physical characteristics
- Source
  - location: Acton Beauchamp
  - coordinates: 52.1390°N 2.4645°W
  - elevation: 155 m (509 ft)
- Mouth
  - location: River Severn
  - coordinates: 51.8778°N 2.2675°W
- Length: 51.4 km (31.9 mi)
- Discharge
  - location: Wedderburn Bridge
  - average: 2.0 m^{3}/s (71 cu ft/s)

The River Leadon (/ˈlɛdɒn/) is a river in Herefordshire and Gloucestershire, England, a tributary of the River Severn. It rises just south of the village of Acton Beauchamp, and flows south past Bosbury to the town of Ledbury, which takes its name from the river. It then flows south and east past Dymock, Upleadon and Highleadon to join the Severn at Over, just west of Gloucester. The river is approximately 32 miles (51 km) long.

The name is of Celtic origin, and means "broad stream".

In the Middle Ages, the Leadon flowed in two branches for the last two miles. The main stream, known as the New Leadon, flowed south of Over to join the river south of Over Bridge. The river was prone to flooding, and to alleviate the problem the river was diverted in 1867 to flow along the branch previously known as the Old Leadon, and now the only course of the river, flowing into the Severn north of Over.

The Herefordshire and Gloucestershire Canal was built through the valley of the Leadon in 1795, and converted into the Ledbury and Gloucester Railway in the 1880s.
