= John Hanbury =

John Hanbury may refer to:

- John Hanbury (1664–1734), English industrialist, patented the tinplate rolling process
- John Hanbury (1744–1784), Welsh industrialist and grandson of John Hanbury (1664–1734)
- John Hanbury (hurler) (born 1993), hurler for Galway
- John Hanbury (MP) (1574–1658), English politician

== See also ==
- John Hanbury-Williams (1859–1946), Major-General
