= John Lenthall (Roundhead) =

English politician (c. 1625–1681)

Sir John Lenthall (c. 1625–1681) was an English Member of Parliament. He was elected MP for Gloucester in 1645, knighted by Oliver Cromwell in 1658 and made Governor of Windsor Castle from 1657 to 1660. After the 1660 Restoration of the Monarchy, he served as Sheriff of Oxfordshire for 1672–73 and knighted a second time by Charles II in 1677.

Sir John Lenthall by Sir Peter Lely

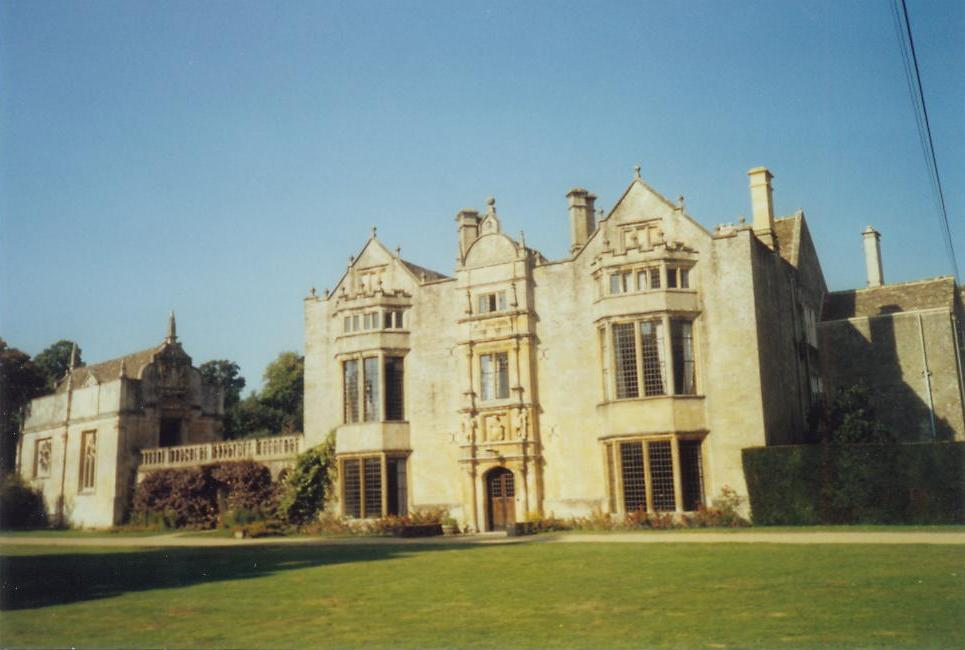
Burford Priory

== Biography ==
John Lenthall was the only surviving son of William Lenthall, Speaker of the House of Commons, and his wife, Elizabeth, daughter of Ambrose Evans of Loddington in Northamptonshire. At the age of 14 he matriculated at Corpus Christi College, Oxford on 12 September 1640 and entered Lincoln's Inn the same year.

Lenthall was elected Member of Parliament for Gloucester in 1645.

He was one of the judges appointed for the trial of Charles I, but did not participate in the trial. He was one of the Six Clerks in Chancery, 9 March 1657. He was made Governor of Windsor Castle in 1657 and was knighted by the Lord Protector Oliver Cromwell on 9 March 1658. (Note: Mark Noble records that the Lord Protector granted John Lenthal a baronetcy, but give no date for the honour. It is not clear how Mark Noble drew this conclusion, and having reviewed the sources, including Masson's Life of Milton and the [old] Parliamentary History (vol. xxi, p. 220), George Cokayne concluded that Nobel was mistaken.) On 18 January 1660 he was made colonel of a regiment of foot.

In 1660 Lenthall was returned to the Convention Parliament for Abingdon, but was expelled from the house on 12 May 1660. In 1662 he succeeded his father to his Burford Priory and Besselsleigh estates and in 1672 was selected Sheriff of Oxfordshire. As his Cromwellian knighthood was not recognised after the Restoration King Charles II knighted him a second time at Whitehall on 13 March 1677.

He died at Besselsleigh on 9 November 1681, and was buried in the parish church at Besselsleigh in Berkshire (now Oxfordshire), adjoining his country estate. Wood terms him "the grand braggadocio and liar of the age he lived in".

== Family ==
His first wife was Rebecca, daughter of Thomas Bennet, an alderman of London. After her death, he married Mary Bluett, a daughter of Sir John Bluett (d.1634) of Holcombe Rogus in Devon and widow of Sir James Stonhouse, Bt. They had three children: William, his successor, John and James (died 1686). Lenthall's third wife was Catherine, daughter of Eusebius Andrews, of Edmonton, Middlesex. They had no children.

== Notes ==
Parliament of England
Preceded by William Singleton; Henry Brett	Member of Parliament for Gloucester; 1645; With: Thomas Pury, senior	Succeeded by Gloucester was unrepresented in the Barebones Parliament
Preceded by Laurence Singleton; James Stephens	Member of Parliament for Gloucester; 1659; With: Thomas Pury, senior	Succeeded by Sir Edward Massey; James Stephens
