= Old Crown Inn =

Former public house in the United Kingdom

Coordinates: 51°52′01″N 2°14′58″W

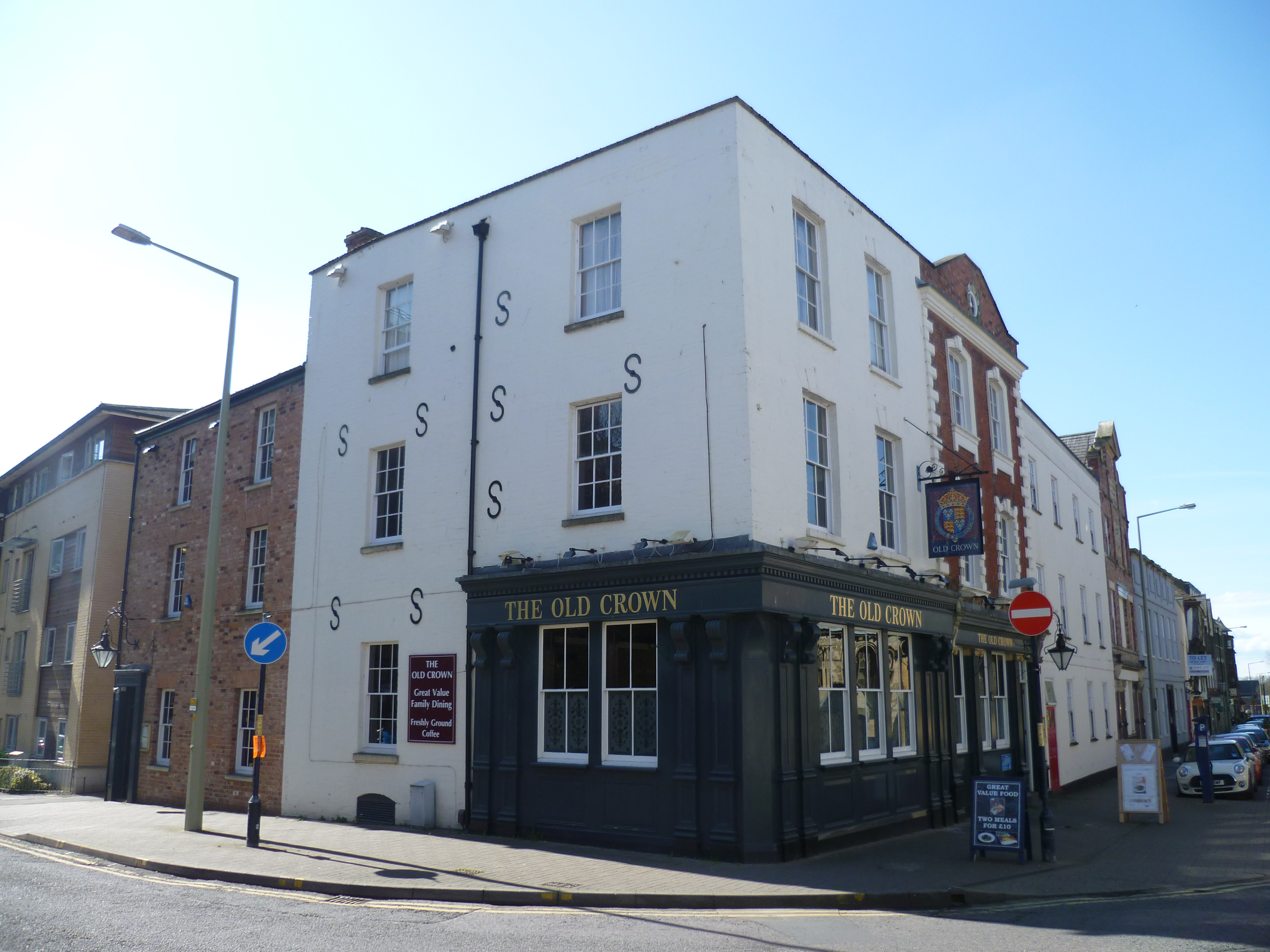
The Old Crown Inn

The Old Crown Inn was a grade II listed pub house at 81 and 83 Westgate Street, Gloucester.

The pub closed in early 2024.
