= Westgate Galleria =

Coordinates: 51.86890°N 2.25409°W

The Westgate Galleria are grade II listed almshouses in Westgate Street, Gloucester, now used as a small shopping centre. The building dates from 1787 to 1790 when it was built by William Price for the City of Gloucester on the former site of St Bartholomew's Hospital which had been founded in the early 12th century.
