= Gloucester County and West of England Industrial Exhibition =

1950 exhibition in Gloucester, England

Coordinates: 51.8680°N 2.2631°W

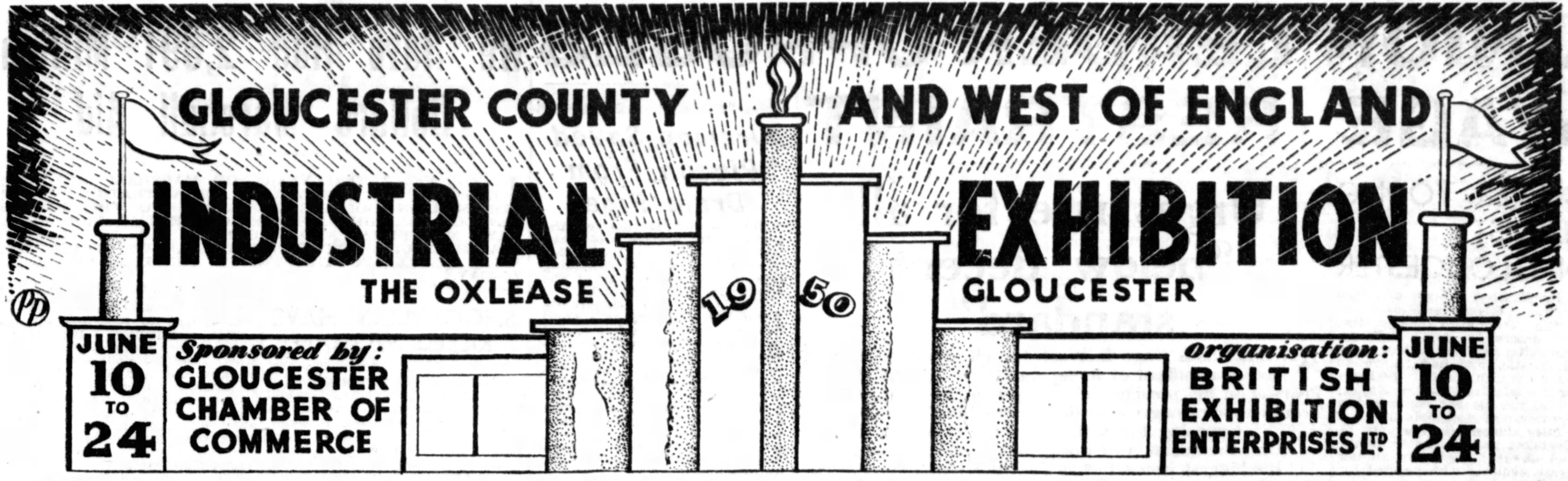
Gloucester County and West of England Industrial Exhibition logo

The Gloucester County and West of England Industrial Exhibition was held on the Oxleaze in the City of Gloucester from 10 to 24 June 1950. It was designed to showcase the industrial manufacturing of Gloucester and the west of England as Britain recovered from the effects of the Second World War and was advertised as the largest show of its kind ever held in the west of England and second only nationally to Birmingham's British Industries Fair.

== Background ==
The show was sponsored by the Gloucester Chamber of Commerce and organised by British Exhibition Enterprises Ltd. It was designed to showcase the industrial manufacturing of Gloucester and the west of England as Britain recovered from the effects of the Second World War and was advertised as the largest show of its kind ever held in the west of England, second only nationally to Birmingham's British Industries Fair.

== Features ==
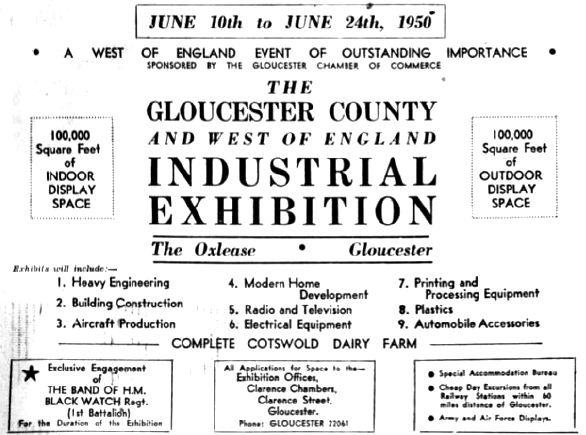
Advertising for the Gloucester County and West of England Industrial Exhibition

The show was held on the Oxleaze, an area of open ground on Alney Island to the west of the city between Port Ham and Castle Meads and bounded by the River Severn on both sides. It ran from 10 to 24 June 1950 and was opened by the mayor Mr W. Garrett. It boasted 100,000 square feet of indoor space and as much again outside that covered an area of 27 acres.

The official programme depicted barges in the main basin of Gloucester Docks on the cover with a jet engine overhead that referenced the city's connections with the aviation industry, primarily through the Gloster Aircraft Company, and thus joined old and new. The band of the first battalion Black Watch Regiment was retained for the duration of the show and rail excursions were organised from all stations within 60 miles of Gloucester. The attendance was 200,000.

== Exhibitors and features ==
Around one-third of the exhibitors were said to be from the City of Gloucester with many more from the rest of the county of Gloucestershire, and the remainder from further afield. The show featured:

- A complete Cotswold dairy farm covering 2.5 acres and costing £2,000.
- A shop-window display competition.
- A television theatre where early TV sets were on display.

Companies exhibiting included:

- R. A. Lister of Dursley, manufacturers of engines.
- Impregnated Diamond Products Limited, manufacturers of grinding tools incorporating diamond dust.
- Rotol, manufacturer of propellers based near Gloucester which was subsequently acquired by Dowty.
- Dowty, manufacturer of aircraft components founded by a former employee of Gloster Aircraft Company
- John Stephens, Son and Co.
- Gloucester Railway Carriage and Wagon Company.
