= The Fountain Inn, Gloucester =

Pub in Gloucester, Gloucestershire, England

Coordinates: 51.866°N 2.248°W

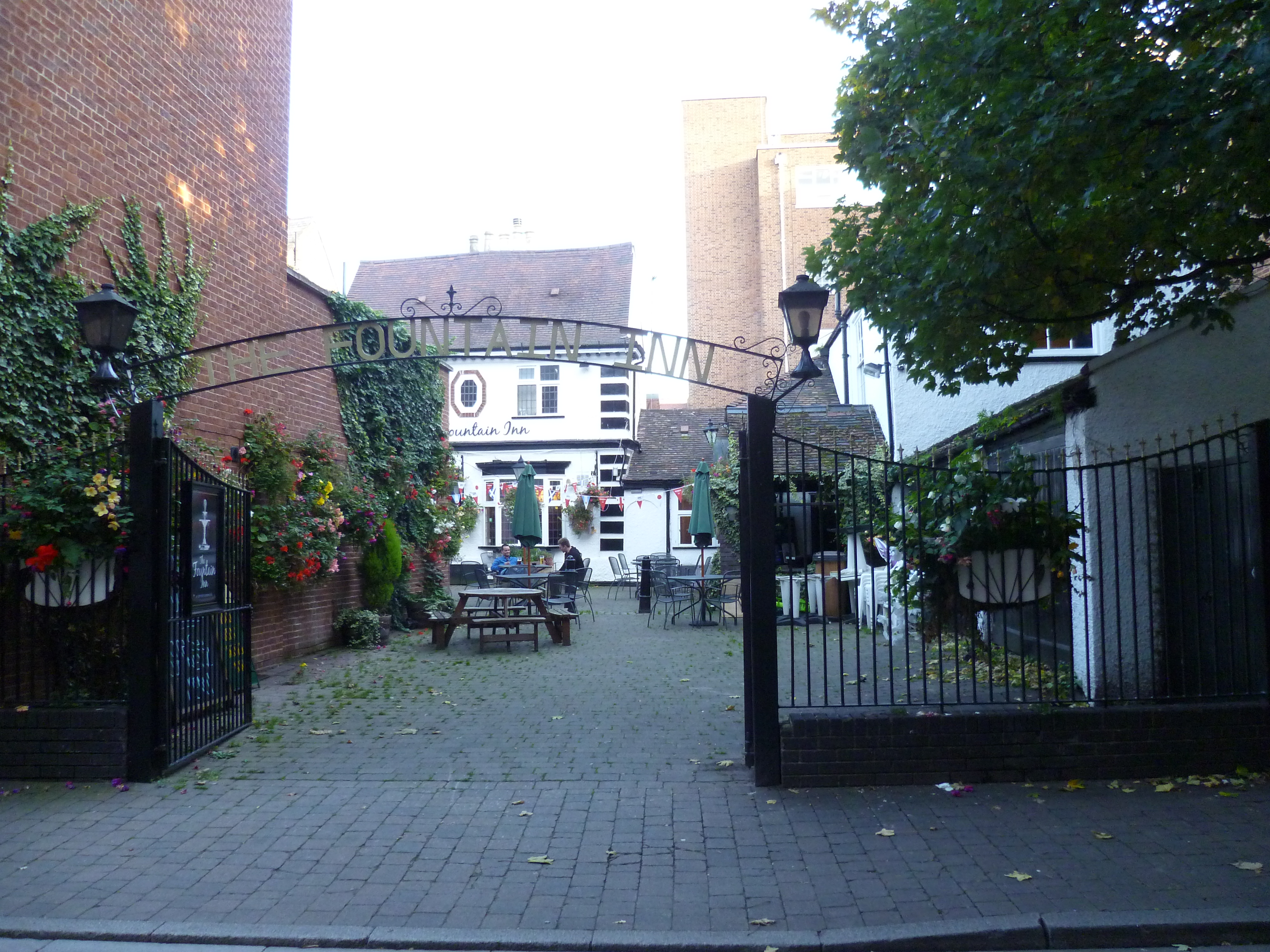
The Fountain Inn

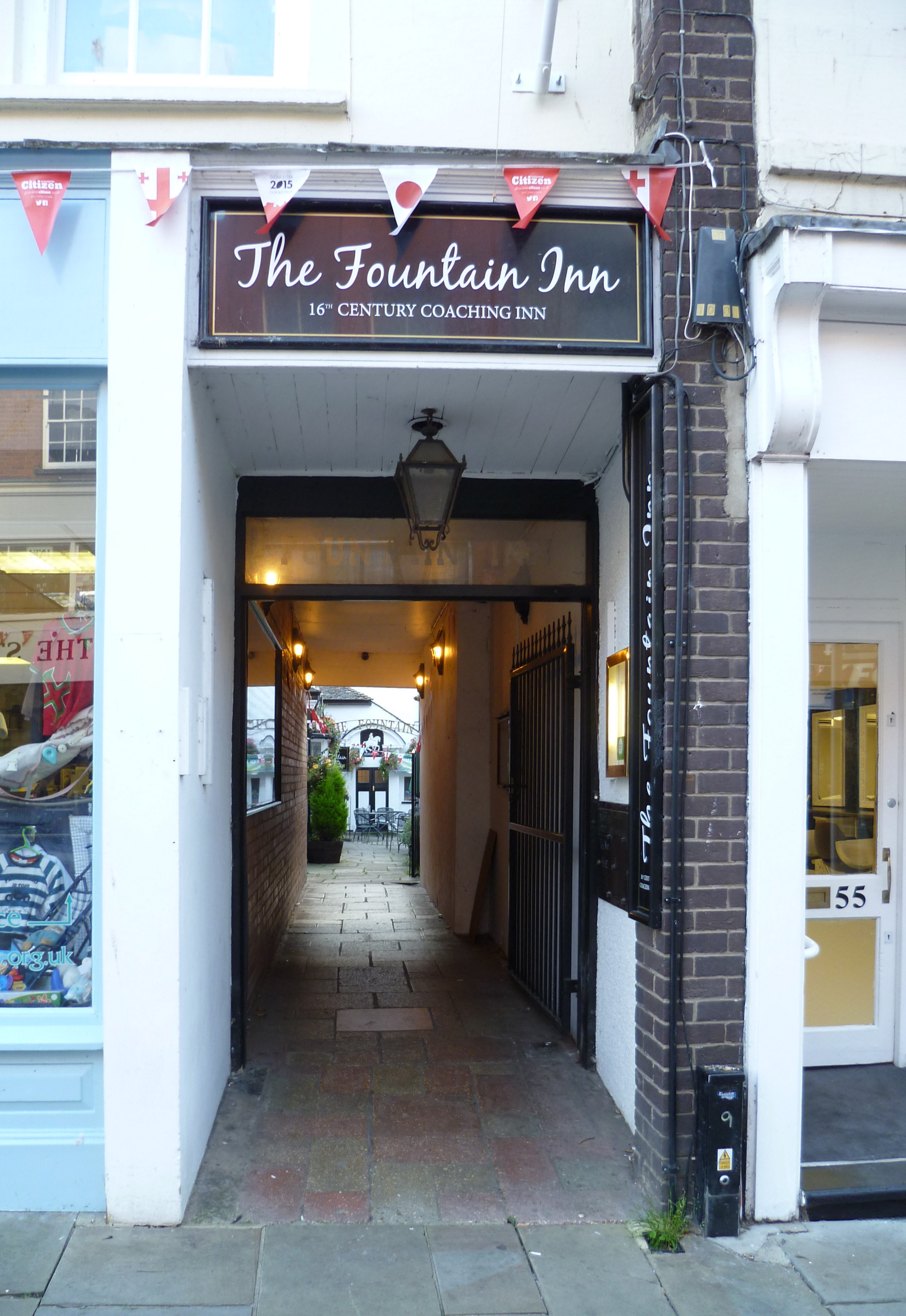
Entrance to The Fountain Inn from Westgate Street.

The Fountain Inn is a grade II listed pub at 53 Westgate Street, Gloucester, England. It is mentioned in an Abbey Rental document of 1455. Some of the building is from the late 16th century but it was mostly rebuilt in the late 17th century, altered in the 18th century, and remodelled around 1900.
