= Lower George Hotel =

Hotel in Gloucester, Gloucestershire, England

Coordinates: 51°52′03″N 2°15′03″W

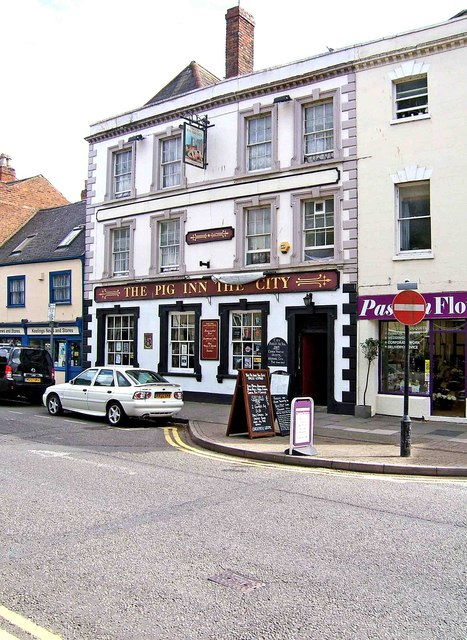
Lower George Inn whilst Pig Inn the City

The Lower George Hotel, now the Lower George Inn, is a grade II listed building at 121 Westgate Street, Gloucester.

For some time the building was home to the 'Pig Inn the City', which closed in 2011. After refurbishment it has opened again under its original name.
