= Laurence Singleton =

English politician

Laurence Singleton was an English politician who sat in the House of Commons in 1659.

Singleton may have been the brother of William Singleton MP for Gloucester in 1640 and hence son of Thomas Singleton, merchant of London and Gloucester. He was Sheriff of Gloucester in 1634. He was elected as an alderman in 1643 and served as mayor of Gloucester in 1645.

In 1659, Singleton was elected Member of Parliament for Gloucester in the Third Protectorate Parliament. He was appointed a militia commissioner for Gloucester on 9 August 1659. He was removed from the city council in 1662.

Singleton married Joan Robinson, daughter of Alderman Anthony Robinson.

Parliament of England
Preceded by Thomas Pury; James Stephens	Member of Parliament for Gloucester; 1659; With: James Stephens	Succeeded by John Lenthall
