= Evan Seys =

Welsh lawyer, politician, and antiquarian (died c. 1685)

Evan Seys (alternates: Yevan or Ievan) (c. 1604–1685) was a lawyer who rose to national office under Oliver Cromwell as Attorney General, and served as a member of parliament after the Restoration. From c.1649 until his death he was involved in the politics of his native Glamorgan, and of Gloucestershire. He was a committed and active Protestant and an antiquarian scholar.

== Family and education ==
Seys was the fourth son of Richard Seys of Swansea, Glamorgan and his wife Mary Evans. His father was a barrister of Lincoln's Inn. In 1638 Evan married Margaret, daughter of Robert Bridges of Woodchester, who died in 1651. He had a son, Richard, and daughters Margaret and Elizabeth.

Evan attended Cowbridge School until the age of 17, when in 1621 he went up to Christ Church, Oxford.

== Political and legal career ==
Seys was Recorder of Gloucester in 1649 and a Bencher of Lincoln's Inn in 1652. He went on to hold legal office in Wales under the Protectorate and was a member of the committee for governing Glamorgan. This culminated in his becoming the Attorney General to Oliver Cromwell and serving as MP for Glamorgan during the evanescent rule of Richard Cromwell in 1659.

In 1659 he was part of a broad coalition preparing the restoration of Charles II. From 1661 to 1681 he was MP for Gloucester. He lived in the substantial house in the cathedral close built by Abraham Blackleech.

== See also ==
- Article on Evan Seys by Clive Jenkins

Parliament of England
Preceded by Philip Jones; Edmund Thomas	Member of Parliament for Glamorgan; 1659	Succeeded by Not represented in Restored Rump
Preceded by Sir Edward Massey; James Stephens	Member of Parliament for Gloucester; 1661–1681; With: Sir Edward Massey 1661–1675; Henry Norwood 1675–1679; William Cooke 1679; Sir Charles Berkeley 1679–1681	Succeeded by Sir Charles Berkeley; Lord Herbert
