= St Mary de Lode Church, Gloucester =

Grade I listed church in Gloucester, United Kingdom

Coordinates: 51.8685°N 2.2492°W

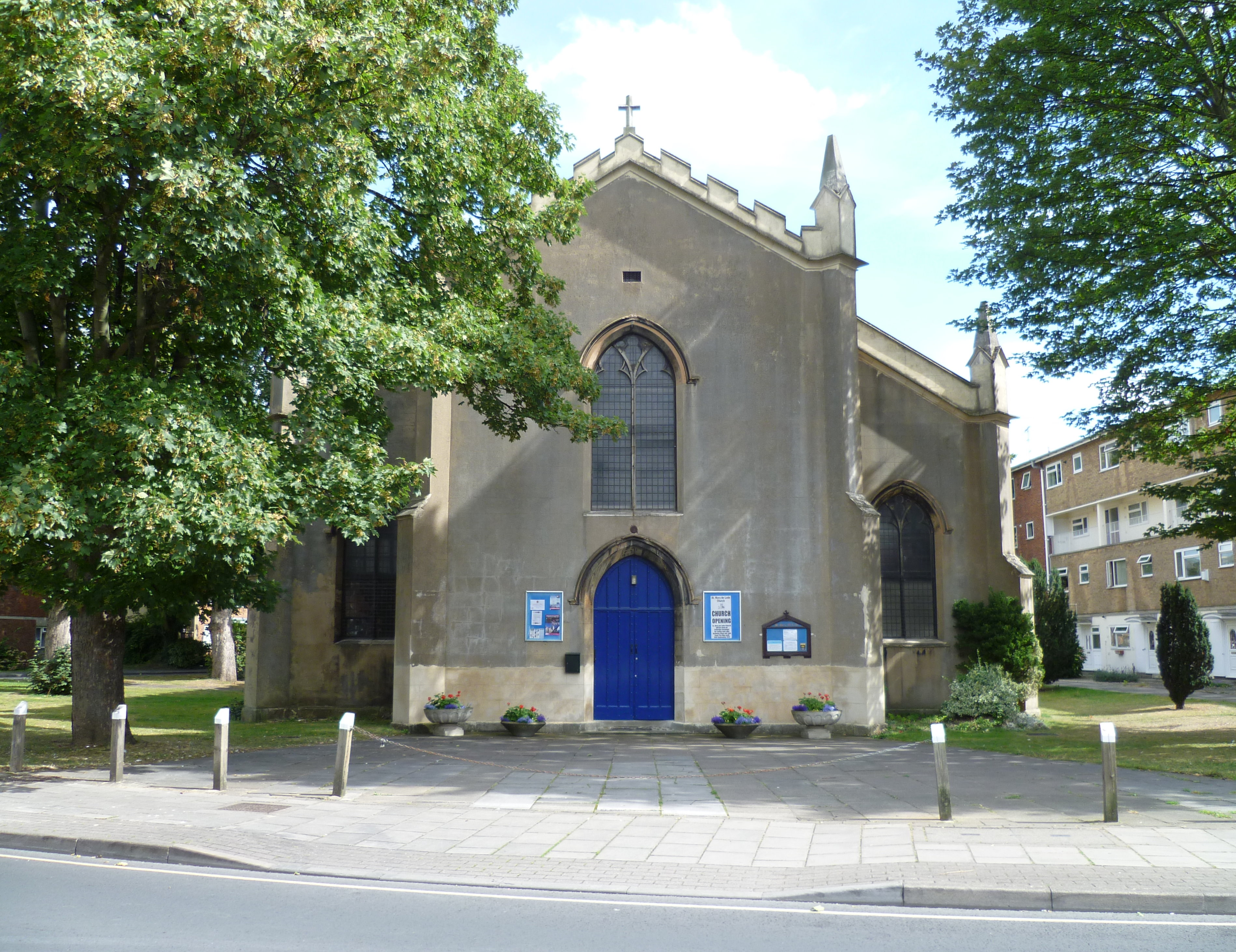
St Mary de Lode from Archdeacon Street.

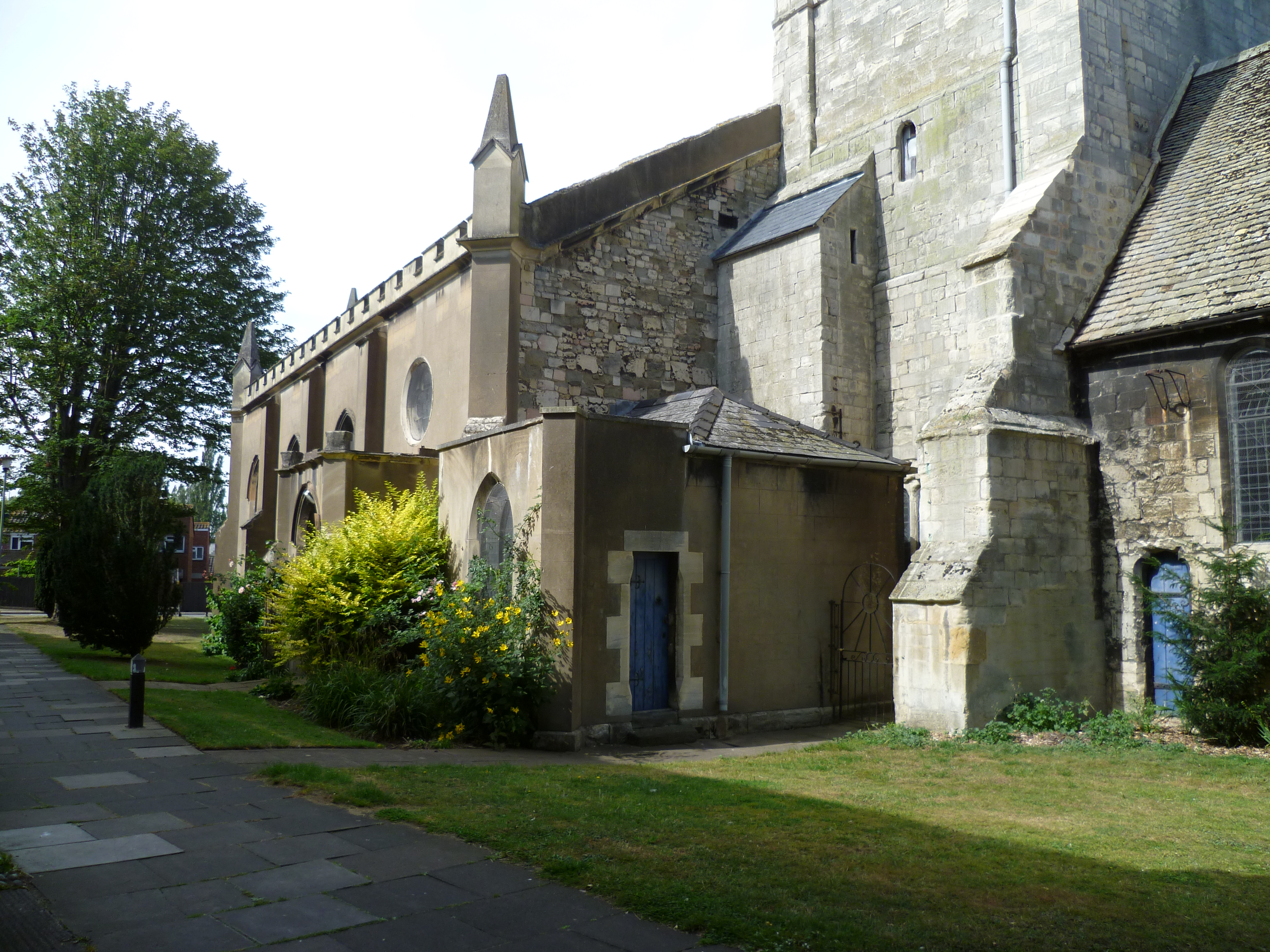
St Mary de Lode, south side.

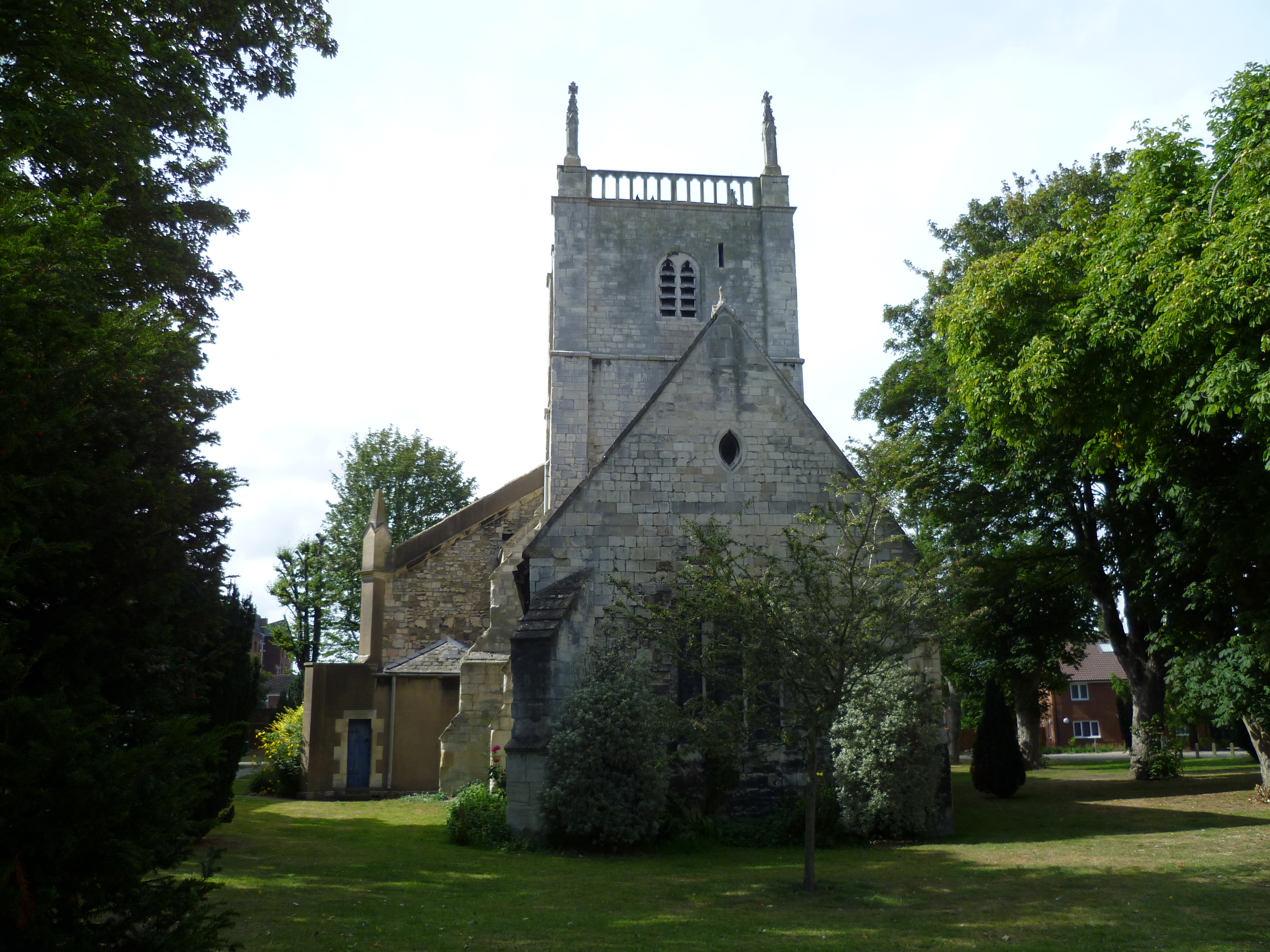
St Mary de Lode Church, from St Mary's Square.

St Mary de Lode Church is a Church of England church immediately outside the grounds of Gloucester Cathedral. It is believed by some to be on the site of the first Christian church in Britain. The church is in the Diocese of Gloucester and Grade I listed by English Heritage. It has also been known as St. Mary Before the Gate of St. Peter, St. Mary Broad Gate and St. Mary De Port.

== History ==
The word "Lode" is from the old English word for water course or ferry and in this case it refers to a ferry that once crossed a branch of the River Severn to the west of the church, which no longer exists.

In 1979, archaeological excavations in the nave showed that the church is built over two Roman buildings. The first, probably a baths building erected in the second century, was destroyed in the fifth century and replaced by a timber mausoleum containing three burials. The mausoleum was destroyed by fire and followed by a sequence of buildings interpreted as churches, culminating in the medieval church of St Mary. It is suggested that the original church was a post-Roman British foundation, before the Anglo-Saxons occupied this area.

The earliest reference to a church in written records dates from the late eleventh century. It then comprised a nave, chancel and tower which was destroyed by fire in 1190. A new chancel was built in the thirteenth century.

A local legend, first recorded in the eighteenth century, holds that the church was the burial place of the legendary King Lucius, first Christian king of Britain, who was said to have established a bishopric in Gloucester in the second century A.D. This legend combined with the results of the archaeological work has apparently inspired the local belief that the church was built on the site of an ancient Roman temple, and was the first Christian church in Britain.

A tomb effigy in the north wall of the chancel formerly pointed out as marking the grave of King Lucius is of fourteenth-century date, and shows a tonsured priest, perhaps William de Chamberleyn who was vicar in 1302–5.

In March 1643 and also in 1646, during the English Civil War, the church was used as a prison to hold royalist soldiers captured by Sir William Waller and Lieut. Col. Edward Massey.

== Architecture ==
The church has a Norman central tower of about 1190. The nave was rebuilt in 1826 in early Gothic Revival style with cast iron columns, by James Cooke, a local monumental mason. A Norman arch leads from the nave into the tower, which is barrel-vaulted and connected through a thirteenth-century arch with the chancel. The chancel was begun like the tower in about 1190 but extended and vaulted in the thirteenth century. Further restorations to the church took place in the nineteenth and early twentieth centuries, and the west part of the nave was converted for use as a church hall in 1980. There is an octagonal pulpit, apparently made up of fifteenth-century carved wooden panels, and an eighteenth-century organ brought in 1972 from the now-redundant church of St Nicholas, Westgate Street.

There are stained glass windows commemorating the Royal Gloucestershire Hussars and the Gloucester poet Ivor Gurney.

In the grounds is a monument to Bishop John Hooper, who was burnt at the stake in Gloucester.

== Today ==
St Mary de Lode remains a functioning church with regular services and a Sunday School. The parish is now combined with those of St Swithun's, Hempsted, and St Mary de Crypt.

The church is the regular venue for concerts by the Gloucester Music Society.

== See also ==
- Grade I listed buildings in Gloucestershire
