= Thomas Loveday =

16th-century English politician

Thomas Loveday (by 1513 – 28 August 1558) was an English politician.

He was a member (MP) of the parliament of England for Gloucester in October 1553 and April 1554. He was Mayor of Gloucester in 1546–47 and 1555–56.
