= John Rawlins (MP) =

English politician

John Rawlins (by 1493 – 10 October 1532) was an English politician.

He was a member (MP) of the parliament of England for Gloucester in 1529. He additionally served as the Mayor of Gloucester prior to this in 1524–25.

Princess Mary visited Gloucester in September 1525 accompanied by her ladies and gentlewomen. She was met by the mayor, John Rawlins, at Quedgeley.
