= Christopher Caple =

English mercer and politician

Christopher Caple or Capell (c. 1559 – 1626) was an English mercer and politician who sat in the House of Commons in 1625 and 1626.

Caple was a younger son of Edward Capell of Sollers Hope, Herefordshire and became a mercer at Gloucester. He was made sheriff of Gloucester in 1594 and became an alderman in 1598. He was Mayor for 1598–99, 1619–20 and 1621–22. In 1625, he was elected Member of Parliament for Gloucester. He was re-elected MP for Gloucester in 1626, but died in office in May of that year.

He had a reputation for non-conformity. On his death he left a communion cup to his parish church on his death.

His first wife was Grace, the daughter of Richard Hand, with whom he had 3 sons, including Richard Caple, and a daughter Anne, who married John Hanbury. His second wife was Ellen, the daughter of Richard Hill of Dymock, Gloucestershire and widow of William Lane of Gloucester.

Parliament of England
Preceded by Anthony Robinson; John Browne	Member of Parliament for Gloucester; 1625–1626; With: John Browne	Succeeded by John Hanbury; John Browne
