= Edward Massey =

English soldier and politician

Sir Edward Massey KB, JP, FRS
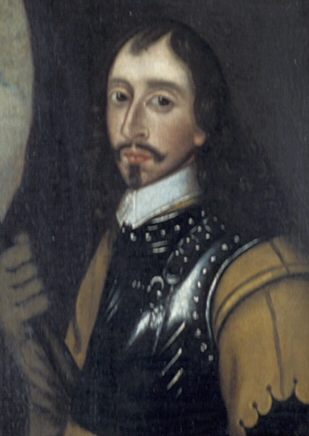
- Sir Edward Massey

Privy Council of Ireland
- In office 1661 – 1674 †

Member of Parliament for Gloucester
- In office April 1660 – May 1674

Member of Parliament for Wootton Bassett
- In office June 1646 – December 1648 (Note: Excluded by Pride's Purge)

Parliamentarian Governor of Gloucester
- In office 1642–1645

Personal details
- Born: c. 1619 Coddington, Cheshire
- Died: 1674, age 52-54 Abbeyleix, Ireland

Military service
- Rank: General
- Battles/wars: Thirty Years War; Wars of the Three Kingdoms; Siege of Gloucester; Battle of Ledbury; Taunton; Inverkeithing; Worcester; Booth's Uprising

Sir Edward Massey, also spelt Massie, (c. 1619–1674) was an English soldier and politician from Cheshire, who sat in the House of Commons at various times between 1646 and 1674. He fought for Parliament in the First English Civil War, when he became famous for his defence of Gloucester. Although he remained loyal during the 1648 Second English Civil War, Massey switched sides following the Execution of Charles I in January 1649, and served under his son Charles II during the Anglo-Scottish war (1650–1652). Badly wounded at Worcester in September 1651, he was captured but managed to escape, and rejoin the exiled Stuart court in the Dutch Republic.

During the Interregnum, he was active in the Royalist cause, and in 1659 took part in Booth's Uprising, centred on his home county of Cheshire. After the Stuart Restoration in May 1660, he was knighted and sat as MP for Gloucester until his death. Appointed to the Privy Council of Ireland in 1661, he spent much of his time on his estate at Abbeyleix, where he died sometime in 1674.

A modern biographer has said of him that "Massey rose from obscurity through a mixture of outstanding qualities of military leadership, courage, sheer luck, and a talent for self-publicity. However, he was also rigid, self-righteous, humourless, and...unable to work with others...character defects that meant he never really scaled the military and political heights".

== Early life ==
Edward Massey was the fifth son of John Massey of Coddington, Cheshire and his wife Anne Grosvenor, daughter of Richard Grosvenor of Eaton, Cheshire. He may have been a London apprentice before serving in the Dutch army against the armies of Philip III of Spain, who ruled the Spanish Netherlands (see Dutch Revolt). In 1639, he appears as a captain of pioneers in the army raised by Charles I of England to fight against the Scots. At the outbreak of the English Civil War, he was with the King at York, but he soon joined the Parliamentary army.

== Parliamentary soldier ==
As lieutenant colonel under the Earl of Stamford, Massey became deputy governor of Gloucester, where he remained till towards the end of the First Civil War, becoming governor early in 1643. He conducted minor operations against numerous small bodies of Royalists, and conducted the defence of Gloucester against the King's main army, in August 1643, with great steadiness and ability, receiving the thanks of parliament and a grant of £1,000 for his services. In 1644, Massey continued to keep the field and to disperse the local Royalists, and on several occasions, he measured swords with Prince Rupert. In May 1644, he was made general of the forces of the Western Association. In 1645, he was defeated by Rupert at the Battle of Ledbury, he later took the offensive against Lord Goring and the western Royalists, advanced to the relief of Taunton, and in the autumn cooperated effectively with Sir Thomas Fairfax and the New Model Army in the Langport campaign.

After taking part in the desultory operations that closed the first war, he was elected Member of Parliament for Wootton Bassett.

== Royalist soldier ==
Massey then began to take an active part in politics on the Presbyterian side, and was one of the generals who was impeached by the army on the grounds that they were attempting to revive the Civil War in the Presbyterian interests. He fled England in June 1647 and, though he resumed his seat in the house in 1648, he was again excluded by Pride's Purge, and after a short imprisonment escaped to Holland. Thence, taking the side of Royalists openly and definitely. Like many other Presbyterians, he accompanied Charles II to Scotland.

He fought against Cromwell's army at the bridge of Stirling and Inverkeithing, and commanded the advanced guard of the Royalist army in the invasion of England in 1651. It was hoped that Massey's influence would win over the towns of the Severn valley to the cause of the King, and the march of the army on Worcester was partly inspired by this expectation. At the Battle of Worcester, he was seriously wounded, and when Massey realised that his wounds were dangerously slowing King Charles II down during his escape, he persuaded Charles to continue without him, although the king was reluctant to leave him.

Massey was arrested and imprisoned in the Tower of London. He again managed to escape to Holland. While negotiating with the English Presbyterians for the restoration of Charles, he visited England twice, in 1654 and 1656. He was arrested in England for his part in Booth's Uprising in 1659, but was able to escape for the third time. After his escape, while hiding in London, he encouraged the discontent that led to the soldiers' mutiny over pay on 1 February 1660.

== Restoration ==
In 1660, Massey was elected MP for Gloucester in the Convention Parliament, and was active in preparing for Charles's return. He was awarded a knighthood on 27 May 1660 and a grant of £3,000. In 1661, he was re-elected MP for Gloucester in the Cavalier Parliament. The rest of his life was spent in politics, and occasionally in military and administrative business.

He was unmarried, and died in 1674 at Abbeyleix in Ireland, where he had been granted the manor. He was a close friend of the leading judge Sir Jerome Alexander, another Englishman who had settled in Ireland; Alexander at his death in 1670 left Massey a number of valuables, such as "my cane with the silver head of a rhinoceros".

== Notes ==
Parliament of England
Preceded by William Pleydell; Edward Poole	Member of Parliament for Wootton Bassett; 1646–1648; With: Edward Poole	Succeeded by Not represented in Rump Parliament
Preceded by Thomas Pury, senior John Lenthall	Member of Parliament for Gloucester; 1660–1674; With: James Stephens 1660; Evan Seys 1661–1674	Succeeded by Evan Seys
