= Thomas Pury =

English politician (c.1590–1666)

Thomas Pury (c. 1590 – 13 August 1666) was an English politician who sat in the House of Commons variously between 1640 and 1659. He fought on the Parliamentarian side in the English Civil War.

Pury was the son of Walter Pury of Gloucester. He was originally a weaver and then a country solicitor. In 1626, he was sheriff of Gloucester.

In November 1640, Pury was elected Member of Parliament for Gloucester in the Long Parliament. He held the seat through the Rump Parliament to 1653. In 1642 Pury was appointed commissioner for Gloucester for "publishing scandalous ministers etc." He became a captain in the parliamentary army and commanded a company in the regiment of Colonel Henry Stephens. He helped the Earl of Stamford and Lt-Col Edward Massey in the defence of Gloucester in August 1643. In October 1643 he was chairman of the committee for Gloucester.

Pury was Mayor of Gloucester in 1653 and then re-elected MP for Gloucester in 1654 for the First Protectorate Parliament and in 1656 for the Second Protectorate Parliament. In 1659 he attended the restored Rump parliament and was charged with raising troops in Gloucester in July 1659.

Pury died at the age of 76 and was buried in St Mary's, Gloucester. He left a charity to the city.

Pury married Mary Ayle, daughter of Edward Ayle of Tewkesbury. His son Thomas was also an MP.

Parliament of England
Preceded by William Singleton; Henry Brett	Member of Parliament for Gloucester; 1640; With: Henry Brett 1640–1644; John Lenthall 1645–1653	Succeeded by Not represented in the Barebones Parliament
Preceded by Not represented in the Barebones Parliament	Member of Parliament for Gloucester; 1654– 1656; With: William Lenthall 1654; Major General Desborough 1656	Succeeded by Laurence Singleton; James Stephens
Preceded by Laurence Singleton; James Stephens	Member of Parliament for Gloucester; 1659; With: John Lenthall	Succeeded by Sir Edward Massey; James Stephens
