= Herefordshire and Gloucestershire Canal Trust =

Coordinates: 51°52′33″N 2°16′06″W

The Herefordshire and Gloucestershire Canal Trust is a British organisation whose main aim is the restoration of the Herefordshire and Gloucestershire Canal. It was formed as a canal society in 1983, and became a Trust in 1992.

== History ==
The Herefordshire and Gloucestershire Canal closed in 1883, having been progressively shut down during 1881 and 1882 to allow the Ledbury to Gloucester Railway to be constructed over its bed. Almost 100 years later, Atilla Katona suggested that part of the canal near Newent Lake, around 400 yards (370 m) in total, could be restored, and the news resulted in two articles appearing in specialist waterways magazines. Work began on the project, after a feasibility study was presented to Newent Town Council, but the Inland Waterways Protection Society highlighted a number of potential problems, and the scheme was subsequently abandoned. A long letter was published in the Hereford Times newspaper in 1980, and a steering committee was formed in autumn 1982. Following the publication of a series of articles in local newspapers, which outlined the history of the canal, a public meeting was held on 13 April 1983, at which the Herefordshire and Gloucestershire Canal Society was formally constituted. Its chief aim was to raise public awareness of the history and heritage of the canal. However, opportunities to restore parts of the canal soon presented themselves, and the society became a restoration group with an active membership.

One of the first restoration projects was on a length of canal at Monkhide, including Ballard's skew bridge and two other bridges. This section was owned by Major Robert Barnes, a descendant of Stephen Ballard, who had overseen the construction of the canal from Ledbury to Hereford in the 1840s. The society managed to get the skew bridge protected as a grade II listed structure in January 1986, and the section was opened in 1987. However, they failed to negotiate public access to it, and decided that they would only carry out further restoration work on sections which they either owned outright, or for which a public access licence had been successfully negotiated. The existing structure of the society proved to be inadequate, and in 1992 it reformed as the Herefordshire and Gloucestershire Canal Trust, with the aim of restoring the entire 34 miles (55 km) of the canal from the River Severn at Gloucester to Hereford. The Trust is registered with Companies House, the United Kingdom Registrar of Companies, and is a private company limited by guarantee with no share capital. Its registration number is 02704407.

The Trust has used a number of imaginative tactics to achieve their aims. At Over, when the canal joins the River Severn, they reached an agreement with the developers of the former isolation hospital. This required them to complete the construction of a basin within a short timescale, successful completion of which would result in the developer donating the land on which it was built to them, and also providing the basic shell of a three-storey building. This has become Wharf House, and includes a restaurant which has gained an Automobile Association red rosette, and a bed and breakfast facility which has been awarded four stars. A section of canal has been restored along the edge of Aylestone Park, near Hereford. Land for the park was obtained by Herefordshire Council, and in an unusual example of cooperation, the park was built by the Canal Trust, assisted by the Waterway Recovery Group, while the Council carried out the restoration of the canal.

== Bibliography ==
- Bick, David (2003). The Hereford and Gloucester Canal. Oakwood Press. ISBN 0-85361-599-3.
- Potter, Hugh (September 2011). "Entrepreneurs with shovels". Waterways World. ISSN 0309-1422.
- Squires, Roger (2008). Britain's restored canals. Landmark Publishing. ISBN 978-1-84306-331-5.
