= Over, Tewkesbury =

Village in Gloucestershire, England

Coordinates: 51.874°N 2.271°W

Over
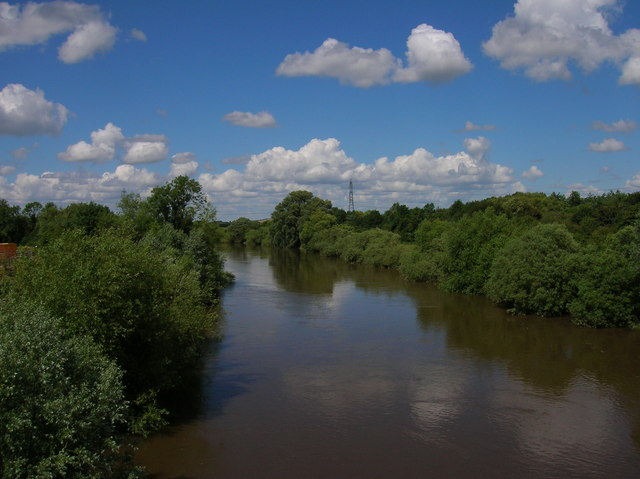
- The River Severn at Over

- Location within Gloucestershire
- OS grid reference: SO813196
- Civil parish: Highnam
- District: Tewkesbury
- Shire county: Gloucestershire
- Region: South West
- Country: England
- Sovereign state: United Kingdom
- Post town: GLOUCESTER
- Postcode district: GL2
- Dialling code: 01452
- Police: Gloucestershire
- Fire: Gloucestershire
- Ambulance: South Western
- UK Parliament: Tewkesbury

Over is a village in Gloucestershire, England, 2 mi (3.2 km) west of Gloucester. It lies on the A40 road in the parish of Highnam, on the west bank of the River Severn. Over was historically a hamlet of the parish of Churcham. In 1935, it was transferred to the newly formed parish of Highnam.

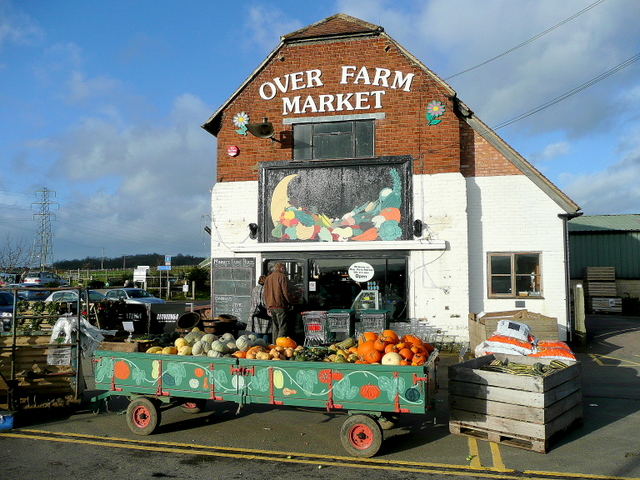
The Farmers' Market, Over's most visible presence to drivers on the A40

The village is linked to Alney Island and Gloucester by Over Bridge, now a pedestrian bridge but until 1966 the lowest road crossing of the Severn. There was a bridge at Over, where a Roman road crossed the river, from ancient times. It was rebuilt several times, and the present bridge was built by Thomas Telford between 1826 and 1829.

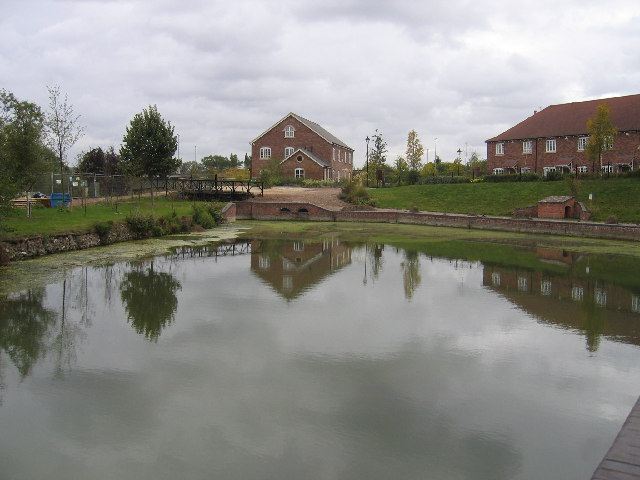
The basin of the Herefordshire and Gloucestershire Canal

The River Leadon joins the River Severn just to the north of the village. The Herefordshire and Gloucestershire Canal, opened in 1795 and closed in 1881, joined the Severn between the village and the confluence of the Leadon. The canal basin at Over was restored in 2000.

In 1903 a new infectious diseases hospital was opened at Over. It closed in 1991.
