= Henry Brett (MP for Gloucester) =

English politician (c. 1587 – 1674)

Henry Brett (c. 1587 – 31 March 1674) was an English politician who sat in the House of Commons from 1640 to 1644. He supported the Royalist side in the English Civil War.

Brett was the son of James Brett of Leicester. He became an official under the Lord Chancellor.

In April 1640, Brett was elected Member of Parliament for Gloucester in the Short Parliament. In November 1640 he was re-elected MP for Gloucester in the Long Parliament and held the seat until he was disabled in February 1644. Brett joined the Royalist side and sat in the King's assembly in Oxford. He signed the loyal letter to Lord Essex for peace at Oxford on 27 January 1645. On 7 August 1646 he begged to "compound on the Oxford Articles for delinquency" and paid a fine of around £874.

Brett was appointed alderman of Gloucester on 16 May 1672. He died at the age of 87.

Brett married Margaret Rudd, widow of Anthony Rudd and daughter of Alderman Thomas Seames of Gloucester. His brother Arthur Brett was a gentleman of the Privy Chamber to King James I. His grandson Henry Brett of Sandywell Park was MP for Bishops Castle.

Parliament of England
Vacant Parliament suspended since 1629	Member of Parliament for Gloucester; 1640–1644; With: William Singleton 1640	Succeeded by Thomas Pury; John Lenthall
