= Nicholas Overbury =

English lawyer, landowner and politician

Sir Nicholas Overbury (1551 – May 1643) was an English lawyer, landowner and politician who sat in the House of Commons from 1604 to 1611.

Overbury was the son of Thomas Overbury. He was called to the bar at the Middle Temple and was chosen Autumn Reader in 1600. He was Recorder of Gloucester from 15 April 1603 until he resigned in 1626. In 1604, he was elected Member of Parliament for Gloucester. He was appointed Steward of Chipping Campden by its charter of 13 June 1605. He was elected a Bencher of his Inn and became Treasurer on 27 April 1610. On 8 December 1610 he became Chief Justice of the Great Sessions for Carmarthenshire, Cardiganshire, and Pembrokeshire, remaining until 1637. He was one of the Council of the Marches of Wales on 9 February 1621 and was Knighted on 22 August 1621. He was lord of the manor of Bourton, which he obtained from Lord Wentworth, and was of Ashton sub Edge.

Overbury died at the age of about 91 and was buried on 31 May 1643.

Overbury married Mary Palmer, daughter of Giles Palmer of Ilmington and Compton Sarpion, Warwickshire. His eldest son was Sir Thomas Overbury, who was poisoned in the Tower of London in 1613. A daughter, Margaret Overbury, married Edmund Lechmere of Hanley Castle (d. 1650) in 1610.

Parliament of England
Preceded by William Oldsworth; Luke Garnons	Member of Parliament for Gloucester; 1604–1611; With: John Jones	Succeeded by Thomas Machen; John Browne
