= Thomas Semys =

16th-century English politician

Thomas Semys (died 1603) was an English politician from Gloucester.

He was appointed sheriff of Gloucester for 1558–9 and 1563–4, created an alderman and made mayor for 1565, 1578 and 1599.

He was a member (MP) of the parliament of England for Gloucester in 1572.

He left his property to his only daughter, Margaret.
