= Anthony Robinson (MP) =

English politician (c. 1582–1641)

Anthony Robinson (c. 1582–1641) was an English politician who sat in the House of Commons in 1621 and 1624.

== Life and career ==
Robinson was the son of Robert Robinson of Gloucester. He matriculated at St Alban Hall, Oxford on 14 October 1597, aged 15, and in 1601 entered the Middle Temple to study law. In 1605 he married Hester, daughter of John Browne, mercer of Gloucester, and had 6 sons and 3 daughters. Abandoning the law, he became a merchant and attained the status of gentleman.

He was sheriff of Gloucester in 1616. In 1621, he was elected Member of Parliament for Gloucester alongside his brother-in-law John Browne and both were re-elected in 1624. In 1626 he was made an alderman for life and in 1629 he was made Mayor of Gloucester for a year. In 1634 Robinson delivered the city’s petition in favour of its puritan lecturer, John Workman to Archbishop Laud.

Robinson died in 1641 and was buried in St Nicholas Church, Gloucester.

Parliament of England
Preceded by Thomas Machen; John Browne	Member of Parliament for Gloucester; 1621–1624; With: John Browne	Succeeded by Christopher Caple; John Browne
