= John Hanbury (MP) =

English politician (1574–1658)

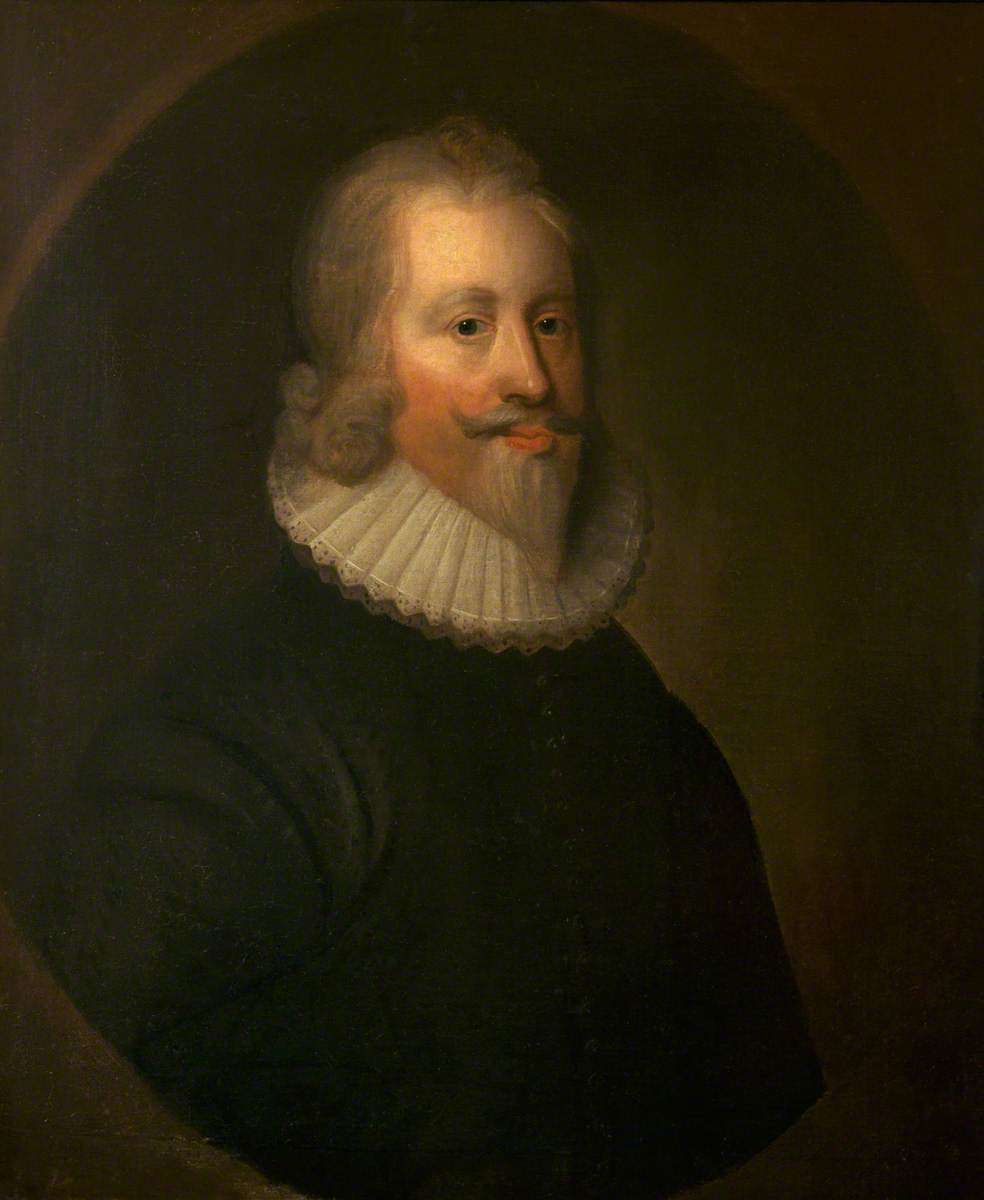

John Hanbury (1574–1658) was an English politician who sat in the House of Commons from 1628 to 1629. He supported the Royalist cause in the English Civil War.

Hanbury was the eldest son of Richard Hanbury of Elmley Lovett, and was of Feckenham, Worcestershire and Preston, Gloucestershire. In 1628, he was elected Member of Parliament for Gloucester and sat until 1629 when King Charles decided to rule without parliament for eleven years. He supported the King in the Civil War. He compounded for delinquency on 1 May 1649 and was fined £100 on 29 May.

Hanbury died at the age of 84 and was buried at St Nicholas Gloucester on 16 July 1658 as "Mr Hanbury citizen of London and Gloucester – a man prudent eminent and munificent".

Hanbury married firstly Anne, daughter of Christopher Caple. He married secondly Anne Clements widow of Toby Clements of Gloucester and daughter of alderman Thomas Rich of Gloucester.

Parliament of England
Preceded by John Browne; Christopher Caple	Member of Parliament for Gloucester; 1628–1629; With: John Browne	Parliament suspended until 1640
