= Herefordshire and Gloucestershire Canal =

Canal in England

Coordinates: 52.0468°N 2.4305°W

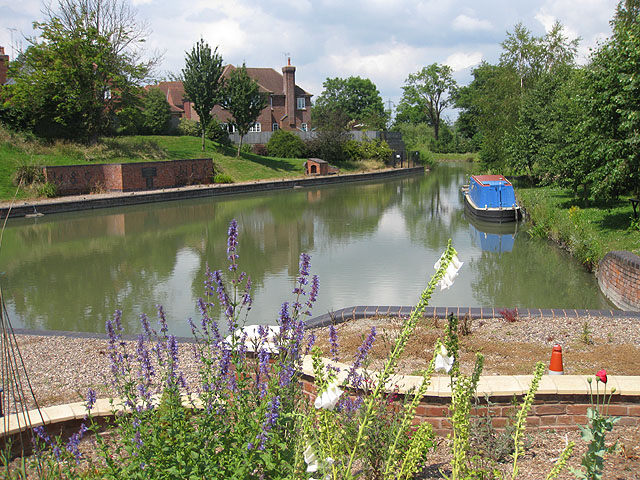
- The restored basin at Over
- Interactive map of Herefordshire and Gloucestershire Canal

Specifications
- Maximum boat length: 70 ft 0 in (21.34 m)
- Maximum boat beam: 8 ft 0 in (2.44 m)
- Locks: 23
- Status: Several sections under restoration
- Navigation authority: none

History
- Original owner: Herefordshire and Gloucestershire Navigation Co
- Principal engineer: Josiah Clowes
- Other engineers: Robert Whitworth, Stephen Ballard
- Date of act: 1791
- Date of first use: 1798
- Date completed: 1845
- Date closed: 1881

Geography
- Start point: Over, nr Gloucester
- End point: Barrs Court Basin, Hereford
- Branch: Oxenhall Coal Branch
- Connects to: River Severn

The Herefordshire and Gloucestershire Canal (sometimes known as the Hereford and Gloucester Canal) is a canal in the west of England, which ran from Hereford to Gloucester, where it linked to the River Severn. It was opened in two phases in 1798 and 1845, and closed in 1881, when the southern section was used for the course of the Ledbury and Gloucester Railway. It is the subject of an active restoration scheme.

== History ==
The first plans for a canal between Hereford and Gloucester were made by Robert Whitworth, one of James Brindley's pupils, in 1777. The route was part of a grander plan to Stourport-on-Severn and Leominster as well. Twelve years later, Richard Hall submitted plans for a canal via Ledbury.

Herefordshire and Gloucestershire Canal Act 1791
- Act of Parliament
- Parliament of Great Britain
- Long title: An Act for making and maintaining a Navigable Cut or Canal from the City of Hereford to the City of Gloucester, with a Collateral Cut from the same to the Town of Newent in the County of Gloucester.
- Citation: 31 Geo. 3. c. 89
- Territorial extent: Great Britain

Dates
- Royal assent: 11 April 1791
- Commencement: 10 August 1790 (Note: Start of session.)
Other legislation
Amended by	Herefordshire and Gloucestershire Canal Act 1793; Herefordshire and Gloucestershire Canal Act 1839

Status: Amended

Text of statute as originally enacted

In March 1790, the promoters decided to submit the plans to Parliament. Josiah Clowes, an engineer who had previous experience of working on the Chester Canal and who had worked with Whitworth on the Thames and Severn Canal, was to be the engineer. It appears that he re-surveyed the route, and recommended a change, so that it passed through Ledbury. A branch would be built to Newent where there were minor coalfields, and the canal would be suitable for boats 70 by 8 feet (21.3 by 2.4 m), capable of carrying 35 tons. The estimated cost was £70,000, and it was expected to carry 33,203 tons per year, generating £9,582 in revenue. Some of the promoters began to think that improving the River Wye might be a better option, but the announcement of new seams of coal at Newent resulted in a decision to obtain an act of Parliament, the Herefordshire and Gloucestershire Canal Act 1791 (31 Geo. 3. c. 89), which was granted in April 1791.

Herefordshire and Gloucestershire Canal Act 1793
- Act of Parliament
- Parliament of Great Britain
- Long title: An Act to vary and extend the Line of the Canal authorized to be made by an Act passed in the Thirty-first Year of the Reign of His present Majesty, intituled, "An Act for making and maintaining a Navigable Canal from the City of Hereford to the City of Gloucester, with a Collateral Cut from the same to the Town of Newent, in the County of Gloucester;" and to amend the said Act.
- Citation: 33 Geo. 3. c. 119
- Territorial extent: Great Britain

Dates
- Royal assent: 11 June 1793
- Commencement: 11 June 1793 (Note: The Acts of Parliament (Commencement) Act 1793.)
Other legislation
Amends	Herefordshire and Gloucestershire Canal Act 1791

Status: Amended

Text of statute as originally enacted

Hugh Henshall, who was the brother-in-law of James Brindley, was asked to re-survey the route in 1792, and recommended a diversion to Newent. This route required a tunnel at Oxenhall, and another act of Parliament was obtained, the Herefordshire and Gloucestershire Canal Act 1793 (33 Geo. 3. c. 119), to sanction the new route. Josiah Clowes died in 1795, and was succeeded as engineer by Robert Whitworth. By late 1795, the initial section was open to Newent, but the tunnel was causing major problems.

In order to build the tunnel, twenty shafts were sunk along its route, so that there could be multiple working faces. However, there were considerable difficulties caused by the volume of water entering the shafts. Horse-powered pumps proved inadequate, and eventually steam-powered pumps were employed, but this added to the cost, and the tunnel was a large factor in the failure to complete the canal.

The canal was opened to within one mile of Ledbury in 1798, but stopped there as the cost had far exceeded the estimates. The Coal Branch to the mines at Newent was never a success, as the coal was of very poor quality, and the branch fell into disuse very quickly. The price of coal in the region dropped from 24 shillings (£1.20) per ton to 13/6 (68p) but the coal was a good quality product which travelled up the canal from the River Severn. Ledbury remained the terminus for another forty years, although a short extension to enable coal to be delivered to the Ledbury gas works was completed in 1832.

=== Second phase ===
Herefordshire and Gloucestershire Canal Act 1839
- Act of Parliament
- Parliament of the United Kingdom
- Long title: An Act for enabling the Company of Proprietors of the Herefordshire and Gloucestershire Canal Navigation to raise a further Sum of Money, and for amending the Acts relating thereto.
- Citation: 2 & 3 Vict. c. xxvi
- Territorial extent: United Kingdom

Dates
- Royal assent: 4 June 1839
- Commencement: 4 June 1839
Other legislation
Amends	Herefordshire and Gloucestershire Canal Act 1791; Herefordshire and Gloucestershire Canal Act 1793

Status: Current legislation

Text of statute as originally enacted

In 1827, Stephen Ballard became the new clerk of the company, and produced a report on how to complete the canal in 1829. In 1838, he proposed a new route for the final section, but the engineer James Walker advised against it, and so in May 1839, a new act of Parliament, the Herefordshire and Gloucestershire Canal Act 1839 (2 & 3 Vict. c. xxvi), was obtained, allowing the company to raise the money to complete the canal. Work started on 17 November. A feeder from the River Frome to the summit level was completed in August 1842, and the canal opened in stages as it was completed, with extensions to Canon Frome wharf in January 1843, Whithington wharf in February 1844, and finally to Hereford basin on 22 May 1845.

As with the first phase, it was the tunnel construction which caused the most problems, and Ashperton tunnel, although only 400 yards (370 m) long, was affected by water flooding the work faces and by unstable rock, resulting in the need to construct a brick and stone lining. Again, costs escalated well beyond the original estimates.

=== Operation ===
The canal had cost far more to build than was originally planned. The whole canal had been estimated at £69,997 by Josiah Clowes in 1790, but the section to Ledbury had cost in excess of £104,000. Stephen Ballard had estimated the cost of the second phase at £53,000, but the final cost had been £141,436. With little increase in trade from the longer canal, the company tried to sell it to a railway company almost immediately, but were unsuccessful, and so tried to boost trade.

Traffic started to increase, to the extent that a timetable for the transit of the Oxenhall tunnel had to be introduced in 1849. This was not always successful, as the Hereford Times carried articles in May 1851 about an incident in which boats travelling in opposite directions had met in the middle, and neither would give way. There was deadlock for a period of 58 hours.

=== Decline and closure ===
Great Western Railway (Hereford and Gloucester Canal Vesting) Act 1870
- Act of Parliament
- Parliament of the United Kingdom
- Long title: An Act for vesting in the Great Western Railway Company the undertaking of the Company of Proprietors of the Herefordshire and Gloucestershire Canal Navigation; and for other purposes.
- Citation: 33 & 34 Vict. c. lxxxiii

Dates
- Royal assent: 4 July 1870

Text of statute as originally enacted

In 1858, the canal carried 47,560 tons of goods, and generated an income of £7,061 in 1860, but some of this was derived from the carriage of materials to build railways in the area. On 17 January 1862, less than 17 years after the opening to Hereford, the canal was leased to the Great Western Railway and the West Midland Railway, with a view to converting it to a railway. This did not take place immediately, but on 30 June 1881, half of the canal was closed, and sections of it were used for the course of the Ledbury and Gloucester Railway. The Hereford to Ledbury section remained open, but gradually became disused. The canal company continued to receive rent from the Great Western Railway, which it distributed to its shareholders as dividends, and was not formally wound up until the railways were nationalised in 1948.

== Route ==
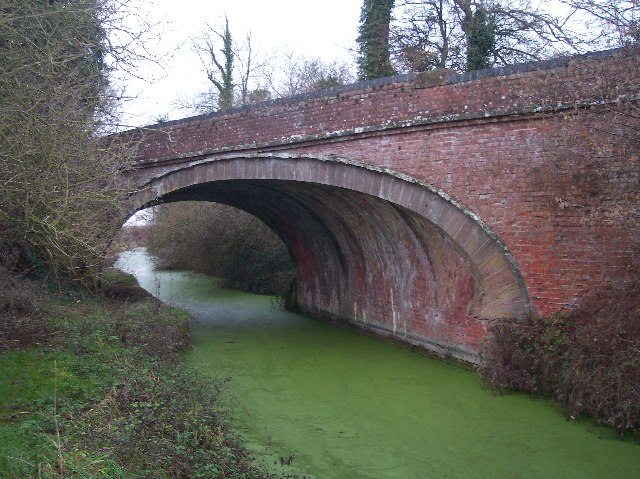
Monkhide skew bridge

The canal ran for 34 miles (55 km) from Hereford basin through Ledbury, Dymock and Newent to Over, on the West Channel of the River Severn west of Gloucester, with a short branch to the coal fields at Gorsley. The first 6 miles (9.7 km) from Hereford to Withington, which includes the Aylestone tunnel, was level, after which the canal rose by 37 feet (11 m) through three locks over the three miles to Monkhide. This section includes the skew bridge at Monkhide, built by Ballard at an angle of only 27° to the canal. The bridge was constructed of red brick with some stone dressing, and the parapets are capped with large black engineering bricks which indicate that they were made by B W Blades of West Bromwich. The bridge is a grade II listed structure. There is then another level section of more than twelve miles to the outskirts of Ledbury, which includes the Ashperton tunnel. Water is fed into this section from the River Frome. The final 18 miles (29 km) to Over falls by 195 feet (59 m), and includes the 2,192-yard (2,004 m) Oxenhall tunnel, which was not destroyed by the construction of the railway, as the railway company took the sensible decision to avoid the likely problems of enlarging it, and built a diversion to the south-west. The coal branch left the canal below the tunnel. The canal had 22 locks, and three tunnels. Like many English canals it was built to carry valuable cargoes by narrowboats.

== Restoration ==
In the early 1970s, Major Robert Barnes, who was a distant relation of Stephen Ballard, began clearing a section of the canal that he owned, which included the Skew Bridge at Monkhide. In 1979 the author David Bick suggested that a 400-yard (370 m) length of canal near Newent Lake could be restored, and although work began, it was abandoned when the Inland Waterways Protection Society advised against it. A series of articles about the canal were published in the local press in early 1983, and this led to calls for a society to be formed which would raise public awareness of the canal. A meeting was held in Hereford to facilitate this on 13 April 1983, at which a canal society was formed, which soon became actively engaged in restoration. With his encouragement, the first working party was held on 3 July 1983 on the section owned by Major Barnes. The importance of the Skew Bridge was recognised in 1986, when it became a grade II listed structure. By 1987, progress had been sufficient for an open day to be held, to allow the public to see what had been achieved. Progress was recognised by the Inland Waterways Association, who made a grant of £2,000 to the society.

While the original goal was preservation of the remains, there was a gradual shift among members of the society towards restoration of the canal. Both Hereford and Worcester County Council and Gloucestershire County Council were supportive of this aim. Bick wrote to Charles Hadfield, an authority on canals and one of the founders of the Inland Waterways Association, for advice and in January 1988 he replied. He suggested that Bick should leave the society immediately and have nothing more to do with restoration. He listed many obstacles, and thought that the canal along with others such as the Grantham Canal, the Thames and Severn Canal, the Wey and Arun Canal and the Portsmouth and Arundel Canal were projects too big to be considered. Time has shown him to be mis-guided. In 1992 the society became the Herefordshire and Gloucestershire Canal Trust (H&G Canal Trust) with the aim of full restoration of the 34 miles (55 km) of canal and locks so that Hereford would once again be linked with Ledbury, Dymock, Newent and the rest of the inland waterway system at Gloucester.

Since 1991 the local council authorities in Herefordshire have set aside land for development as a canal route. The planning department has approved projects with the canal in mind, and has taken action against those trying to build on the proposed route of the canal. Protection of the route of the canal is mandated by the Herefordshire Local Plan, and core strategy E4 not only safeguards the route, but also requires that when adjoining developments are being planned, they must include restoration of the canal. Plans for Hereford city centre include a new basin near the site of the original basin, with the towpath forming an attractive green corridor between there and Aylestone Park. Similar support has been given by the local council authorities in Gloucestershire, most notably the Forest of Dean District Council, through which most of the canal in Gloucestershire runs.

In 2000, the Over Canal Basin (adjacent to the River Severn at Over on the outskirts of Gloucester, where the Canal links with the inland waterways network) was reconstructed entirely by volunteers from the Canal Trust and the national volunteer body the Waterway Recovery Group. The estimated commercial cost of the work was some £500,000, but it was completed against a 10-month deadline, with a budget of just £60,000. The basin was originally filled in when the Over Isolation Hospital was built in 1903. The site was sold for housing development to Swan Homes, and agreement was reached to excavate the basin to enhance the project, under which Wharf House was rebuilt to provide a new canal centre. In late 2011, the Trust was able to buy a short section of the former canal route adjacent to the basin site (Vineyard Hill). This had been purchased by residents in 2004 to protect their communal interests, and was passed to the Trust for a nominal sum. Like the basin, there was a deadline on development, which had to be completed by September 2012, but a major effort by the Waterway Recovery Group and members of the Trust resulted in most of the work being completed in April 2012. It was re-watered by 18 April, four months before its scheduled completion date. It was formally re-opened by Timothy West and Prunella Scales at the 2012 Over Canal Festival.

Major re-development in Hereford city centre has resulted in the provision for a new canal bed which it is hoped will eventually link to a new terminal basin. Further development has also taken place on the Aylestone Park section, after the removal of silt containing heavy metals. Following partial restoration, which saw the Trust working on the park, and Herefordshire Council, owners of the park, working on the canal, a short section at Aylestone was used for a boat rally in May 2011. A slipway enabled the boats to be launched, and the canal will be made wider in due course.

The canal connects to an un-navigable part of the River Severn, separated from the main channel by weirs at Maisemore and Llanthony, both of which have derelict locks associated with them. Maisemore was sold by British Waterways in the 1980s, and they decided to dispose of Llanthony in 2007. The Canal Trust used a legacy to purchase the site, which includes two cottages, some land, and a small section of the River Severn as well as Llanthony lock. The lock is bigger than that at Maisemore, and access to the entrance lock at Over is easier because boats would be travelling against the flow of the river as they approach it. Over Lock is around 30 feet (9.1 m) deep, as it has to cope with the large tidal range of the River Severn, and so restoration would be difficult. In early 2022 the Trust asked a consulting engineer from the Inland Waterways Association's Restoration Hub to assess how the canal could be connected to the river. Three options were suggested, two of which involved restoring Over Lock, but the third was to cross the west channel of the Severn on an aqueduct, and construct a new cut across Alney Island to join the non-tidal river above the entrance to Gloucester Docks and the Gloucester and Sharpness Canal.

At Newent, Bridge Street crossed over the canal on a bridge. When the railway replaced the canal, they constructed a high level bridge over the road, which was lowered to accommodate this solution. The Canal Trust envisaged that the canal could be rebuilt between the platforms of Newent railway station, but this would have involved the construction of large embankments, which were thought to be out of scale with the environment. In 2019, they therefore reconsidered what options were possible, and proposed the use of an inclined plane, using a cradle running on rails to raise boats from the canal level up to the station, with a level section between the platforms, followed by another incline to reach the height required to cross the road and another incline to return boats to the level of the canal on the other side.

In November 2021, planning permission was granted to allow the Trust to construct 660 yards (600 m) of new canal at Malswick, on the section that was converted into a railway. An embankment had been built over the original route of the canal, and its removal would have been extremely difficult. The new route therefore runs alongside the embankment, and major construction work took place in 2022. Because the channel cuts through natural clay, it is not expected to need lining when the work is completed. The project included the planting of around 1,000 hedge plants and trees near to the canal.

In May, the trust announced that they would be excavating Over Lock during 2026, as the first step towards connecting the canal to the national network. The initial objective is to find the floor of the lock, so that restoration can be planned. The lock has been claimed to be both 30 feet (9.1 m) and 13 feet (4.0 m) deep by various sources, with the confusion arising from the large tidal range of the Severn at this point.

== Visitor Centre ==
The Wharf House at Over Basin is a restored lock cottage that, until 2019, served as a visitor centre and restaurant. From its inception in 2005 until 2019, the Wharf House was operated by the Herefordshire & Gloucestershire Canal Trust, with profits donated to the H&G Canal Trust Charity. In 2019, management of the Wharf House was transferred to a private firm, and the restaurant was renamed The Lock Keepers.

== See also ==
- Canals of the United Kingdom
- History of the British canal system

== Bibliography ==
- Bick, David (2003). The Hereford and Gloucester Canal. Oakwood Press. ISBN 978-0-85361-599-6.
- Hadfield, Charles (1967). The Canals of South Wales and the Border. David and Charles. ISBN 978-0-7153-4027-1.
- Ludgate, Martin (23 May 2022). "Restoring the Herefordshire & Gloucestershire Canal". Canal Boat. Archived from the original on 25 June 2022.
- Potter, Hugh (September 2011). "Entrepreneurs with shovels". Waterways World. ISSN 0309-1422.
- Priestley, Joseph (1831). "The Navigable Rivers and Canals of Great Britain". Archived from the original on 3 March 2016.
- Skeet, Richard (2014). Rescued From Obscurity. Hereford and Gloucester Canal Trust. ISBN 978-0-9929441-0-0.
- Skeet, Richard (2023). Rescued From Obscurity 2. Hereford and Gloucester Canal Trust. ISBN 978-0-9929441-1-7.
- Squires, Roger (2008). Britain's restored canals. Landmark Publishing. ISBN 978-1-84306-331-5.
