= John Browne (MP for Gloucester) =

English brewer and politician

John Browne (c1569-1639) was an English brewer and politician who sat in the House of Commons between 1614 and 1629.

== Life ==
Browne was the eldest son of John Browne (d. 1593), an alderman and Mercer of Gloucester and his wife Hester. After his father's death his mother married Godfrey Goldsborough, the bishop of Gloucester. He became a brewer in the city and he was sheriff of Gloucester in 1603 and Mayor for 1610–11. In 1614, he was elected Member of Parliament for Gloucester. He was mayor of Gloucester again for 1621–22 and was re-elected MP for Gloucester in the same year. He was re-elected MP for Gloucester in 1624, 1625, 1626 and 1628. In 1629 he criticized the king's attempt to collect tonnage and poundage without parliamentary consent. He was mayor again for 1634–35.

He settled in Churcham and was described as lord of the manor when he died. He also leased the rectory of Churcham from the Dean and Chapter of Gloucester in 1634. He died in August 1639 and was buried at Churcham.

== Family ==
He married twice. His first wife was Eleanor(c1580-1603), the daughter of Robert Robinson of Gloucester. His brother-in-law Anthony Robinson served alongside him in parliament in 1621 and 1624. His second wife was Sarah (d. 1643), the daughter of John Mayo of Charfield and widow of Lawrence Wilshire of Gloucester. He had no children and his estate passed to his second wife, apart from property inherited from his father that passed to two surviving brothers.

Parliament of England
Preceded by Nicholas Overbury; John Jones	Member of Parliament for Gloucester; 1614–1629; With: Thomas Machen 1614; Anthony Robinson 1621–1624; Christopher Caple 1625–1626; John Hanbury 1628–1629	Parliament suspended until 1640
