= St Nicholas Church, Gloucester =

Coordinates: 51.8674°N 2.2499°W

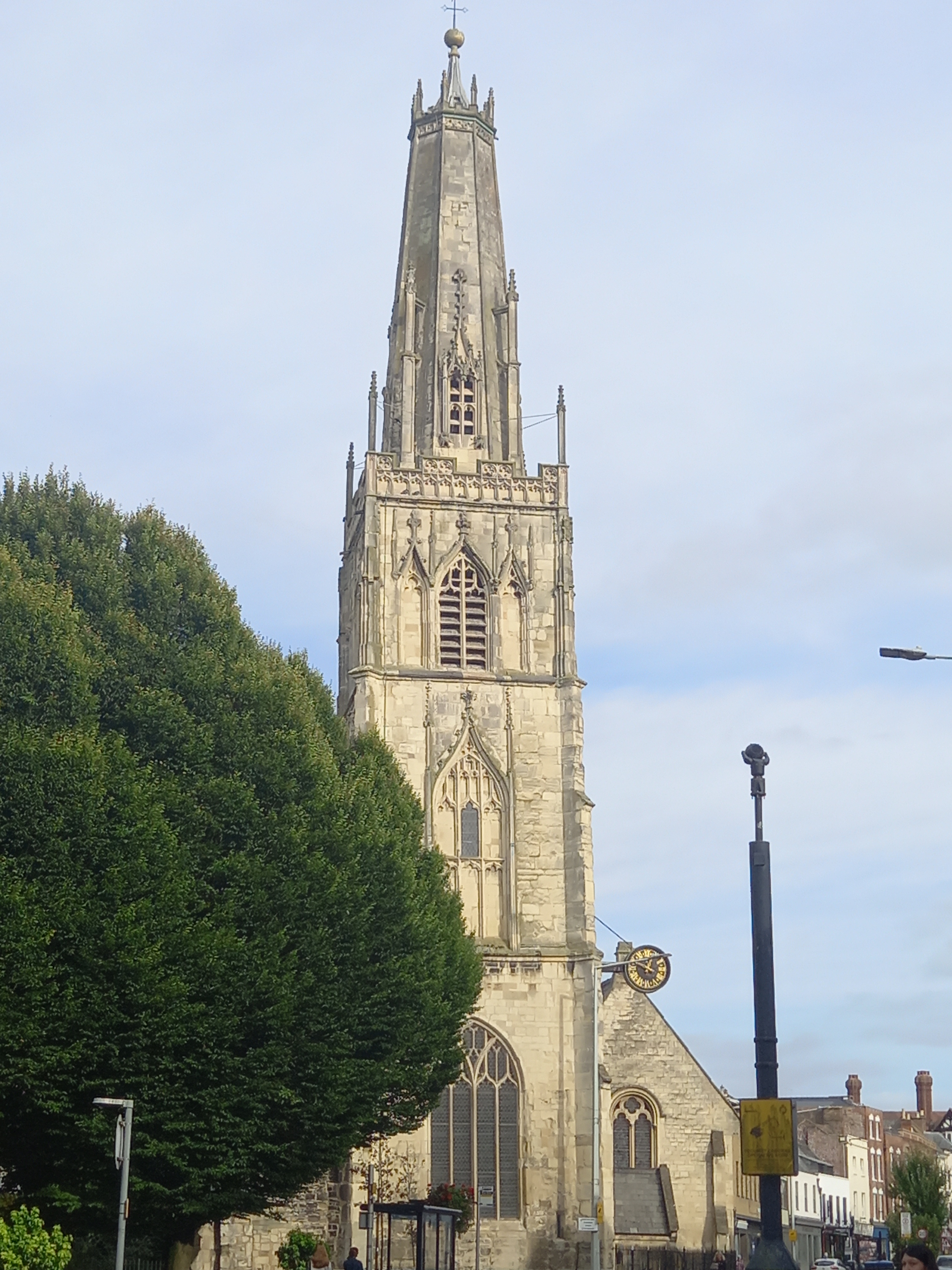
- St Nicholas Church on Westgate Street

- Location in Gloucestershire
- OS grid reference: SO 829 189
- Location: Westgate Street, Gloucester
- Country: England
- Denomination: Anglican
- Website: St Nicholas', Gloucester

History
- Dedication: Saint Nicholas

Architecture
- Functional status: Redundant
- Heritage designation: Grade I
- Designated: 23 January 1952
- Architectural type: Church
- Style: Norman, Gothic

Specifications
- Materials: Limestone, slate roofs

St Nicholas Church is a historic church in Westgate Street in the city of Gloucester, England, under the care of The Churches Conservation Trust. It is recorded in the National Heritage List for England as a designated Grade I listed building. Its truncated spire is a landmark in the city centre.

== History ==
The church was built in or around 1190. By 1203 it was known as "St. Nicholas of the Bridge at Gloucester". It was largely rebuilt in the 13th century, retaining some of its earlier features. Further alterations were made in the 15th century, and the west tower and spire were added. The spire was originally 200 feet (61 m) high. During the 16th century, the parish was the wealthiest in the city. The northeast vestry was extended in the 16th and 17th centuries. In 1643 during the Siege of Gloucester in the Civil War the spire suffered a direct hit by cannon fire. It was reduced in height and capped in 1783 by John Bryan. In 1865 the church was restored by John Jaques and Son, and it was repaired following a fire in 1901. The tower was stabilized in 1927, and between 1935 and 1938 the north aisle was rebuilt and the church was re-roofed. After the church was closed in 1967, it was vested in the Redundant Churches Fund (the forerunners of the Churches Conservation Trust) in 1975, and repairs have since been carried out. The church was declared redundant on 7 May 1971, and was vested in the Churches Conservation Trust on 25 June 1975.

== Architecture ==
=== Exterior ===
St Nicholas is constructed in limestone with slate roofs. Its plan consists of a six-bay nave and a two-bay chancel. On the south side of the nave at its west end is a two-storey porch. To the east of this, extending from the third bay of the nave to the first bay of the chancel, is the south aisle, and to the east of this is a small porch leading to a priest's door. At the west end of the church is a tower with a truncated spire. On the north side, against the side of the tower is another porch. From the first to the fifth bay of the nave is the north aisle, and at its east end is a wider chapel, forming a transept. On the north side of the chancel is a vestry.

The tower has diagonal corner buttresses, and is divided into three stages by string courses. There is a three-light window in each of the outer faces in the bottom stage, and also in all the faces of the middle stage. In the top stage are two-light bell openings on each side, flanked by niches. Above all these windows and bell openings are crocketed ogee gablets flanked by pinnacles; they all contain Perpendicular tracery. At the top of the tower is a battlemented parapet with pierced tracery panels, and pinnacles at the corners. Inset on the tower is an octagonal spire with a pinnacle attached to each of its diagonal faces. On each cardinal face is a two-light lucarne. The upper part of the spire has been removed and around its top is a pinnacled coronet. On the summit of the truncated spire is a lead ogee cap with ball finial. On the south side of the tower, between the bottom and middle stages is a clock carried on a bracket.

The two-storey south porch is gabled and has an arched entrance containing iron gates. Inside the porch is a 12th-century arched doorway over which is a tympanum containing a carving depicting the Agnus Dei and foliage. The bays of the aisles are separated by buttresses, and each bay contains a three-light window. At the east end of the church is a five-light window with Perpendicular tracery.

=== Interior ===
Inside the tower is a lierne vault. The nave has an open timber roof. The details of the columns and arches of the arcades vary, some being Norman in style, and others Gothic. On the north and south walls of the chancel are squints, and on the south wall are a piscina and a credence table. The chancel is floored with encaustic tiles. At the east end of the south aisle is the former timber front of the west gallery, which had been installed there in 1621 and moved to this position in 1924. Over the south doorway are the Royal arms of Charles II. The remainder of the fittings date from the 19th century. The memorials include a chest tomb with coloured effigies of Alderman John Walton, who died in 1636, and his wife. The two-manual organ was built in 1831 by Gray and Davison, but was moved to St Mary de Lode Church, Gloucester in 1972. There is a ring of six bells, the oldest two of which were cast in about 1499. The other bells are one cast in 1608 by John Baker, two in 1636 by Roger I Purdue, and one in 1725 by Abraham II Rudhall.

== See also ==
- List of churches preserved by the Churches Conservation Trust in the English Midlands
