= Alney Island =

Island in the River Severn, England

Coordinates: 51°52′39″N 2°15′51″W

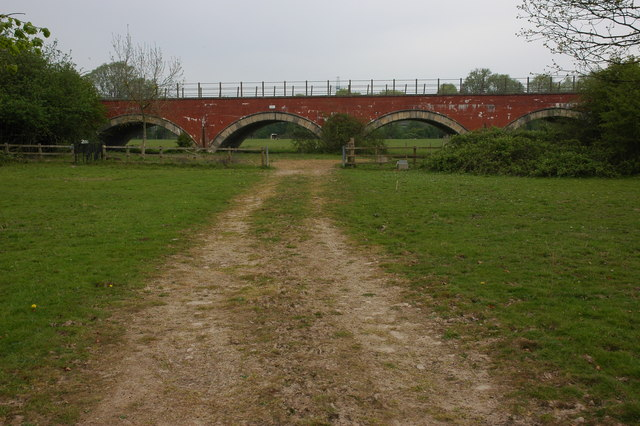
The Alney Island railway viaduct on the South Wales Railway.

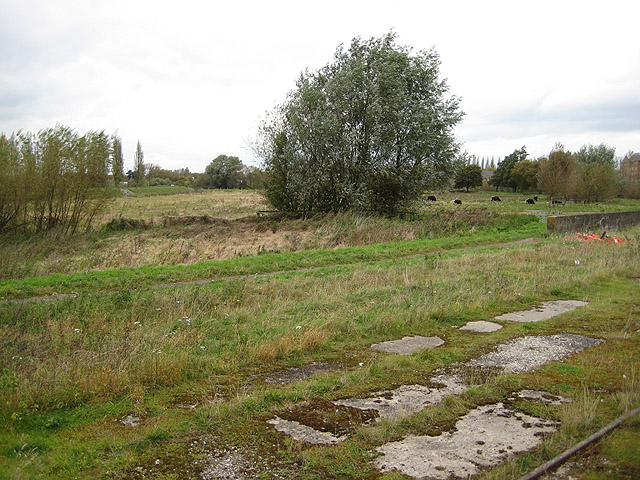
Alney Island Nature Reserve (October, 2008)

Alney Island is an island in the River Severn near Gloucester, Gloucestershire, England. The Severn splits into two channels (known as East Channel and West Channel) at Upper Parting (the northernmost tip of Alney), and merges again at Lower Parting to the south. The island is a strip of land in between the two channels, about 2.1 miles (3.4 km) long and 0.74 miles (1.19 km) at its widest. It is a local Nature Reserve.

Alney consists mostly of low-lying farmland, along with 3 residential streets, Westend Parade, Westend Terrace and Alney Terrace. Parts of the island are sometimes subject to flooding when the Severn rises. Castle Meads electrical substation on Alney was turned off when the island was flooded during the Summer 2007 United Kingdom floods. In February 2014, Royal Marines and Army personnel were deployed to Alney Island to respond to severe flooding.

Telford's historic Over Bridge links Alney to Over across the West Channel, and is now pedestrian use only. The A40 and A417 trunk roads cross the West Channel on modern road bridges onto Alney before crossing the East Channel to join Gloucester at the end of Westgate Street. There are a number of Segregated Bicycle Paths around Alney. Alney is also crossed by the original South Wales Railway between Gloucester and Cardiff Central.

== See also ==
- Herefordshire and Gloucestershire Canal
