= Over Bridge =

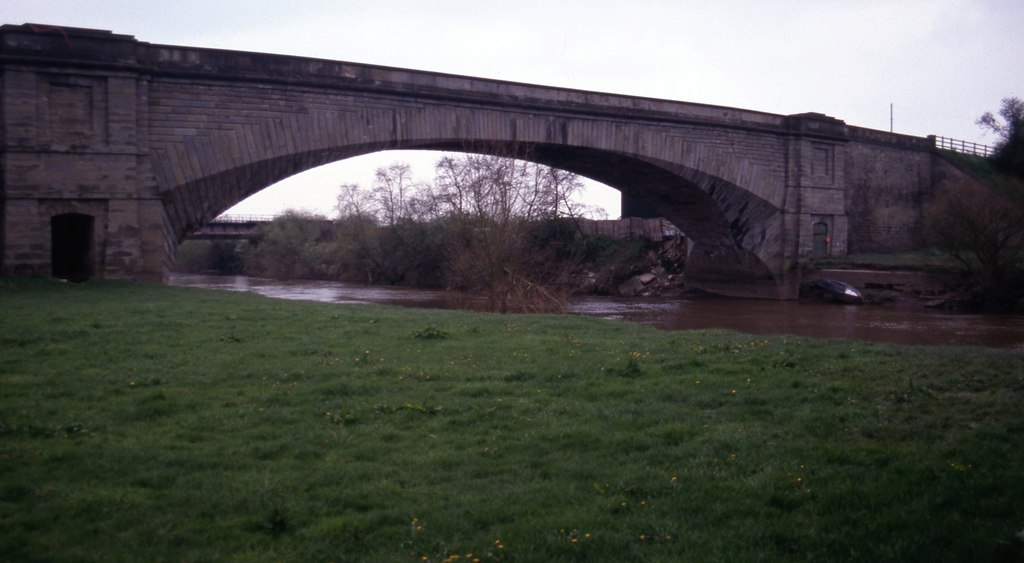
- Coordinates: 51°52′28″N 2°16′5″W
- Crosses: West Channel of the River Severn near Gloucester
- Locale: Gloucester, England
- Heritage status: Scheduled monument

Characteristics
- Material: Stone
- Total length: 150 ft (46 m)
- No. of spans: Single arch

History
- Designer: Thomas Telford
- Construction start: 1825
- Construction end: 1828

Location
- Interactive map of Over Bridge

Over Bridge, also known as Telford's Bridge, is a single-span stone arch bridge spanning the canalised West Channel of the River Severn near Gloucester, England. It links Over to Alney Island.

Although there was a crossing at Over recorded in the Domesday Book, this bridge was built by Thomas Telford between 1825 and 1828, to carry traffic east–west. It was opened in 1830 and remained in use for traffic until 1974. Until the Severn Bridge was built in the 1960s, this was the lowest point downstream that the Severn could be crossed by road bridge.

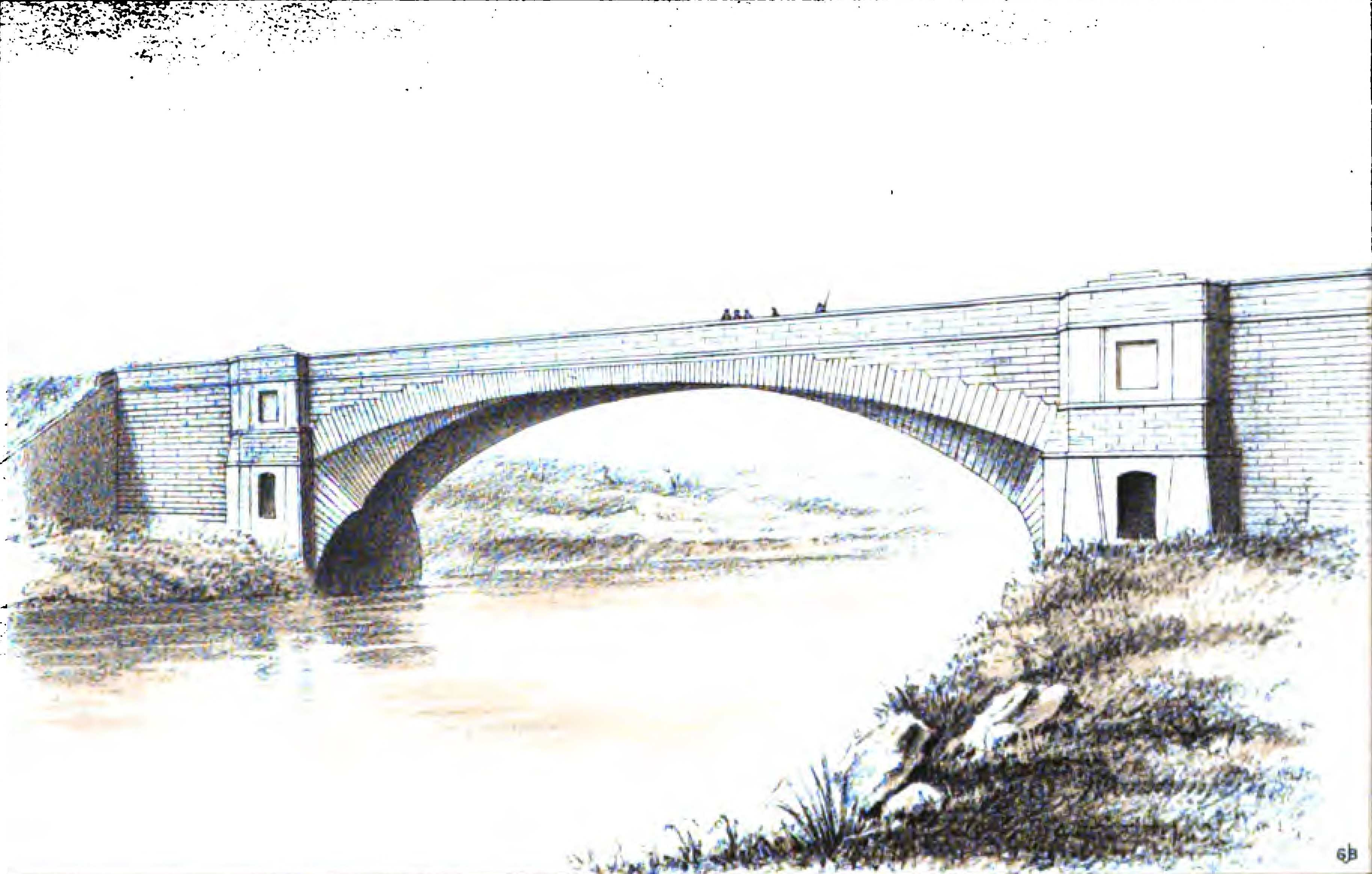
1887 engraving

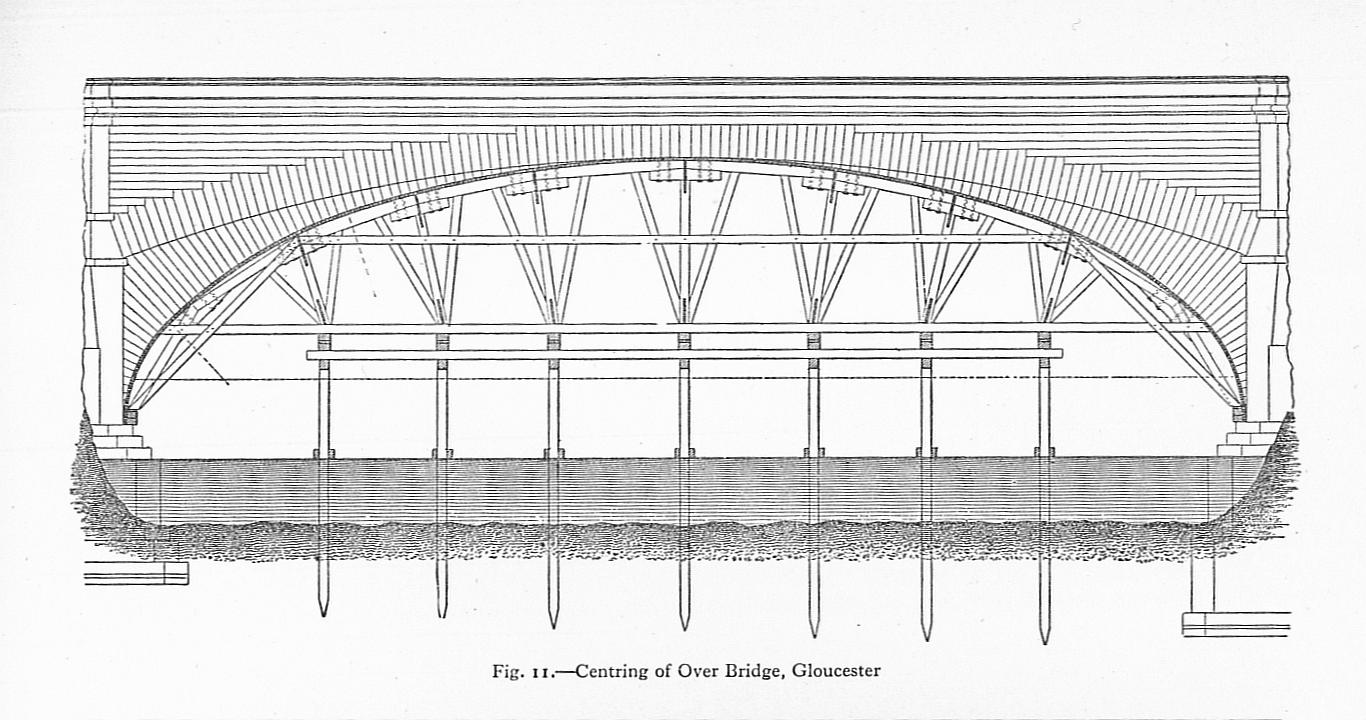
Wooden centring used during its construction

The arch spans 150 ft (46 m), and was based on Jean-Rodolphe Perronet's 1774 design for a bridge over the River Seine at Neuilly. It combines both an elliptical profile over most of the soffit with a segmental profile at its faces. This feature is known as a corne de vache (French for cow's horn).

When built, the arch sank by 2 in (5.1 cm) when its timber centring was removed, and another 8 in (20 cm) due to settlement of the arch foundations.

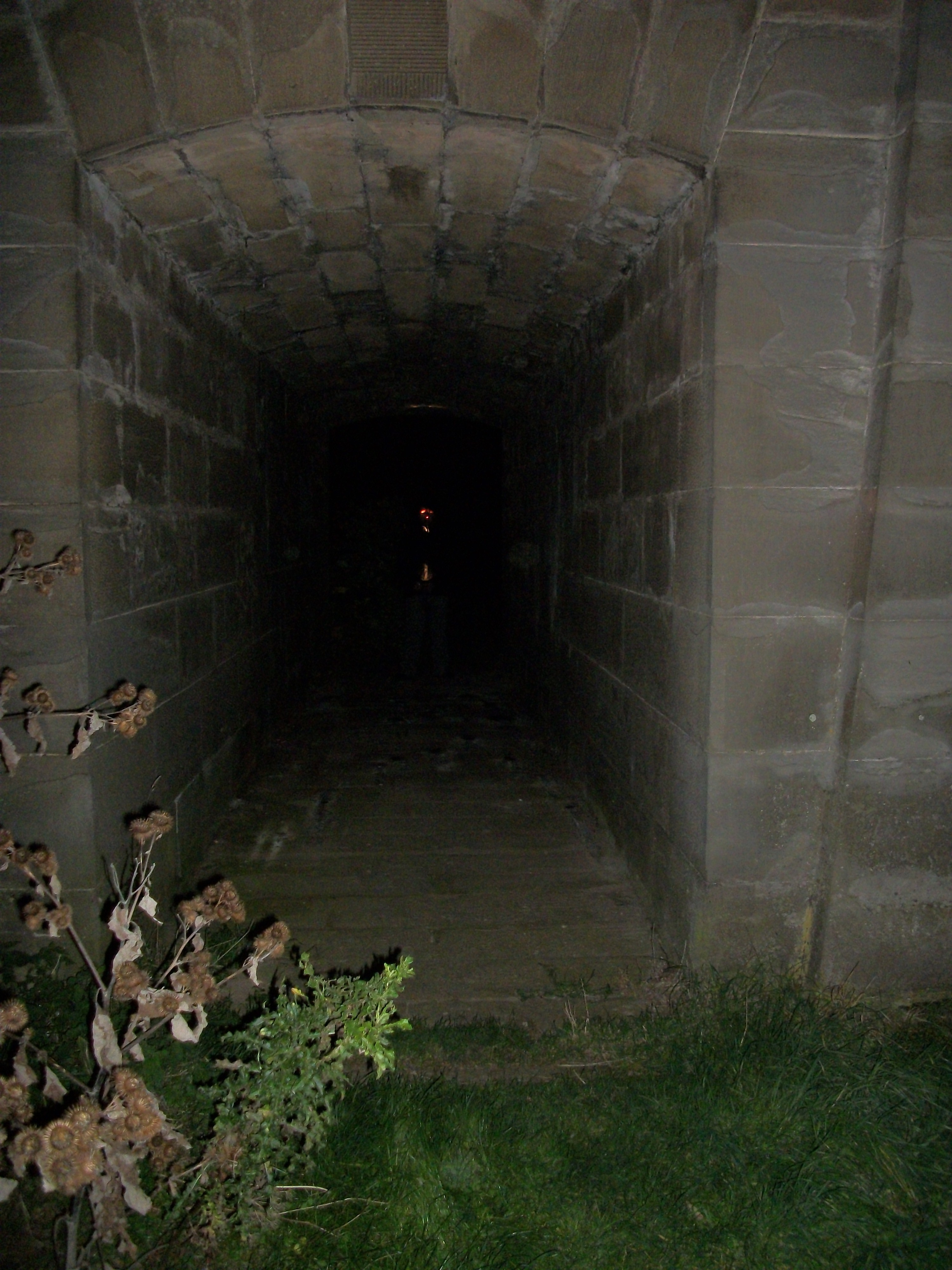
Underneath the bridge

Today it is a pedestrian-only bridge, and is in the guardianship of Historic England as a scheduled monument. Road traffic on the A40 crosses the Severn on a new bridge alongside and upstream of it.

This is the last road bridge over the Severn before the Severn Crossings, and was the most downstream free crossing until tolls were removed from the Severn Bridge and Second Severn Crossing in December 2018, although the Severn Bridge already had free access for pedestrians, cyclists and mopeds and, as previously stated, there is no vehicular access to Over Bridge. The bridge is connected by segregated bicycle paths around Alney Island, to Highnam and Gloucester.

The Over Bridge can be seen from the train travelling from Gloucester on the way to Lydney or Chepstow on the Gloucester to Newport section of the former South Wales Railway.

== See also ==
- List of crossings of the River Severn
