= William Singleton (politician) =

English politician

William Singleton was an English politician who sat in the House of Commons in 1640. He fought briefly on the side of the Parliamentarians in the English Civil War.

Singleton may have been the son of Thomas Singleton, merchant of London and Gloucester. He was a draper. He was Sheriff of Gloucester in 1618. He was elected as an alderman in 1635 and became Mayor of Gloucester in 1637.

In April 1640, Singleton was elected Member of Parliament for Gloucester in the Short Parliament. He was a captain in the regiment of Colonel Henry Stephens in the defence of Gloucester in 1643. He was Mayor of Gloucester again in 1651.

Singleton married Martha Lane, daughter of William Lane of Gloucester at St Nicholas Church on 21 June 1624.

Parliament of England
| Parliament suspended since 1629 | Member of Parliament for Gloucester; 1640; With: Henry Brett | Succeeded by Thomas Pury; Henry Brett |
