= Thomas Machen =

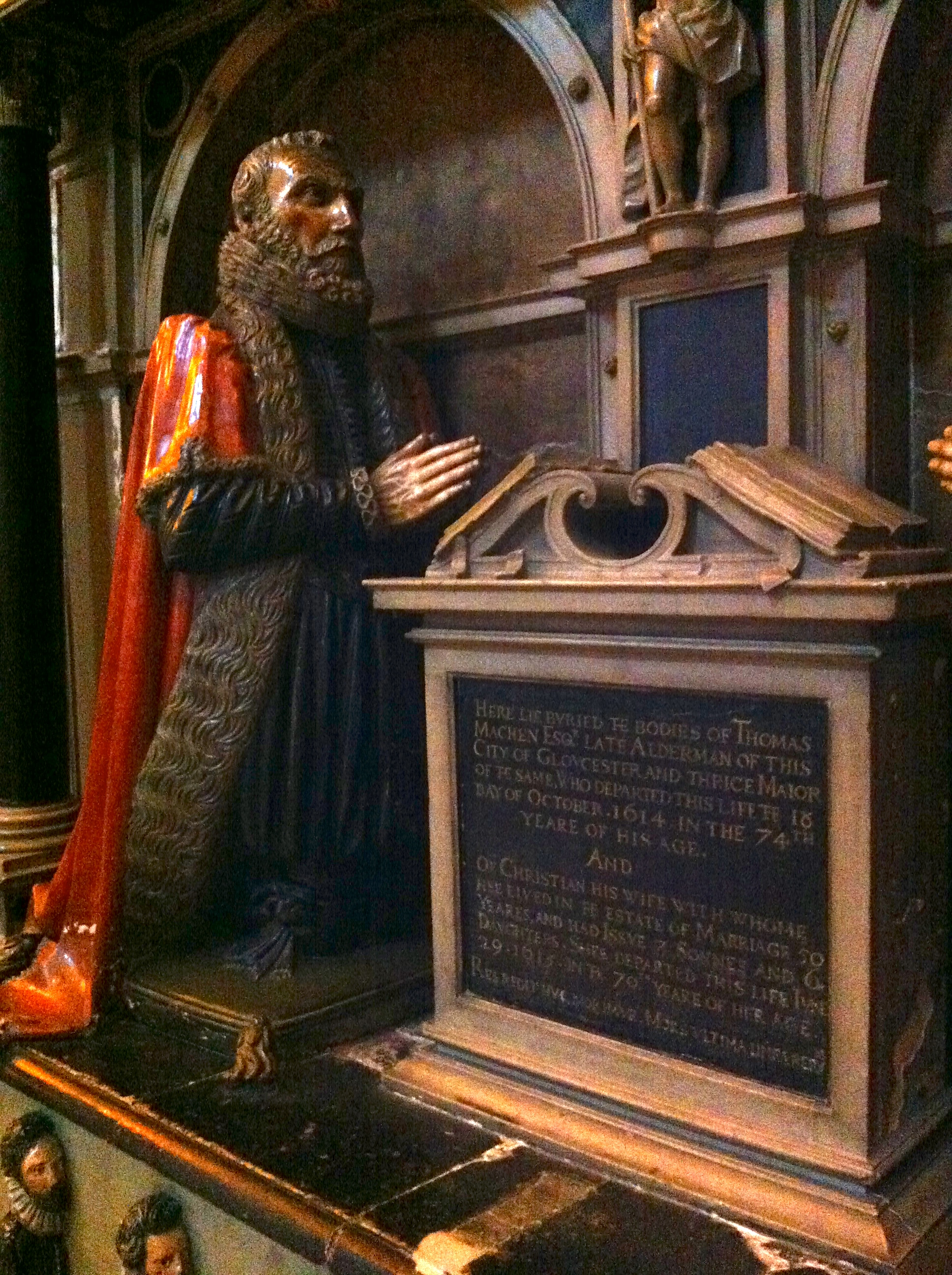
- Figure of Thomas Machen from his memorial in Gloucester Cathedral
- Born: c. 1541
- Died: 18 October 1614
- Occupation: Mercer
- Known for: Mayor of Gloucester and Member of Parliament

Thomas Machen (c. 1541–18 October 1614) was a mercer who was mayor of Gloucester three times and sat in the House of Commons in 1614.

Machen was the son of Henry Machen (d. 1566) and his wife, whose surname may have been Baugh or Brayh. He was possibly the Thomas Machin who in 1562 supplicated for his MA at Oxford University, where three of his sons were later educated. By 1566 he had married Christian Baston (c.1546–1615); they had seven sons and six daughters.

Thomas Machen and his father Henry Machen were the two Sheriffs of Gloucester 1555. Thomas Machen was again Sheriff 1572, 1576, and Mayor in 1579, 1588, and 1601. He was lord of the manor of Condicote in 1608 and was elected as the Member of Parliament for Gloucester in 1613, serving in the Addled Parliament of 1614.

He died on 18 October 1614, leaving considerable property, including Condicote manor, and bequeathed more than £4,000 (equivalent to £942,000 in 2023) to his family and to various charities.

His monument survives, and is one of the more elaborate to be found in Gloucester Cathedral. In it he is represented kneeling in his mayoral robes, facing his wife. Also featured are their 13 children.

Parliament of England
Preceded by Nicholas Overbury; John Jones	Member of Parliament for Gloucester; 1614; With: John Browne	Succeeded by John Browne; Anthony Robinson
