= James Stephens (MP) =

James Stephens (died 1683) was an English politician who sat in the House of Commons between 1656 and 1660.

Stephens was the son of Richard Stephens of Estington and brother of Nathaniel Stephens, MP for Gloucestershire in 1628. He was Sheriff of Gloucester in 1639 and 1643 and was a member of the Grand Inquest that reported on the houses damaged by a July 1646 siege during the First English Civil War. He was Mayor of Gloucester for 1649–50.

In November 1656, Stephens was returned as Member of Parliament for Gloucester in the Second Protectorate Parliament when the elected candidate John Desborough chose to represent Somerset. Stephens was re-elected MP for Gloucester in 1659 in the Third Protectorate Parliament. He was appointed captain of the militia regiment of foot in Gloucester on 5 April 1660. He was also elected MP for Gloucester in the Convention Parliament in April 1660.

Stephens died in 1683 and was buried in St Nicholas' Church on 9 November 1683.

Parliament of England
Preceded by Thomas Pury; William Lenthall	Member of Parliament for Gloucester; 1656–1659; With: Thomas Pury 1656; Laurence Singleton 1659	Succeeded by John Lenthall; Thomas Pury
