= Westgate, Gloucester =

Area of Gloucester, England

Coordinates: 51.8668°N 2.2489°W

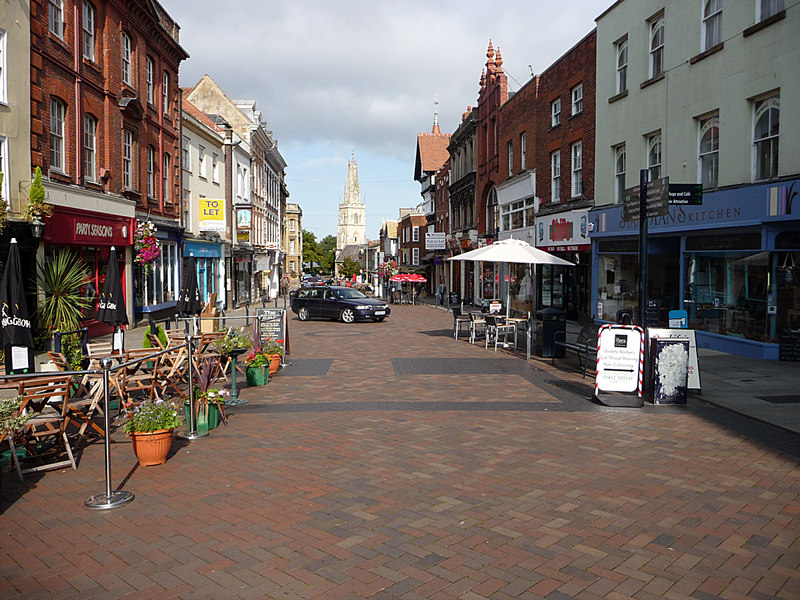
A 2009 view of Westgate Street with St Nicholas' Church in the distance and showing the modern pedestrianisation of the upper part.

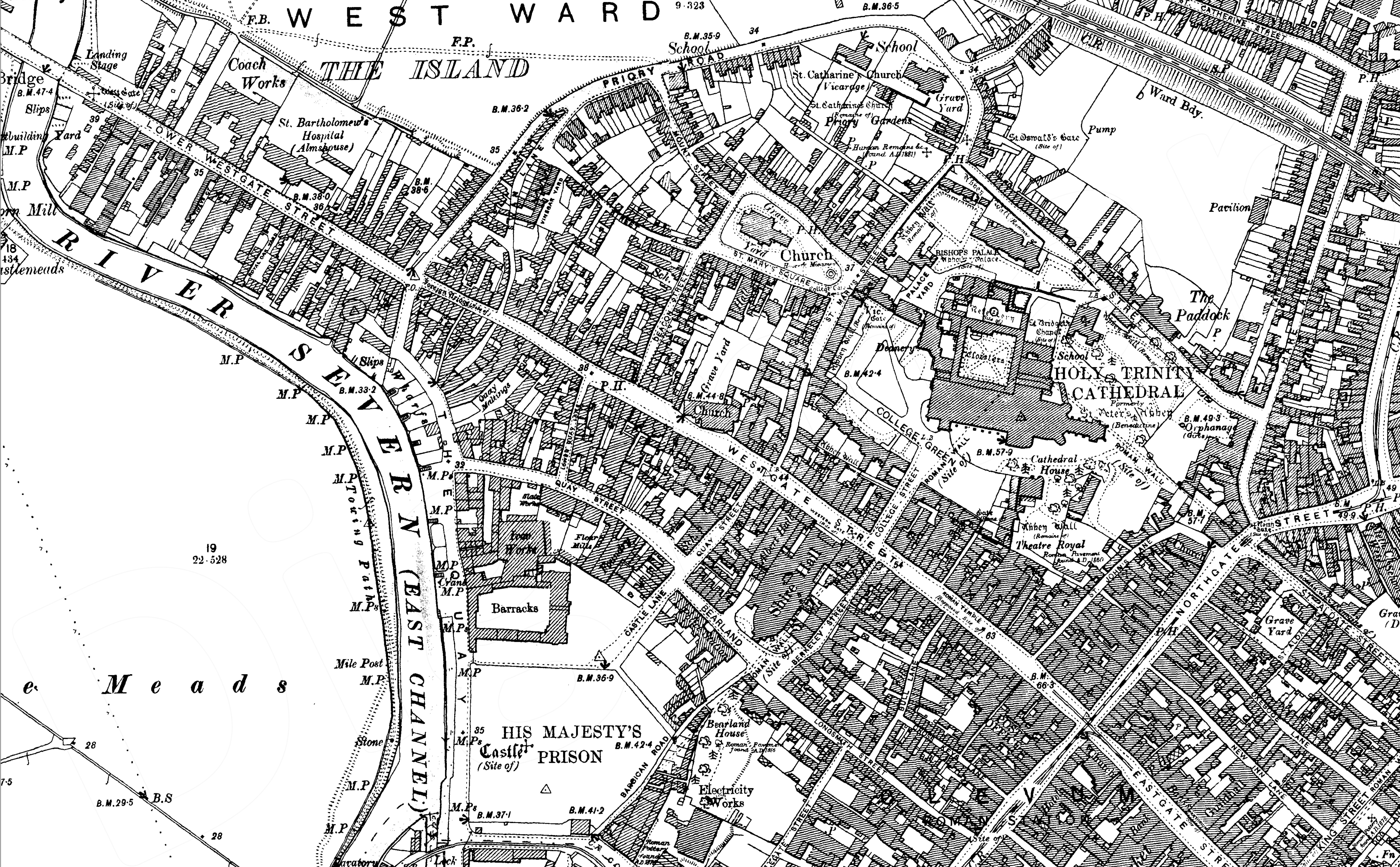
Westgate Street on a c.1900 Ordnance Survey map

The Westgate area of Gloucester is centred on Westgate Street, one of the four main streets of Gloucester and one of the oldest parts of the city. The population of the Westgate ward in Gloucester was 6,687 at the time of the 2011 Census.

== Notable buildings ==
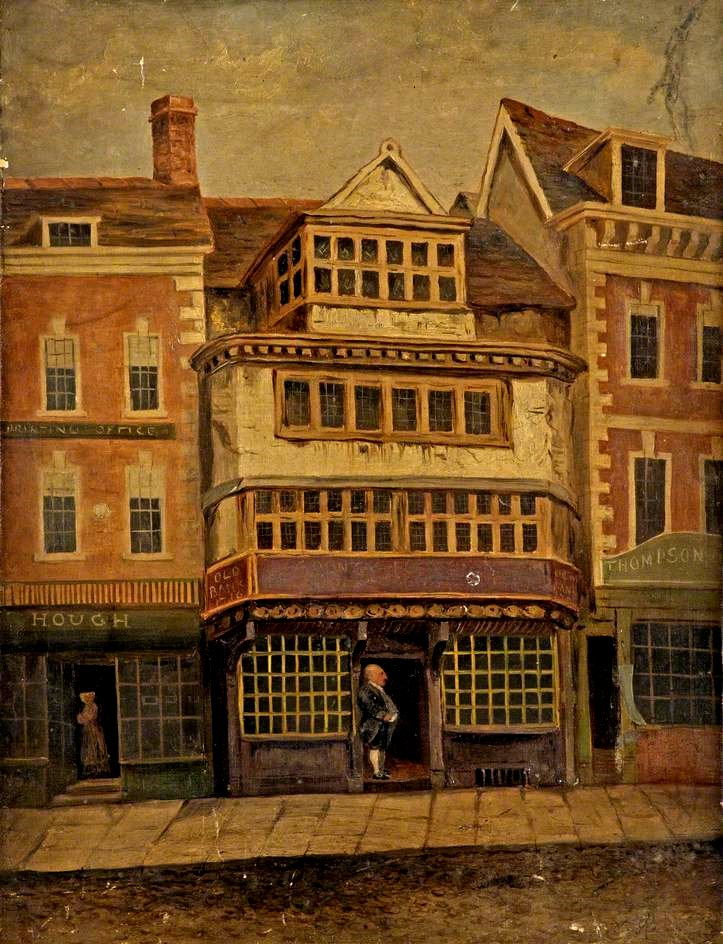
An 1828 painting of Gloucester Old Bank in Westgate Street, since demolished. In the collection of Gloucester City Museum & Art Gallery.

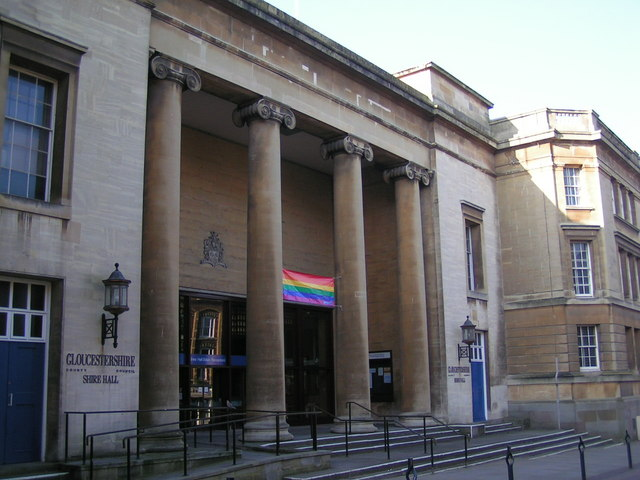
Main facade of the Shire Hall, Gloucester, designed by Sir Robert Smirke.

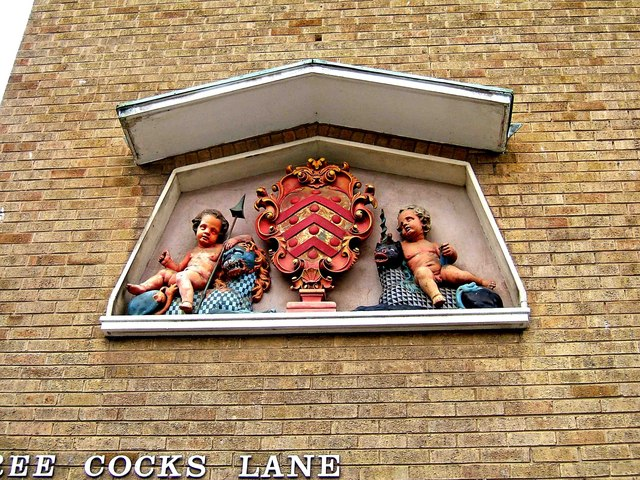
The sculpture of cherubs aside the coat of arms of Gloucester at the entrance to Three Cocks Lane, off Westgate Street. The sculpture originally adorned the pediment of the former Booth's Hall.

St. Nicholas' Church, a redundant Anglican church and Grade I listed building is situated at the far end of Westgate Street with Gloucester Folk Museum almost opposite. Gloucester Cathedral is not far away and the main entrance to the Cathedral precincts is via College Green from Westgate Street.

Next to St. Nicholas' Church is the Dick Whittington Tavern, known originally as St. Nicholas House, a 15th-century town house once owned by the Whittington family of the Tale of Dick Whittington and his Cat fame. The house was restored by Gloucester Civic Trust and Gloucester Historic Buildings Ltd in the 1980s. The Old Judges House, at No.26 is a Grade I listed building.

Just outside the western entrance to the Cathedral precincts is St. Mary de Lode Church in Archdeacon Street, reputed to be built on the site of the first Christian church in Britain and next to it, the monument to Bishop John Hooper, burnt at the stake there in 1555.

Just off Westgate street is the House of the Tailor of Gloucester, used by Beatrix Potter as the setting for the story of the same name.

The original part of Gloucester Shire Hall, opened 1816 and designed by Sir Robert Smirke, fronts Westgate Street.

On the north side of Westgate Street is the former site of the Theatre Royal where Charles Dickens, Sir Henry Irving and Ellen Terry once played. The site is now a Poundstretcher discount store.

== Notable inhabitants ==
Jemmy Wood, the legendary Gloucester Miser ran his Gloucester Old Bank from a medieval timber building at 22 Westgate Street, that remained until the nineteenth century. The building occupied by the bank was subsequently replaced by a Victorian Gothic building and more recently by a new building.

Further down the street is the home of the young Charles Wheatstone, the physicist - pioneer of telecommunications and cryptography (not to mention music acoustics etc.)

== Westgate Bridge ==
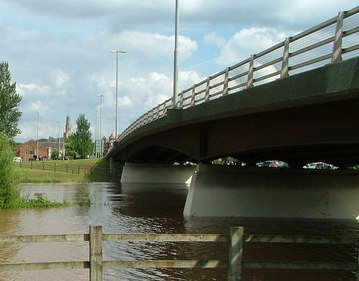
The modern Westgate Bridge showing the flooding to which the area below the bridge is prone.

The Westgate Bridge over the River Severn was once the longest in England. It has been replaced several times over its history.

The original medieval bridge had five great arches. In 1542 Sir Thomas Bell and his wife Joan assigned property on a sale and leaseback arrangement to the City Corporation to be used after their deaths for repairing Westgate Bridge and causeway.

In 1816, the medieval bridge was replaced by a single-span bridge designed by Sir Robert Smirke, architect of the British Museum, who also designed Gloucester Shire Hall, also in Westgate Street.

Until the first Severn Crossing was opened near Chepstow in 1966, the Westgate Bridge was the most southerly crossing point on the Severn for road traffic to or from Wales.

In the 1970s two new wide-span road bridges were built, one for each direction of traffic flow. Between these a separate foot and cycle bridge was also built. The two road bridges were replaced again in the late 1990s, opening in 2000.

There are a number of Segregated Bicycle Paths which use the central bridge connecting nearby villages via Alney Island.

== Politics ==
Westgate forms its own electoral ward in the constituency of Gloucester but it is not a parish and so does not have a parish council.

== See also ==
- Alney Island
