= John Head =

John Head may refer to:

- John Head (Gloucester MP) (died 1391), English politician
- John Head (Stockbridge MP) (c. 1656–1711), MP for Stockbridge 1689–93
- John L. Head (1915–1980), American basketball coach
- John Head (musician), English musician
- John Head (cricketer) (1868–1949), English cricketer
- John Head (peace activist) (1927–2007), founded CALM, the New Zealand Campaign Against Landmines in 1993
- John W. Head (1822–1874), American lawyer and politician
- John Head (priest) (1783–1862), Anglican priest in Ireland
