= Arthur Porter (MP) =

16th-century English politician

Arthur Porter (c. 1505 – 31 May 1559) was an English Member of Parliament (MP) and was granted Llanthony Secunda Priory. He was the only surviving son of Roger Porter of Newent and Alvington, Gloucestershire and was educated at Lincoln's Inn.

In 1526 he was appointed escheator of Gloucestershire and the Welsh Marches. He was a J.P. for Gloucestershire from 1537 to 1547 and appointed Sheriff of Gloucestershire for 1548. He acted as Receiver for the lands of Llantony Priory (Llantony Secunda) in 1539 and 1542, and in consequence was awarded a grant of the Priory lands in 1540. He acquired Pitchcombe manor near Painswick in 1544. He entered Parliament as knight of the shire for Gloucestershire in November 1554 and afterwards served as MP for the city of Gloucester in 1555 and Aylesbury in 1559. He died in office on 31 May 1559.

He married twice: firstly to Alice Arnold, the daughter of John Arnold of Churcham, Gloucestershire, with whom he had at least 12 children including Sir Thomas; and secondly to Isabel Denys, the daughter of Sir William Denys of Dyrham, Gloucestershire, and widow of Sir John Berkeley (died c. 1548).

Parliament of England
Preceded by Thomas Bell; William Massinger	Member of Parliament for Gloucester; 1554; With: William Massinger	Succeeded by Richard Pates; Thomas Payne
