= Harold Arthur Guy =

British car dealer and politician

Col. Harold Arthur Guy OBE (April 1898 – 1980), was a British Motor car dealer and Liberal Party politician.

== Background ==
Guy was born in Weymouth, Dorset in April 1898. He married Nora. In March 1945 he was awarded the OBE.

== Professional career ==
Guy served in the 1914-1918 war in the Royal Navy. He served as a Major in the Royal Army Ordnance Corps. In 1939 he was evacuated from the beaches at Dunkirk. He was with the Canadian forces for 2–3 years. He served at the HQ of 21 Army Group under Field Marshal Montgomery. He was managing director of Cheltenham & Gloucester Car Mart Limited. He was President of the Motor Agents Association. He was President of the British Motor Trade Association. He was President of Gloucester Chamber of Trade. He was President of the Gloucester Rotary Club.

== Political career ==
Guy was Liberal candidate for the Gloucester division of Gloucestershire at the 1945 General Election;

General Election 1945: Gloucester
Party	Candidate	Votes	%	±%
Labour	Moss Turner-Samuels	14,010	46.99	
Conservative	Harold Leslie Boyce	10,466	35.10	
Liberal	Col. Harold Arthur Guy	5,338	17.90	
Majority		3,544	11.89	
Turnout			74.36	
Labour gain from Conservative		Swing		

In 1946 he became Chairman of the Gloucester group of hospitals under the National Health Service Act 1946. In February 1947 he was part of a group of Liberal candidates from the 1945 elections who signed up in support of the pamphlet 'Design For Freedom' which sought a merger of Liberals with Conservatives creating a new centre party. He was again Liberal candidate for the Gloucester division of Gloucestershire at the 1950 General Election;

General Election 1950: Gloucester
Party	Candidate	Votes	%	±%
Labour	Moss Turner-Samuels	20,202	47.70	
Conservative	John Anthony Kershaw	15,708	37.09	
Liberal	Harold Arthur Guy	6,444	15.21	
Majority		4,494	10.61	
Turnout			86.60	
Labour hold		Swing		

He did not stand for parliament again and died in Gloucestershire, England in 1980.
