= Bisley =

Bisley may refer to:

Places in England

- Bisley, Gloucestershire
- Bisley, Surrey
  - National Shooting Centre, also known as Bisley Ranges, near the Surrey village

Surname

- John Bisley (disambiguation)
- Simon Bisley, British comic book artist
- Mary Caroline Bisley, memoirist of early settler life in New Zealand
- Steve Bisley (born 1951), Australian actor

Other

- Bisley, the initial name for the ground attack version of the Bristol Blenheim bomber of World War II
- Bisley (solitaire), a solitaire card game
- a variant of the Colt Single Action Army revolver
- an office furniture manufacturer founded in Surrey, England in 1931
