= William Goldsmith (disambiguation) =

William Goldsmith is an American drummer.

William Goldsmith may also refer to:

- William Goldsmith (MP for Bridgnorth) for Bridgnorth (UK Parliament constituency) in 1388
- William Goldsmith alias Smith (died 1517), MP for Gloucester (UK Parliament constituency)
