= John Phillpotts =

John Phillpotts may refer to:

- John Phillpotts (MP), English politician
- John Phillpotts (land agent), his father, landowner and entrepreneur

== See also ==
- John Philpot, English Protestant martyr
