= Dalby (surname) =

Dalby is a Scandinavian place name meaning "valley settlement". During the Viking Age, the name was brought to England and it later also became an English surname. It can be a locational surname for those from Dalby, Lincolnshire, near Spilsby; in Dalby, Leicestershire near Melton Mowbray, and in Dalby, North Yorkshire, near Terrington. Notable people with the surname include:

- Amy Dalby, British actress
- Andrew Dalby, linguist and culinary writer
- Andy Dalby, guitarist
- Claire Dalby, British artist
- Christie Dalby, American Performer
- C. Reginald Dalby, British illustrator
- Dave Dalby, former NFL football player
- David Dalby, British linguist, founder of Linguasphere Observatory
- Gina Dalby, American Performer
- Greg Dalby, American soccer player
- Håkan Dahlby, Swedish double trap shooter
- Irene Dalby, Norwegian swimmer
- Isaac Dalby (1744–1824), English mathematician and surveyor
- John Dalby (1929–2017), English singer and composer
- John Dalby (painter) (1810–1865), English painter
- Liza Dalby (born 1950), American anthropologist and writer
- Matthew Dalby, British scientist
- Mark Dalby (1938–2013), British Anglican archdeacon
- Martin Dalby (1942–2018), Scottish composer
- Nicolas Dalby, Danish mixed martial artist
- Richard Dalby (disambiguation)
- Robert Dalby, English martyr
- William Bartlett Dalby (1840–1918), British aural surgeon and otologist
