= Richard de Bruges =

English politician

Richard de Bruges (fl. 1328) was an English politician. He sat as MP for Bridgnorth in 1328.

He was related to John de Brugge, who sat as MP for Bridgnorth and Herefordshire.
