= Andrew de Pendok =

Member of Parliament for Gloucester
- In office 1307–1309
- Preceded by: Richard le Clerk
- Succeeded by: William de Hertford
- In office 1319 – May 1322
- Preceded by: Walter le Spicer
- Succeeded by: John de Hereford
- In office January 1324 – 1327
- Preceded by: John de Hereford
- Succeeded by: John Brayton
- In office July 1338 – January 1339
- Preceded by: John de Coueleye
- Succeeded by: Hugh de Aylbrighton

Andrew de Pendok was an English politician who served as the member of Parliament for Gloucester during various periods throughout the early 1300s.
