= Le Espicer =

Le Espicer is a surname. Notable people with the surname include:

- Robert le Espicer, Gloucester MP
- John le Espicer, York MP
