= Roger Ball =

Roger Ball may refer to:

- Roger Ball (designer), professor of industrial design at the Hong Kong Polytechnic University
- Roger Ball (musician) (born 1944), Scottish saxophonist, keyboardist, songwriter and arranger
- Roger Ball (MP) (fl. 1395–1407), English politician
