= John de Hertford =

Member of Parliament for Gloucester
- In office 1319–1320
- Preceded by: Walter le Spicer
- Succeeded by: John de Brugge
- In office November 1322 – January 1324
- Preceded by: Andrew de Pendok
- Succeeded by: Andrew de Pendok

John de Hertford was an English politician who served as the member of Parliament for Gloucester in two parliaments during the early 1300s.

== See also ==
- William de Hertford
