= Boyce baronets =

Baronetcy in the Baronetage of the United Kingdom

Escutcheon of the Boyce baronets of Badgeworth

The Boyce baronetcy, of Badgeworth in the County of Gloucester, is a title in the Baronetage of the United Kingdom. It was created on 24 November 1952 for the politician Leslie Boyce. He represented Gloucester in the House of Commons from 1929 to 1945. As of 2026 the title is held by his grandson, the 3rd Baronet, who succeeded his father in 1968.

== Boyce baronets, of Badgeworth (1952) ==
- Sir (Harold) Leslie Boyce, 1st Baronet (1895–1955)
- Sir Richard Leslie Boyce, 2nd Baronet (1929–1968)
- Sir Robert Charles Leslie Boyce, 3rd Baronet (born 1962)

The heir apparent is the present holder's son Thomas Leslie Boyce (born 1993).
