= John Bisley =

John Bisley may refer to:

- John Bisley (fl. 1382–1391), MP for Gloucester
- John Bisley (fl. 1406–1421), MP for Gloucester
