= Thomas Bell (mayor of Gloucester) =

English cap manufacturer, mayor of Gloucester and MP (1486–1566)

Sir Thomas Bell the Elder. Gloucester City Museum. Legend: top left: "Thomas Bell, knight. 3 times Mayor of the Cittie of Gloster". Top right: "He did wel for the poore provide. His righteousness shal still remaine and his estate with praise abide surpassing gold & worldly gayne"

Sir Thomas Bell the Elder (1486–1566) was a cap manufacturer, mayor of Gloucester, and member of Parliament. He was one of the city's largest employers and wealthiest citizens and a great benefactor of the city and its people. He is described in contemporaneous documents as a "capper". He invested much of his wealth in real estate released on the dissolution of the monasteries, sometimes in partnership with Richard Duke (c. 1515–1572), of Otterton, Devon, Clerk of the Court of Augmentations.

He was thrice Mayor of Gloucester (1535–36, 1543–44 and 1553–54) and served four times as Member of Parliament (MP) for the city (1545–47, 1547–52, 1553 and 1554–55). He was knighted on 27 February 1546/7.

He appears to have held orthodox Roman Catholic religious views: in 1537, while mayor, he was accused by leading townsmen John Huggins and John Rastell of calling Bishop Latimer of Worcester a heretic.

A portrait of Bell the Elder is in the possession of Gloucester City Council. He is not to be confused with his younger brother (possibly half-brother), also called Thomas, also prominent, Sir Thomas Bell the Younger (d. 1560/1), Mayor of Bristol, who also served as Mayor of Gloucester in 1543 and 1554–5.

== Family origins ==
The 1623 Visitation of Gloucestershire reveals nothing as to the parentage of the Bell brothers. The Gloucester family was possibly descended from the ancient de Belne family of Worcestershire. Evidence from armorials does not suggest any link to John Bell (d. 1556), Bishop of Worcester. It does not seem likely that this family was directly related to the Bells of Berkshire, Yorkshire or Norfolk.

=== Capper (Cap Manufacturer) ===
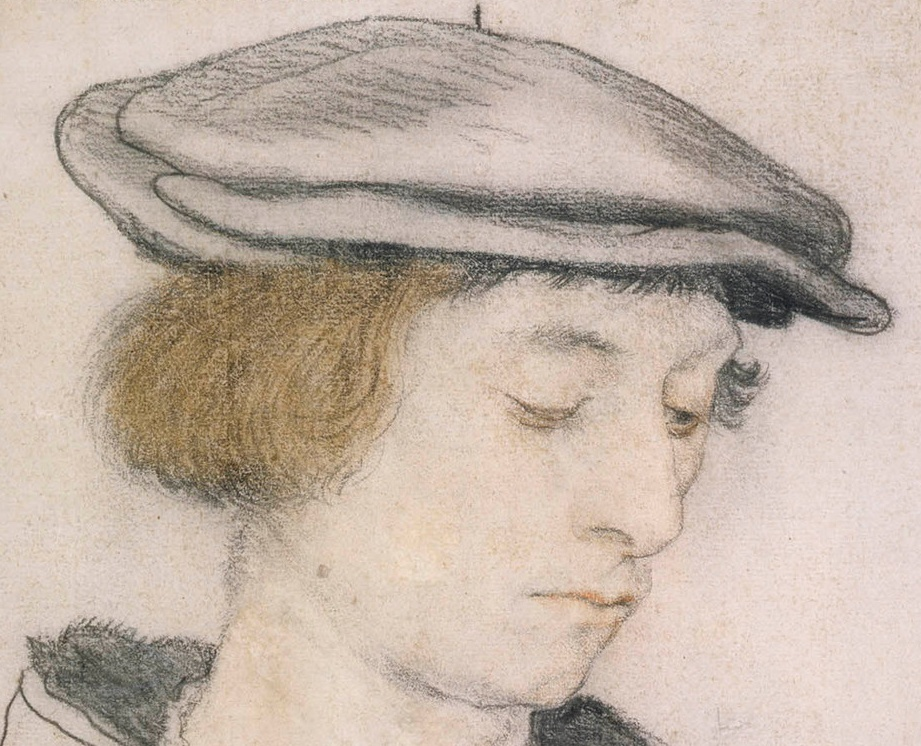
A Tudor cap, as worn by John More (1508-c. 1559) son of Sir Thomas More. Detail of drawing by Holbein, Royal Collection, Windsor.

Gloucestershire was a centre of the wool and cloth industries, and the city of Gloucester became a nexus for this trade. Bell may have made the Tudor beret-style flat cap worn by members of higher society (as illustrated) or possibly the coarser style cap, later known as the "Statute Cap", which was the model approved by the 1571 statute making the wearing of caps compulsory on Holy Days, a measure designed to support the manufacturing industry. Bell Snr. was one of the largest manufacturers in the city, rivalled only by John Falconer (d. 1545), thrice Mayor of Gloucester. They employed large numbers of people: Bell up to 300. After purchasing the Monastery of the Blackfriars in 1539, he transformed it into a cap factory, which was noticed at the time by John Leland the antiquary, who remarked, "The Blakefriers stood withe in the towne not far from the castle. This hows is by one Bell made a drapinge howse." He may therefore also have made general drapery, and gloves, as is sometimes suggested. Bell's period was the high water mark for the trade, which fell off rapidly from around the time of his death in the 1560s. From his business he became the wealthiest citizen of Gloucester.

=== Trustee of Crypt Grammar School ===
One of the earliest references to Bell in the Gloucester Archives is his appointment in 1528, together with his younger brother, as one of 10 original trustees of the Crypt Grammar School founded by John Cooke (d. 1528), mercer and four times Mayor of Gloucester. A further deed in this connection, dated 1535, describes Bell as an "Alderman of Gloucester".

== Purchase of Dissolved Monastic Property ==
Bell Snr. was the main purchaser of such properties in Gloucester, and thus became the city's largest private landowner.

=== Blackfriars monastery ===
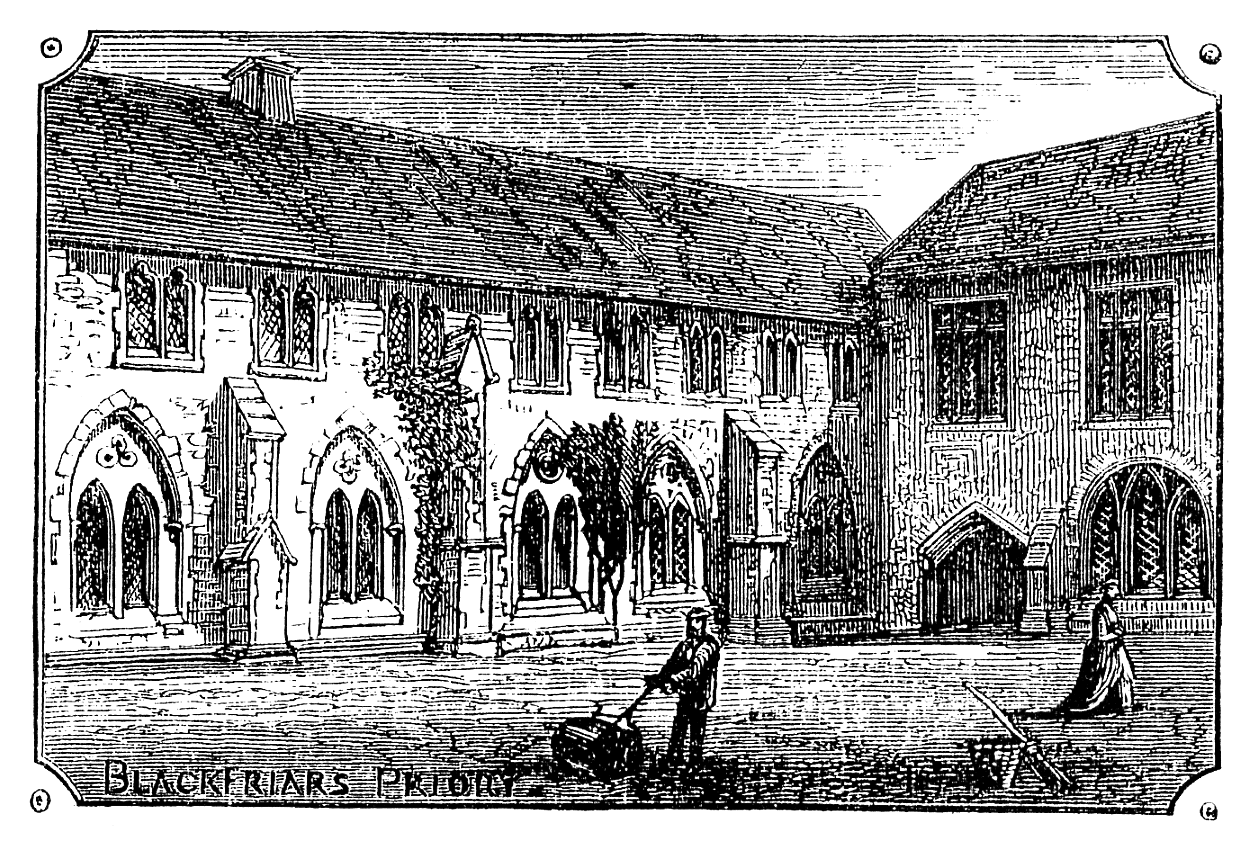
Blackfriars Monastery in 1873

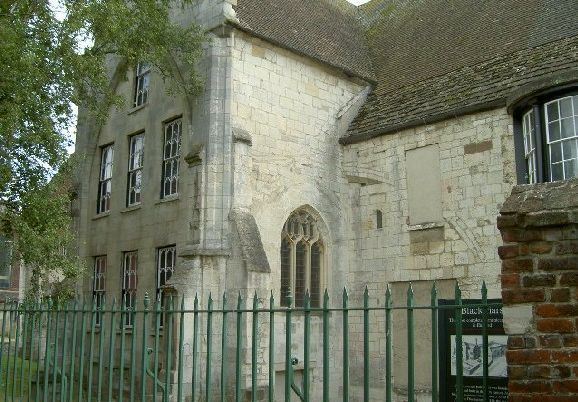
Bell Place today, view from NW, showing the former great window at the end of the N. Transept

The monastery known as Blackfriars, Gloucester of the Dominican Friars, named from the black habits they wore, was founded c. 1239, on a site west of Southgate Street, with the city wall adjacent to the south. Following the Dissolution of the Monasteries Bell and his wife Joan purchased the site in 1539 for £240, including property of Llanthony. The buildings of the cloister, including the scriptorium, he transformed into a factory, while he converted the church itself into a grand mansion, completed by 1545, which he referred to in his will as "My howse called Bell Place". The nave and chancel were each shortened by about half, either side of the central crossing, of which the southern member, extending into the cloister, was removed. Upper floors and stone mullioned windows were added above the outer aisles, and a semi-circular bay window was also added to the north side of the nave. The great window at the north end of the northern transept was built in, and replaced with several smaller windows. In the 1930s Bell Place was converted into two dwellings. Restoration work on this former church was completed in 1984, when it was opened to the public. The cloister buildings were converted from the former cap factory into dwellings in the 18th century, and part of the west range was heightened and converted into three houses. Bell bequeathed Blackfriars to his niece Joan and her husband Thomas Denys, son of Sir Walter Denys of Dyrham Park, in which family it remained until c. 1700. Both the ancient gateways to the Blackfriars have been removed, one before 1724, the other having collapsed c. 1750. One had become known as Lady Bell's Gate, which is commemorated in the modern street name "Ladybellegate", onto which the western cloister faces. The site is today the most complete surviving Dominican priory in Britain, containing the oldest surviving library.

=== Whitefriars Monastery ===
The Monastery of Carmelite Friars, called Whitefriars after the colour of their apparel, was founded c. 1268, near Brook St. outside the walls at the NE corner of the city. On Dissolution it was sold by the Crown to two speculators who sold it on to Thomas Bell and his wife Joan. They donated the site as part of the foundation of the 1562 trust Kimbrose Hospital. Most of the buildings were demolished by 1567, but the barn remained and played an important role in the Civil War, serving to house a battery for the city's defenders. That too was demolished c. 1800, and now the site's appellation of "Friar's Ground" is the only memorial of its history.

=== Llanthony Secunda Priory ===
Llanthony Secunda was a second house founded by the first Augustinian Llanthony Priory in Wales. By the 16th century, it had become the largest Augustinian house in England, and the 10th richest. On Dissolution the site itself was purchased by Arthur Porter, but many of the properties with which the Priory had been endowed were purchased by Bell in 1539, with further purchase in 1542 for £100. In 1543 he purchased the bulk of the remnant of Llanthony for £627, together with property of other monastic houses. Bell bequeathed this significant property to his niece Joan and her husband Thomas Denys. Arthur Porter's son Sir Thomas Porter married Ann Denys, daughter of Richard Denys and niece of Thomas Denys, Bell's heir.

== Establishment of Bridge Repair and "Uses Lands" Trust ==
In 1542 Sir Thomas Bell and his wife Joan assigned property on a sale and leaseback arrangement to the City Corporation to be used after their deaths for repairing Westgate Bridge and causeway, Gloucester:

Conveyance by Alderman Thomas Bell Sen. of property in Broadsmith St., Southgate St., Gaudy Green and Brook St. to use of the Corporation for repairing Westgate Bridge and Over causeway, then for uses to be determined by the Corporation.

John Leland the antiquary commented as follows: "Bell a marchaunt of Gloucestar now livinge, consideringe to be a common-wealth bridges and cawseys, and to the towne of Gloucester, hath gyven x li. (i.e. £10) lands the yere toward the mayntenans of these bridges" The transaction was a three-stage process, firstly the conveyance described above, then a quitclaim by Bell followed by a lease back by the corporation to Bell, all in 1542. The trust so established became known in the corporation's records as "Sir Thomas Bell's Uses Lands", since after the bridge had been repaired the corporation was free to employ the fund for any other use. The lands were sold by the Corporation c. 1800 "for redemption of the land tax"

== Chantries Purchased ==
=== Chantries and Obits in St Mary de Crypt Church ===
Bell purchased in 1548, with Richard Duke (clerk of the court from 1536 until 1554) the former chantry of St Catherine established at that saint's altar in St. Mary de Crypt Church, Gloucester. It had been established by the will of Garet van Eck in 1506 and comprised originally 100 marks, a house, vestments and plate. Its income in 1548 was £7 6s 4d, swelled by endowments subsequently received, including a stable and garden in the city and property in Lydney and Ripple, Worcestershire. The tomb recess and tombchest of Sir Thomas Bell and his wife Joan situated in the south chapel suggests the location of the former altar to St. Catherine. Two kneeling figures from this tomb were moved to the crypt c. 1840. Bell and Duke also purchased in 1548 a former obit (Latin meaning he is dead, similar to a chantry in purpose) for Richard Manchester, which owned a tenement producing income of 22s.

=== Chantry in St Mary de Lode Church ===
The pair also purchased in 1548 two burgages formerly owned by the Chantry of St Mary within St Mary de Lode Church.

=== Chantry in St Nicholas's Church ===
Bell also purchased land in Gloucester, Tredworth, and elsewhere, with a rent of 12d., in Pedmarsh field, all of which had been previously employed in supporting St Mary's chantry at St Nicholas' church in Gloucester.

=== Chantry in St Owen's Church ===
Also purchased by Bell was a part of the endowments of St Mary's chantry at St Owen's church, in Gloucester.

=== Chantry Property, Llanthony ===
Bell purchased in 1548 part of the chantry property under Llanthony.

== Founds Kimbrose Hospital ==
Bell Snr. was the founder of the Kimbrose Hospital (spelt Kymbrose in the founding deeds, modern spelling Kimbrose), named after the adjacent long-established and ancient St Kyneburgh's chapel.

=== Life of St Kyneburg ===
St Kyneburgh was a female 7th-century Mercian saint, daughter of the pagan King Penda of Mercia. She married King Ealhfrith, co-regent of Northumbria (who attended the Synod of Whitby in 664), but left him to establish an abbey at Castor, near Peterborough, Northamptonshire, of which she became the first abbess. She was buried in her church, but her remains were translated, before 972, to Peterborough Abbey. She had been one of the signatories, together with her brother Wulfhere, of the founding charter of Burh Abbey, dated 664, per William Dugdale's Monasticon. (Burh Abbey was later dedicated to St Peter, becoming "Peterborough"). She was much esteemed as a saint by the monks of Peterborough, and features as one of the saints remembered annually on 6 March. in several ancient Peterborough-produced Kalendars, (a section of a psalter). There was another lady by the name of Kyneburg, the wife of King Oswald. In May 2010, following the discovery by workmen of two ancient buried coffins containing skeletons near Kimbrose Way, Gloucester, the local press published another version of the life of St Kyneburg - or possibly the story of a different Kyneburg, known as the Virgin of Gloucester. derives from a 15th-century manuscript, itself itemised as No.387 of the Lansdown Papers held in the British Museum. It said that she was a virgin of Royal Saxon descent who fled an arranged marriage by becoming adopted by a Gloucester baker. The baker's wife became jealous and killed Kyneburg, then threw her down a well, on the site of which the chapel was later built. The bodies were discovered in the vicinity of the chapel site on 4 May 2010. This version may well be apocryphal, and sounds like many a tale contained within a mediaeval Lives of the Saints; though it is not the one given for St Kyneburg, nor is in the Rev. Alban Butler's authoritative work Lives of the Fathers, Martyrs and other Principal Saints published in 1866. Butler in volume 2, under "6th. March" relates the history of Kyneburg as a daughter of King Penda, as above related.

=== Chapel of St Kyneburg at Gloucester ===
St Kyneburgh's Chapel was established in early times at Gloucester dedicated to that saint, and was transferred with all its lands to Llanthony Secunda Priory by Roger Earl of Hereford between 1143 and 1155. It was situated inside Gloucester's city wall at the south gate.

=== Purchase of Chapel of St Kyneburg by Bell ===
In 1543, following the Dissolution, with part of it having already been demolished, Bell had purchased the site and an adjoining cottage from the Crown. In 1559, by then an old man, perhaps as a final charitable gesture to ease his path to Heaven, Bell built a "Hospital" or almshouse to the east of the cottage, comprising a low terrace of five individual rooms each with its own front door. ("Hospital" in this ancient sense refers to the function of sheltering guests, from the Latin hospes, a stranger, foreigner, hence a guest.) The original cottage itself formed a 6th almshouse, the body of the chapel being used by the almsmen for prayers. Bell drafted his will in the same year leaving it, with endowments to fund its continuation, to the City Corporation. However, 3 years later in 1562, altering his plan, Bell and his wife settled it instead on a body of 10 trustees, among whom were William Bell of Sandhurst his nephew and Thomas Denys, husband of his niece Joan, thus establishing it as a trust, who took possession after the deaths of Bell and his wife Joan in 1566 and 1567 respectively. Under the terms of the trust deed the hospital was to maintain six poor people, one of them, if possible, to be a burgess of Gloucester. Bell and his wife Joan had donated as an endowment for the Hospital the site of Whitefriars Monastery, Morin's Mill in Brook Street, six houses, and the rent of another house, having a total annual value of £16-0s-4d. This was intended to finance quarterly payments of 13s 4d to each of the almspersons. By 1598 the trustees had dwindled in number to only two, one of whom was Denys, having been negligent in making reappointments, and they sought and were granted licence to convey the trust assets to the ownership and management of the Mayor and Burgesses of Gloucester. The assets were so transferred five years later in 1603, by which time Denys was the sole surviving trustee.

=== Evolution of The Kimbrose under City Corporation Ownership ===
About 1800, part of the lands of the Kimbrose Hospital were sold by the City Corporation "for redemption of land tax", together with the "Uses Lands". The City Corporation by then owned and managed 4 ancient hospitals, St Margaret's, St Mary Magdalene, St Bartholomew and St Kyneburg's (the Kimbrose). The Kimbrose almshouses were demolished in 1862, yet the Kimbrose nevertheless retained its identity until 1896 when the first Charity Commission Scheme came into effect and the 4 Gloucester Hospitals were merged into a holding entity called the United Hospitals, governed as one entity under the direction of eighteen trustees under the new title "Gloucester Municipal Charities". In 1990 the entity changed its name again to "Gloucester Charities Trust", the headquarters of which is still based on the site of St Margaret's, one of the 4 original hospitals. Shortly thereafter a new day centre for the modern almspersons, now known as residents in sheltered housing, was built near St Margaret's and named "The Kimbrose Day Centre". While not therefore on its original site, it nevertheless memorialises the hospital established by Sir Thomas Bell the Elder. Kimbrose Way in today's Gloucester, to the SE of Blackfriars, memorialises the original ancient site, but no trace of the almshouses remains.

=== Benefactions under 1562 Trust Deed ===
Bell's trust deed gave annual rent charges totalling £6 10s for the poor of the 4 city wards and for the prisoners in the county and city gaols. This element of the charity was taken over by the City Corporation in 1603, but the payments continued to be made until 1825. The trust also allowed to the corporation the annual sum of £4 for the repair of the Bristol road beyond the city boundary, as far as the Sud brook, presumably aimed to help the city traders.

== Other Benefactions ==
Bell Snr. gave £10 to St Mary de Crypt, Gloucester, for the poor. The principal sum was invested with the City Corporation, the revenue being distributed within the parish in bread. Bell had acquired the house of the anchoress of St Aldate's, in the churchyard, and donated it, before 1563, to that church to fund repairs. The building was later used by the smiths' company for its hall. A document entitled Memorandum of the charitable and other memorable deeds done by Sir Thomas Bell, knight is held within the Gloucestershire Archives (GBR/G/5/1. f.58)

== Death and Burial ==
Sir Thomas Bell the Elder died in 1566, his wife Lady Bell the following year. They had no children. They were both buried in St Mary de Crypt Church, Gloucester, where their tombchest is situated in a tomb recess in the south chapel. Two kneeling figures from this tomb were moved to the crypt c. 1840, and have now been lost. Bell is memorialized in Gloucester by the Bell Inn near Southgate St., and by Bell Lane, Lady Bell by Ladybellegate Street.

== Silver Plate ==
Bell's donation in 1563 of a silver cup was the founding gift establishing Gloucester Corporation's collection of plate. A silver gilt roundel dated 1563 bearing the arms of Bell were displayed at Gloucester Guildhall until 1986. It was part of a set of three given to the Corporation in 1906. A silver seal 2½" in diameter, was made in 1565 for St Bartholomew's Hospital from a cup given to the Corporation by Bell. It depicted St Bartholomew holding the symbols of his martyrdom. Bell redeemed plate pawned by the Dominican friars of the city.

== Portrait of Bell the Elder ==
A portrait of Sir Thomas Bell the Elder exists within the collection of Gloucester City Museum & Art Gallery, the property of the City Council, measuring 31" by 29". It appears to be one of a set depicting mayors of Gloucester, similar in composition to those of John Falkener and John Cooke. He is shown wearing a short-sleeved long scarlet mayoral robe, edged with fur, holding a pair of gloves in his right hand. He wears a ruff-necked black garment under his robe, with a thin gold chain of 5 strands around his neck. A ring is worn on his left thumb. In the top left corner are depicted his armourials with crest and below the legend:"Thomas Bell, Knight. 3 times mayor of the Cittie of Gloster". In the top right corner is the legend: "He did wel for the poore provide. His righteousness shal still remaine and his estate with praise abide surpassing gold & worldly gayne". Ironically he is not shown wearing a cap, from which valuable information might have been gathered as to the product type of his manufactory.

== Heraldry ==
The Arms of Bell: Argent, on a chevron between three Hawks' bells gules 2 bars gemelles argent, on a chief gules a hawk's lure argent stringed or between two martlets argent. The Crest is: An Arm embowed vested gules cuffed or supporting in the hand proper a battleaxe the shaft gules head argent. These arms, blazoned above from the entry in the 1623 Visitation of Gloucestershire, are depicted in the portrait of Bell the Elder in the possession of Gloucester City Council, although the martlets (house-marten birds) appear more substantial than that bird's usual heraldic slim silhouette, possibly denoting hawks. Sydney Grazebrook in his Heraldry states that this grant, with martlets, was made to "Thomas Bell of Gloucester, gentleman" in 1542, and that it resembled the arms of Bell of Bromsgrove, Worcs., which had escallops in place of hawks' bells and hawks in place of martlets. Bell was knighted in 1547, that is five years after this grant of arms.

== Sir Thomas Bell the Younger ==
Thomas Bell Jnr. was twice Mayor of Gloucester, in 1543 and 1554/5. During his last term, together with the city aldermen, Bell visited Bishop John Hooper of Gloucester on the evening before the bishop's martyrdom on 9 Feb. 1555. Hooper thanked them for their visit and later Bell chased away people trying to record Hooper's last words at the stake. He is mentioned in Foxe's Book of Martyrs.

Thomas Bell Jnr. married Sibill and had issue:

1. William Bell, married Anne Heyward of Sandhurst, Glos., and had numerous issue. The last entry in the Sandhurst Parish Register for Bell is Francis Bell, 1794.
2. Jane (or Joan) Bell married Thomas Denys of Gloucester, a younger son of Sir Walter Denys(d.1571) of Dyrham Park, and Siston Court, Glos. Thomas Denys became the heir of Sir Thomas Bell the Elder, his wife's uncle, and thereby became for a while the main landlord in Gloucester. The Bell inheritance was largely destroyed during the Civil War when the properties, mainly situated on the outskirts of the city, were destroyed by bombardment. Denys's aunt Margaret Denys married Sir Nicholas Arnold, Thomas Cromwell's assistant in the Dissolution of the Monasteries. His father had obtained part of St Augustine's Abbey, Bristol. Bell's niece Anne married Sir Ferdinando Gorges, a Somerset man.

== Secondary sources ==
- This article is largely based on Victoria County History, vol.4, Gloucester.
- Visitation of Gloucester, (1623), Denys; Bindoff S.T. (ed.) History of House of Commons 1509–1558, London, 1982. Vol.2, pp. 36–37, Sir Walter Denys.
- Heraldry of Worcestershire (1873) pp. 43–44
- Kymbrose Hospital Trust foundation deed: Glos. Archives D3269/5 (Transcript in F.S. Hockaday's Abstracts of Glos. Records, p. 223); copy foundation deed: GBR/J/1/1706A(copy imperfect)
- Thomas Rudge, The History & Antiquities of Gloucester.
- The Itinerary of John Leland in or about the Years 1535–1543. (ed.) Toulmin Smith, L. London, 1908. Vol.2, p. 58.
- 'Death of Sir Thomas Bell the Younger 1560/1': GDR Wills 1561/120. Per VCH Glos.
