= Karalina =

Karalina is a given name. It is a version of Caroline and a variant of Carolina.

- Karalina Savenka (born 1998), Belarusian cyclist
- Johanna Maria Karalina [Lina] Karsten birthname of Mary Caroline Bisley (1836-1917), German settler of New Zealand

== See also ==
- Karolina (given name)
