= Maurice Berkeley, 1st Baron FitzHardinge =

Royal Navy Admiral (1788–1867)

Admiral The Right Honourable The Lord FitzHardinge GCB PC DL
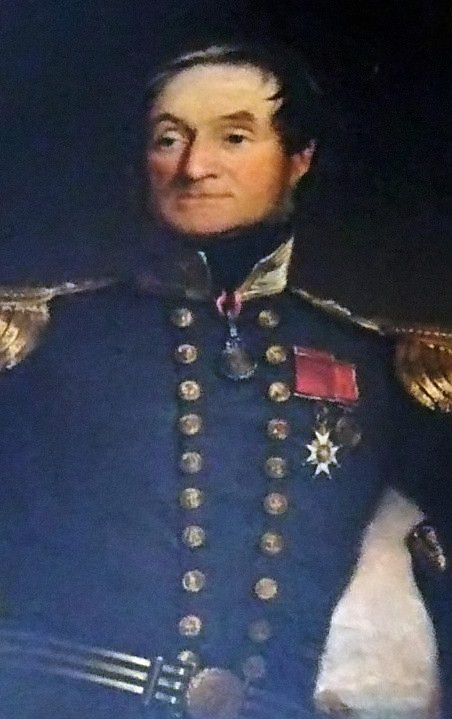
- Admiral Lord FitzHardinge
- Born: 3 January 1788
- Died: 17 October 1867 (aged 79); Berkeley Castle, Gloucestershire
- Military career
- Allegiance: United Kingdom
- Branch: Royal Navy
- Service years: 1802–1862
- Rank: Admiral
- Commands: HMS Semiramis; HMS Thunderer
- Conflicts: Peninsular War; Oriental Crisis
- Awards: Knight Grand Cross of the Order of the Bath
- Other work: Member of Parliament; Privy Council

Admiral Maurice Frederick FitzHardinge Berkeley, 1st Baron FitzHardinge, GCB, PC, DL (3 January 1788 – 17 October 1867) was a Royal Navy officer. As a junior officer he commanded gunboats on the Tagus, reinforcing the Lines of Torres Vedras, in Autumn 1810 during the Peninsular War and, as a captain, he served on the coast of Syria taking part in the capture of Acre in November 1840 during the Oriental Crisis. He also served as Whig Member of Parliament for Gloucester and became First Naval Lord in the Aberdeen ministry in June 1854 and in that role focussed on manning the fleet and in carrying out reforms and improvements in the food, clothing, and pay of seamen.

== Early career ==
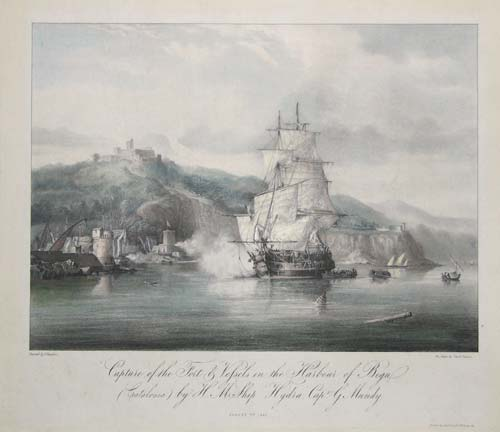
The fifth-rate HMS Hydra in which Berkeley served as a junior officer

Born the illegitimate son of Frederick Berkeley, 5th Earl of Berkeley, and his wife Mary Berkeley (née Cole), Berkeley entered the Royal Navy in June 1802. Promoted to lieutenant on 9 July 1808, he joined the fifth-rate HMS Hydra on the east coast of Spain and then commanded gunboats on the Tagus, reinforcing the Lines of Torres Vedras, in Autumn 1810 during the Peninsular War. Promoted to commander on 19 December 1810, he was given command of the sixth-rate HMS Vestal. After being promoted to captain on 7 June 1814 and, having become a Deputy Lieutenant of Sussex on 18 June 1824, he took command of the fifth-rate HMS Semiramis, flagship of the Commander-in-Chief, Cork in May 1828.

Entering politics, Berkeley became Whig Member of Parliament for Gloucester in the 1831 general election. He resigned his seat in April 1833 following his appointment as Fourth Naval Lord in the Grey ministry that month and remained in office until December 1834. He successfully became Member of Parliament for Gloucester again at the 1835 general election but, although he secured his old job as Fourth Naval Lord back again in the Second Melbourne ministry in July 1837, he was defeated at the 1837 general election. He remained in office as Fourth Sea Lord but became concerned over reductions in manning and resigned in March 1839.

Returning to sea, Berkeley was given command of the second-rate HMS Thunderer in January 1840 and served on the coast of Syria taking part in the capture of Acre in November 1840 during the Oriental Crisis. For this he was appointed a Companion of the Order of the Bath and received the Naval Gold Medal.

At the 1841 general election Berkeley returned to Parliament as Member for Gloucester again and, while still serving in Parliament, he became the Third Naval Lord in the First Russell ministry in July 1846. He was also appointed a Naval Aide-de-Camp to the Queen on 17 November 1846.

== Senior command ==
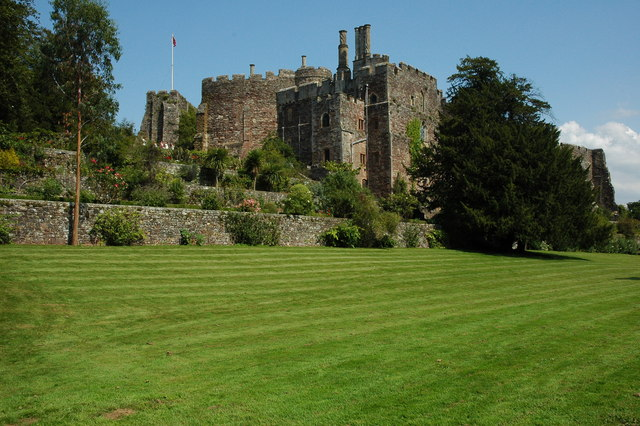
Berkeley Castle, home of the Berkeley family, where Lord FitzHardinge died

Berkeley went on to be Second Naval Lord in the same ministry in December 1847 and, having been promoted to the rank of rear-admiral on 30 October 1849, he briefly became First Naval Lord in the same ministry in February 1852 but left office when the Government fell from power the following month. He became Second Naval Lord in the Aberdeen ministry in January 1853 and First Naval Lord in the same ministry in June 1854. As First Naval Lord he focussed on manning the fleet and in carrying out reforms and improvements in the food, clothing, and pay of seamen. Having been advanced to Knight Commander of the Order of the Bath on 5 July 1855, become a member of the Privy Council on 13 August 1855 and been promoted to vice-admiral on 21 October 1856, he lost his seat in Parliament at the 1857 general election and resigned as First Naval Lord suffering from ill health in November 1857.

On 26 February 1861, after inheriting his brother's estates, Berkeley unsuccessfully claimed the Barony of Berkeley as being one by tenure of Berkeley Castle. He was advanced to Knight Grand Cross of the Order of the Bath on 28 June 1861 and was created Baron FitzHardinge, of the city and county of Bristol on 3 August 1861. He was promoted to full admiral on 15 January 1862 and died at Berkeley Castle in Gloucestershire on 17 October 1867.

== Family ==
In 1823 Berkeley married Lady Charlotte Lennox, daughter of Charles Lennox, 4th Duke of Richmond; after his first wife died he married Lady Charlotte Moreton, daughter of Thomas Reynolds-Moreton, 1st Earl of Ducie in 1834.

== Sources ==
- Dod, Robert P. (1860). The Peerage, Baronetage and Knightage of Great Britain and Ireland. London: Whitaker and Co. ISBN 978-1146417068.
- Maurice Frederick Fitzhardinge Berkeley R.N., pdavis.nl. Accessed 22 February 2024.

Parliament of the United Kingdom
Preceded by John Philpotts; Edward Webb	Member of Parliament for Gloucester; 1831–1833; With: Edward Webb 1831–1832; John Philpotts 1832–1833	Succeeded by John Philpotts; Henry Thomas Hope
Preceded by John Philpotts; Henry Thomas Hope	Member of Parliament for Gloucester; 1835–1837; With: Henry Thomas Hope	Succeeded by John Philpotts; Henry Thomas Hope
Preceded by John Philpotts; Henry Thomas Hope	Member of Parliament for Gloucester; 1841–1857; With: John Philpotts 1841–1847; Henry Thomas Hope 1847–1852; William Philip Price 1852–1857	Succeeded by Sir Robert Carden; William Philip Price
Military offices
Preceded by George Barrington	Fourth Naval Lord; 1833–1835	Succeeded by Sir Edward Troubridge
Preceded by Sir Edward Troubridge	Fourth Naval Lord; 1837–1839	Succeeded by Sir Samuel Pechell
Preceded by Sir William Bowles	Third Naval Lord; 1846–1847	Succeeded by Lord John Hay
Preceded by Sir Henry Prescott	Second Naval Lord; December 1847 – February 1852	Succeeded by Sir Houston Stewart
Preceded by Sir James Dundas	First Naval Lord; February 1852 – March 1852	Succeeded by Hyde Parker
Preceded by Sir Phipps Hornby	Second Naval Lord; January 1853— June 1854	Succeeded by Sir Richard Dundas
Preceded by Hyde Parker	First Naval Lord; June 1854 – November 1857	Succeeded by Sir Richard Dundas
Peerage of the United Kingdom
New creation	Baron FitzHardinge; 1861–1867	Succeeded by Francis Berkeley
