= Pope Bob =

Pope Bob may refer to:

- Pope Leo XIV (born 1955), born Robert Francis Prevost, known as "Bob" among friends and family
- Robert Anton Wilson (1932-2007), American writer and agnostic mystic, called "Pope Bob" by the Church of the SubGenius and the Discordians
- Robert G. Ingersoll (1833-1899), American orator who campaigned in favor of agnosticism, ironically called "Pope Bob"

== See also ==
- Robert Pope
