= John Butte (MP for Gloucester) =

14th-century English politician

John Butte (fl. 1366), was an English politician.

He was a member (MP) of the parliament of England for Gloucester in 1366.

Parliament of England
Preceded by William Heyberer; John de Monmouth	Member of Parliament for Gloucester; 1366; With: John Elemore	Succeeded by Thomas Steward; William le Veltare
