= Dalby =

Dalby may refer to:

== Places and jurisdictions ==
=== Australia ===
- Dalby, Queensland
  - Borough of Dalby, a local government area for Dalby
  - Town of Dalby, a local government area for Dalby

=== British Isles ===
- Dalby, Isle of Man
- Dalby, Lincolnshire
- Great Dalby, Leicestershire
- Old Dalby, Leicestershire
- Dalby Preceptory, Leicestershire
- Dalby-cum-Skewsby, North Yorkshire
- Dalby Forest, North York Moors National Park

=== Denmark ===
- Dalby, Faxe Municipality

=== Sweden ===
- Dalby, Lund Municipality
  - Diocese of Dalby, a predecessor to the Diocese of Lund

=== United States ===
- Dalby, Iowa
- Dalby Springs, Texas

== Other uses ==
- Dalby (surname), a surname (including a list of people with the name)

== See also ==
- Delby (disambiguation)
