= Richard de Brythampton =

Member of Parliament for Gloucester
- In office 1298–1302
- Preceded by: Henry le Chaunger
- Succeeded by: John le Bole

Richard de Brythampton was an English politician who served as the member of Parliament for Gloucester in the Parliament of 1298.
