= Henry de Chounger =

Member of Parliament for Gloucester
- In office 1295–1298
- Preceded by: Constituency Established
- Succeeded by: Richard de Brythampton

Henry de Chounger (or Henry le Chaunger) was an English politician who served as the member of Parliament for Gloucester in the Parliament of 1295.
