= John le Bury =

English politician

Member of Parliament for Gloucester
- In office 1315–1318
- Preceded by: Walter le Spicer
- Succeeded by: Walter le Spicer

John le Bury was the member of Parliament for Gloucester in the 14th English Parliament of 1315. The monarch at the time was Edward II.
