= William de Hertford =

Member of Parliament for Gloucester
- In office 1305–1306
- Preceded by: John de Bale
- Succeeded by: Richard le Clerk
- In office 1309 – August 1311
- Preceded by: Andrew de Penedok
- Succeeded by: Walter le Spicer
- In office March 1313 – September 1313
- Preceded by: Walter le Spicer
- Succeeded by: Walter le Spicer

William de Hertford was an English politician who served as the member of Parliament for Gloucester in three separate parliaments during the early 1300s.

== See also ==
- John de Hertford
