= Simon Broke =

English politician

Simon Broke (fl. 1393–1406) of Gloucester, was an English Member of Parliament (MP). He was a Member of the Parliament of England for Gloucester in 1393, 1399, 1402 and 1406.
