= Thomas Pope (MP for Gloucester) =

English politician

Thomas Pope (died 1400), from Gloucester, was an English Member of Parliament (MP).

== Family ==
He married a woman named Lettice, and they had one son. His second wife was named Margery.

== Career ==
He was a Member of the Parliament of England for Gloucester in 1393 and January 1397.
