= John de Norwich =

English Member of Parliament

John de Norwich (or Northwick) was the member of Parliament for Gloucester in the Parliament of 1309.
