= Richard le Blehston =

Richard le Blehston was the member of Parliament for Gloucester in the Parliament of 1306.
