= 1873 Gloucester by-election =

UK Parliamentary by-election

The 1873 Gloucester by-election was fought on 8 May 1873. The by-election was fought due to the Resignation of the incumbent MP of the Liberal Party, William Philip Price. It was won by the Conservative candidate William Killigrew Wait.
