= Roger de Heyberare =

Roger de Heyberare (or Roger le Heberer) was the member of Parliament for Gloucester in the Parliament of 1295.
