= Thomas de Hannely =

Parliament for Gloucester member

Thomas de Hannely was the member of Parliament for Gloucester in the Parliament of 1307.
