= Walter le Spicer =

Member of Parliament for Gloucester
- In office August 1311 – November 1311
- Preceded by: William de Hertford
- Succeeded by: William de Hertford
- In office September 1313 – 1315
- Preceded by: William de Hertford
- Succeeded by: John le Bury
- In office 1318–1319
- Preceded by: John de Bury
- Succeeded by: John de Hereford
- In office May 1322 – November 1322
- Preceded by: William de Russell
- Succeeded by: Richard Kyst
- In office April 1328 – March 1332
- Preceded by: Elias de Aylberton
- Succeeded by: William de Tyderynton
- In office December 1332 – February 1334
- Preceded by: William de Tyderynton
- Succeeded by: Robert de Goldhull
- In office 1335 – March 1336
- Preceded by: Walter Wawepol
- Succeeded by: John de Walsh
- In office September 1336 – January 1337
- Preceded by: William de Tyderynton
- Succeeded by: John de Couele

Walter le Spicer was an English politician who served as the member of Parliament for Gloucester at various points throughout the 1310s, 20s, and 1330s.
