= John King (MP for Gloucester) =

Member of Parliament for Gloucester in 1311 and 1313

John King was the member of Parliament for Gloucester in the Parliament of 1311 and both the parliaments of 1313.
