= Stephen de Maismore =

English politician

Stephen de Maismore (or Maismor) was the member of Parliament for Gloucester in the Parliament of 1318.
