= Richard Baret =

14th-century English politician

Richard Baret (died 1401), of Eastgate Street, Gloucester, was an English politician.

He was a member (MP) of the parliament of England for Gloucester in January 1377, 1378, January 1397, September 1397 and 1399.
