= Richard Birde (MP for Gloucester) =

English politician

Richard Birde (died 1613) of Whitminster, Gloucestershire, was an English bureaucrat and landowner.

His origins are unknown. He was described as 'Richard Byrde or Beard of Wheatenhurst(Whitminster)' of a property in westgate Street, Gloucester in 1570.

He was town clerk of Gloucester from 1579 to 1595. By 1591 he held the manor-house of Wheatenhurst, two mills and 81 acres of demesne lands.

He was an MP for Gloucester in 1593; before he was elected, he promised to renounce his wages as town clerk.

He died at the beginning of 1613, survived by his wife Margaret (d. 1621). His estate was inherited by his grandson Thomas Lloyd (d. 1658), son of his daughter Sibyl.
