= John Phillpotts (MP) =

English politician (1775–1849)

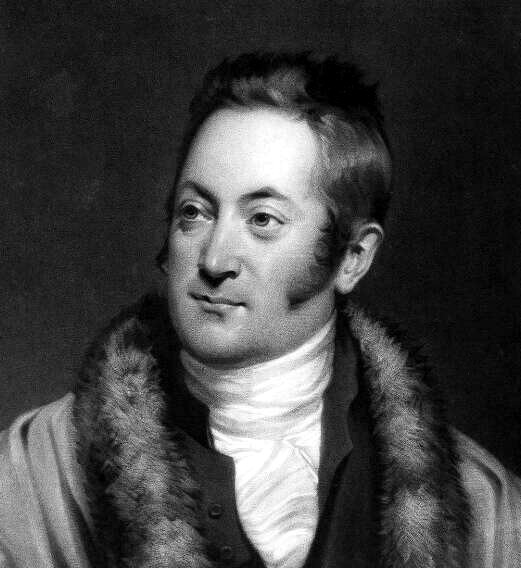
- Portrait of John Phillpotts, sometime Mayor of Gloucester and MP for Gloucester city, 1840
- Born: 1775; Bridgwater, Somerset
- Died: 1849 (aged 73–74); London

John Phillpotts (1775–1849), of Spa Villa and Bear Land, Gloucester and Porthgwidden, Cornwall, was a nineteenth-century English politician.

== Life ==
John Phillpotts was the eldest son of John Phillpotts (1743–1814), a Herefordshire landowner, businessman and sometime Land Agent to the Dean and Chapter of Gloucester Cathedral, and his wife Sibella Glover (1753–1833); he was the elder brother of Henry Phillpotts, Bishop of Exeter.

John Phillpotts was born at Bridgwater in Somerset while his father was operating a brick and tile factory in that town.

John Phillpotts practised as an attorney in Gloucester and held the post of Registrar to the Dean and Chapter of the cathedral. He was Mayor of Gloucester for one term (1819–20). He dined at the Inner Temple and was called to the bar in 1822, after which he served as a magistrate at the Gloucester sessions and on the Oxford circuit.

Phillpotts gained a reputation for severity and was known in some quarters as "Cat-o-Nine-Tails Jack". Flogging was his favoured cure for vagrancy and begging.

John Phillpotts was elected a Member of Parliament (MP) for Gloucester in three parliaments (1830–1831, 1832–1834, and 1837–1847). In the 1841 election he topped the poll with 753 votes, being trailed by Captain Maurice Berkeley (732 votes) and Viscount Loftus (510 votes). John Phillpotts retired from politics in 1847.

In his politics Phillpotts aligned himself variously with the Whigs and the Tories, earning himself the sobriquet of “the Gloucester Weathercock”, but he was consistent in representing the interests of Gloucester city. Amongst other achievements he backed the Gloucester and Sharpness Canal project, helped develop the infrastructure of Gloucester city and was instrumental in saving a local bank from ruin.

In 1797 John Phillpotts married Sarah, daughter of Thomas Chandler of Ashcroft House, Ozleworth, near Wotton under Edge in Gloucestershire. The couple had one son, Thomas Phillpotts (1807–1890), who was to become Canon of Truro under John Phillpotts' brother Henry Phillpotts the Bishop of Exeter. John and Sarah Phillpotts were later estranged.

Two years after retiring from politics, in June 1849, John Phillpotts died of a heart attack while on board an omnibus in the West End of London. Sarah Phillpotts died in Gloucester one month later.

== Gallery ==
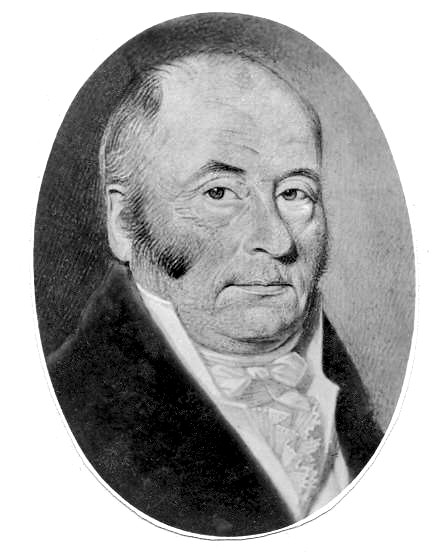
John Phillpotts senior, father of John Phillpotts MP

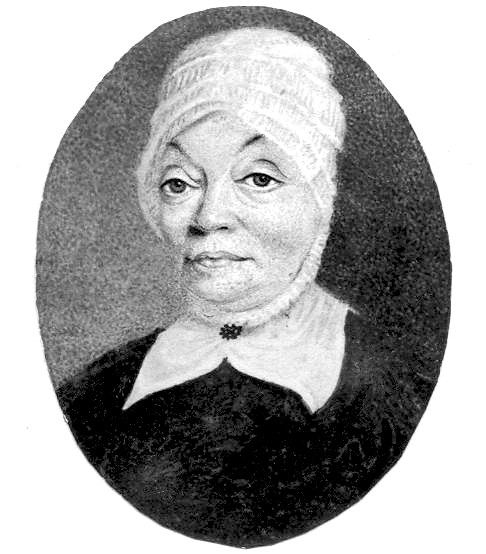
Sibella Phillpotts, mother of John Phillpotts MP

Parliament of the United Kingdom
Preceded by Robert Bransby Cooper; Edward Webb	Member of Parliament for Gloucester; 1830–1831; With: Edward Webb	Succeeded by Edward Webb; Maurice Berkeley
Preceded by Edward Webb; Maurice Berkeley	Member of Parliament for Gloucester; 1832–1835; With: Maurice Berkeley; Henry Thomas Hope	Succeeded by Maurice Berkeley; Henry Thomas Hope
Preceded by Maurice Berkeley; Henry Thomas Hope	Member of Parliament for Gloucester; 1837–1847; With: Henry Thomas Hope; Maurice Berkeley	Succeeded by Henry Thomas Hope; Maurice Berkeley
