= Thomas de Gloucester =

Thomas de Gloucester was the member of Parliament for Gloucester in the Parliament of 1335.
