= John de Bale =

Member of the Parliament of England

Member of Parliament for Gloucester
- In office 1302–1305
- Preceded by: Richard de Brythampton
- Succeeded by: William de Hertford

John de Bale was an English politician who served as the member of Parliament for Gloucester in the Parliament of 1302.
