= Stephen Pope (MP) =

English politician

Stephen Pope (fl. 1388), of Gloucester, was an English Member of Parliament (MP). He was a Member of the Parliament of England for Gloucester in September 1388.
