= 1957 Gloucester by-election =

UK Parliamentary by-election

The 1957 Gloucester by-election was held on 12 September 1957. It was held due to the death of the incumbent Labour MP, Moss Turner-Samuels. The by-election was won by the Labour candidate Jack Diamond.

Gloucester by-election, 1957 Electorate
Party	Candidate	Votes	%	±%
Labour	John Diamond	18,895	51.33	+0.44
Conservative	F.J.V.H Dashwood	10,521	28.58	−20.53
Liberal	Patrick Herbert Lort-Phillips	7,393	20.08	New
Majority		8,374	22.75	+20.97
Turnout		36,809	71.0	−9.9
Labour hold		Swing	+10.5	
