= Henry Thomas Hope =

British politician and patron of the arts (1808–1862)

- Born: 30 April 1808; London, England
- Died: 4 December 1862 (aged 54); London, England
- Spouse: Anne Adele Hope (m. 1851)
- Children: 1
- Father: Thomas Hope
- Relatives: Alexander Beresford Hope (brother); Henry Pelham-Clinton, 6th Duke of Newcastle (son-in-law); Henry Philip Hope (uncle); John Beresford, 2nd Baron Decies (uncle); Marcus Beresford (uncle); William Beresford, 1st Viscount Beresford (step-father and cousin); Francis Pelham-Clinton-Hope, 8th Duke of Newcastle (grandson); Henry Pelham-Clinton, 7th Duke of Newcastle (grandson); William Beresford, 1st Baron Decies (grandfather); Jan Hope (grandfather)
- Family: Hope family

Henry Thomas Hope (30 April 1808 – 4 December 1862) was a British politician and patron of the arts.

== Early life and family ==
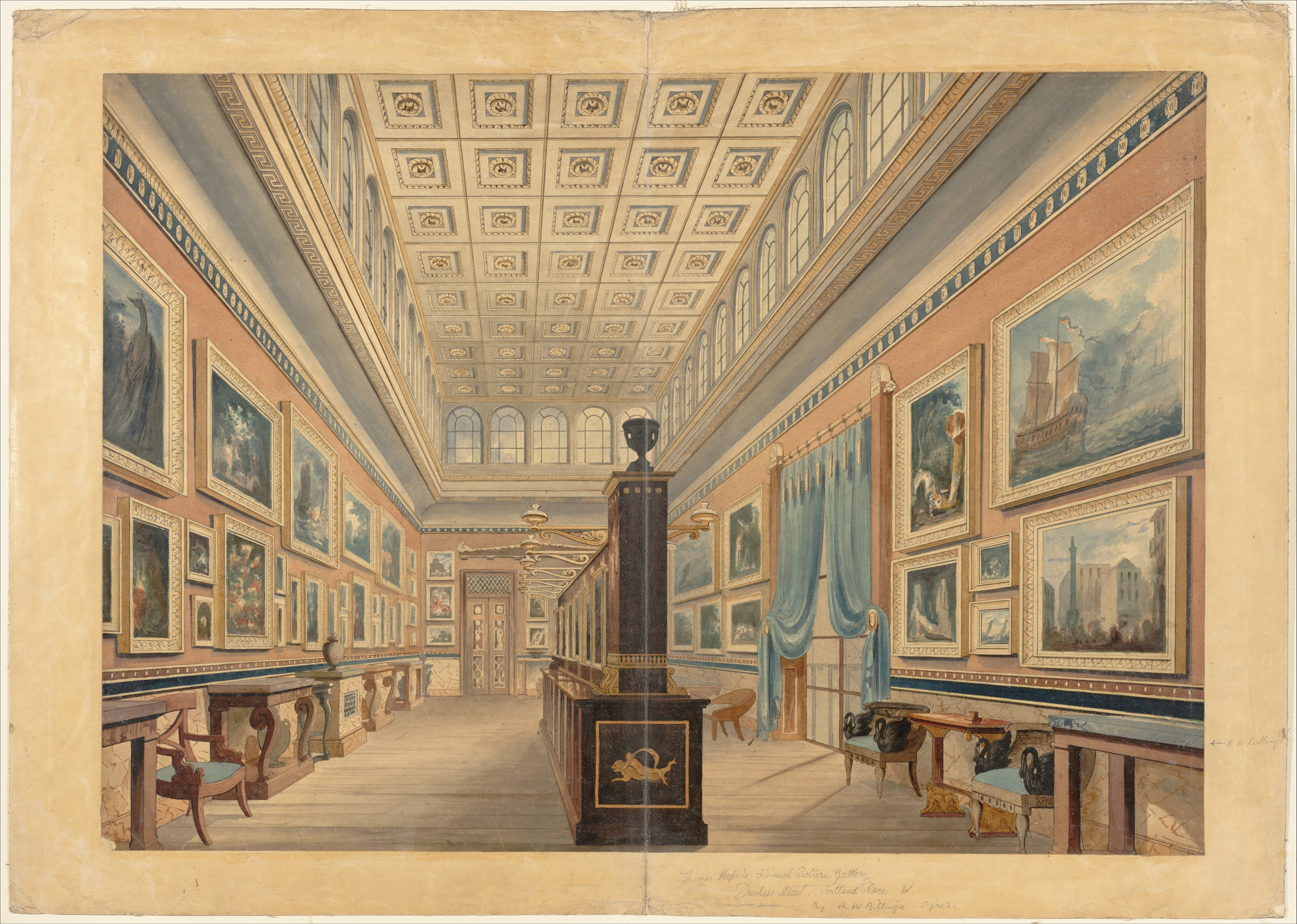
The Flemish Picture Gallery, Henry Thomas Hope's home Duchess Street, by R.W. Billings

Hope was born 30 April 1808 in London to a Dutch father of Scottish descent and an Anglo-Irish mother. His father, Thomas Hope, was an art collector and his mother, Louisa de la Poer Hope (née Beresford, later Viscountess Beresford; died 1851), was a society hostess.

A member of the Hope family of merchant bankers, he was the paternal grandson of the banker Jan Hope and the nephew of the art and gem collector Henry Philip Hope. Hope was also the maternal grandson of the Church of Ireland clergyman William Beresford, 1st Baron Decies , and the nephew of the clergyman John Beresford, 2nd Baron Decies and the soldier and politician Marcus Beresford. One of at least five siblings, he was the elder brother of the politician and author Alexander Hope (later Beresford Hope).

Inheriting the wealth, properties, and art collections of his father in 1831, and of that of his uncle Henry Philip Hope in 1839, Hope became bitterly estranged from his three brothers. Hope's inheritance from this uncle included the Hope Diamond. The year following his father's death, Hope's mother married her cousin William Beresford, 1st Viscount Beresford.

== Career ==
He entered a political career after studying at Eton College and Trinity College, Cambridge (1825–29). He was briefly a Groom of the Bedchamber to Kings George IV and William IV between March and November 1830.

He also founded the Art Union of London and the Royal Botanic Society, as well as serving as vice-president of the Society of Arts and president of the Surrey Archaeological Society. Displaying his old masters collection to the public at his London house on Duchess Street, a mansion at 116 Piccadilly and at Deepdene House in Surrey. He was also a patron to idealists such as Young England and the Spanish Carlists and helped organise the 1851 Great Exhibition. From 1851 to 1858 he chaired the Eastern Steam Navigation Company for Isambard Kingdom Brunel, with Henry having been the Great Eastern's chief fundraiser.

In 1844 he was elected a member of the Royal Yacht Squadron, sailing the schooner Zephyretta.

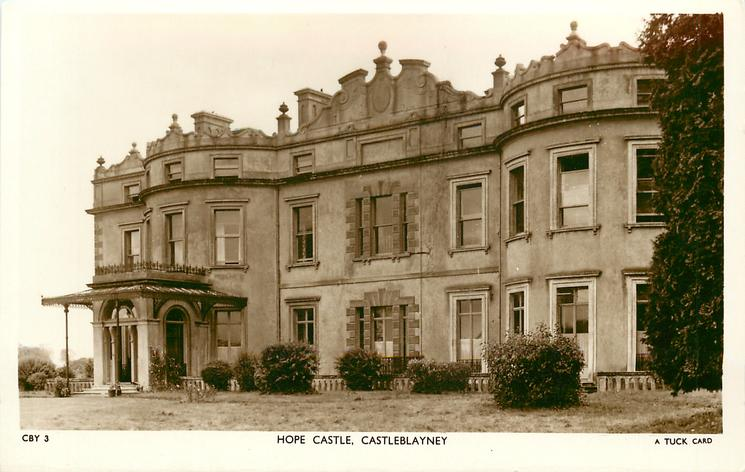
Hope Castle, Castleblayney

In 1853, he purchased Blayney Castle in Castleblayney, County Monaghan, Ireland, from the 12th Baron Blayney. He renamed the country house as Hope Castle.

== Personal life ==
In 1851 Hope married Anne Adele Bichat, having already had a daughter named Henrietta Adela with her in 1843. The marriage legitimised Henrietta, who in 1861 married Lord Lincoln (later sixth Duke of Newcastle). After her first husband's death, Henrietta married Thomas Theobald Hohler.

Hope died on 4 December 1862 at 116 Piccadilly, London.

== Constituencies ==
- East Looe, 1829–32
- Gloucester, stood unsuccessfully in December 1832
- Marylebone, stood unsuccessfully in March 1833
- Gloucester, 1833–52

Parliament of the United Kingdom
Preceded by James Buller-Elphinstone; William Lascelles	Member of Parliament for East Looe; 1829–1832; With: William Lascelles to 1830; Thomas Arthur Kemmis from 1830	constituency abolished
Preceded by Maurice Berkeley; John Phillpotts	Member of Parliament for Gloucester; 1833–1841; With: John Phillpotts to 1835; Maurice Berkeley 1835–37; John Phillpotts from 1837	Succeeded by John Phillpotts; Maurice Berkeley
Preceded by John Phillpotts; Maurice Berkeley	Member of Parliament for Gloucester; 1847–1852; With: Maurice Berkeley	Succeeded by Maurice Berkeley; William Philip Price
