= William Croke (English politician) =

William Croke (died c. 1401), of Gloucester, was an English Member of Parliament (MP).

He was a Member of the Parliament of England for Gloucester in 1369, 1385, 1386 and 1395.

His wife's name was Maud, with whom he had a son, Thomas. He is buried in St Peter's Abbey.

Croke held the office of bailiff for eight terms during his career. His profession was as a lawyer, and he was appointed seven times by the sheriffs of Gloucestershire to present accounts to the Exchequer. He also acted as a feoffee for Sir Nicholas Berkeley of Dursley's widow.
