= John Lucas (MP for Gloucester) =

Member of Parliament in August 1311

John Lucas was the member of Parliament for Gloucester in the Parliament of August 1311.
