= Richard Dalby (disambiguation) =

Richard Dalby (1949–2017) was an English editor and literary researcher.

Richard or Ric(k) Dalby may also refer to:

- Richard Dalby (MP) (died before 1455), English Member of Parliament
- Rick Dalby (fl. 2000s), nominee for Hollywood Post Alliance Award for Outstanding Color Grading – Television
- Ric Dalby, fictional character from Home and Away

== See also ==
- Richard Dalby Morkill, mayor of Sherbrooke, Quebec
