= Thomas More (died 1421) =

English politician

Thomas More (died 1421) of Gloucester was an English Member of Parliament (MP).

He was a Member of the Parliament of England for Gloucester in November 1414, 1415 and 1420.
