= John Pope (fl. 1384–1397) =

English politician

John Pope (fl. 1384–1397), from Gloucester, was an English Member of Parliament (MP). He was a Member of the Parliament of England for Gloucester in November 1384, 1386, September 1388 and September 1397.
