= William Birdlip =

English politician

William Birdlip (fl. 1402–1417) of Gloucester, was an English Member of Parliament (MP).

He was a Member of the Parliament of England for Gloucester in 1402, 1411 and 1417.
