= Robert Pope =

Robert Pope may refer to:

- Rob Pope, American musician
- Robert Pope (priest) (1916–2002), Anglican clergyman
- Robert Pope (MP) for Gloucester
- Robert J. Pope (1865–1949), New Zealand poet, songwriter and teacher
- Robert Pope (runner) (born 1977), British distance runner

== See also ==
- Pope Bob (disambiguation)
