= Robert Gilbert (MP for Gloucester) =

English politician

Robert Gilbert (fl. 1415–1432) was an English Member of Parliament (MP).

He was a Member of the Parliament of England for Gloucester from 1415 to 1432.
