= Robert Cole (MP) =

English politician (1478–1536/50)

Robert Cole (by 1478–1536/1550), was an English politician.

He was a member (MP) of the parliament of England for Gloucester in 1512.
