= Thomas Stevens (MP for Gloucester) =

English politician

Thomas Stevens (fl. 1420–1442), of Gloucester and London, was an English Member of Parliament (MP).

He was a Member of the Parliament of England for Gloucester from 1420 to 1442.
