= Thomas Copperich =

Thomas Copperich (or Coperych) was the member of Parliament for Gloucester in the Parliament of 1315.
