= Richard le Clerk =

British Member of Parliament

Member of Parliament for Gloucester
- In office 1306–1307
- Preceded by: William de Hertford
- Succeeded by: Andrew de Penedok

Richard le Clerk was an English politician who served as the member of Parliament for Gloucester in the Parliament of 1306.
