= William Killigrew Wait =

British politician and merchant

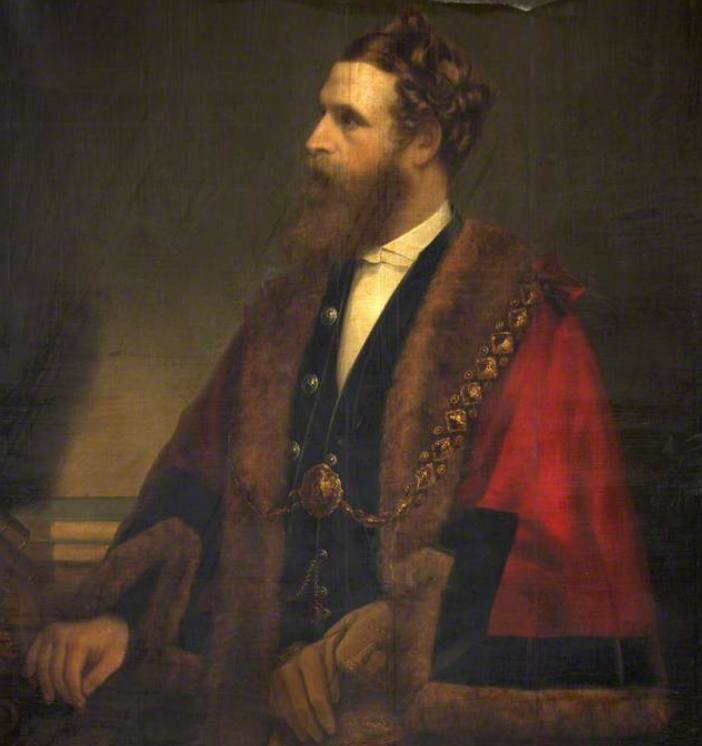
William Killigrew Wait as Mayor of Bristol, oil on canvas, 1869.

William Killigrew Wait (26 December 1826 – 13 December 1902) was a British politician and merchant in Bristol.

Wait was born in 1826, the son of W. K. Wait, an Alderman and Sheriff of Bristol. He was educated at Bristol College and worked as a grain merchant. He first became a town councillor at the age of 41 in 1867, and was appointed Mayor of Bristol in 1869. He became an Alderman in the city in 1886 but resigned in 1891. He was prominent in the movement which led to the building of a nave at the Cathedral in Bristol, and active in local causes throughout his life.

Wait was the Conservative Party member of Parliament for Gloucester elected in the 1873 Gloucester by-election. His opponent was Thomas Robinson of the Liberal Party who was subsequently elected in 1880. The 1873 by-election was marred by accusations of corruption but an enquiry by the Electoral Commission upheld Wait's victory.

Wait was converted to the cause of women's suffrage by the forced resignation of Eliza Walker Dunbar from the Bristol Royal Hospital for Children.

He married a daughter of John Perrin. His daughter Frances Katharine Wait married Charles Chadwyck-Healey on 17 May 1884.

Wait died at his residence St Vincent´s Hall, Clifton, on 13 December 1902.
