= John Bisley (fl. 1406–1421) =

English politician

John Bisley (fl. 1406–1421) was an English politician.

He was a member (MP) of the parliament of England for Gloucester between 1406 and 1421.
