= Gloucester (constituency) =

Parliamentary constituency in the United Kingdom, 1885 onwards

Coordinates: 51.867°N 2.249°W

- Borough constituency for the House of Commons
- Interactive map of boundaries from 2024
- Boundary of Gloucester in South West England
- County: Gloucestershire
- Electorate: 76,695 (2023)

Current constituency
- Created: 1885
- Member of Parliament: Alex McIntyre (Labour)
- Seats: One

1295–1885
- Seats: Two
- Type of constituency: Borough constituency

Gloucester (/ˈɡlɒstər/ GLOST-ər) is a constituency (Note: A borough constituency (for the purposes of election expenses and type of returning officer)) centred on the cathedral city and county town of the same name, represented in the House of Commons of the UK by Alex McIntyre of the Labour Party.

== Constituency profile ==
The Gloucester constituency is located in Gloucestershire and covers most of the city of Gloucester, excluding some eastern and northern suburbs. Gloucester is a historic cathedral city which was founded in the Roman era. The city has a history of aerospace manufacturing as the site of the Gloster Aircraft Company. The constituency has average levels of deprivation, with some deprived areas in the city centre and in Barton and Tredworth, and some affluent suburbs like Abbeydale and Abbeymead, Hucclecote and Quedgeley. The average house price is low compared to the rest of the country.

In general, residents are young and have low levels of education and professional employment. Household incomes are similar to the national average. White people made up 84% of the population at the 2021 census, a similar proportion to the country as a whole. Political representation in the city is mixed; at the city council, the city centre and Hucclecote elected Liberal Democrats, other suburbs elected Conservatives, and Labour Party councillors were elected in the more deprived areas east of the city centre. At the county council, which held elections more recently, the city's southern suburbs elected Reform UK representatives. An estimated 59% of voters in the constituency supported leaving the European Union in the 2016 referendum, higher than the nationwide figure of 52%.

== History ==
A borough of Gloucester was established by 1295 that returned two burgesses as Members of Parliament to the House of Commons. Its population meant this was a situation not leading to an outright rotten borough identified for abolition under the Reform Act 1832 however on more fair (far more equal representation) national changes in 1885, representation was reduced to one member under the Redistribution of Seats Act 1885.

Since 1979 Gloucester has been a bellwether constituency by passing between representatives of the two largest parties in the same way as the government. After nearly three decades as a Conservative seat, it was held by Labour from 1997 to 2010 before returning to a Conservative on a swing of 8.9%. Labour recaptured the seat once again at the 2024 general election.

== Boundaries ==
1918–1950: The County Borough of Gloucester.

1950–1955: The County Borough of Gloucester, and in the Rural District of Gloucester the parishes of Barnwood, Brockworth, Hempsted, Hucclecote, and Wotton Vill.

1955–1974: The County Borough of Gloucester, and in the Rural District of Gloucester the parishes of Barnwood, Brockworth, Hempsted, and Hucclecote.

Wotton Vill parish had been absorbed by Gloucester CB in 1951. The constituency boundaries remained unchanged.

1974–1983: The County Borough of Gloucester.

1983–1997: The City of Gloucester, and the District of Stroud wards of Quedgeley and Hardwicke, and Upton St Leonards.

1997–2010: The City of Gloucester.

2010–2024: The City of Gloucester wards of Abbey, Barnwood, Barton and Tredworth, Elmbridge, Grange, Hucclecote, Kingsholm and Wotton, Matson and Robinswood, Moreland, Podsmead, Quedgeley Fieldcourt, Quedgeley Severn Vale, Tuffley, and Westgate.

The Longlevens ward was transferred to Tewkesbury.

2024–present: As above minus Elmbridge ward.

Reduced to bring the electorate within the permitted range by transferring the Elmbridge ward to the Tewkesbury constituency.

== Members of Parliament ==
=== MPs 1295–1640 ===
Parliament	1st member	2nd member
Parliament of 1295	Henry le Chaunger	Roger le Heberer
Parliament of 1298	Richard de Brythampton	Robert le Especer
Parliament of 1302	John le Bole	Robert le Especer
Parliament of 1305	William de Hertford	John de Combe
Parliament of 1306	Richard le Clerk	Richard le Blekstere
Parliament of 1307	Andrew de Penedok	Thomas de Hauneley
Parliament of 1309	William de Hertford	John de Northwick
Parliament of Aug 1311	Walter le Spicer	John Lucas
Parliament of Nov 1311	Walter le Spicer	John King
Parliament of Mar 1313	William de Hertford	John King
Parliament of Sep 1313	Walter le Spicer	John King
Parliament of 1315	John le Bury	Thomas Coperych
Parliament of 1318	Walter le Spicer	Stephen de Maismore
Parliament of 1319	John de Hereford	Andrew de Penedok
Parliament of 1320	Andrew Pendok	John de Brugge (Bridge)
Parliament of 1321	Andrew de Pendok	William de Russell
Parliament of May 1322	Andrew de Pendok	Walter le Spicer
Parliament of Nov 1322	John de Hereford	Richard Kyst
Parliament of Jan 1324	Andrew de Pendok	Richard de Bradenestok
Parliament of 1325	Andrew de Penedok	John de Coueleye
Parliament of 1326	Andrew de Penedok	John de Coueleye
Parliament of 1327	John Brayton	John in the Field
Parliament of Feb 1328	Elias de Aylberton	John de Coggeshale
Parliament of Apr 1328	Walter le Spicer	John de Brockworth
Parliament of Mar 1330	Walter le Spicer	Richard le Fysshere
Parliament of Nov 1330	Walter le Spicer	Edmund de Baverton
Parliament of Mar 1332	Walter le Spicer	William de Hereford
Parliament of Sep 1332	William de Tyderynton	William de Hereford
Parliament of Dec 1332	Walter le Spicer	William de Coubrugg (Cowbridge)
Parliament of Feb 1334	Robert de Goldhull	Walter Wawepol
Parliament of 1335	Thomas de Gloucester	Walter le Spicer
Parliament of Mar 1336	William de Tyderynton	John de Walsh
Parliament of Sep 1336	Walter le Spicer	William de Coubrugg
Parliament of Jan 1337	John de Couele	Robert Laurence
Parliament of Feb 1338	John de Coueleye	Hugh de Aylbrighton
Parliament of Jul 1338	Andrew de Penedok	John de Gloucester
Parliament of Jan 1339	Hugh de Aylbrighton	John (?)
Parliament of Jan 1340	William de Knygeshaw	Roger de Kyngesloue
Parliament of Mar 1340	William de Kyngeshaw	Roger de Kyngesloue
Parliament of 1341	William de Kyngeshaw	Robert le Walour
Parliament of 1344	John de Wynston	Robert de Staverton
Parliament of 1346	Adam de Hope	Hugh de Aylbrighton
Parliament of Jan. 1348	Nicholas Buyrsy	John Wynston
Parliament of Mar. 1348	William Brown	John Wynston
Parliament of Feb. 1351	John Coles	John Hoorn
Parliament of 1353	Robert Brown	William de Norfolk
Parliament of 1355	Nicholas Crikkelade	Thomas Okynton
Parliament of 1358	Robert Waler	Robert Brown
Parliament of 1360	Thomas de Stoke	Thomas Steward
Parliament of 1361	John de Haselton	William de Heyberare
Parliament of 1362	William Heyberer	Hugh le Parkere
Parliament of 1365	William Heyberer	John de Monmouth
Parliament of 1366	John Butte	John Elemore
Parliament of 1368	Thomas Steward	William le Veltare
Parliament of 1369	William Croke	Thomas Steward
Parliament of Feb 1371	William Heyberer	John de Compton
Parliament of Jun 1371	William Heyberer	(One Member only returned)
Parliament of 1372	William Heyberer	Thomas Styward
Parliament of 1373	William Heyberer	Thomas Styward
Parliament of 1376	Edward Taverner	Robert Pope
Parliament of Jan 1377	John Anlep	Richard Baret
Parliament of Oct 1377	William Heyberare	John Dulep
Parliament of Jan 1380	William Heyberer	William Wightfield
Parliament of Oct 1382	John Haseltone	John Biseley
Parliament of Feb 1383	John Haselton	John Biseley
Parliament of Oct 1383	John Biseley	William Baret
Parliament of Apr 1384	John Head	Robert Pope
Parliament of Nov 1384	John Compton	John Pope jnr
Parliament of 1385	William Croke	Robert Sweynesey
Parliament of 1386	William Croke	John Pope
Parliament of Feb 1388	John Head	Robert Pope
Parliament of Sept 1388	John Pope	Stephen Pope
Parliament of Jan 1390	William Heyberer	John Banbury
Parliament of 1391	Richard Asshewell	John Bisley
Parliament of 1393	Thomas Pope	Simon Broke
Parliament of 1395	Roger Ball	William Croke
Parliament of 1397	John Pope	Richard Baret
Parliament of Sept 1397	John Pope	Richard Baret
Parliament of 1399	Richard Baret	Simon Broke
Parliament of 1402	John Bisley	Simon Broke
Parliament of 1406	Simon Broke	William Birdlip
Parliament of Sep 1407	John Bisley	Roger Ball
Parliament of Oct 1411	John Bisley	William Birdlip
Parliament for May 1413	John Streyneshan	John Clopton
Parliament for Nov 1414	Thomas Byseley snr	Thomas More
Parliament of Oct 1415	Robert Gilbert	Thomas More
Parliament of Oct 1417	William Birdlip	John Bisley
Parliament of Sep 1419	John Bisley	Robert Gilbert
Parliament of Nov 1420	Thomas More	Thomas Stevens
Parliament of Apr 1421	John Biseley snr	Robert Gilbert
Parliament of Nov 1421	Robert Gilbert	Richard Dalby
Parliament of Oct 1422	Robert Gilbert	Thomas Stevens
Parliament of Oct 1432	John Streynsham	Thomas Stevens
Parliament for Apr 1425	John Streynsham	Thomas Stevens
Parliament for Jan 1426	Thomas Hewes	John Bysley jnr
Parliament for Sept 1427	Robert Gilbert	Thomas Stevens
Parliament for Dec 1430	John Hamelyn	Thomas Stevens
Parliament for Apr 1432	Robert Gilbert	Thomas Stevens
Parliament for Jun 1433	John Hamelyn	Thomas Derehurst
Parliament for July 1435	Thomas Hewes	Richard Dalby
Parliament for Dec 1436	Thomas Derhurst	John Andrewe
Parliament for Jan 1442	Thomas Stevens	William Olyver
Parliament for Jan 1447	Thomas Derehurst	Walter Chaunterell
Parliament for 1449	Thomas Derehurste	John Andreaux
Parliament for Oct 1449	William Notyngham	Henry Dode
Parliament for Oct 1450	John Andreaux	Thomas Bokeland
Parliament for Feb 1453	Robert Bentham	William Eldesfeld
Parliament for Feb 1453	Robert Bentham	William Eldesfeld
Parliament for July 1455	John Andreaux	John Dodying
Parliament for Sep 1460	Nicholas Hert	William Brockwood
Parliament for May 1467	John Hylley	John Trye
Parliament for Sep 1472	John Trye	Alexander Cely
Parliament for Jan 1478	John Farley	Alexander Cely
Parliament of 1485–86	Thomas Limrick	
Parliament of 1491	Walter Ronde or Rende	William Marmion
Parliament of 1512	William Goldsmith alias Smith	Robert Cole
Parliament of 1515	John Pakington	Thomas Porter
Parliament of 1529	John Rawlins	Adam Appwell
Parliament of 1545	Richard Morgan	(Sir) Thomas Bell
Parliament of Sep 1547	Sir Thomas Bell	Richard Morgan
Parliament of Jan 1553	Sir Thomas Bell	Richard Morgan
Parliament of Sep 1553	Thomas Payne	Thomas Loveday
Parliament of Mar 1554	Thomas Payne	Thomas Loveday
Parliament of Oct 1554	Sir Thomas Bell	William Massinger
Parliament of 1555	Arthur Porter	William Massinger
Parliament of 1558	Richard Pates	Thomas Payne
Parliament of 1559	Richard Pates	Sir Nicholas Arnold
Parliament of 1563–1567	Richard Pates	Sir Nicholas Arnold
Parliament of 1571	Thomas Atkins	William Massinger
Parliament of 1572–1583	Thomas Atkins	Thomas Semys
Parliament of 1584–1585	Thomas Atkins	Luke Garnons
Parliament of 1586–1587	Thomas Atkins	Richard Pates
Parliament of 1588–1589	Thomas Atkins	Luke Garnons
Parliament of 1593	Thomas Atkins	Richard Birde
Parliament of 1597–1598	William Oldsworth	Luke Garnons
Parliament of 1601	William Oldsworth	Luke Garnons
Parliament of 1604–1611	Nicholas Overbury	John Jones
Addled Parliament (1614)	Thomas Machen	John Browne
Parliament of 1621–1622	Anthony Robinson	John Browne
Happy Parliament (1624–1625)	Anthony Robinson	John Browne
Useless Parliament (1625)	Christopher Caple	John Browne
Parliament of 1625–1626	Christopher Caple	John Browne
Parliament of 1628–1629	John Hanbury	John Browne
No Parliament summoned 1629–1640

=== MPs 1640–1885 ===
Year	First member	First party	Second member	Second party
April 1640	William Singleton		Henry Brett	
November 1640	Thomas Pury, senior	Parliamentarian	Henry Brett	Royalist
February 1644	Thomas Pury, senior	Parliamentarian	Brett disabled from sitting – seat vacant	
1645	Thomas Pury, senior	Parliamentarian	John Lenthall	
1653	Gloucester was unrepresented in the Barebones Parliament			
1654	Thomas Pury, senior		William Lenthall	
1656	Thomas Pury, senior		James Stephens	
January 1659	Laurence Singleton		James Stephens	
May 1659	Thomas Pury, senior		John Lenthall	
April 1660	Sir Edward Massey		James Stephens	
1661	Sir Edward Massey		Evan Seys	
1675	Henry Norwood		Evan Seys	
February 1679	William Cooke		Evan Seys	
September 1679	Sir Charles Berkeley		Evan Seys	
1681	Sir Charles Berkeley		Lord Herbert	
1685	John Wagstaffe		John Powell	
1689	Sir Duncombe Colchester		William Cooke	
1690	William Trye		William Cooke	
1695	William Trye		Robert Payne	
1698	Sir William Rich		William Selwyn	
January 1701	John Bridgeman		William Selwyn	
December 1701	Viscount Dursley		John Hanbury	
July 1702	John Grobham Howe		William Trye	
December 1702	John Hanbury		William Trye	
1705	John Hanbury		William Cooke	
1708	Thomas Webb		William Cooke	
1709	Thomas Webb		Francis Wyndham	
1710	Thomas Webb		John Blanch	
1713	John Snell		Charles Coxe	
1722	John Snell		Charles Hyett	
February 1727	John Howe		Charles Hyett	
September 1727	Benjamin Bathurst		Charles Selwyn	
1734	Benjamin Bathurst		John Selwyn	
1751	Benjamin Bathurst		(Sir) Charles Barrow	Tory
1754	George Augustus Selwyn	Whig	(Sir) Charles Barrow	Tory
1761	George Augustus Selwyn	Whig	(Sir) Charles Barrow	Whig
1780	John Webb	Whig	(Sir) Charles Barrow	Whig
1789	John Webb	Whig	John Pitt	Tory
1795	Henry Thomas Howard	Whig	John Pitt	Tory
1805	Henry Thomas Howard	Whig	Robert Morris	Whig
1816	Henry Thomas Howard	Whig	Edward Webb	Whig
1818	Robert Bransby Cooper	Tory	Edward Webb	Whig
1830	John Phillpotts	Whig	Edward Webb	Whig
1831	Maurice Berkeley	Whig	Edward Webb	Whig
1832	Maurice Berkeley	Whig	John Phillpotts	Whig
1833	Henry Hope	Tory	John Phillpotts	Whig
1834	Henry Hope	Conservative	John Phillpotts	Whig
1835	Henry Hope	Conservative	Maurice Berkeley	Whig
1837	Henry Hope	Conservative	John Phillpotts	Whig
1841	Maurice Berkeley	Whig	John Phillpotts	Whig
1847	Maurice Berkeley	Whig	Henry Hope	Conservative
1852	Maurice Berkeley	Whig	William Philip Price	Radical
1857	Sir Robert Carden	Conservative	William Philip Price	Radical
1859	Charles James Monk	Liberal	William Philip Price	Liberal
1862	Hon. Charles Berkeley	Liberal	John Joseph Powell	Liberal
1865	Charles James Monk	Liberal	William Philip Price	Liberal
1873	Charles James Monk	Liberal	William Killigrew Wait	Conservative
1880	Charles James Monk	Liberal	Thomas Robinson	Liberal
1881	Charles James Monk	Liberal	Writ suspended: seat vacant	
1885	Representation reduced to one Member			

In 1881, Robinson's willingness to stand down faced with a popular petition and the unwillingness of the Conservatives to make allegations nor investigate matters further led to suspicions of collusion between the parties and a Royal Commission was set up to examine electoral practices. The Royal Commission concluded that Gloucester was among the most corrupt of the seven towns investigated and that bribery was endemic in all elections in the city. The Commission concluded that half of the electorate had taken bribes in 1880 and blamed local politicians for most of the corruption. Despite these findings and virtually halving the electorate eligible to vote Robinson was reelected for Gloucester in 1885 when representation had been reduced to one member under the Redistribution of Seats Act 1885.

=== MPs since 1885 ===
Election	Member	Party
1885	Thomas Robinson	Liberal
1895	Charles James Monk	Liberal Unionist
1900	Russell Rea	Liberal
Jan 1910	Henry Terrell	Conservative
1918	Sir James Bruton	Conservative
1923	James Horlick	Conservative
1929	Leslie Boyce	Conservative
1945	Moss Turner-Samuels	Labour
1957 by-election	Jack Diamond	Labour
1970	Sally Oppenheim	Conservative
1987	Douglas French	Conservative
1997	Tess Kingham	Labour
2001	Parmjit Dhanda	Labour
2010	Richard Graham	Conservative
2024	Alex McIntyre	Labour

== Elections ==
=== Elections in the 2020s ===
General election 2024: Gloucester
Party	Candidate	Votes	%	±%
Labour	Alex McIntyre	16,472	36.1	+0.9
Conservative	Richard Graham	13,041	28.5	–26.1
Reform	Christopher Farmer	7,307	16.0	N/A
Liberal Democrats	Rebecca Trimnell	4,759	10.4	+2.7
Green	Adam Shearing	2,307	5.0	+2.5
Workers Party	Steve Gower	974	2.1	N/A
Socialist Labour	Akhlaque Ahmed	496	1.1	N/A
Independent	Fred Ramsey	336	0.7	N/A
Majority		3,431	7.6	N/A
Turnout		45,692	57.5	–9.1
Registered electors		79,479		
Labour gain from Conservative		Swing	▲13.5	

=== Elections in the 2010s ===
2019 notional result
Party	Vote	%
Conservative	27,887	54.6
Labour	18,007	35.2
Liberal Democrats	3,920	7.7
Green	1,279	2.5
Turnout	51,093	66.6
Electorate	76,695	

General election 2019: Gloucester
Party	Candidate	Votes	%	±%
Conservative	Richard Graham	29,159	54.2	+3.9
Labour Co-op	Fran Boait	18,882	35.1	–5.0
Liberal Democrats	Rebecca Trimnell	4,338	8.1	+3.1
Green	Michael Byfield	1,385	2.6	+1.2
Majority		10,277	19.1	+8.9
Turnout		53,764	66.1	+0.9
Registered electors		81,332		–1.97
Conservative hold		Swing	+4.5	

Note: The Brexit Party were due to field Richard Ford as a candidate, but the nomination was withdrawn.

General election 2017:Gloucester
Party	Candidate	Votes	%	±%
Conservative	Richard Graham	27,208	50.3	+5.0
Labour	Barry Kirby	21,688	40.1	+8.5
Liberal Democrats	Jeremy Hilton	2,716	5.0	–0.4
UKIP	Daniel Woolf	1,495	2.8	–11.5
Green	Gerald Hartley	754	1.4	–1.4
Monster Raving Loony	George Ridgeon	210	0.4	–0.1
Majority		5,520	10.2	–3.5
Turnout		54,071	65.2	+1.8
Registered electors		82,963		0.0
Conservative hold		Swing	–1.8	

General election 2015: Gloucester
Party	Candidate	Votes	%	±%
Conservative	Richard Graham	23,837	45.3	+5.4
Labour	Sophy Gardner	16,586	31.6	–3.6
UKIP	Richard Ford	7,497	14.3	+10.7
Liberal Democrats	Jeremy Hilton	2,828	5.4	–13.8
Green	Jonathan Ingleby	1,485	2.8	+1.8
Monster Raving Loony	George Ridgeon	277	0.5	N/A
TUSC	Sue Powell	58	0.1	N/A
Majority		7,251	13.7	+9.0
Turnout		52,568	63.4	–0.6
Registered electors		82,949		+4.6
Conservative hold		Swing	+4.5	

General election 2010: Gloucester
Party	Candidate	Votes	%	±%
Conservative	Richard Graham	20,267	39.9	+5.3
Labour	Parmjit Dhanda	17,847	35.2	−12.4
Liberal Democrats	Jeremy Hilton	9,767	19.2	+5.6
UKIP	Mike Smith	1,808	3.6	+1.2
English Democrat	Alan Platt	564	1.1	N/A
Green	Bryan Meloy	511	1.0	−0.7
Majority		2,420	4.7	N/A
Turnout		50,764	64.0	+1.5
Registered electors		79,322		0.0
Conservative gain from Labour		Swing	+8.9	

=== Elections in the 2000s ===
General election 2005: Gloucester
Party	Candidate	Votes	%	±%
Labour	Parmjit Dhanda	23,138	44.7	−1.1
Conservative	Paul James	18,867	36.4	−1.3
Liberal Democrats	Jeremy Hilton	7,825	15.1	+0.8
UKIP	Gary Phipps	1,116	2.2	+0.5
Green	Bryan Meloy	857	1.7	New
Majority		4,271	8.3	+0.2
Turnout		51,803	62.8	+3.4
Registered electors		82,500		+1.7
Labour hold		Swing	+0.1	

General election 2001: Gloucester
Party	Candidate	Votes	%	±%
Labour	Parmjit Dhanda	22,067	45.8	−4.2
Conservative	Paul James	18,187	37.7	+2.0
Liberal Democrats	Tim Bullamore	6,875	14.3	+3.8
UKIP	Terry Lines	822	1.7	+0.9
Socialist Alliance	Stewart Smyth	272	0.6	N/A
Majority		3,880	8.1	−6.2
Turnout		48,223	59.4	−14.2
Registered electors		81,144		+3.1
Labour hold		Swing	−3.1	

=== Elections in the 1990s ===
General election 1997: Gloucester
Party	Candidate	Votes	%	±%
Labour	Tess Kingham	28,943	50.0	+13.2
Conservative	Douglas French	20,684	35.7	−9.8
Liberal Democrats	Peter Munisamy	6,069	10.5	−7.2
Referendum	Andrew Reid	1,482	2.6	N/A
UKIP	A. L. Harris	455	0.8	N/A
Natural Law	Moira Hamilton	281	0.5	N/A
Majority		8,259	14.3	+5.6
Turnout		57,914	73.6	−7.6
Registered electors		78,682		+2.9
Labour gain from Conservative		Swing	+11.5	

1992 notional result
Party	Vote	%
Conservative	28,274	45.5
Labour	22,867	36.8
Liberal Democrats	10,961	17.6
Turnout	62,102	81.2
Electorate	76,487	

General election 1992: Gloucester
Party	Candidate	Votes	%	±%
Conservative	Douglas French	29,870	46.2	−3.5
Labour	Kevin E. Stephens	23,801	36.8	+7.2
Liberal Democrats	John M. Sewell	10,978	17.0	−3.7
Majority		6,069	9.4	−10.7
Turnout		64,649	80.2	+2.1
Registered electors		80,578		+4.8
Conservative hold		Swing	−5.3	

=== Elections in the 1980s ===
General election 1987: Gloucester
Party	Candidate	Votes	%	±%
Conservative	Douglas French	29,826	49.7	−1.2
Labour	David Hulme	17,791	29.6	+3.4
Liberal	Jeremy Hilton	12,417	20.7	−3.3
Majority		12,035	20.1	−2.2
Turnout		60,034	78.1	+2.5
Registered electors		76,910		+3.6
Conservative hold		Swing	−1.1	

General election 1983: Gloucester
Party	Candidate	Votes	%	±%
Conservative	Sally Oppenheim	27,235	48.5	−0.3
Labour	Charles W. V. Hinds	14,698	26.2	−9.8
SDP	Michael D. Golder	13,499	24.0	+9.7
Ecology	J. Waters	479	0.9	N/A
BNP	Richard Rhodes	260	0.5	N/A
Majority		12,537	22.3	+9.5
Turnout		56,171	75.6	−4.5
Registered electors		74,268		+9.1
Conservative hold		Swing	+4.8	

=== Elections in the 1970s ===
General election 1979: Gloucester
Party	Candidate	Votes	%	±%
Conservative	Sally Oppenheim	25,163	48.7	+2.6
Labour	Michael Golder	18,747	36.3	−2.6
Liberal	D. G. Halford	7,213	14.0	−1.0
National Front	R. Morgan	527	1.0	N/A
Majority		6,416	12.4	+5.2
Turnout		51,650	79.5	+0.8
Registered electors		64,958		+4.0
Conservative hold		Swing	+2.6	

General election October 1974: Gloucester
Party	Candidate	Votes	%	±%
Conservative	Sally Oppenheim	22,664	46.1	+1.6
Labour	Ann Clwyd	19,136	38.9	+3.7
Liberal	D. G. Halford	7,357	15.0	−4.6
Majority		3,528	7.2	−2.1
Turnout		49,157	78.7	−5.0
Registered electors		62,486		+0.9
Conservative hold		Swing	−1.1	

General election February 1974: Gloucester
Party	Candidate	Votes	%	±%
Conservative	Sally Oppenheim	23,052	44.5	−2.2
Labour	A. E. Pegler	18,215	35.2	−9.6
Liberal	D. G. Halford	10,155	19.6	+11.0
Powell Conservative	Bryan Gordon-Storkey	366	0.7	N/A
Majority		4,837	9.3	+7.4
Turnout		51,788	83.7	+7.8
Registered electors		61,910		+0.6
Conservative hold		Swing	+3.7	

General election 1970: Gloucester
Party	Candidate	Votes	%	±%
Conservative	Sally Oppenheim	21,838	46.9	+10.6
Labour	Jack Diamond	20,777	44.6	−3.9
Liberal	James P. Heppell	3,935	8.5	−6.6
Majority		1,061	2.3	−9.9
Turnout		46,550	76.1	−1.4
Registered electors		61,164		+9.8
Conservative gain from Labour		Swing	+7.2	

=== Elections in the 1960s ===
General election 1966: Gloucester
Party	Candidate	Votes	%	±%
Labour	Jack Diamond	20,951	48.5	+3.0
Conservative	Christopher J. J. Balfour	15,678	36.3	+0.3
Liberal	Inga-Stina Robson	6,540	15.1	−2.5
Majority		5,273	12.2	+2.7
Turnout		43,169	77.5	−1.0
Registered electors		55,703		+1.5
Labour hold		Swing	+1.3	

General election 1964: Gloucester
Party	Candidate	Votes	%	±%
Labour	Jack Diamond	19,631	45.5	+0.8
Conservative	John Stokes	15,514	36.0	−2.4
Liberal	Inga-Stina Robson	7,581	17.6	+0.7
Independent	Russell Eckley	380	0.9	N/A
Majority		4,117	9.5	+3.2
Turnout		43,106	78.5	−3.8
Registered electors		54,905		+3.9
Labour hold		Swing	+1.6	

=== Elections in the 1950s ===
General election 1959: Gloucester
Party	Candidate	Votes	%	±%
Labour	Jack Diamond	19,450	44.7	−6.2
Conservative	H. D. Keith Scott	16,679	38.4	−10.7
Liberal	Patrick Herbert Lort-Phillips	7,336	16.9	N/A
Majority		2,771	6.3	+4.5
Turnout		43,465	82.3	+1.4
Registered electors		52,836		+2.0
Labour hold		Swing	−8.2	

1957 Gloucester by-election
Party	Candidate	Votes	%	±%
Labour	Jack Diamond	18,895	51.3	+0.4
Conservative	F. J. V. H. Dashwood	10,521	28.6	−20.5
Liberal	Patrick Herbert Lort-Phillips	7,393	20.1	N/A
Majority		8,374	22.7	+20.9
Turnout		36,809	71.0	−9.9
Registered electors		51,815		−0.1
Labour hold		Swing	+10.5	

General election 1955: Gloucester
Party	Candidate	Votes	%	±%
Labour	Moss Turner-Samuels	21,354	50.9	+2.1
Conservative	David Napley	20,606	49.1	+5.5
Majority		748	1.8	−3.4
Turnout		41,960	80.9	−4.6
Registered electors		51,841		+2.5
Labour hold		Swing	−1.7	

General election 1951: Gloucester
Party	Candidate	Votes	%	±%
Labour	Moss Turner-Samuels	21,097	48.8	+1.1
Conservative	Anthony Kershaw	18,836	43.6	+6.5
Liberal	Gordon E Payne	3,292	7.6	−7.6
Majority		2,261	5.2	−5.4
Turnout		43,225	85.5	−0.9
Registered electors		50,554		+3.2
Labour hold		Swing	−2.7	

General election 1950: Gloucester
Party	Candidate	Votes	%	±%
Labour	Moss Turner-Samuels	20,202	47.7	
National Liberal	Anthony Kershaw	15,708	37.1	
Liberal	Harold Arthur Guy	6,444	15.2	
Majority		4,494	10.6	
Turnout		42,354	86.4	
Registered electors		49,005		
Labour hold				

=== Election in the 1940s ===
General election 1945: Gloucester
Party	Candidate	Votes	%	±%
Labour	Moss Turner-Samuels	14,010	47.0	+4.1
Conservative	Leslie Boyce	10,466	35.1	−22.0
Liberal	Harold Arthur Guy	5,338	17.9	N/A
Majority		3,544	11.9	N/A
Turnout		29,814	74.8	−4.2
Registered electors		39,884		+14.7
Labour gain from Conservative		Swing	+13.0	

=== Elections in the 1930s ===
General election 1935: Gloucester
Party	Candidate	Votes	%	±%
Conservative	Leslie Boyce	15,682	57.1	−10.5
Labour	Moss Turner-Samuels	11,803	42.9	+10.5
Majority		3,879	14.2	−21.0
Turnout		27,485	79.0	−3.5
Registered electors		34,786		+0.9
Conservative hold		Swing	−10.5	

General election 1931: Gloucester
Party	Candidate	Votes	%	±%
Conservative	Leslie Boyce	19,201	67.6	+28.4
Labour	Charles Fox	9,223	32.4	−5.0
Majority		9,978	35.2	+33.4
Turnout		28424	82.5	−1.1
Registered electors		34,473		+2.2
Conservative hold		Swing	+16.7	

=== Elections in the 1920s ===
General election 1929: Gloucester
Party	Candidate	Votes	%	±%
Unionist	Leslie Boyce	11,041	39.2	−8.6
Labour	Henry Nixon	10,548	37.4	+1.2
Liberal	Thomas Worrall Casey	6,589	23.4	+7.3
Majority		493	1.8	−9.6
Turnout		28,178	83.6	+0.5
Registered electors		33,716		+26.8
Unionist hold		Swing	−4.8	

General election 1924: Gloucester
Party	Candidate	Votes	%	±%
Unionist	James Horlick	10,525	47.6	+9.7
Labour	M. Philips Price	8,005	36.2	+0.5
Liberal	Theobald Mathew	3,566	16.1	−10.3
Majority		2,520	11.4	+9.2
Turnout		22,096	83.1	−3.4
Registered electors		26,600		+1.0
Unionist hold		Swing	+4.6	

General election 1923: Gloucester
Party	Candidate	Votes	%	±%
Unionist	James Horlick	8,630	37.9	+1.6
Labour	M. Philips Price	8,127	35.7	−0.3
Liberal	Arthur Stanton	6,011	26.4	−1.3
Majority		503	2.2	+1.9
Turnout		22,768	86.5	+1.8
Registered electors		26,324		+2.1
Unionist hold		Swing	+1.0	

General election 1922: Gloucester
Party	Candidate	Votes	%	±%
Unionist	James Bruton	7,922	36.3	−14.8
Labour	M. Philips Price	7,871	36.0	+18.7
Liberal	Arthur Stanton	6,050	27.7	−3.9
Majority		51	0.3	−19.2
Turnout		21,843	84.7	+18.4
Registered electors		25,784		+3.1
Unionist hold		Swing	−16.8	

=== Elections in the 1910s ===
General election 1918: Gloucester
Party		Candidate	Votes	%	±%
C	Unionist	James Bruton	8,470	51.1	
	Liberal	Thomas Henry Mordey	5,246	31.6	
	Labour	William Levason Edwards	2,860	17.3	N/A
Majority			3,224	19.5	
Turnout			16,576	66.3	
Registered electors			25,006		
	Unionist hold				
C indicates candidate endorsed by the coalition government.

General election December 1910: Gloucester
Party	Candidate	Votes	%	±%
Conservative	Henry Terrell	3,903	50.0	−0.8
Liberal	H. F. B. Lynch	3,899	50.0	+0.8
Majority		4	0.0	−1.6
Turnout		7,802	92.1	−3.4
Registered electors		8,475		0.0
Conservative hold		Swing	−0.8	

General election January 1910: Gloucester
Party	Candidate	Votes	%	±%
Conservative	Henry Terrell	4,109	50.8	+2.8
Liberal	Russell Rea	3,983	49.2	−2.8
Majority		126	1.6	−2.4
Turnout		8,092	95.5	+1.8
Registered electors		8,475		0.0
Conservative hold		Swing	+2.8	

=== Elections in the 1900s ===
General election 1906: Gloucester
Party	Candidate	Votes	%	±%
Liberal	Russell Rea	3,921	52.0	+0.2
Conservative	Henry Terrell	3,619	48.0	−0.2
Majority		302	4.0	+0.4
Turnout		7,540	93.7	+9.5
Registered electors		8,043		+7.3
Liberal hold				

General election 1900: Gloucester
Party	Candidate	Votes	%	±%
Liberal	Russell Rea	3,267	51.8	+5.7
Liberal Unionist	Pandeli Ralli	3,044	48.2	−5.7
Majority		223	3.6	−4.2
Turnout		6,311	84.2	−3.6
Registered electors		7,496		+8.6
Liberal gain from Liberal Unionist		Swing	+5.7	

=== Elections in the 1890s ===
General election 1895: Gloucester
Party	Candidate	Votes	%	±%
Liberal Unionist	Charles James Monk	3,264	53.9	+4.6
Liberal	Arthur Wells	2,791	46.1	−4.6
Majority		473	7.8	N/A
Turnout		6,055	87.8	+1.5
Registered electors		6,900		
Liberal Unionist gain from Liberal		Swing	+4.6	

General election 1892: Gloucester
Party	Candidate	Votes	%	±%
Liberal	Thomas Robinson	2,885	50.7	−2.0
Liberal Unionist	Charles James Monk	2,800	49.3	+2.0
Majority		85	1.4	−4.0
Turnout		5,685	86.3	+6.7
Registered electors		6,588		
Liberal hold		Swing	−2.0	

=== Elections in the 1880s ===
General election 1886: Gloucester
Party	Candidate	Votes	%	±%
Liberal	Thomas Robinson	1,908	52.7	−3.6
Conservative	John Ward	1,713	47.3	+3.6
Majority		195	5.4	−7.2
Turnout		3,621	79.6	−7.2
Registered electors		4,547		0.0
Liberal hold		Swing	−3.6	

General election 1885: Gloucester
Party	Candidate	Votes	%	±%
Liberal	Thomas Robinson	2,222	56.3	−0.3
Conservative	William Killigrew Wait	1,726	43.7	+0.3
Majority		496	12.6	+8.7
Turnout		3,948	86.8	+0.1 (est)
Registered electors		4,547		0.0
Liberal hold		Swing	−0.3	

General election 1880: Gloucester
Party	Candidate	Votes	%	±%
Liberal	Thomas Robinson	2,797	28.9	+4.2
Liberal	Charles James Monk	2,680	27.7	+2.0
Conservative	William Killigrew Wait	2,304	23.8	−2.7
Conservative	Benjamin St John Ackers	1,898	19.6	−3.5
Majority		376	3.9	+1.3
Turnout		4,840 (est)	86.7 (est)	+3.4
Registered electors		5,583		
Liberal hold		Swing	+2.8	
Liberal gain from Conservative		Swing	+3.5	

- A petition was raised against the election of Robinson and Monk, leading to Robinson's election being made void. Although the petition against Monk was dismissed, the writ was suspended and Monk became the only MP for the constituency.

=== Elections in the 1870s ===
General election 1874: Gloucester
Party	Candidate	Votes	%	±%
Conservative	William Killigrew Wait	2,132	26.5	+4.4
Liberal	Charles James Monk	2,070	25.7	−2.2
Liberal	John Joseph Powell	1,990	24.7	−3.4
Conservative	Trevor Lawrence	1,865	23.1	+1.2
Turnout		4,029 (est)	83.3 (est)	+5.8
Registered electors		4,838		
Majority		142	1.8	N/A
Conservative gain from Liberal		Swing	+3.9	
Majority		205	2.6	−3.2
Liberal hold		Swing	−1.7	

By-election, 8 May 1873: Gloucester
Party	Candidate	Votes	%	±%
Conservative	William Killigrew Wait	1,850	51.1	+7.1
Liberal	Thomas Robinson	1,767	48.9	−7.1
Majority		83	2.2	N/A
Turnout		3,617	76.4	−1.1
Registered electors		4,737		
Conservative gain from Liberal		Swing	+7.1	

- Caused by Price's resignation after being appointed a railway commissioner.

=== Elections in the 1860s ===
General election 1868: Gloucester
Party	Candidate	Votes	%	±%
Liberal	William Philip Price	1,933	28.1	−8.2
Liberal	Charles James Monk	1,922	27.9	−5.0
Conservative	William Nassau Lees	1,520	22.1	+6.7
Conservative	Edward John Brennan	1,504	21.9	+6.5
Majority		402	5.8	+3.7
Turnout		3,440 (est)	77.5 (est)	−12.3
Registered electors		4,437		
Liberal hold		Swing	−7.5	
Liberal hold		Swing	−5.8	

General election 1865: Gloucester
Party	Candidate	Votes	%	±%
Liberal	William Philip Price	854	36.3	−0.7
Liberal	Charles James Monk	774	32.9	−2.8
Conservative	Adam Steinmetz Kennard	726	30.8	+3.5
Majority		48	2.1	−6.3
Turnout		1,540 (est)	89.8 (est)	+9.1
Registered electors		1,715		
Liberal hold		Swing	−1.2	
Liberal hold		Swing	−2.3	

By-election, 25 May 1864: Gloucester
Party	Candidate	Votes	%	±%
Liberal	John Joseph Powell	Unopposed		
Liberal hold				

- Caused by Powell's appointment as Recorder of Wolverhampton.

By-election, 26 February 1862: Gloucester
Party	Candidate	Votes	%	±%
Liberal	Charles Berkeley	761	35.2	−1.8
Liberal	John Joseph Powell	716	33.1	−2.6
Conservative	Richard Potter	687	31.7	+4.4
Majority		29	1.4	−7.0
Turnout		1,426 (est)	81.8 (est)	+1.1
Registered electors		1,742		
Liberal hold		Swing	−2.0	
Liberal hold		Swing	−2.4	

- Caused by the previous election being declared void on petition "by reason of extensive corruption".

=== Elections in the 1850s ===
General election 1859: Gloucester
Party	Candidate	Votes	%	±%
Liberal	William Philip Price	807	37.0	+3.9
Liberal	Charles James Monk	779	35.7	+3.0
Conservative	Robert Carden	595	27.3	−6.9
Majority		184	8.4	N/A
Turnout		1,388 (est)	80.7 (est)	−2.8
Registered electors		1,721		
Liberal hold		Swing	+3.7	
Liberal gain from Conservative		Swing	+3.2	

General election 1857: Gloucester
Party	Candidate	Votes	%	±%
Conservative	Robert Carden	742	34.2	+2.2
Radical	William Philip Price	717	33.1	−1.9
Whig	Maurice Berkeley	710	32.7	−0.4
Turnout		1,456 (est)	83.5 (est)	−13.3
Registered electors		1,743		
Majority		25	1.5	N/A
Conservative gain from Whig		Swing	+1.3	
Majority		7	0.4	−1.5
Radical hold		Swing	−2.1	

By-election, 31 March 1855: Gloucester
Party	Candidate	Votes	%	±%
Radical	William Philip Price	Unopposed		
Radical hold				

- Caused by Price seeking re-election after resigning to accept a contract for supplying huts to the army in the Crimea.

By-election, 4 January 1853: Gloucester
Party	Candidate	Votes	%	±%
Whig	Maurice Berkeley	761	53.2	+20.1
Conservative	Henry Thomas Hope	670	46.8	+14.8
Majority		91	6.4	+5.3
Turnout		1,431	86.6	−10.2
Registered electors		1,652		
Whig hold		Swing	+2.7	

- Caused by Berkeley's appointment as a Lord Commissioner of the Admiralty.

General election 1852: Gloucester
Party	Candidate	Votes	%	±%
Radical	William Philip Price	831	35.0	N/A
Whig	Maurice Berkeley	786	33.1	N/A
Conservative	Henry Thomas Hope	760	32.0	N/A
Turnout		1,569 (est)	96.8 (est)	N/A
Registered electors		1,621		
Majority		45	1.9	N/A
Radical gain from Conservative				
Majority		26	1.1	N/A
Whig hold				

=== Elections in the 1840s ===
General election 1847: Gloucester
Party	Candidate	Votes	%	±%
Whig	Maurice Berkeley	Unopposed		
Conservative	Henry Thomas Hope	Unopposed		
Registered electors		1,631		
Whig hold				
Conservative gain from Whig				

By-election, 11 July 1846: Gloucester
Party	Candidate	Votes	%	±%
Whig	Maurice Berkeley	Unopposed		
Whig hold				

- Appointment of Berkeley as a Naval Lord of the Admiralty

General election 1841: Gloucester
Party	Candidate	Votes	%	±%
Whig	John Phillpotts	753	28.5	−5.8
Whig	Maurice Berkeley	732	27.7	−2.8
Conservative	Henry Thomas Hope	646	24.5	+6.9
Conservative	John Loftus	510	19.3	+1.7
Majority		86	3.2	N/A
Turnout		1,336	71.2	−5.2
Registered electors		1,876		
Whig hold		Swing	−5.1	
Whig gain from Conservative		Swing	−3.6	

=== Elections in the 1830s ===
By-election, 21 May 1838: Gloucester
Party	Candidate	Votes	%	±%
Conservative	Henry Thomas Hope	685	54.2	+19.0
Whig	Edward Webb	579	45.8	−19.0
Majority		106	8.4	+7.6
Turnout		1,264	75.5	−0.9
Registered electors		1,674		
Conservative hold		Swing	+19.0	

- Hope seeks re-election after election petition against him had been dismissed.

General election 1837: Gloucester
Party	Candidate	Votes	%	±%
Conservative	Henry Thomas Hope	727	35.2	−8.8
Whig	John Phillpotts	710	34.3	+8.6
Whig	Maurice Berkeley	630	30.5	+0.1
Majority		17	0.8	−0.2
Turnout		1,279	76.4	−6.1
Registered electors		1,674		
Conservative hold		Swing	−8.8	
Whig hold		Swing	+6.5	

General election 1835: Gloucester
Party	Candidate	Votes	%	±%
Whig	Maurice Berkeley	708	30.4	−5.8
Conservative	Henry Thomas Hope	621	26.7	+12.2
Whig	John Phillpotts	598	25.7	−9.1
Conservative	William Cother	402	17.3	+2.8
Turnout		1,257	82.5	−1.4
Registered electors		1,523		
Majority		87	3.7	−2.1
Whig hold		Swing	−6.7	
Majority		23	1.0	N/A
Conservative gain from Whig		Swing	+9.9	

By-election, 9 April 1833: Gloucester
Party	Candidate	Votes	%	±%
Tory	Henry Thomas Hope	566	55.3	+26.3
Whig	Maurice Berkeley	457	44.7	−26.3
Majority		109	10.6	N/A
Turnout		1,023	71.7	−12.2
Registered electors		1,427		
Tory gain from Whig		Swing	+26.3	

- Appointment of Berkeley as a Naval Lord of the Admiralty

General election 1832: Gloucester
Party	Candidate	Votes	%	±%
Whig	Maurice Berkeley	684	36.2	−6.8
Whig	John Phillpotts	658	34.8	+18.9
Tory	Henry Thomas Hope	549	29.0	N/A
Majority		109	5.8	−19.4
Turnout		1,197	83.9	c. +33.2
Registered electors		1,427		
Whig hold				
Whig hold				

General election 1831: Gloucester
Party	Candidate	Votes	%	±%
Whig	Maurice Berkeley	730	43.0	N/A
Whig	Edward Webb	699	41.1	+0.8
Whig	John Phillpotts	270	15.9	−23.6
Majority		429	25.2	+5.9
Turnout		964	c. 50.7	c. −33.5
Registered electors		c. 1,900		
Whig hold				
Whig hold				

General election 1830: Gloucester
Party	Candidate	Votes	%
Whig	Edward Webb	830	40.3
Whig	John Phillpotts	814	39.5
Tory	Robert Bransby Cooper	415	20.2
Majority		399	19.3
Turnout		1,600	c. 84.2
Registered electors		c. 1,900	
Whig hold			
Whig gain from Tory			

== See also ==
- List of parliamentary constituencies in Gloucestershire

== Sources ==
- Williams, W. R., Parliamentary History of Co. of Gloucester, Hereford, 1898
- Robert Beatson, A Chronological Register of Both Houses of Parliament (London: Longman, Hurst, Res & Orme, 1807) A Chronological Register of Both Houses of the British Parliament, from the Union in 1708, to the Third Parliament of the United Kingdom of Great Britain and Ireland, in 1807
- D. Brunton & D. H. Pennington, Members of the Long Parliament (London: George Allen & Unwin, 1954)
- Cobbett's Parliamentary history of England, from the Norman Conquest in 1066 to the year 1803 (London: Thomas Hansard, 1808) titles A-Z
- The Constitutional Year Book for 1913 (London: National Union of Conservative and Unionist Associations, 1913)
- F. W. S. Craig, British Parliamentary Election Results 1832–1885 (2nd edition, Aldershot: Parliamentary Research Services, 1989)
- F. W. S. Craig, British Parliamentary Election Results 1918–1949 (Glasgow: Political Reference Publications, 1969)
- F. W. S. Craig, British parliamentary election results 1885–1918 (2 ed.). (Aldershot: Parliamentary Research Services, 1989)
- Maija Jansson (ed.), Proceedings in Parliament, 1614 (House of Commons) (Philadelphia: American Philosophical Society, 1988) Proceedings in Parliament, 1614 (House of Commons)
- Lewis Namier & John Brooke, The History of Parliament: The House of Commons 1754–1790 (London: HMSO, 1964)
- J. E. Neale, The Elizabethan House of Commons (London: Jonathan Cape, 1949)
- J. Holladay Philbin, Parliamentary Representation 1832 – England and Wales (New Haven: Yale University Press, 1965)
- Henry Stooks Smith, The Parliaments of England from 1715 to 1847 (2nd edition, edited by FWS Craig – Chichester: Parliamentary Reference Publications, 1973)
