= John Phillpotts (land agent) =

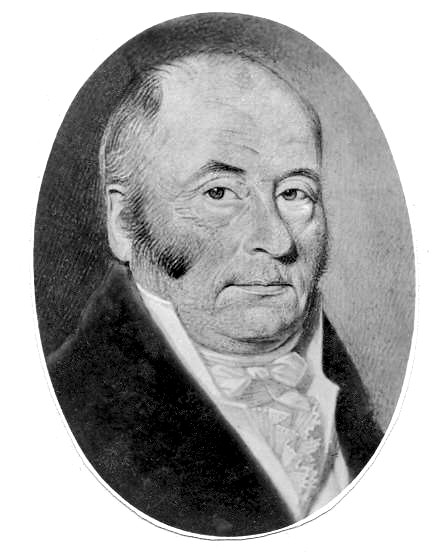
John Phillpotts

John Phillpotts (1743–1814) was a landowner and entrepreneur chiefly noted as the father of Henry Phillpotts, a controversial Bishop of Exeter.

== Biography ==
John Phillpotts inherited the Sonke estate in Llangarron, Herefordshire, in 1769 when his father died. The estate had been in the ownership of the Phillpotts family since the mid sixteenth century.

In 1770 Phillpotts moved to Bridgwater in Somerset where he acquired a brick and tile factory. The following year he married a local woman, Elizabeth Everard. This marriage ended prematurely with Elizabeth’s death just over twelve months later; no children had been born. In 1773, at the age of thirty, John married again. His new bride, Sibella Glover, was ten years younger than he and came from a well-off Somerset family.

In 1782 Phillpotts sold his brick factory and moved with his family to Gloucester where he purchased the Bell Inn and secured for himself the office of Land Agent to the Dean and Chapter of Gloucester Cathedral. He was registered as a freeman of the City of Gloucester on 28 September 1782. He acquired this status "by fine", i.e. on payment of a fee, the standard fee at that time being twenty pounds. In 1791 Phillpotts cut himself off from his rural origins by selling the Sonke. He sold off the Bell Inn in the same year.

== Family ==
John and Sibella Phillpotts had many offspring. According to one obituary notice Sibella Phillpotts had borne a total of 24 children; registration details have been found for 15. Six of the children reached adulthood: two daughters and four sons.

The eldest son, John Phillpotts (1775–1849), became a well known figure in local politics in Gloucester. The second son, Henry Phillpotts (1778–1869), became a prominent bishop. Thomas Phillpotts (1785–1862), the third surviving son, became a West Indies merchant with property in Gloucester Quays. The youngest son, George Phillpotts (1794–1853), served in the British Army; he died whilst serving as Acting Governor of Bermuda.

After the death of the elder John Phillpotts in 1814 his widow Sibella and the two surviving daughters remained living at their house in Parker's Row (now Brunswick Road) in Gloucester. The daughters did not marry, devoting themselves to good works. The younger daughter, Isabella Phillpotts (1790–1825), was known as "the angel of the prisons", and died aged 34. Sibella Phillpotts herself died in December 1833. The remaining daughter was Susanna Phillpotts (1779–1837).

John and Sibella Phillpotts, Susanna and Isabella are all buried in the family vault inside St Mary de Crypt Church, Southgate, Gloucester.

== Images ==
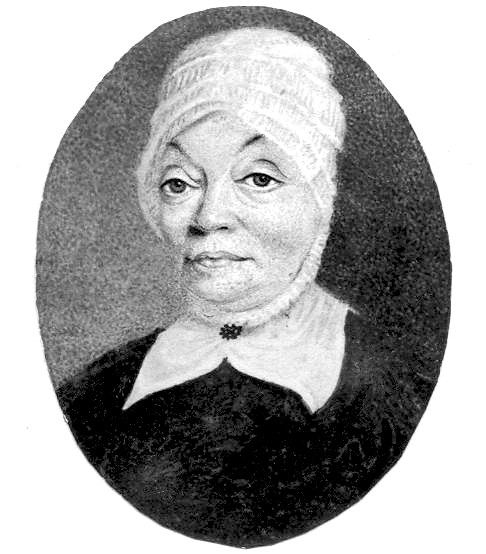
Sibella Phillpotts

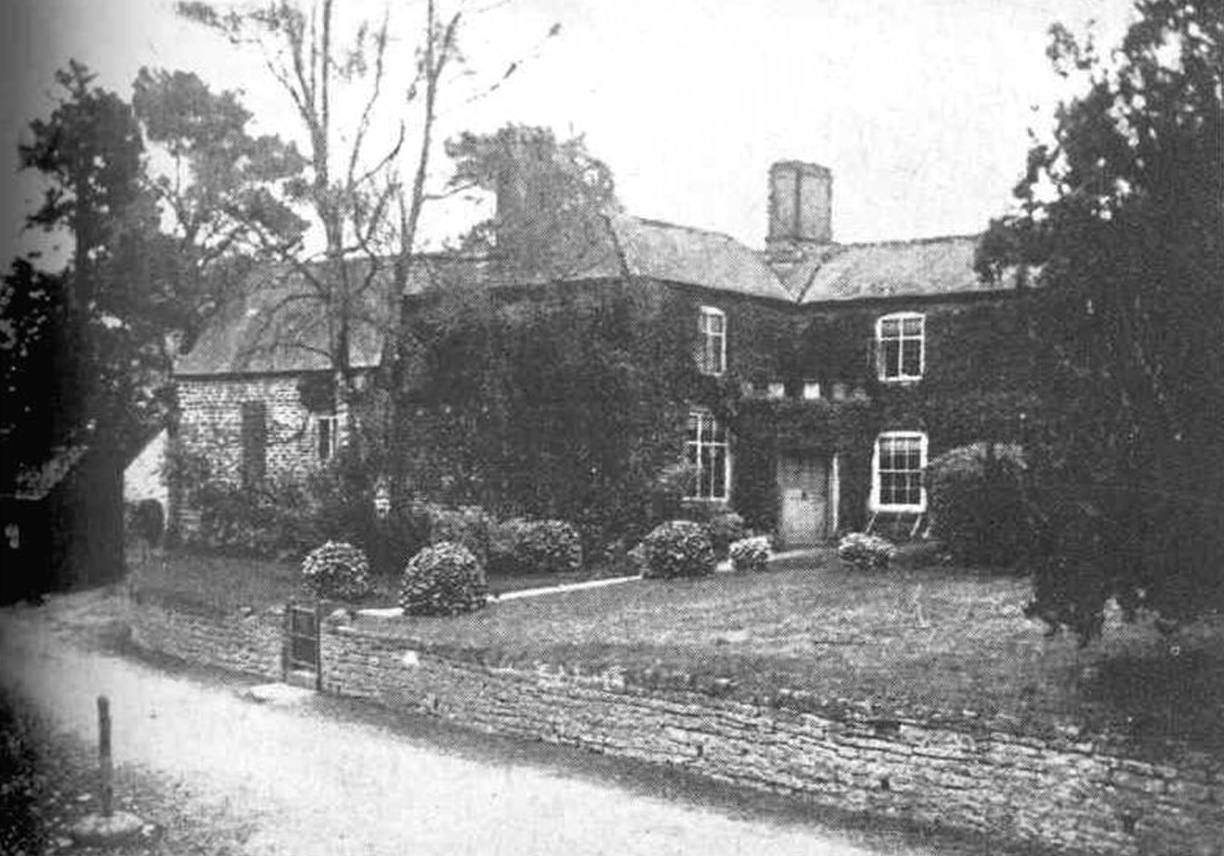
Llangarron Court, "The Sonke", in Herefordshire, the Phillpotts' ancestral home

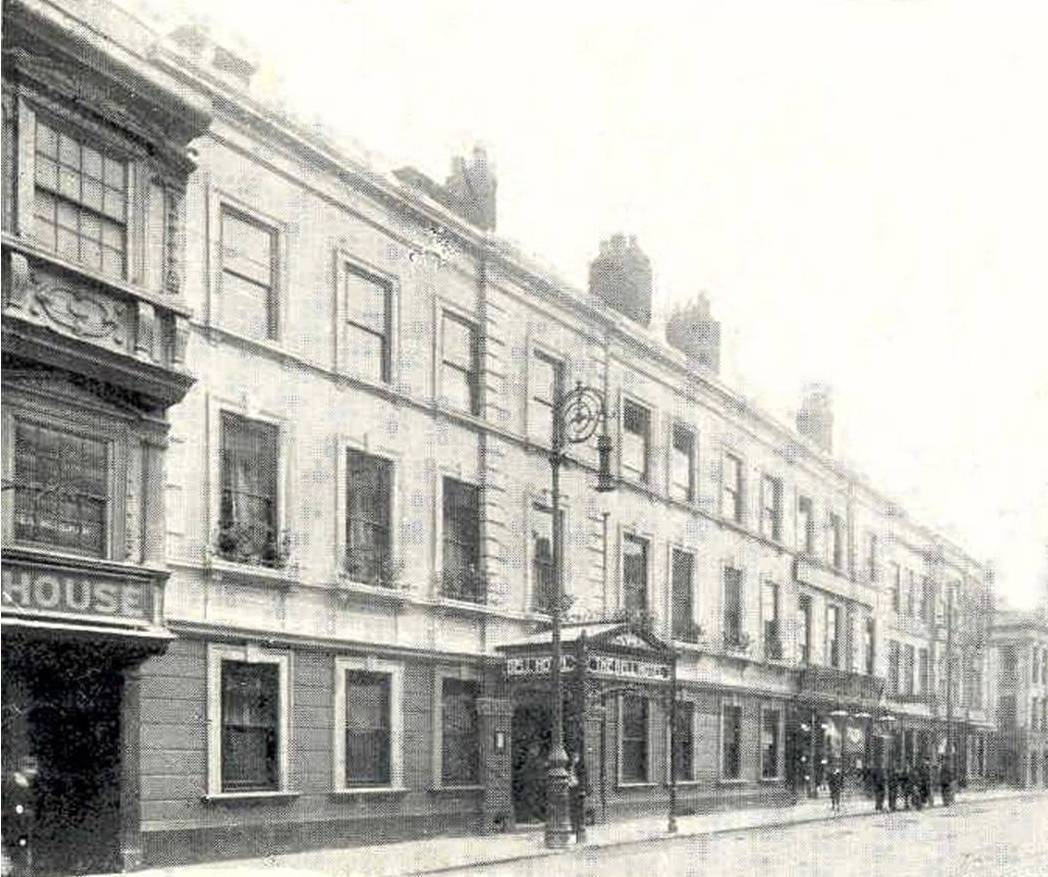
The Bell Inn, Gloucester, c.1900
