= Leslie Boyce =

British politician (1895–1955)

Sir Leslie Boyce Bt KBE KStJ JP
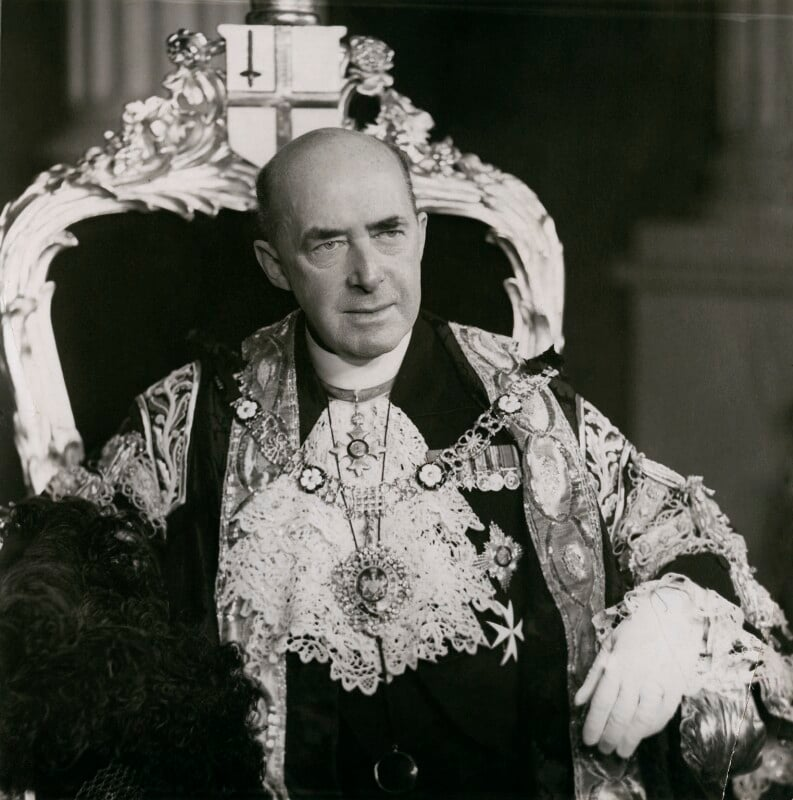
- Boyce in 1952

Lord Mayor of London
- In office 1951–1952

Member of Parliament for Gloucester
- In office 1929–1945

Personal details
- Born: Harold Leslie Boyce; 9 July 1895 Taree, New South Wales, Australia
- Died: 30 May 1955 (aged 59)
- Party: Conservative

Sir Harold Leslie Boyce, 1st Baronet KBE KStJ JP (9 July 1895 – 30 May 1955) was an Australian-born British Conservative Party politician.

Boyce was born in Taree, New South Wales, the son of Charles Macleay Boyce, a solicitor, and his wife Ethel May (née) Thorne. He was educated at The Sydney Church of England Grammar School (Shore), Sydney Grammar School and Balliol College, Oxford, and was later called to the Bar, Inner Temple. He served during the First World War in the Australian Imperial Force as a second lieutenant in the 27th Battalion, and later as a lieutenant in the 10th Battalion. In July 1916, he was wounded at Pozières and invalided back to Adelaide.

After the war he eventually settled in Cheltenham, Gloucestershire and in 1931 became Chairman of the Gloucester Railway Carriage and Wagon Company. In 1929 he was elected to the House of Commons as Member of Parliament (MP) for Gloucester, a seat he held until 1945. Boyce was also high sheriff of Gloucestershire from 1941 to 1942 and Sheriff of the City of London from 1947 to 1948 and served as Lord Mayor of London between 1951 and 1952. Boyce was appointed a Knight Commander of the Order of the Bath (KBE) in the 1944 Birthday Honours. On 24 November 1952 he was created a baronet, of Badgeworth in the County of Gloucester.

Boyce was also the President of Gloucester City Football Club from 1937 to 1949.

Boyce married Maybery Browse Bevan, daughter of Edwin Philip Bevan, in 1926. They had three sons; Richard, Charles and John. He died in May 1955, aged 59, and was succeeded in the baronetcy by his eldest son Richard. The baronetcy is currently held by Richard's son, Robert Boyce.

Lady Boyce died in 1978.

== Notes ==
Parliament of the United Kingdom
Preceded by James Nockells Horlick	Member of Parliament for Gloucester; 1929–1945	Succeeded by Moss Turner-Samuels
Political offices
Preceded by Denys Lowson	Lord Mayor of London; 1951–1952	Succeeded by Rupert de la Bère
Baronetage of the United Kingdom
New creation	Baronet (of Badgeworth); 1952–1955	Succeeded by Richard Leslie Boyce
