= John Head (priest) =

19th century Anglican priest

John Head (30 June 1783 – 3 March 1862) was an Anglican priest in Ireland in the nineteenth century.
