= John Bisley (fl. 1382–1391) =

English politician

John Bisley (fl. 1382–1391) was an English politician.

He was a member (MP) of the parliament of England for Gloucester in October 1382, February 1383, October 1383 and 1391.
