= Moss Turner-Samuels =

British politician (1888–1957)

Moss Turner-Samuels QC (19 October 1888 – 6 June 1957) was a Labour Party politician in the United Kingdom and barrister.

He was elected to the House of Commons at the 1923 general election as Member of Parliament (MP) for the Barnard Castle constituency, but lost his seat the following year in the 1924 election to the Conservative candidate, Cuthbert Headlam.

He was returned to Parliament twenty years later, in the Labour landslide at the 1945 general election, defeating the long-serving Conservative Leslie Boyce in Gloucester. He was re-elected at the next three general elections, but died in office at Westminster in 1957, aged 68. At the subsequent by-election, his seat was retained for Labour by Jack Diamond.

Parliament of the United Kingdom
Preceded by John Edwin Rogerson	Member of Parliament for Barnard Castle; 1923–1924	Succeeded by Cuthbert Headlam
Preceded by Leslie Boyce	Member of Parliament for Gloucester; 1945–1957	Succeeded by Jack Diamond
