= John Head (Gloucester MP) =

English politician

John Head (died 1391), of Gloucester, was an English politician.

He was a Member (MP) of the Parliament of England for Gloucester in April 1384 and February 1388.
