= Robert Pope (MP) =

English politician

Robert Pope (fl. 1376–1388) of Gloucester, was an English politician.

He was a member (MP) of the parliament of England for Gloucester in 1376, April 1384 and February 1388.
