= William Heyberer =

English politician

William Heyberer (died 1390/1), of Gloucester, was an English politician.

Heyberer's family had been prominent in Gloucester since the early fourteenth century. In 1361 he became bailiff of the town and the same year represented Gloucester the House of Commons. He was presumably one of the small group of influential merchants, who dominated Gloucester's trade in this period. His first term as bailiff lasted until 1365, and he also served in the role in 1370-1, 1372-3, 1376-7 and 1384-5. He represented Gloucester in parliament in 1362, 1365, 1371, 1372, 1373, October 1377, January 1380 and January 1390.

He rose to be a member of the local gentleman and sat as the Knight of the shire for Gloucestershire in November 1380, April 1384, November 1384, 1385 and February 1388.
