= John Head (cricketer) =

English cricketer

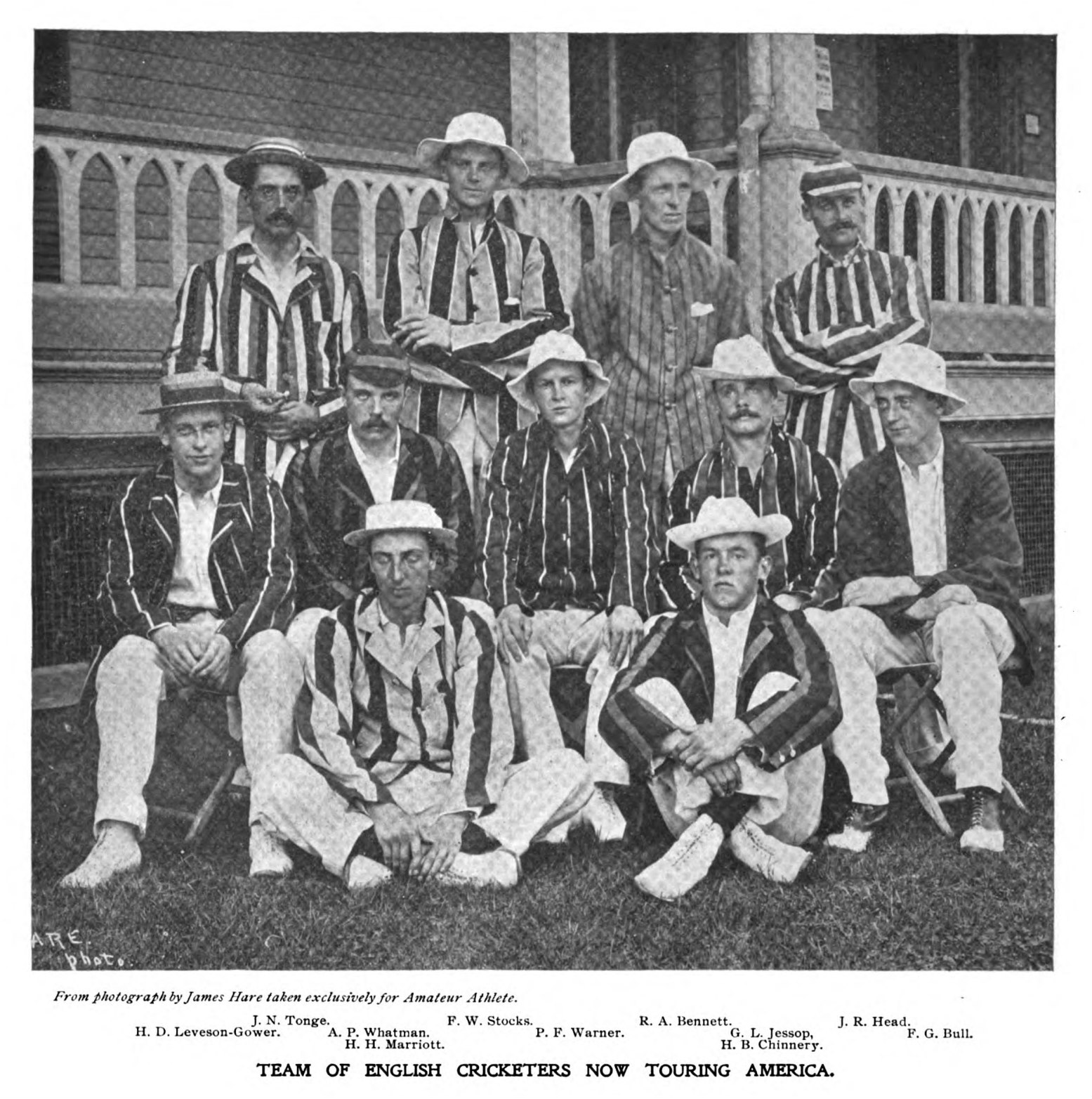
Head, far right in back row, on North American tour in 1897.

John Reginald Head (15 July 1868 – 15 May 1949) was an English first-class cricketer, active from 1892 to 1898, who played for Middlesex. He was born in Hackney and died in Folkestone.
