= Robert le Espicer =

Robert le Espicer was the member of Parliament for Gloucester in the Parliament of 1295.
