= William Massinger =

16th-century English politician

William Massinger (1514/15–1593/94) was an English politician.

== Life ==
He was the eldest son of Thomas Massinger, who was a sheriff and mayor of Gloucester. The family were close and his father's sister was Joan Cooke who founded the Crypt School in Gloucester.

William was a Member (MP) of the Parliament of England for Gloucester in November 1554, 1555 and 1571. He was sheriff for Gloucester in 1562–3 and 1566–7 and made mayor for 1569–70 and 1585–6.

He married Elizabeth, and had 3 sons (including Arthur and Richard) and a daughter.
