= Matthew Dalby =

Professor of Cell Engineering

- Born: 19 October 1972 (age 53); Leicester
- Citizenship: UK
- Education: Queen Mary University of London
- Known for: nanotopography, cell-material interface
- Scientific career
- Fields: biomaterials, mesenchymal stem cells, tissue engineering
- Workplaces: University of Glasgow
- Thesis: Hydroxyapatite/polyethylene composite: an in vitro study of osteoblast response to composition and topography (2001)
- Doctoral advisor: William Bonfield, Lucy Di Silvio
- Other academic advisors: Adam S. G. Curtis
- Website: Professor Matthew Dalby Centre for the Cellular Microenvironment

Matthew John Dalby FRSE is Professor of Cell Engineering at the University of Glasgow. His research is focused on mesenchymal stem cell interactions with nanotopography, with particular focus on the use of metabolomics, to study mechanotransduction.

He is director of the EPSRC UK hub for mesenchymal stem cell manufacturing that aims to open up regenerative cell therapies.

He completed his PhD in Biomedical Materials at Queen Mary University of London in 2001. He has an h-index of 85.
