= St Kyneburgh's Chapel, Gloucester =

Coordinates: 51.8634°N 2.2485°W

St Kyneburgh's Chapel was established in early times near the City of Gloucester. It was dedicated to St Kyneburgh and was transferred with all its lands to Llanthony Secunda Priory by Roger Earl of Hereford between 1143 and 1155. It was situated inside Gloucester's city wall at the south gate. It was formerly a possession of St Owen's Church, Gloucester.

In 1455–1456, during the era of John Hayward (Prior of Llanthony Secunda Priory 1457–1466) it was recorded, in Latin, that Llanthony Secunda Priory had existed for 319 years and the chapel of St. Kyneburgh had existed for 919 years. which might suggest a likely date for the chapel of between AD500 - AD550.
