= Roger Ball (MP) =

English politician

Roger Ball (fl. 1395–1407) of Gloucester was an English politician.

He was a member (MP) of the parliament of England for Gloucester in 1395 and 1407.
