= Richard Dalby (MP) =

Richard Dalby (died before 1455) was an English property owner, Member of Parliament (MP) and probably a trader.

Born in Gloucester, Dalby was a Member of the Parliament of England for Gloucester December 1421 to 1435.
