= Richard Kist =

Richard Kist (or Kyst) was the member of Parliament for Gloucester in the Parliament of November 1322.
