= William Goldsmith alias Smith =

English politician

William Goldsmith alias Smith (by 1475 – 1517), of Gloucester, was an English politician.

He was a member (MP) of the parliament of England for Gloucester in 1512.
