= Thomas Payne (Gloucester MP) =

16th-century English politician

Thomas Payne (by 1507 – 19 March 1560) was an English politician.

He was a member (MP) of the parliament of England for Gloucester in October 1553, April 1554 and 1558.
