= Edward Webb (politician) =

British politician (1779–1839)

Edward Webb (1779–1839), of Adwell, near Tetsworth, Gloucestershire and 181 Piccadilly, Middlesex, was a politician.

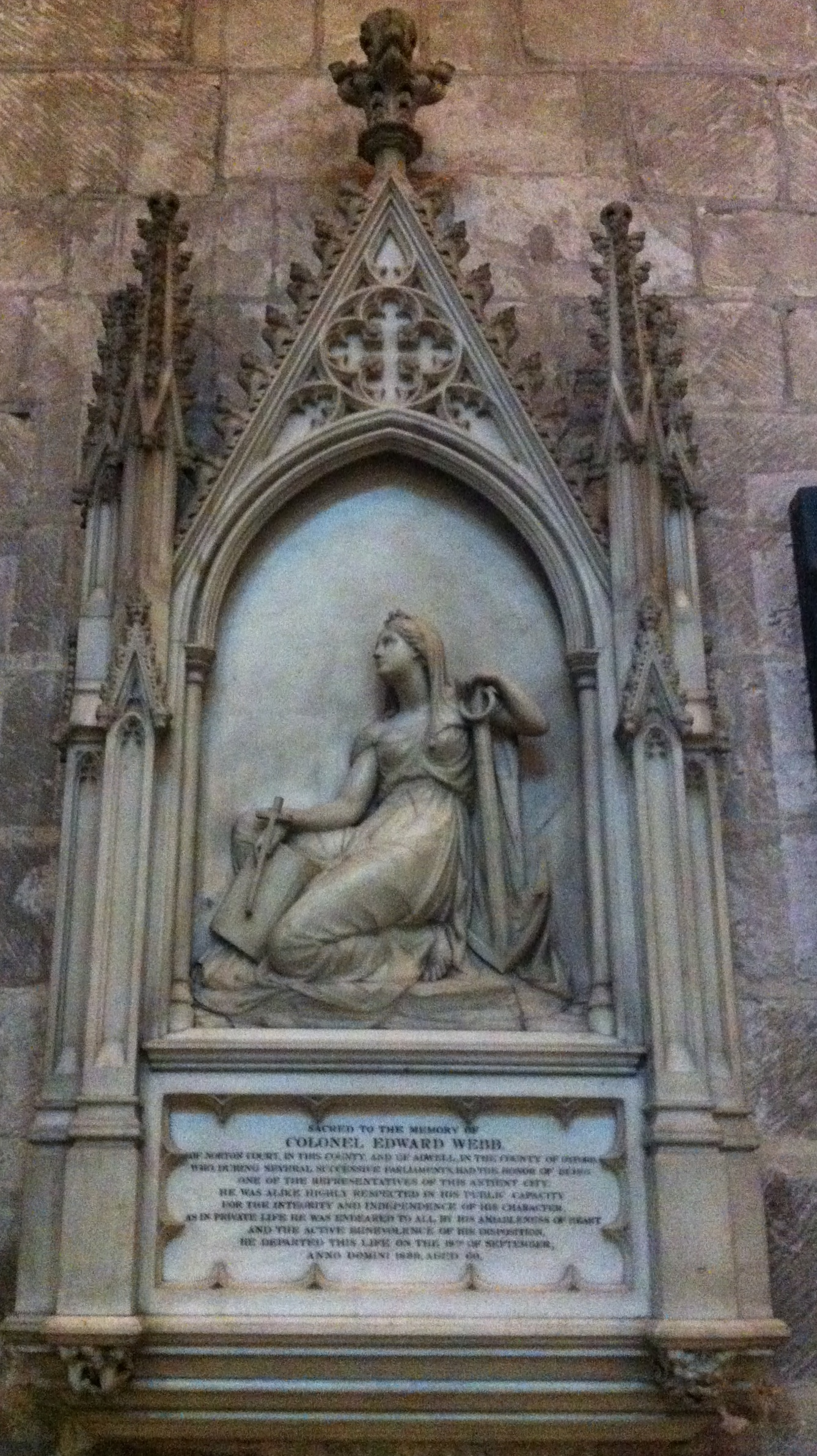
Memorial to Colonel Edward Webb in Gloucester Cathedral

He was a Member (MP) for Gloucester on 1 October 1816 – 1832.
