= Mary Caroline Bisley =

Mary Caroline Bisley (born Johanna Maria Karalina [Lina] Karsten) (23 December 1836-1917) was an early settler in Nelson, New Zealand, arriving in 1843. She came to New Zealand on the St. Pauli, from Prussia (now Germany).

Bisley's memoirs were published in 1899, and detail early settler existence in Moutere and the Nelson region. Her gravestone is featured in the "Notable Women Walk" in Nelson.
