= John de Brugge =

English politician

John de Brugge (fl. 1312–1330) was an English politician. He sat as MP for Bridgnorth in 1312 and MP for Herefordshire in 1322 and 1330.

He was the son of Simon de Brugge.
