= Justice delayed is justice denied =

Legal maxim

"Justice delayed is justice denied" is a legal maxim. It means that if legal redress or equitable relief to an injured party is available, but is not forthcoming in a timely fashion, it is effectively the same as having no remedy at all. This principle is the basis for the right to a speedy trial and similar rights which are meant to expedite the legal system, because of the unfairness for the injured party who sustained the injury having little hope for timely and effective remedy and resolution. The phrase has become a rallying cry for legal reformers who view courts, tribunals, judges, arbitrators, administrative law judges, commissions (Note: Defined broadly to include government agency, regulatory agency or statutory authority that operates under the authority of a board of commissioners, including Independent agencies of the United States government.) or governments as acting too slowly in resolving legal issues — either because the case is too complex, the existing system is too complex or overburdened, or because the issue or party in question lacks political favour. Individual cases may be affected by judicial hesitancy to make a decision. Statutes and court rules have tried to control the tendency; and judges may be subject to oversight and even discipline for persistent failures to decide matters timely, or accurately report their backlog. When a court takes a matter "under advisement" – awaiting the issue of a judicial opinion, order or judgement and forestalls final adjudication of a lawsuit or resolution of a motion – the issue of timeliness of the decision(s) comes into play.

== Origin ==
There are conflicting accounts of who first noted the phrase. According to Respectfully Quoted: A Dictionary of Quotations, it is attributable to William Ewart Gladstone; however, while Gladstone did mention the phrase during a House of Commons debate on 16 March 1868, earlier occurrences of the phrase exist. In the Babylonian Talmud, Rav Pappa notes the existence of the saying, "When justice sleeps, justice is canceled."

Mentions of justice delayed and denied are found in Pirkei Avot: "Our Rabbis taught: ...The sword comes into the world, because of justice delayed and justice denied...". Nachmanides understands the advice given by Jethro in Exodus 18:22, to judge the people at all times, as suggesting that Israel needed more judges because potential litigants would otherwise suffer injustice due to their inability to find a judge to hear their case.

Magna Carta of 1215, clause 40 of which reads, "To no one will we sell, to no one will we refuse or delay, right or justice." (Note: "Delaying justice and denying justice are considered as the same thing in the Magna Carta." — Justice John Willes of the English Court of King's Bench in the 1759 case Whitham v Hill, cited in) In 1617, upon being elevated to Lord Chancellor of England, Francis Bacon said that "Swift justice is the sweetest." (Note: Francis Bacon remarked that: "So, too, upon taking his seat as Chancellor, he said, in his address to the bar: "For the third general head of his Majesty's precepts concerning speedy justice, it rests much upon myself, and much upon others: yet so, as my procuration may give some remedy and order to it. For myself, I am resolved that my decree shall come speedily, if not instantly, after the hearing, and my signed decree speedily upon my decree pronounced. For it hath been a manner much used of late in my last lord's time, of whom I learn much to imitate, and some what to avoid; that upon the solemn and full hearing of a cause nothing is pronounced in court, but breviates are required to be made; which I do not dislike in itself in causes perplexed. ... And it was my father's ordinary word, 'You must give me time.' But yet I find when such breviates were taken, the cause was sometimes forgotten a term or two, and then set down for a new hearing, three or four terms after. And in the meantime the subject's pulse beats swift, though the chancery pace be slow. Of which kind of intermission I see no use, and therefore I will promise regularly to pronounce my decree within few days after my hearing; and to sign my decree at the least in the vacation after the pronouncing. For fresh justice is the sweetest. And to the end that there be no delay of justice, nor any other means-making or labouring, but the labouring of the counsel at the bar. ... My endeavour shall be to hear patiently, and to cast my order into such a mould as may soonest bring the subject to the end of his journey.) Another 17th-century version of the phrase is attributed to William Penn in the form "to delay Justice is Injustice". Martin Luther King Jr., used the phrase in the form "justice too long delayed is justice denied" in his "Letter from Birmingham Jail", smuggled out of prison in 1963, ascribing it to "one of our distinguished jurists".

The broader public policy implications are a source of concern. As Chief Justice of the United States Warren E. Burger noted in an address to the American Bar Association in 1970:

"A sense of confidence in the courts is essential to maintain the fabric of ordered liberty for a free people and three things could destroy that confidence and do incalculable damage to society: that people come to believe that inefficiency and delay will drain even a just judgment of its value; that people who have long been exploited in the smaller transactions of daily life come to believe that courts cannot vindicate their legal rights from fraud and over-reaching; that people come to believe the law – in the larger sense – cannot fulfill its primary function to protect them and their families in their homes, at their work, and on the public streets."

Lack of a speedy and effective resolution (amidst a bewildering multiplicity of statutes and forums with overlapping jurisdiction) can cause unwarranted delay. It has been observed that it creates a sense of frustration and unfairness, and a feeling of a lack of efficacy, which adversely affects employee morale and labor relations in the federal sector. "Delays in the law are hateful" – In diem vivere in lege sunt detestabilis – is a Latin legal maxim. On the other hand, "No delay [in law] is long concerning the death of a man," is another Latin lawyer's aphorism. And, "It is not to be imagined, that the King will be guilty of vexatious delays." For participants in the justice system, the question of whether justice was denied is whether delay is avoidable or disproportionate, or unavoidable and necessary. Proportionality is integral to such interpretations. Time taken to resolve the dispute is critical. Alternative dispute resolution, case management systems, and trial and motion practice are all integral to such determinations. (Note: "Historical acknowledgments of delays in the justice system often recognise the perspective of the accused or the disputant, and suggest that for a person seeking justice, the time taken for the resolution of their issue is critical to the justice experience. In essence, these acknowledgments are consistent with more recent research that has shown that the time taken to deal with a dispute is a, and in many cases the, critical factor in determining whether or not people consider that the justice system is fair and just.")

== Ethical principles ==
Prompt decision-making is part of "Judging 101", and is covered in every judicial handbook. "Judges should endeavour to perform all judicial duties, including the delivery of reserved judgments, with reasonable promptness." To a similar effect in Canada: "A judge shall dispose of all judicial matters promptly...." Applicable to federal judges and effective March 12, 2019, the Code of Conduct for United States Judges elucidates "the ethical canons that apply to federal judges and provides guidance on their performance of official duties and engagement in a variety of outside activities." Beyond general exhortations, it has little to say about delay in dispositions:

"Canon 3: A Judge Should Perform the Duties of the Office Fairly, Impartially and Diligently
"The duties of judicial office take precedence over all other activities. The judge should perform those duties with respect for others, and should not engage in behavior that is harassing, abusive, prejudiced, or biased. The judge should adhere to the following standards:
"(A) Adjudicative Responsibilities.
"(1) A judge should be faithful to, and maintain professional competence in, the law and should not be swayed by partisan interests, public clamor, or fear of criticism.
"(2) A judge should hear and decide matters assigned, unless disqualified, and should maintain order and decorum in all judicial proceedings. ...
"(5) A judge should dispose promptly of the business of the court."

As a commentator for the American Judicature Society noted:

"Unjustifiable delay in court proceedings, particularly in deciding cases, can have a significant impact on the parties and reflects adversely on the judicial system. Under Canon 3B(8)of the 1990 model code, a judge is required to "dispose of all judicial matters promptly, efficiently and fairly." Commentary to the 1990 model code reminds judges that "in disposing of matters promptly, efficiently and fairly, a judge must demonstrate due regard for the rights of the parties to be heard," while a comment to the 2007 model code cautions that "the duty to hear all proceedings with patience and courtesy is not inconsistent with the duty imposed . . . to dispose promptly of the business of the court. Judges can be efficient and businesslike while being patient and deliberate."

To ensure prompt and efficient disposition of cases, commentary to the code advises judges to:

- seek the necessary docket time, court staff, expertise, and resources,
- monitor and supervise cases,
- devote adequate time to judicial duties,
- be punctual in attending court,
- expeditiously decide matters under submission, and
- take reasonable measures to ensure that court officials, litigants, and their lawyers cooperate to that end."

Speedy justice in the findings and within the confines of the case, facts and the law is a stated goal of many legal systems. Conversely, "[D]epriving quick and certain justice to the litigants ... reinforces the negative images of the judicial system...." A long list of potential excuses for extended decisional slow motion are disallowed. (Note: "Delay is not excused by: •participation in voluntary, extra-judicial, professional activities, • dilatory or inadequate staff the judge's belief that a delayed decision is in the best interests of the parties, • the judge's heavy workload,• the judge's temporary, disabling condition, or • dilatory counsel.') And in weighing the wrongfulness of the delay, there are a multiplicity of factors that may come into play. (Note: "...• whether a rule establishes a time limit for deciding the case, • whether the judge failed to report the cases as undecided, as required by rule or statute, • whether the judge's record indicates a pattern of unreasonable delay or deliberate neglect, • whether a particular instance of delay so lacks legitimate justification that it is willful,• whether a judge has defied administrative directives or attempted to subvert the system, • whether the delay caused harm to the parties, or • whether the case is of a type, for example child custody matters, where expeditious disposal is particularly desirable.")

== Legislative prescriptions ==
Passed in 1990, the United States Code, Title 28, §476(a)(3) has a "novel process of making public the names of judges" who let cases go too long without decisions or judgment. Reports must be filed if motions and trials are in submission and have been pending more than six months without decision; and cases that have not been ended within three years of filing. See Civil Justice Reform Act, which tries to deal with lifetime tenured judges, judicial efficiency, judicial independence, separation of powers and legislative oversight. The Province of Quebec, Canada, has a flat statutory statement mandating six months as a requirement for ordinary civil actions. It states: 465. "A judgment on the merits must be rendered within six months after the case is taken under advisement, or within four months after the case is taken under advisement in a small claims matter."

In Canada, the six months has been treated as a mere aspirational guideline or suggestion. According to the Canadian Judicial Council, even when it took it seriously, the consequence was "a slap on the wrist." In one misconduct claim, a Quebec judge had gone over the 6-month limit in five cases. When the Council proceed up the judge's chain of command, it was handled administratively. The chief judge complained, and ipso facto the judgments appeared. A simple warning was issued, and the judge retired. In Louisiana, there exist overlapping statutes and court rules, which require that cases be decided within 30 days of submission. They require the filing of a report, if that standard is exceeded. Untimely decisions and misstatements or failure to document cases may subject a judge to judicial discipline.

== Court rule fixes ==
In some states, court rules have been adopted requiring that delays in making decisions or completing cases must be reported. For example, in Michigan the so-called "910 Report" must be filed after a matter is under advisement for more than 90 days. It requires the judge to file a certified statement with the court administrator specifying the case, the matters taken under advisement, the reasons for the delay, and the estimated time of arrival for the cure to the problem. In Indiana, "Trial Rule 53.1 and Ind. Trial Rule 53.2 are officially titled "Failure to rule on motion" and "Time for holding issue under advisement; delay of entering a judgment but are commonly known as the 'lazy judge' rules." Under those rules, the trial court has 90 days in which to render its decision; and that time can only be extended by order of the Indiana Supreme Court.

== Practical application ==
A Canadian Barrister wrote: "Delay in rendering reasons for judgment is the #1 disease afflicting judges." Chief Justice of the Supreme Court of British Columbia, John Owen Wilson, wrote about delay in the delivery of judgments:

"The public has a right to expect of a judge decisiveness....

"Litigants expect, and rightfully expect, that the judge will soon relieve them from the agony of uncertainty that prevails until judgment is delivered.

"That is not to say that it is better to be quick than right.... The aim is to be both quick and right."

Justice Wilson flatly stated: "[A] month's delay is normal. Two months delay is long. And three months is too long." Efficiency in the making of judicial decisions — and the avoidance of undue hesitancy while maintaining the accuracy and integrity of the decision-making process — implicates law and ethics. When faced with inordinate delay, a litigant and lawyer are placed between "a rock and a hard place". There is a concern about retaliation and provoking a shoot the messenger reaction. There is little if any remedy, and there is a risk that even an inquiry will provoke an adverse result.

The Latin legal maxim Actus curiæ neminem gravabit, meaning that the act of the Court shall prejudice no one, becomes applicable when a situation is protected because the Court is under an obligation to undo the wrong done to a party by the Court's own act. Thus, the court's delay should not prejudice the rights of a party, it being a well settled principle. Subsequent events ought not to frustrate a well-established cause of action. (Note: "Where the nature of the relief, as originally sought, has become obsolete or unserviceable or a new form of relief will be more efficacious on account of developments subsequent to the suit or even during the appellate stage, it is but fair that the relief is moulded, varied or reshaped in the light of updated facts. Patterson v. State of Alabama [1934] 294 U.S. 600, illustrates this position. It is important that the party claiming the relief or change of relief must have the same right from which either the first or the modified remedy may flow. Subsequent events in the course of the case cannot be constitutive of substantive rights enforceable in that very litigation ... but may influence the equitable jurisdiction to mould reliefs. Conversely, where rights have already vested in a party, they cannot be nullified or negated by subsequent events save where there is a change in the law and it is made applicable at any stage. [Citation omitted] ... Courts of justice may, when the compelling equities of a case oblige them, shape reliefs – cannot deny rights – to make them justly relevant in the updated circumstances. Where the relief is discretionary, Courts may exercise this jurisdiction to avoid injustice. Likewise, where the right to the remedy depends, under the statute itself, on the presence or absence of certain basic facts at the time the relief is to be ultimately granted, the Court, even in appeal, can take note of such supervening facts with fundamental impact....Where a cause of action is deficient but later events have made up the deficiency, the Court may, in order to avoid multiplicity of litigation, permit amendment and continue the proceeding, provided no prejudice is caused to the other side.) As was written by Justice William O. Douglas in Parker v Ellis dissenting opinion and citing Mitchell v. Overman, 103 U.S. 62, 26 L.Ed. 369, 103 U.S. at pages 64–6:

"But the principle is deep in our jurisprudence and was stated long ago in Mitchell v. Overman ...

"'(T)he rule established by the general concurrence of the American and English courts is, that where the delay in rendering a judgment or a decree arises from the act of the court, that is, where the delay has been caused either for its convenience, or by the multiplicity or press of business, either the intricacy of the questions involved, or of any other cause not attributable to the laches of the parties, the judgment or the decree may be entered retrospectively, as of a time when it should or might have been entered up. In such cases, upon the maxim actus curiae neminem gravabit, which has been well said to be founded in right and good sense, and to afford a safe and certain guide for the administration of justice,-it is the duty of the court to see that the parties shall not suffer by the delay. A nunc pro tunc order should be granted or refused, as justice may require in view of the circumstances of the particular case.'

"It is the fault of the courts, not Parker's fault, that final adjudication in this case was delayed until after he had served his sentence. Justice demands that he be given the relief he deserves. Since the custody requirement, if any, was satisfied when we took jurisdiction of the case, I would grant the relief as of that date."

This is no more than the application of the equitable principle, and well-known aphorism, that "Not only must Justice be done; it must also be seen to be done", which in turn is related to the equitable maxims, "Equity sees that as done what ought to be done" and "Equity abhors a forfeiture".

== In literature ==
In Bleak House, Charles Dickens wrote about extraordinarily protracted proceedings in the Victorian English Court of Chancery. He used as illustrated "a synonym of delay" which yielded only disastrous consequences for the participants. The estate's court case goes on for 12 years, for reasons no one understands, and the entire estate is itself dissipated in the battle. As one writer notes:

In the Victorian era, the Court of Chancery was a synonym of delay. In Bleak House Dickens invented a fictional legal case named Jarndyce and Jarndyce in order to caricature the legal system of England, and the iniquity of Chancery chiefly takes the form of procrastination: "Jarndyce and Jarndyce drones on. This scarecrow of a suit has, in course of time, become so complicated, that no man alive knows what it means" (BH1 16). As a consequence of this protraction, many characters involved in Jarndyce and Jarndyce are tortured by being held in painful anxiety" one goes insane and another's mind is consumed with "corroding care, suspense, distrust, and doubt" (BH 630)."

In the preface to Bleak House, Dickens cites two Chancery cases as especial inspirations, one of which was a "friendly suit":

At the present moment (August, 1853) there is a suit before the court which was commenced nearly twenty years ago, in which from thirty to forty counsel have been known to appear at one time, in which costs have been incurred to the amount of seventy thousand pounds, which is A FRIENDLY SUIT, and which is (I am assured) no nearer to its termination now than when it was begun. There is another well-known suit in Chancery, not yet decided, which was commenced before the close of the last century and in which more than double the amount of seventy thousand pounds has been swallowed up in costs.

Based on an 1853 letter of Dickens, the first of these cases has been identified as the dispute over the will of Charles Day, a boot blacking manufacturer who died in 1836. Proceedings were commenced in 1837 and not concluded until at least 1854. The second of these cases is generally identified as the dispute over the will of the "Acton Miser" William Jennens. (Note: William Jennens was known as "William the Miser" and the "Acton Miser") Jennens made his money loaning money to gamblers and was Britain's richest man at the time of his death in 1798, but he died without a will, aged 97. According to the BBC QI series, Jennens vs Jennens commenced in 1798 and was abandoned in 1915 (117 years later) when the legal fees had exhausted the Jennens estate of funds (£2,000,000 (equivalent to about £222,200,700 in 2025)). Thus it had been ongoing for 55 years when Bleak House was published. In fact, the dispute about Jennens' estate was not a single lawsuit; multiple unsuccessful claims were brought over many years seeking part of his estate. The estate was not exhausted of funds; the fortune went to already-wealthy relatives. The case of Jennens v Jennens of Acton, Suffolk, formed part of the inspiration for the Jarndyce and Jarndyce case at the centre of the plot of Bleak House.

== Other applications ==
Over the years, even the existence of a right to appeal – in criminal and even civil appeals – has been characterized by U.S. Supreme Court Justice David Josiah Brewer as an attack on justice and trial courts, and the ingraining of "justice delayed is justice denied". As he stated: "One thing should always be borne in mind. Whatever the sifting process of successive appeals may accomplish in ascertaining the exact truth, justice delayed is often justice denied. The early end of every litigation should be one of the great objects of all judicial proceedings." The Chicago Evening Post countered that the right to an appeal is a surety of getting the right legal result, and no attack at all on the sanctity of trials. It says this is not a proper occasion to invoke the maxim. It urges that but for the championing of a United States Supreme Court Justice, the argument would be dead on arrival. In the midst of the COVID-19 pandemic, Oregon's closing of courts – including family courts that deal with immediate needs of distressed families – has sparked protests and application of the sobriquet.

== See also ==
- Cloture
- Dilatory tactic
- Error of impunity
- Filibuster
- Justice Denied legal journal
- Might makes right
- Moratorium (law)
- Obstructionism
- Perverting the course of justice
- Red tape, inefficiency which can delay legal resolutions
- Right to an effective remedy
- Speedy trial
- Speedy Trial Clause
- Stern v. Marshall
- Statute of limitations, which requires injured parties to bring timely claims
