= Oxford Street, Gloucester =

Street in Gloucester, England

Coordinates: 51°52′06″N 2°14′19″W

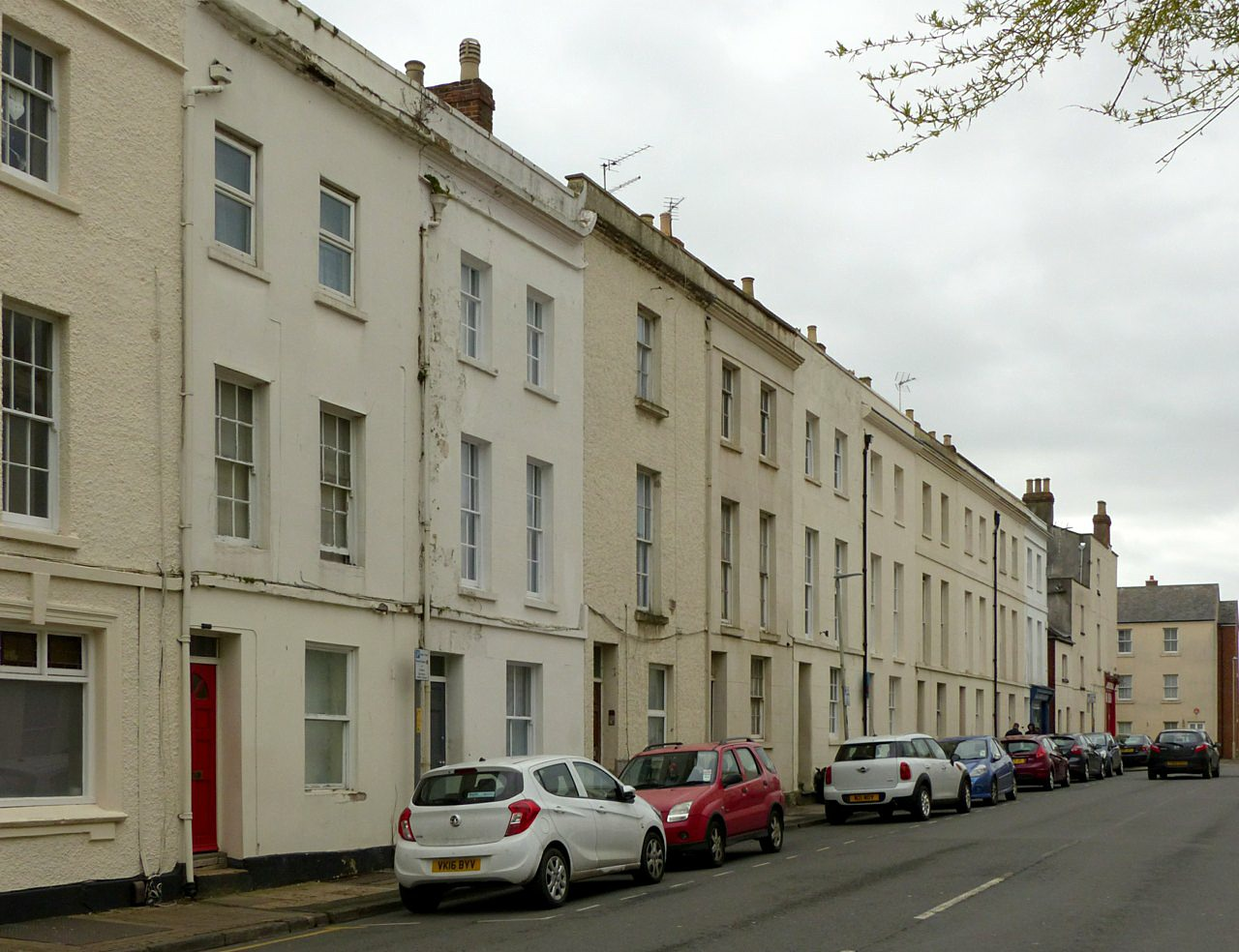
Oxford Street, Gloucester, east side looking south.

Oxford Street is located in the City of Gloucester, England. It runs between London Road in the south and Oxford Road in the north. It was developed as uniform stuccoed terraces by the attorney John Bowyer on a plot that he had bought in 1823.

Oxford Street is the location of a number of listed buildings:

- 1a-11, 15 and 17, Oxford Street
- 29 and 31, Oxford Street
- The Victoria Inn (1823–25)
- 2 to 20, Oxford Street

== See also ==
- Clapham
- Worcester Street
