= George Worrall Counsel =

British solicitor and property developer

- Born: c. July 1758; Gloucester, England
- Died: 19 January 1843 (aged 84); Gloucester, England
- Occupation: Solicitor
- Known for: Author of the history and description of the city of gloucester &c., 1829.

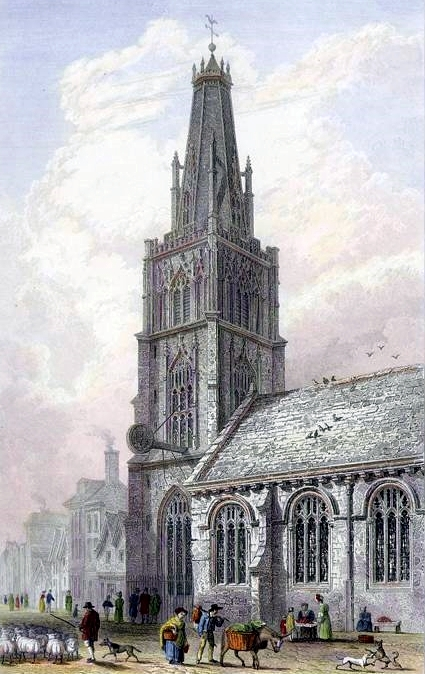
St Nicholas' Church, Gloucester

George Worrall Counsel (c. July 1758 – 19 January 1843) was a Gloucester solicitor, antiquarian, alderman, and property developer.

He was first apprenticed to an ironmonger but left that to study law and qualified as a solicitor and proctor. He was a noted antiquarian, helping Thomas Fosbroke with his work, and in 1829 published his own History and Description of the City of Gloucester.

He was a leading property developer in Gloucester and from 1822 developed the area later known as Clapham, now part of Kingsholm, on Monkleighton Grounds.

== Early life and family ==
George Worrall Counsel was born around July 1758 in Holy Trinity parish in central Gloucester, the son of the surgeon or apothecary Joshua Counsel and his wife Anne, daughter of David Gardner of Stroud, clothier. He was christened at St Nicholas' Church in Gloucester on 13 July 1758.

He was educated at The King's School, which may be where he met his life-long friend Jemmy Wood.

He married Anne, daughter of James Trimnell of Jamaica, at Gloucester on 22 February 1811. They had daughters Beata Maria, Anne, and Juliet Albina.

== Career ==
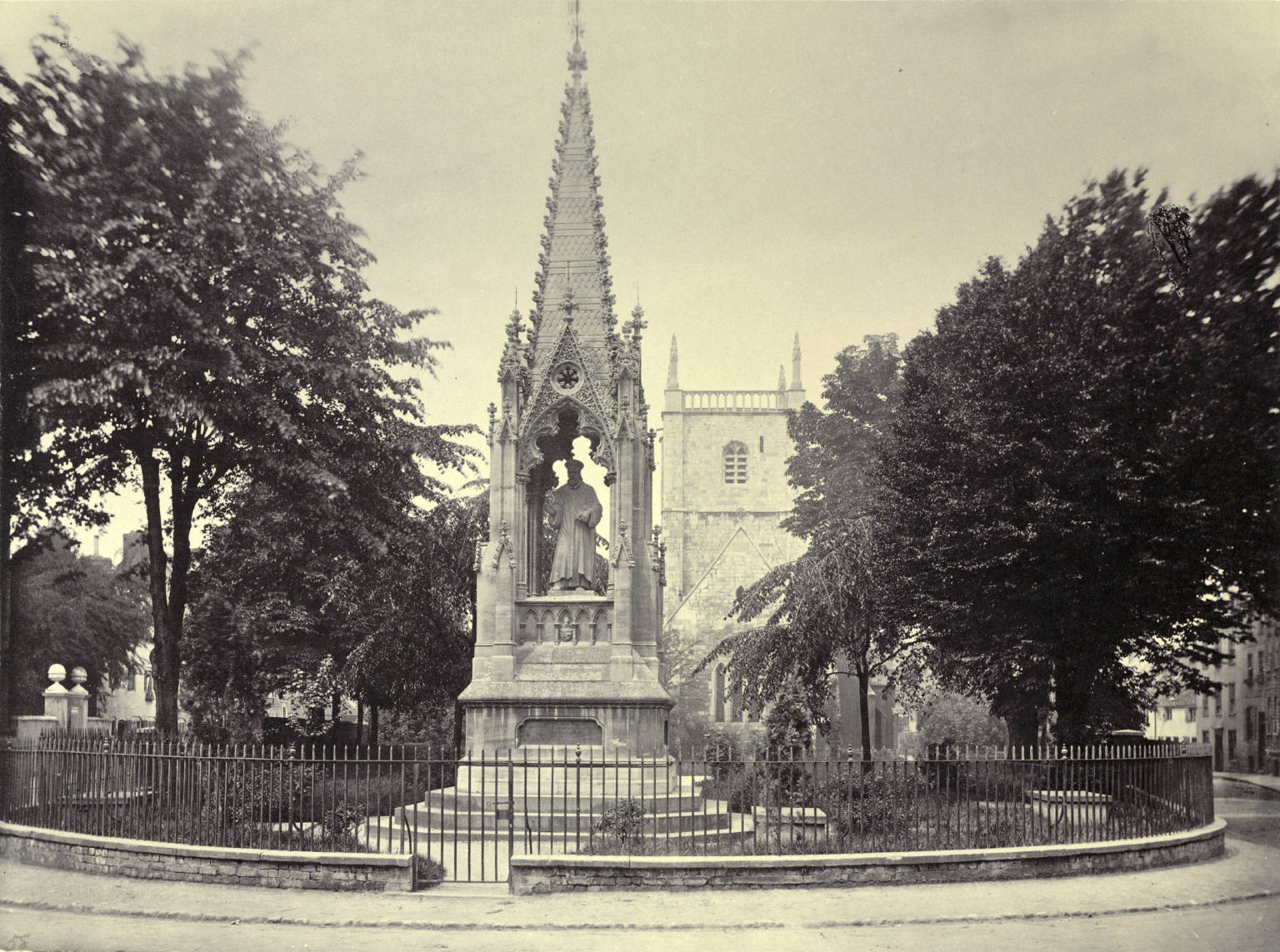
Bishop Hooper's Monument, Gloucester

Counsel was first apprenticed to an ironmonger but left that to study law and qualified as a proctor and solicitor. He was appointed a freeman of Gloucester in 1789. He was active in local politics and in 1836 was recorded as an alderman of the Corporation of Gloucester.

He became a leading property developer in the city in the early nineteenth century after he bought land in Monkleighton Grounds in the north-east of the city that he developed from 1822 into the area later known as Clapham, now part of Kingsholm, on which he built several hundred houses for artisans. Streets there included Worrall Street and Counsel Street, neither of which now exist after the area was comprehensively redeveloped in the twentieth century during slum clearance.

He was a noted antiquarian, helped Thomas Fosbroke with his work, and in 1829 published his own History and Description of the City of Gloucester in which he acknowledged that he had borrowed heavily from the work of Thomas Rudge (died 1825). In 1840 he published his account of the life and martyrdom of Bishop Hooper who was burned at the stake in Gloucester in 1555.

In their obituary of Counsel, The Gentleman's Magazine reported that he was an old and close friend of Jemmy Wood (died 1836), the owner of the Gloucester Old Bank who became nationally known as "The Gloucester Miser", and who was said to be "the richest commoner in His Majesty's dominions". Wood was said to have left Counsel £10,000 in the codicil to his (disputed) will.

== Death and legacy ==
Counsel died at Gloucester on 19 January 1843 and was buried in the city on the 26th of that month. After his death, some of his papers were acquired by the collector Sir Thomas Phillipps, 160 of which were sold by Sotheby's in 1971.

== Selected publications ==
- "The Old Church of St. Mary de Lode, Gloucester", The Gentleman's Magazine, 1826 (ii), pp. 505–506.
- The History and Description of the City of Gloucester, From the Earliest Period to the Present Time, &c. J. Bulgin, Gloucester, 1829.
- Some Account of the Life and Martyrdom of John Hooper, D.D., Successively Bishop of Gloucester and Worcester; With an Appendix, Containing the History of the Bishoprick of Gloucester. Lewis Bryant, Gloucester, 1840.
