= Catherine Foster (murderer) =

English woman hanged for murder (1829–1847)

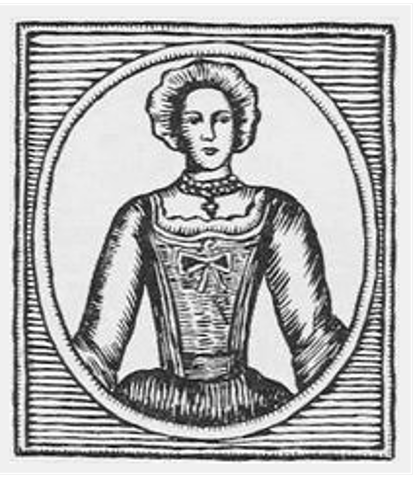
Catherine Foster

Catherine Foster (1829–1847) was an English woman who murdered her husband after three weeks of marriage. She was not yet 18 when hanged and was one of the youngest females ever hanged in England.

== Background ==
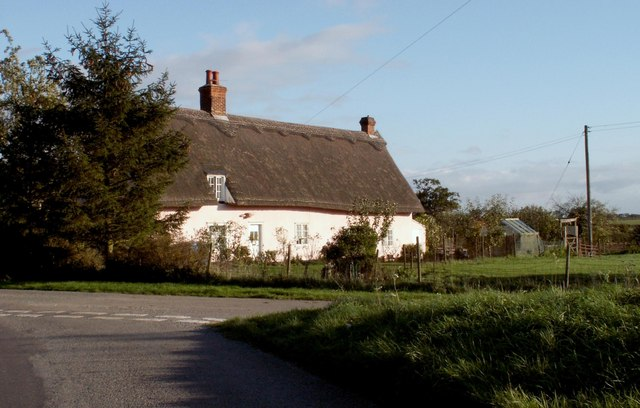
The Foster's house in Acton, Suffolk (central section)

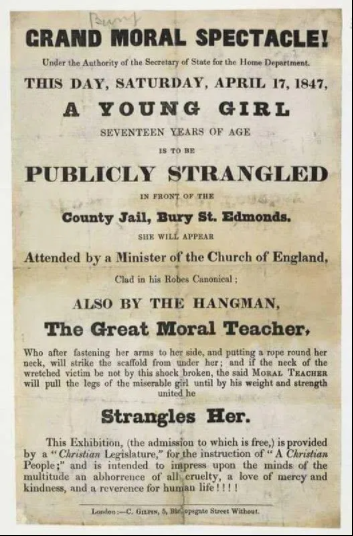
Poster promoting the execution of Catherine Foster in 1847

She was born Catherine Morley in June 1829 the daughter of William Morley (d.1843). She received a basic education at the Charity School in Acton. She went into service as a maid around 1844 with Mr. Wade of Waldingfield to the south. Around July 1845 she moved to the service of Mr Bird at Bulmer.

Catherine was described as "simple-minded". She lived with her mother Maria Morley in Acton, Suffolk. From 1840 they lived in the central section of an idyllic thatched farmhouse, split into three units. John had known her many years and could be called a "childhood sweetheart". He had visited her while she was in service as a maid. She ceased work in September 1846 and returned to Acton to live with her mother and younger siblings, Thomas and Hannah. John Foster was keen to marry, mainly so he could leave home, which he shared with his mother and two sisters each of which had a "chance child" (illegitimate baby). He sought a calmer environment.

On 28 October 1846, she was married by Rev. Ottley to John Foster (b.1822) at All Saints Church in Acton, Suffolk, a small village near Sudbury. She had known him for over two years. They went to live with Catherine's mother and young brother. Mrs. Morley worked as a washerwoman in the village. John worked as a farm laborer with a Mr. Meekings at the village of Chilton, a few miles to the south.

Catherine spent ten days between the marriage and the crime staying with her aunt in Pakenham to the north. She said the reason for this was the lack of opportunity to visit her aunt while she was in service. Three days before the murder she bought arsenic from Mr.Ely, who was the chemist in Sudbury.

She had visited John's mother, Elizabeth Foster who lived nearby, on the day before the death.

John had fallen from the hay wagon about two weeks before his death and complained of a pain in his side from this time. This was used as a diversion by the defence in the trial.

== Murder ==
On 17 November 1846 she made her husband suet dumplings laced with arsenic which he ate around 6pm. He felt ill immediately. He took to bed in a small ground floor room and Mrs Morley made him some gruel with a little brandy added. He vomited into a basin. Mrs Morley threw the basin onto the dunghill in the neighbour (Mordecia Simpson)'s garden, at the side of her own garden, and the next morning the neighbour's chickens had eaten the vomit and died. Catherine slept upstairs with her mother rather than with John. Catherine left at 8am the next day to fetch Mr Robert Jones, a physician at Long Melford but only arrived there at 10am despite the distance being only two miles. From her vague description the doctor presumed it was English cholera and gave her two powders to administer. These were his own mix of mercury, chalk and powdered rhubarb. She did not explain that she was John's wife. He promised to call later. Mrs Morley had left the house at 10am leaving John alone until 2pm when young Thomas Morley returned from school. She returned at 3pm and John died slightly before 4pm, when his mother arrived. He had died in bed but leaning on the shoulder of Mrs Morley who sat at his bedside. The doctor arrived at 5pm or 6pm and found him dead. On inspection of the bed sheets he thought he had died of bilious diarrhoea. But he decided a post mortem was required. He removed the stomach and part of the intestine in a jar.

A coroner held an inquest the following Saturday at the Crown tavern in Acton. Young Thomas Morley was taken into care at Boxford for 15 days before being released to his mother. The coroner ordered Dr Jones to investigate the stomach and intestine further, and advocated the use of a Dr E W Image, a local expert. Jones met Image to conduct this test on 23 November. They used the Reinsch test and Marsh test and arsenic was found. Dr Jones said he had no suspicion of this until that point. As a conclusive test they also decided to further check John's body. As John Foster was already buried they met at Acton churchyard and the examination included opening of the coffin. This fully confirmed death by arsenic poisoning. An examination of the dead chickens on both sides (both Mordecai Simpson and George Poole) also showed arsenic.

Catherine was arrested after the inquest and made no great protest.

The trial took place on 29 March 1847 and was presided over by Baron Pollock at Bury St Edmunds Assizes. Prosecution was led by Mr Gurdon. Defence was led by Mr Power. Catherine entered a plea of "Not Guilty". John's co-workers, James Pleasance and William Steed, testified that John was well on the preceding day. One of the main witnesses was Catherine's little brother, 8 year old Thomas Morley. Tom said he had gone home for dinner from the nearby school at noon and had bread and butter. He was alone in the house with John Foster for around 40 minutes. He testified that he had had dumplings and potatoes on the same evening as John Foster's last meal but Catherine took John's dumpling from a different cloth. Catherine ate from the same dumpling as fed Thomas. Tom explained the sequence of events but also said that he did not know how to tell the time.

The defence, led by Mr Power, felt the case was highly prejudiced by a number of hand-bills printed and circulated widely in the Suffolk area, proclaiming Catherine's guilt. He stressed that Catherine had no motive for the crime and nothing to gain. The defence focussed solely on the lack of motive. The jury found her guilty after retiring for 15 minutes. The court had a recess at 7pm and reconvened at 9pm for sentencing. Baron Pollock donned the black death cap and pronounced that Catherine was to be hanged for her crime. She did not react.

On 12 April she made a written confession of her guilt. Although one source stated that she murdered her husband as she loved another man, there is no record of this in any contemporary record nor in her confession.

The execution was highly publicised in advance and was described as a "public strangulation". She was hanged in front of a crowd of 10,000 persons at Market Hill in a meadow on the west side of the Prison at Bury St Edmunds at 9am on Saturday 17 April 1847. The drop did not kill her and she "danced" for several minutes before dying. The crowd shouted "shame" and "murder". She was the last woman to be hanged in Suffolk.

She was buried in the prison grounds at Bury St Edmunds.

== Aftermath ==
The Marquess of Lansdowne objected in the strongest of terms to the promotion of the execution but it was ultimately found that, despite the sensationalism, the trial and execution was performed with the correct decorum. The manner and nature of this execution was one of the factors which pushed parliament to cease public executions and to limit executions to the privacy of the prison walls.

== Trivia ==
The execution at Bury St Edmunds was the first since that of William Corder in the Red Barn Murder of 1827.

On 18 July 1838 Catherine's father William Morley was suspected of murdering an old man, William Patrick or Kilpatrick, following an evening drinking together in Sudbury. Officially Patrick committed suicide, by hanging him from a direction post at a country crossroads at Lavenham. No charges were brought against Morley but the circumstances certainly were suspicious.
