= Jemmy Wood =

British owner of the Gloucester Old Bank (1756–1836)

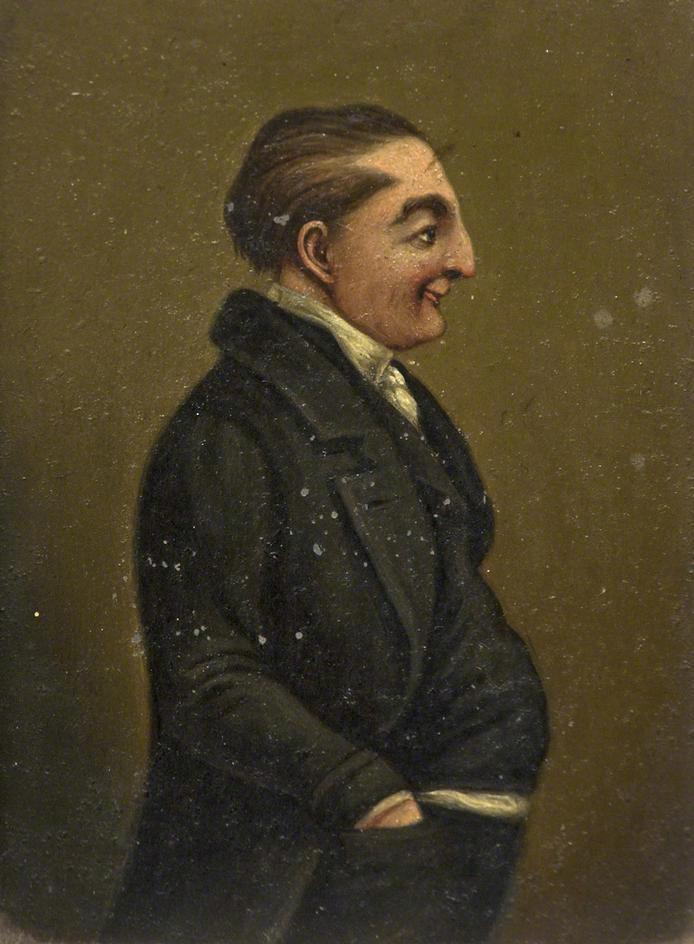
- A print by George Rowe of Cheltenham depicting James Wood with the Gloucester Old Bank in the background.
- Born: October 7, 1756; England
- Died: April 20, 1836 (aged 79)
- Occupation: Banker

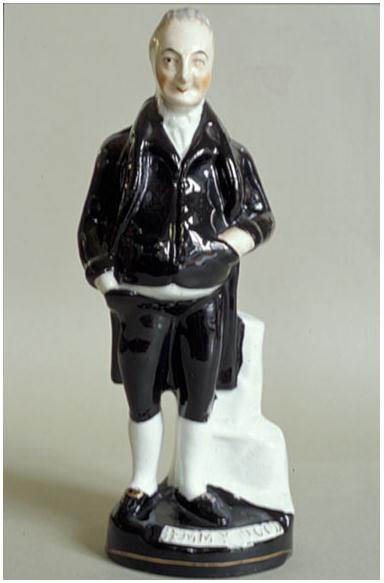
A figure of James Wood.

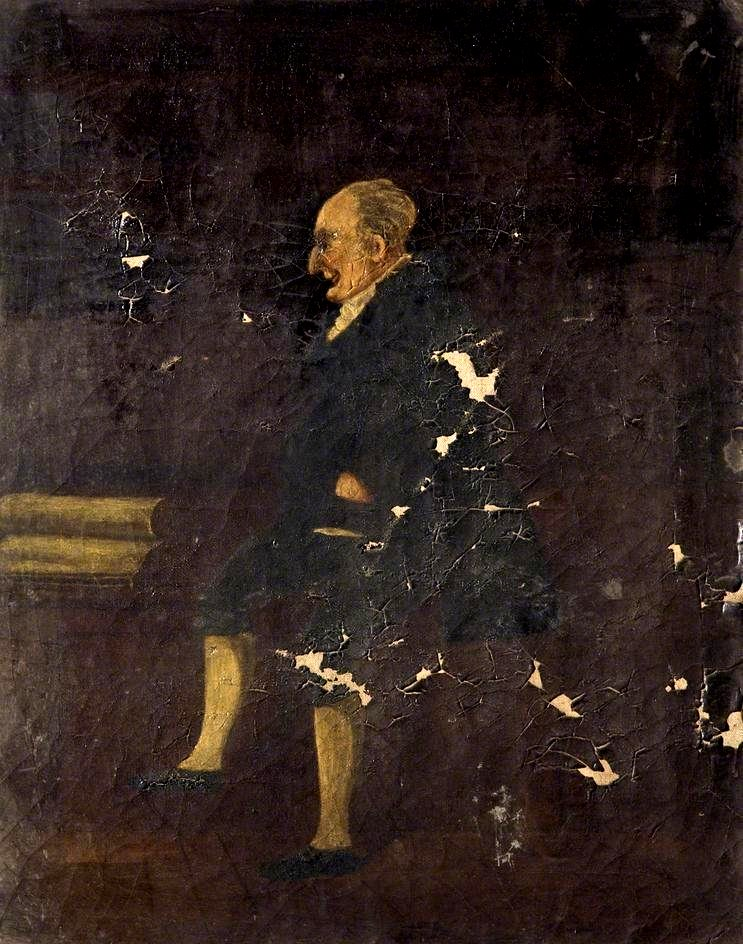
A portrait of James Wood (possibly based on a print by George Rowe).

James "Jemmy" Wood (7 October 1756 – 20 April 1836) was the owner of the Gloucester Old Bank who became nationally known as "The Gloucester Miser". His wealth of around £900,000 was stated at the time to have made him "the richest commoner in His Majesty's dominions".

== Early life ==
Wood was born on 7 October 1756 in Westgate Street, Gloucester and baptised at St Michael's Church on 19 October 1756. He was the third child and only son of Richard and Elizabeth Wood and he attended either Sir Thomas Rich's School or The King's School.

== Gloucester Old Bank ==
Wood inherited the Gloucester Old Bank from his grandfather who had founded it in 1716. The bank was said to have been one of the oldest private banks in Britain, having survived the financial consequences of the Napoleonic Wars when many other banks went out of business. It operated from Wood's drapery shop in Westgate Street; his practice was to offer no interest on deposits of less than one year. The whole bank was believed to have consisted of just Wood and two clerks. On the counter were nailed counterfeit coins as a warning to customers not to try and pass them off on the bank. The bank was taken over by the County of Gloucestershire Banking Company in 1838, which eventually became part of Lloyds Bank in 1897.

Wood also owned an undertaking business and extensive land in and around the City of Gloucester.

== Gloucester City ==
Wood never appeared in lists of city benefactors and despite serving as City Sheriff for 1811 and 1813, and as an Alderman from 1820 until his death, it is thought that he never became Mayor because the expense of the job was too great for him to bear. He was not averse to spending other people's money, however. In 1818, 47 people dined at the city's expense at a dinner given for the Duke of Gloucester at which they ate a turtle weighing 150 pounds (68 kg) given to the city by Lord Henry Howard-Molyneux-Howard.

== In fiction ==
Charles Dickens may have been inspired by the stories about the Gloucester Miser to create the character of Ebenezer Scrooge in his 1843 novella A Christmas Carol. A character by the name of Dismal Jemmy appears in The Pickwick Papers and Jemmy Wood of Gloucester is mentioned in Our Mutual Friend. It has also been speculated that the fictional court case of Jarndyce v Jarndyce in Bleak House may have been based on the case that arose following irregularities in Wood's will, although the court system of the time was so slow and expensive that there are a number of other possible cases on which Jarndyce could just as easily have been based.

== Death ==
Wood died in 1836 and was buried in St Mary de Crypt Church in Gloucester where there is a gravestone to his memory in the chancel. The crowd at his funeral reportedly "...evinced a levity of demeanor inconsistent with the solemnity of the occasion" and his coffin was said to have been stoned.

Problems over his will led to a long court case that soaked up much of the funds in the estate. Wood never married and had no children. He left around £900,000 to be shared equally between Sir Matthew Wood, John Chadborn (Solicitor), Jacob Osborne and John S. Surman, who were also his executors. A damaged codicil was found that left money to the City of Gloucester and to other beneficiaries and it was wrangling over the authenticity of the codicil that caused the settlement of the estate to be delayed. Chadborn hanged himself in 1839 and the obituary notice in The Gentleman's Magazine noted that since Wood's death, Chadborn's attention had "been almost wholly engrossed with the proceedings consequent upon the disputed validity of the will".

== See also ==
- George Worrall Counsel
