= Past Master =

A past master is one who is highly skilled in a particular field or activity.

Past Master(s) may also refer to:

- Past Master (novel), a novel by R. A. Lafferty
- The Past-Master, a 1970 Bulgarian film
- Past Masters, a Beatles compilation album
- Past Master, a type of Masonic lodge officer
- Pastmaster, a villain in SWAT Kats: The Radical Squadron
- InteLex Past Masters, a collection of scholarly editions of classic works
