= Forensic toxicology =

Use of toxicology for investigations

Forensic toxicology is a multidisciplinary field that combines the principles of toxicology with expertise in disciplines such as analytical chemistry, pharmacology and clinical chemistry to aid medical or legal investigation of death, poisoning, and drug use. The paramount focus for forensic toxicology is not the legal implications of the toxicological investigation or the methodologies employed, but rather the acquisition and accurate interpretation of results. Toxicological analyses can encompass a wide array of samples. In the course of an investigation, a forensic toxicologist must consider the context of an investigation, in particular any physical symptoms recorded, and any evidence collected at a crime scene that may narrow the search, such as pill bottles, powders, trace residue, and any available chemicals. Armed with this contextual information and samples to examine, the forensic toxicologist is tasked with identifying the specific toxic substances present, quantifying their concentrations, and assessing their likely impact on the individual involved. Recent advances in forensic toxicology have expanded the field past traditional laboratory analysis to on-site rapid drug detection.

In the United States, forensic toxicology compromises three distinct disciplines: Postmortem toxicology, Human Performance toxicology, and Forensic Drug Testing (FDT). Postmortem toxicology involves analyzing biological specimens obtained during an autopsy to identify the impact of drugs, alcohol, and poisons. A broad array of biological specimens, including blood, urine, gastric contents, oral fluids, hair, and tissues, may undergo analysis. Forensic toxicologists collaborate with pathologists, medical examiners, and coroners to ascertain the cause and manner of death. Human Performance toxicology examines the dose-response relationship between drugs present in the body and their effects. This field plays a pivotal role in shaping and implementing laws related to activities such as driving under the influence of alcohol or drugs. Lastly, Forensic Drug Testing (FDT) pertains to detecting drug use in contexts such as the workplace, sport doping, drug-related probation, and screenings for new job applicants.

Identifying the ingested substance ingested is frequently challenging due to the body's natural processes (as outlined in ADME). It is uncommon for a chemical to persist in its original form once inside the body. For instance, heroin rapidly undergoes metabolism, ultimately converting to morphine. Consequently, a thorough examination of factors such as injection marks and chemical purity becomes imperative for an accurate diagnosis. Additionally, the substance might undergo dilution as it disperses throughout the body. Unlike a regulated dose of a drug, which may contain grams or milligrams of the active constituent, an individual sample under investigation may only consist of micrograms or nanograms.

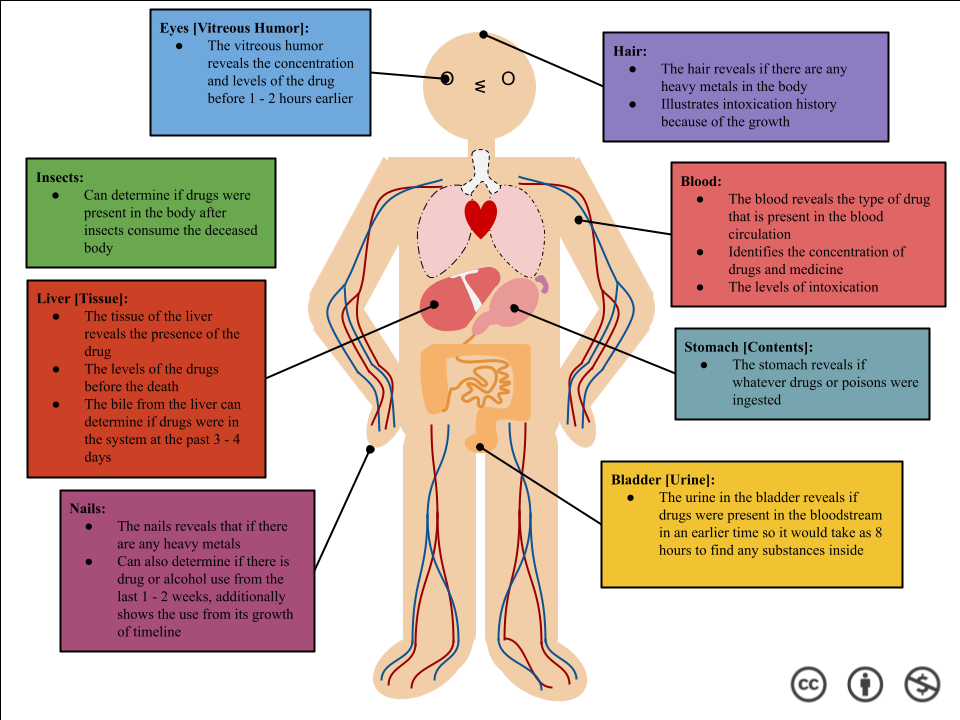
Drug's Location in the Body

== How certain substances affect your body ==
=== Alcohol ===
Alcohol gains access to the central nervous system by entering the blood stream through the lining of the stomach and small intestine. Subsequently, it transverses the blood brain barrier via the circulatory system. The absorbed alcohol can diminish reflexes, disrupt nerve impulses, prolong muscle responses, and impact various other physiological functions throughout the body.

=== Marijuana ===
Similar to alcohol, marijuana is absorbed into the bloodstream and crosses the blood brain barrier. Notably, the THC released from marijuana binds to the CB-1 cannabinoid receptors, inducing various effects. These effects encompass mood changes, altered perception of time, and heightened sensitivity, among others.

=== Cocaine ===
Cocaine, in contrast to marijuana or alcohol, is a powerful stimulant. Upon entering the bloodstream, it rapidly reaches the brain within minutes, causing a significant surge in dopamine levels. The effects of cocaine are intense but short-lived, typically lasting about 30 minutes. The primary method of administration is through nasal insufflation (snorting), although it can also be smoked in crystal rock form. The rapid increase in dopamine levels during use contributes to a pronounced and challenging comedown, often prompting individuals to seek higher doses in subsequent use to achieve the same effects as experienced previously. This pattern can contribute to the development of addiction. The effects of cocaine use include increased energy and euphoria, accompanied by potential negative effects such as paranoia, rapid heart rate, and anxiety, among others.

== Examples ==
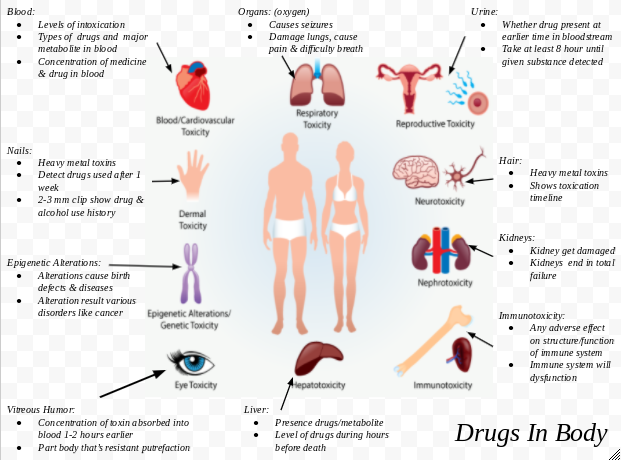
Drugs In Body

=== Urine ===
A urine sample, originating from the bladder, is obtainable both voluntarily and taken post-mortem. Notably, urine is less prone to viral infections such as HIV or Hepatitis B in comparison to blood samples. Many drugs exhibit higher concentrations and more prolonged detection in urine compared to blood. The collection of urine samples is a non-invasive process that doesn't necessitate professional assistance. While urine is commonly used for qualitative analysis, it does not provide indications of impairment since the presence of drugs in urine merely signifies prior exposure. The duration of drug detection in urine varies; for instance, alcohol is detectable for 7–12 hours, cocaine metabolites for 2–4 days, and morphine for 48–74 hours. Marijuana, a substance with variable detection times depending on usage patterns, can be detected for 3 days after a single use, 5–7 days for moderate use (four times per week), 10–15 days for daily use, and less than 30 days for long-term heavy use; contingent upon frequency and intensity of consumption.

=== Blood ===
A blood sample of approximately 10 ml (0.35 imp fl oz; 0.34 US fl oz) is usually sufficient to screen and confirm most common toxic substances. A blood sample provides the toxicologist with a profile of the substance that the subject was influenced by at the time of collection; for this reason, it is the sample of choice for measuring blood alcohol content in drunk driving cases.

=== Hair ===
Hair is capable of recording medium to long-term or high dosage substance abuse. Chemicals in the bloodstream may be transferred to the growing hair and stored in the follicle, providing a rough timeline of drug intake events. Head hair grows at rate of approximately 1 to 1.5 cm a month, and so cross sections from different sections of the follicle can give estimates as to when a substance was ingested. Testing for drugs in hair is not standard throughout the population. The darker and coarser the hair the more drug that will be found in the hair. If two people consumed the same amount of drugs, the person with the darker and coarser hair will have more drug in their hair than the lighter haired person when tested. This raises issues of possible racial bias in substance tests with hair samples. Hair samples are analyzed using enzyme-linked immunosorbent assay (ELISA). In ELISA, an antigen must be immobilized to a solid surface and then complexed with an antibody that is linked to an enzyme.

=== Bone Marrow ===
Bone marrow can be used for testing but that depends on the quality and availability of the bones. So far there is no proof that says that certain bones are better than others when it comes to testing. Extracting bone marrow from larger bones is easier than smaller bones. Forensic toxicologists often use bone marrow to find what type poisons used, which can include cocaine or ethanol. Ethanol specifically is one of the most abused drugs worldwide, be it through alcohol consumption and abuse being a leading cause in death. Suicides, car crashes, and a variety of crimes are often performed under severe alcohol influence. The process of ethanol determination allows forensic toxicologists to utilize bone marrow post-mortem and isolate the ethanol level a person had been, and the metabolic speed of breakdown at which can be traced back to time of death.

=== Other ===
Other bodily fluids and organs may provide samples, particularly samples collected during an autopsy. A common autopsy sample is the gastric contents of the deceased, which can be useful for detecting undigested pills or liquids that were ingested prior to death. In highly decomposed bodies, traditional samples may no longer be available. The vitreous humour from the eye may be used, as the fibrous layer of the eyeball and the eye socket of the skull protects the sample from trauma and adulteration. Other common organs used for toxicology are the brain, liver, and spleen.

== Detection and classification ==
Detection of drugs and pharmaceuticals in biological samples is usually done by an initial screening and then a confirmation of the compound(s), which may include a quantitation of the compound(s). The screening and confirmation are usually, but not necessarily, done with different analytical methods. Every analytical method used in forensic toxicology should be carefully tested by performing a validation of the method to ensure correct and indisputable results at all times. The choice of method for testing is highly dependent on what kind of substance one expects to find and the material on which the testing is performed. Customarily, a classification scheme is utilized that places poisons in categories such as: corrosive agents, gases and volatile agents, metallic poisons, non-volatile organic agents, and miscellaneous.

=== Immunoassays ===
Immunoassays require drawing blood and using the antibodies to find a reaction with substances such as drugs. The substances must be specific. It is the most common drug screening technique. Using the targeted drug the test will tell you if it is positive or negative to that drug. There can be 4 results when taking the test. Those results can be a true-positive, a false-negative, a false-positive, and a true-negative.

=== Gas chromatography-mass spectrometry ===
Gas chromatography-mass spectrometry (GC-MS) is a widely used analytical technique for the detection of volatile compounds. Ionization techniques most frequently used in forensic toxicology include electron ionization (EI) or chemical ionization (CI), with EI being preferred in forensic analysis due to its detailed mass spectra and its large library of spectra. However, chemical ionization can provide greater sensitivity for certain compounds that have high electron affinity functional groups.

=== Liquid chromatography-mass spectrometry ===
Liquid chromatography-mass spectrometry (LC-MS) has the capability to analyze compounds that are polar and less volatile. Derivatization is not required for these analytes as it would be in GC-MS, which simplifies sample preparation. As an alternative to immunoassay screening which generally requires confirmation with another technique, LC-MS offers greater selectivity and sensitivity. This subsequently reduces the possibility of a false negative result that has been recorded in immunoassay drug screening with synthetic cathinones and cannabinoids. A disadvantage of LC-MS on comparison to other analytical techniques such as GC-MS, is the high instrumentation cost. However, recent advances in LC-MS have led to higher resolution and sensitivity which assists in the evaluation of spectra to identify forensic analytes.

=== Detection of metals ===
The compounds suspected of containing a metal are traditionally analyzed by the destruction of the organic matrix by chemical or thermal oxidation. This leaves the metal to be identified and quantified in the inorganic residue, and it can be detected using such methods as the Reinsch test, emission spectroscopy or X-ray diffraction. Unfortunately, while this identifies the metals present it removes the original compound, and so hinders efforts to determine what may have been ingested. The toxic effects of various metallic compounds can vary considerably.

== See also ==
- Arsenic poisoning
- Drug test
