= Madeline House =

British scholar of English literature

Madeline House (née Church; 31 December 1903, Colombo – 27 February 1978, Huntingdon) was a British scholar of English literature, a specialist in the works of Charles Dickens, and known for her editorship of the Pilgrim edition of his letters. She was a winner of the British Academy's Rose Mary Crawshay Prize in 1965.

== Life ==
Madeline Edith Church was born in Colombo, Sri Lanka in 1903. She attended the Royal Holloway College, London. In 1933, she married Humphry House, a literary critic, with whom she began a new edition of the letters of Charles Dickens in 1949. Following his death, she took on the editorship, and worked with Kathleen Mary Tillotson on the project. Twelve volumes were planned.

The first volume of the letters came out in 1965, for which House received the Rose Mary Crawshay Prize. Two more volumes were published, and at the time of her death, she was readying the fourth volume.

The coverage of Dickens' correspondence was extensive and voluminous, leading one critic to complain that there was little separation of the dead wood from the letter that brought alive the marvellous young man in relation to his novels and journalism. Others, praised the effort as superb, saying that its scholarly annotations contributed a companion-picture to the boisterous 1840s. 250 previously unpublished letters were included in the second volume, which was called an exceptional scholarly text.

When the Houses began their editorial effort, around 12,000 letters were known. By time of volume V, another 1,452 had been discovered and documented.

Madeline House died in Huntingdon in 1978.

== Selected works ==
- The Letters of Charles Dickens. Volume I: 1820–1839. Clarendon. 1965.
- The Letters of Charles Dickens. Volume II: 1840–1841. Clarendon. 1969.
- The Letters of Charles Dickens. Volume III: 1842–1843. Clarendon. 1974.
