= All Saints Church, Acton =

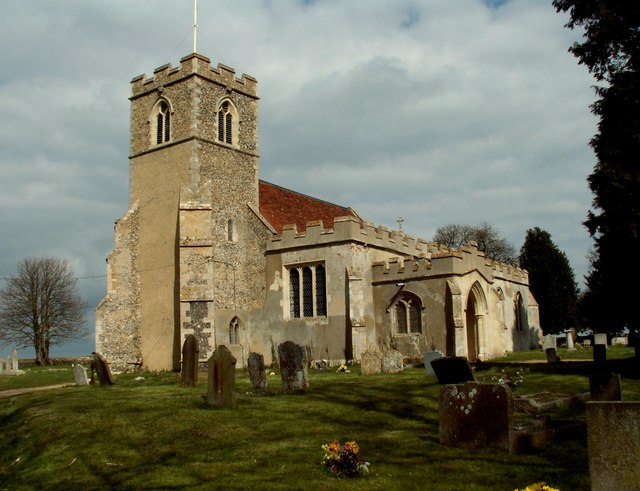
- All Saints Church, Acton
- OS grid reference: TL8922345230
- Location: Melford Road, Acton, Sudbury, Suffolk, CO10 0BA
- Country: England
- Denomination: Anglican
- Churchmanship: Central Anglican

History
- Status: Parish church

Architecture
- Heritage designation: Grade I
- Designated: 23 March 1961
- Architect: Whitworth Co-partnership
- Architectural type: Church
- Completed: Circa 12th Century

Administration
- Province: Canterbury
- Diocese: St Edmundsbury and Ipswich
- Archdeaconry: Sudbury
- Deanery: Sudbury
- Parish: Acton

All Saints Church is located in the village of Acton near Sudbury. It is an Anglican parish church in the deanery of Sudbury, part of the archdeaconry of Ipswich, and the Diocese of St Edmundsbury and Ipswich.

All Saints Church was listed at Grade I on 23 March 1961.

== Construction ==
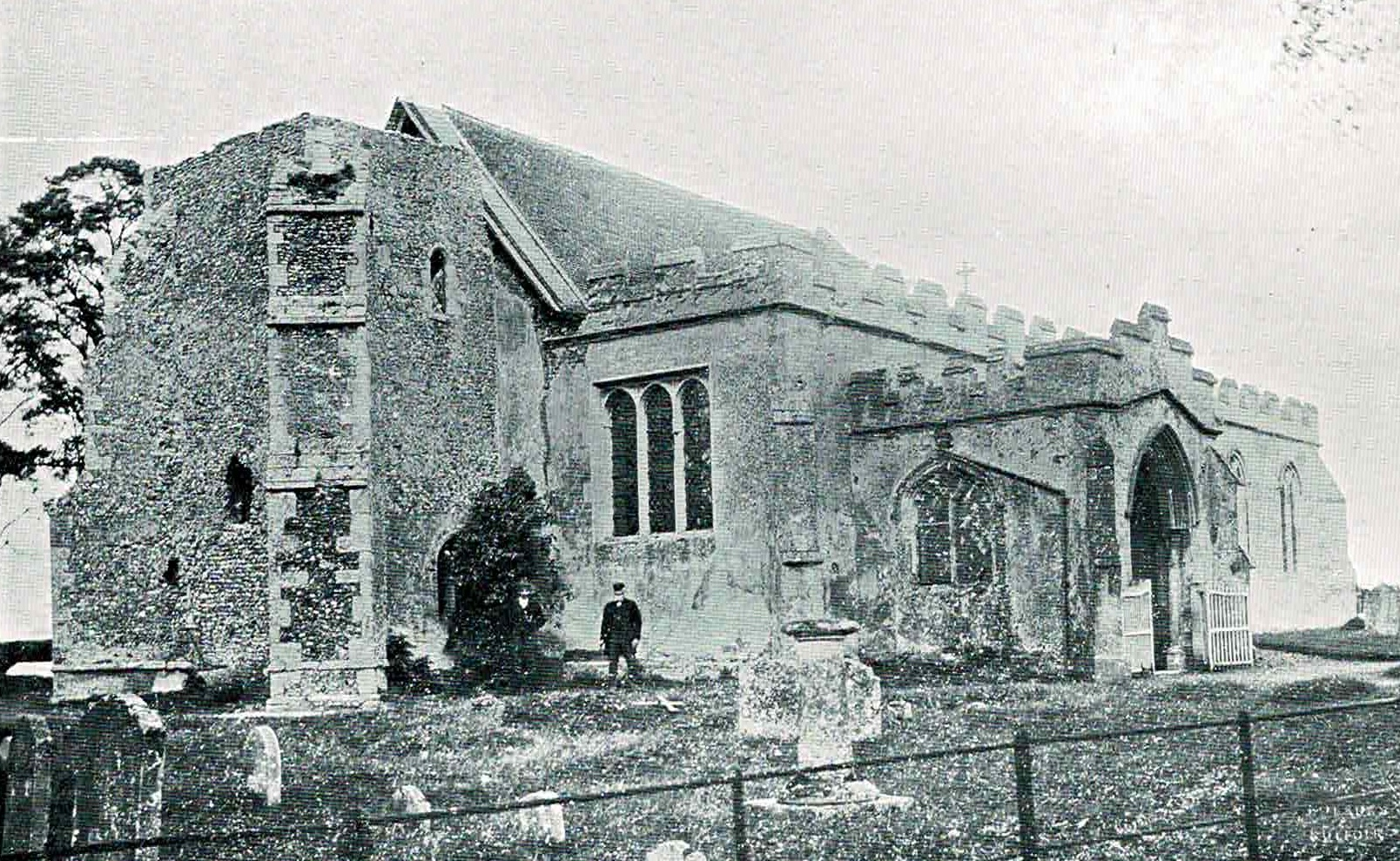
All Saints Church, Acton, 1907 before the tower was rebuilt

The Domesday Book mentions Acton as a church with 30 acres of land. The original building was constructed circa 1250. The south aisle of the church was constructed in the 15th century, and the upper part of the church tower was pulled down in the late 19th century for safety. The upper part was rebuilt 1913-23.

== Memorials ==
=== Brasses ===
All Saints' Church has a collection of monumental brasses, one of which of Robert de Bures is the oldest brass in Suffolk and third oldest in England, and which was described by the Victoria and Albert Museum as "the finest military brass in existence".

The collection of brasses includes Robert de Bures, Lady Alice Byran and Henry de Bures, as well as some smaller brasses created of later Byrans. The clothing of Robert de Bures in this Brass indicates that he was a knight of the Crusade in the last Crusade to the Holy Lands which took place in 1270. He is buried within All Saints Church, although his family doesn't appear to have held lands in Acton until his second marriage.

=== Jennans Memorial ===
The Jennans family vault was added with the south aisle in the 15th century. The memorial itself was added in the 1700s dedicated to Robert Jennans who died in 1732 and was Adjutant to the Duke of Marlborough, it features Robert Jennans and the allegorical figure of grief. Details of Both Robert Jennans and his son William Jennans are recorded on the memorial.

== Bells ==
The church has five bells, which were overhauled by Whitechapel Bell Foundry and rehung in 1926. The bells were founded between 1659 and 1747, with weights ranging between 4-1-4 and 8-1-4 cwt.

== Zeppelin ==
The church displays a WW1 bomb dropped by a Zeppelin on the Parish on August 7, 1916.

== See also ==
- Grade I listed buildings in Suffolk
