= Jarndyce and Jarndyce =

Fictional court case created by Charles Dickens

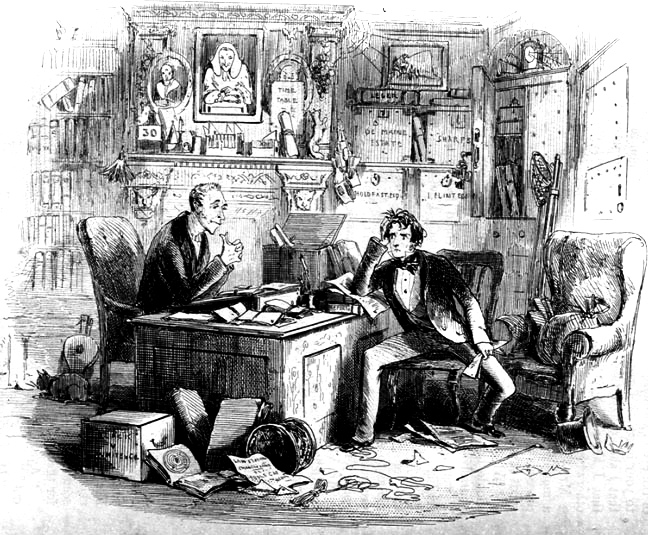
Illustration of the lawyer Vholes and his client Richard Carstone, one of the parties to the suit (illustration by Phiz)

Jarndyce and Jarndyce (also referred to as Jarndyce v Jarndyce (Note: Dickens refers to the case as "Jarndyce and Jarndyce", the way it would be spoken out loud. The v in the case title is an abbreviation of the Latin in versus, but is normally pronounced "and" for civil cases in England and Wales.)) is a fictional probate case in Bleak House (1852–1853) by Charles Dickens, progressing in the English Court of Chancery. The case is a central plot device in the novel and has become a byword for seemingly interminable legal proceedings.

== Plot ==
Jarndyce and Jarndyce concerns the fate of a large inheritance; due to the apparent existence of multiple wills and trusts deriving therefrom (with those containing multiple beneficiaries), the heir or heirs cannot be determined. The case has dragged on for many generations before the action of the novel, so that, by the end of the narrative when the correct heirs appear to have finally been established, legal costs have devoured the whole estate, rendering any ultimate verdict moot. Dickens used it to attack the chancery court system as being almost completely worthless, as any "honourable man among its practitioners" says, "Suffer any wrong that can be done you rather than come here!"

All of the main characters are connected in some way through the case, though the legal proceedings appear only as a background plot. Aside from the lawyers who sue and defend the case, every character who directly associates with it suffers some tragic fate. Miss Flite has long since lost her mind when the narrative begins. Richard Carstone, a former ward of court, dies trying to win the inheritance for himself after spending much of his life so distracted by the notion of it that he cannot commit to any other pursuit. John Jarndyce, by contrast, finds the whole process tiresome and tries to have as little to do with it as he possibly can, one of many examples of the character's wise and self-effacing demeanour.

Dickens introduces the case in the first chapter in terms which make the futility of the matter clear:

Jarndyce and Jarndyce drones on. This scarecrow of a suit has, over the course of time, become so complicated, that no man alive knows what it means. The parties to it understand it least; but it has been observed that no two Chancery lawyers can talk about it for five minutes without coming to a total disagreement as to all the premises. Innumerable children have been born into the cause; innumerable young people have married into it; innumerable old people have died out of it. Scores of persons have deliriously found themselves made parties in Jarndyce and Jarndyce without knowing how or why; whole families have inherited legendary hatreds with the suit. The little plaintiff or defendant, who was promised a new rocking-horse when Jarndyce and Jarndyce should be settled, has grown up, possessed himself of a real horse, and trotted away into the other world. Fair wards of court have faded into mothers and grandmothers; a long procession of Chancellors has come in and gone out.

The ending of the case reduces the whole court to fits of laughter. From Chapter 65:

We asked a gentleman by us, if he knew what cause was on? He told us Jarndyce and Jarndyce. We asked him if he knew what was doing in it? He said, really no he did not, nobody ever did; but as well as he could make out, it was over.

"Over for the day?" we asked him. "No", he said; "over for good."

Over for good!

When we heard this unaccountable answer, we looked at one another quite lost in amazement. Could it be possible that the Will had set things right at last, and that Richard and Ada were going to be rich? It seemed too good to be true. Alas, it was!

Our suspense was short; for a break up soon took place in the crowd, and the people came streaming out looking flushed and hot, and bringing a quantity of bad air with them. Still they were all exceedingly amused, and were more like people coming out from a Farce or a Juggler than from a court of Justice. We stood aside, watching for any countenance we knew; and presently great bundles of paper began to be carried out—bundles in bags, bundles too large to be got into any bags, immense masses of papers of all shapes and no shapes, which the bearers staggered under, and threw down for the time being, anyhow, on the Hall pavement, while they went back to bring out more. Even these clerks were laughing. We glanced at the papers, and seeing Jarndyce and Jarndyce everywhere, asked an official-looking person who was standing in the midst of them, whether the cause was over. "Yes," he said; "it was all up with it at last!" and burst out laughing too. ...

"Mr. Kenge," said Allan, appearing enlightened all in a moment. "Excuse me, our time presses. Do I understand that the whole estate is found to have been absorbed in costs?"

"Hem! I believe so," returned Mr. Kenge. "Mr. Vholes, what do you say?"

"I believe so," said Mr. Vholes.

"And that thus the suit lapses and melts away?"

"Probably," returned Mr. Kenge. "Mr. Vholes?"

"Probably," said Mr. Vholes.

== Real-life cases ==
In the preface to Bleak House, Dickens cites two Chancery cases as special inspirations, one of which was a "friendly suit":

At the present moment (August 1853) there is a suit before the court which was commenced nearly twenty years ago, in which from thirty to forty counsel have been known to appear at one time, in which costs have been incurred to the amount of seventy thousand pounds, which is a friendly suit, and which is (I am assured) no nearer to its termination now than when it was begun. There is another well-known suit in Chancery, not yet decided, which was commenced before the close of the last century and in which more than double the amount of seventy thousand pounds has been swallowed up in costs.

Based on an 1853 letter of Dickens, the first of these cases has been identified as the dispute over the will of Charles Day, a boot blacking manufacturer who died in 1836. Proceedings were commenced in 1837 and not concluded until at least 1854.

The second of these cases is generally identified as the dispute over the will of the "Acton Miser" William Jennens of Acton, Suffolk. Jennens v Jennens commenced in 1798 and was abandoned in 1915 (117 years later) when the legal fees had exhausted the Jennens estate of funds; thus it had been ongoing for 55 years when Bleak House was published.

Some commentators have theorised that the Jarndyce and Jarndyce case was inspired by the dispute over the will of Richard Smith, a West India merchant. When he died in 1776, the estate was tied up, and his daughter-in-law Charlotte Smith was pushed by financial necessity to write for money; she became a much-praised poet. That Chancery case has been reported to have taken 36 years to get through the court, although this may not be correct.

Another theory holds that the case is partly based on that of Wedderburn v Wedderburn, which ran from 1831 until 1857.

Others have cited the case of Thellusson v Woodford as the real-life basis but though it related to the will of a man who died in 1797 the suit was not actually filed until after the book was published.

The will of Sir George Downing, who stipulated that his fortune be used to build a new college at Cambridge, resulted in a lawsuit which lasted for more than 40 years, until March 1800.

== Cultural references ==
More than a century after the novel's publication, Jarndyce and Jarndyce continues to be used as an example of the futility and length of civil court cases. For example, Lord Denning, when referring to Midland Bank v Green, said, "The Green saga rivals in time and money the story of Jarndyce v Jarndyce."

In the Ampthill Peerage case, where a disputed claim to a peerage involved reopening issues which had seemingly been settled in a judgement delivered fifty years earlier, Lord Simon of Glaisdale spoke strongly of the need for finality in litigation. He reminded his fellow Law Lords that Jarndyce and Jarndyce, and the pitiful character of Miss Flite, driven mad by the strain of unending litigation, were inspired by real events.

By 2015, the case had been referred to nine times by the U.S. Supreme Court and over 333 times by state and federal courts. It is referred to (indirectly by reference to Bleak House) in the United States Supreme Court case Stern v. Marshall, a protracted lawsuit over an estate.

In the film version of Virginia Woolf's novel Orlando, a court case concerning Orlando's right to his/her estate begun during the reign of Queen Anne (1702–1714) is completed during the reign of Queen Elizabeth II (1952–2022). The length of the case is made humorous by the fact that Orlando, a party to the lawsuit, remains alive for its entire duration.

The case is mentioned in David Graeber's 2018 book Bullshit Jobs as a paradigm of long-lasting court disputes which bespeak the self-serving desire of problem-solving professionals (not only lawyers but also independent auditors and financial advisers) to prolong and multiply otherwise solvable problems as a way to preserve their jobs. The 1852 case was remembered in the context of the 2006 payment protection insurance (PPI) scandal in the United Kingdom, for which "banks were found to have been unloading unwanted and often wildly disadvantageous account insurance policies on their clients." According to Graeber, "the result was an entire new industry organized around resolving PPI claims," leading banks to enter into contracts with professionals and firms intent on making sure the problem was never actually solved, because they eyed the "vast sums set aside by the bank to pay compensation for the PPI".

== See also ==
- Justice delayed is justice denied
