= Clapham, Gloucester =

District of the City of Gloucester, England

Coordinates: 51.869°N 2.241°W

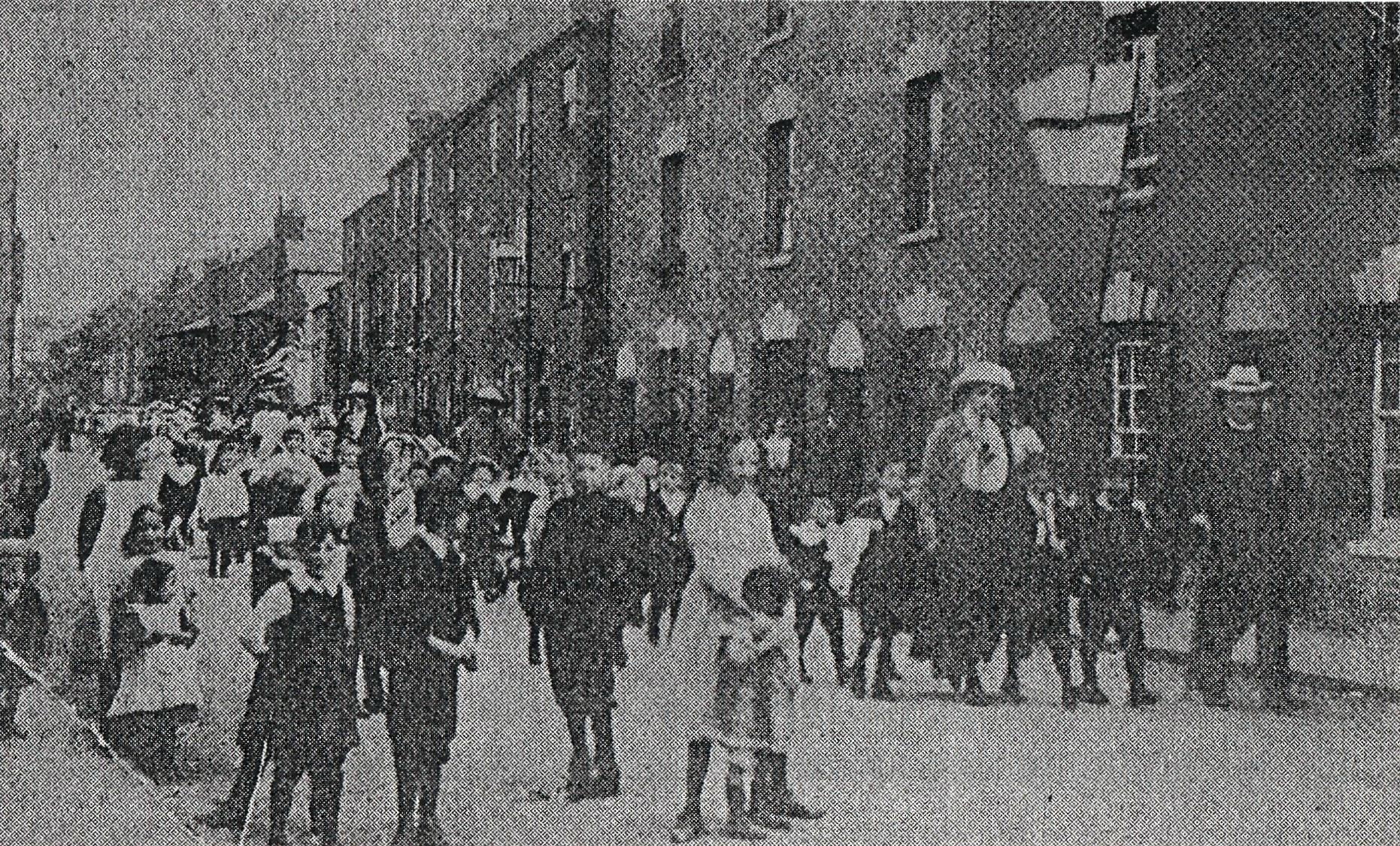
St George's Day parade along Sweetbriar Street, 1912

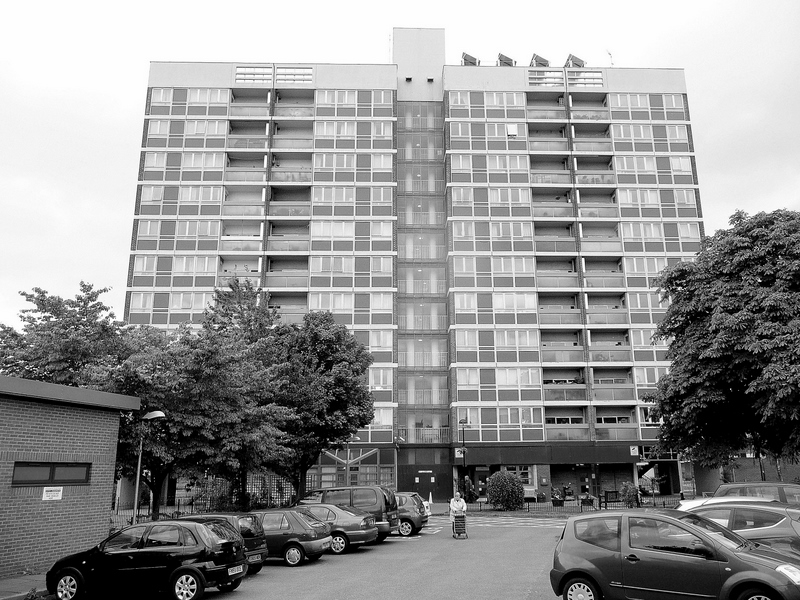
Tower block in Alvin Street, part of the modern development that replaced Clapham.

Clapham was a district of the City of Gloucester that was developed from 1822 by George Worrall Counsel who built several hundred houses for artisans. It included Worrall Street and Counsel Street, neither of which now exist. The area was redeveloped in the twentieth century and is now part of Kingsholm.

== See also ==
- Worcester Street
