= George Rowe (printmaker) =

English printmaker and lithographer

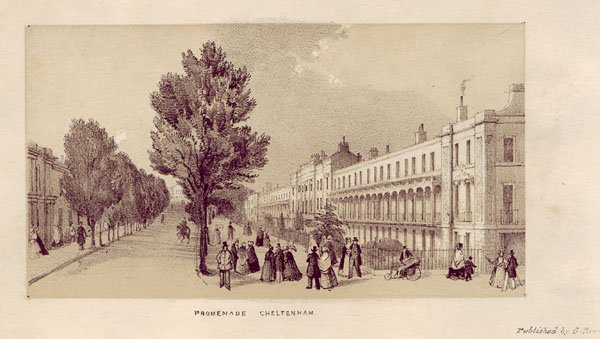
A typical Rowe Cheltenham print

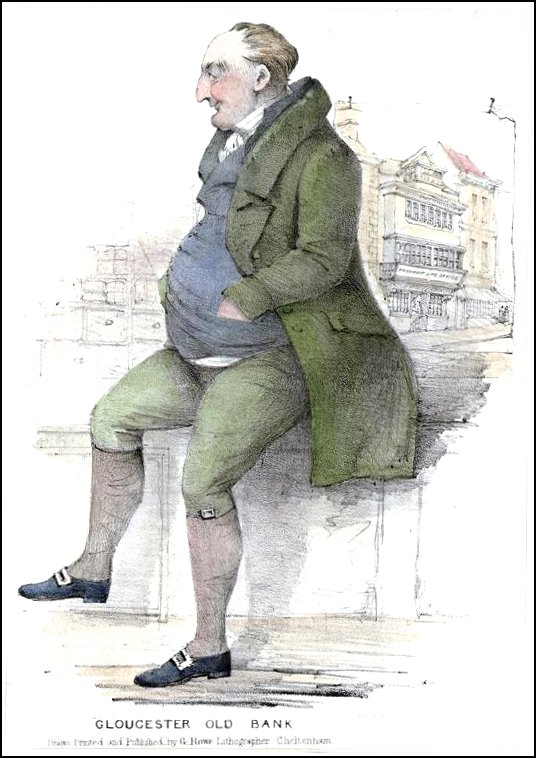
A print by George Rowe depicting Jemmy Wood with the Gloucester Old Bank in the background

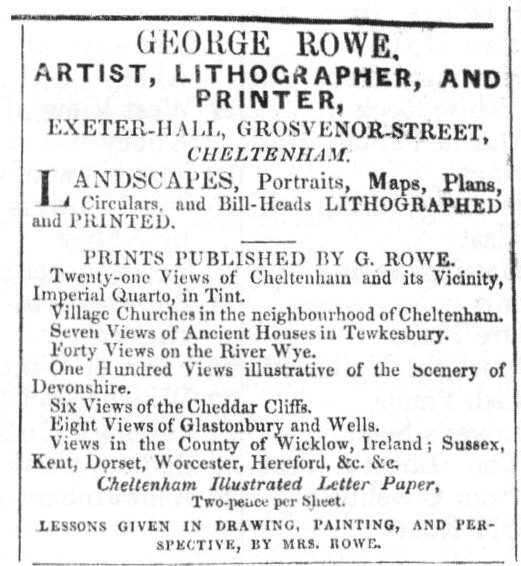
An 1830s newspaper advert for Rowe.

George Rowe (1796 – 2 September 1864) was a Cheltenham printmaker, lithographer and businessman who spent some time in Australia prospecting for gold after he experienced business difficulties in Cheltenham.

== Early life ==
Rowe was born at Exeter in 1796 and was baptised on 8 July 1796 at St Sidwell's Parish Church, Exeter, son of George and Elizabeth Rowe. He initially worked as a drawing master, being first recorded as such at Hastings in 1823. He produced his first known topographical prints, Twenty-six Views of Picturesque Scenery of Hastings and its Vicinity, at Hastings in 1823. He produced many views of Sussex, Kent, Exeter, Devon, Plymouth and of local seaside resorts, including Sidmouth, Torquay and Lynton. He was said to have met his future wife, Philippa Curtis, at Lynton. She was the daughter of a major in the British Army.

== Cheltenham ==
Rowe, his wife and two children, moved to Cheltenham in 1832 or 1834, possibly to escape a cholera outbreak in Exeter, and he became an important figure in the town's life over the next twenty years. With his wife, he gave lessons in drawing and painting, and sold artists materials and prints of Cheltenham and other towns. He published two editions of The Illustrated Cheltenham Guide, for which he produced the illustrations, and carried on a printing business.

Rowe became involved in Cheltenham civic life, serving on committees and becoming High Bailiff of the Manor of Cheltenham. He was a founder member of the Cheltenham Liberal Association, and was the joint owner and publisher with George Norman of the Cheltenham Examiner newspaper. He became a director of the Bayshill Estate Building Company and joint owner of the Royal Well spa.

== Australia ==
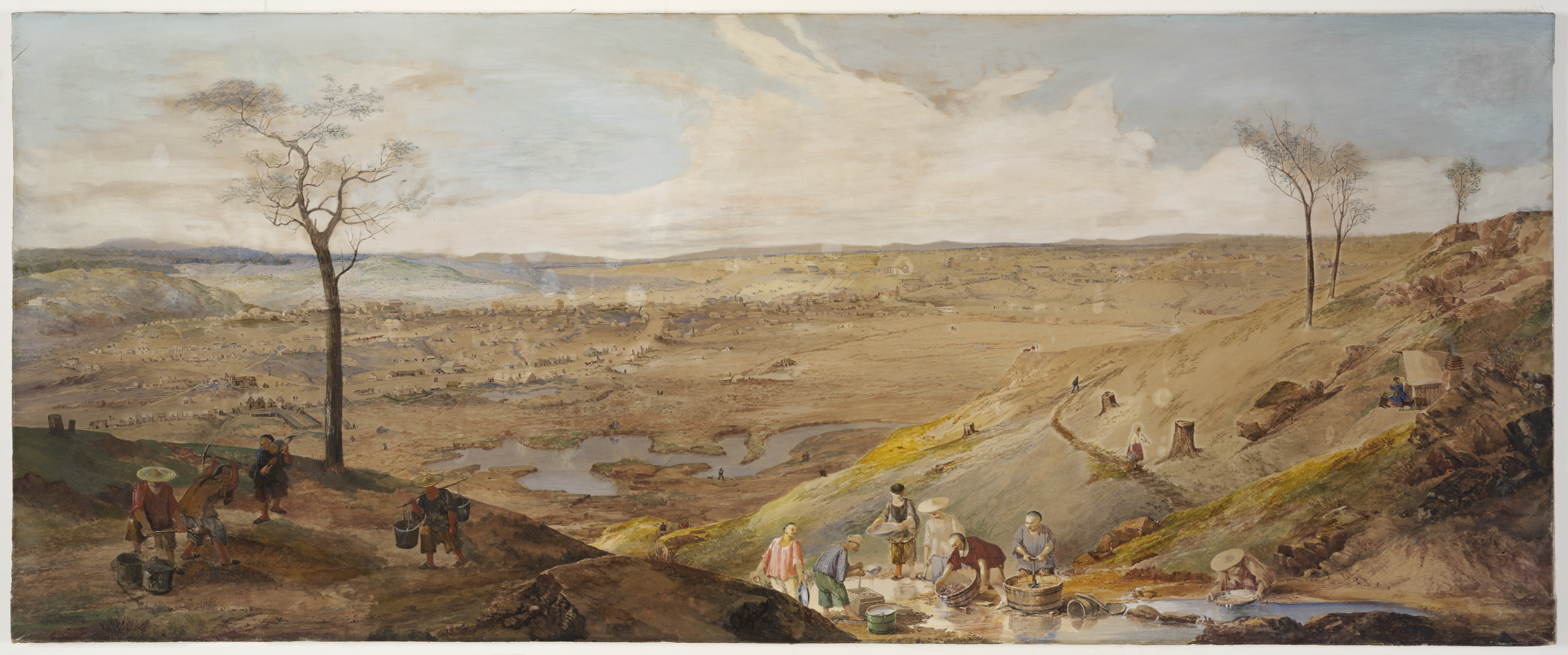
Bird's-eye view of Ballarat, Victoria, Australia, 1858, by George Rowe

By 1852 Rowe's business activities were in difficulties and he left Cheltenham for the Australian goldfields in June where he spent about seven years. He arrived at the Bendigo gold diggings in 1853 and his eldest son George joined him in November. In 1854 he was joined by his two younger sons Thomas and Sandford. He was not successful as prospector, nor as a shopkeeper at Long Gully, Bendigo, but found success in Australia by creating water colours of the Bendigo and Castlemaine gold diggings. His works were exhibited at Bendigo in 1857, and in 1858 he created a well known panoramic View of the City of Melbourne from the Observatory. He returned to Britain in 1858 or 1859 and settled in Exeter where he prepared a series of views of Australia and Tasmania for which he won a gold medal at the London 1862 International Exhibition. A number of Rowe's works were purchased by Sir William Dixson and are now held in the Dixson Wing of the State Library of New South Wales.

== Death ==
Rowe died at Heavitree, Exeter, on 2 September 1864. He was survived by his wife, five sons and five daughters.

== Publications ==
- Illustrations of Cheltenham and its Vicinity, circa 1840.
- Rowe's Illustrated Cheltenham Guide, 1845 & 1850.
