= Letters of Charles Dickens =

Letters written by Charles Dickens

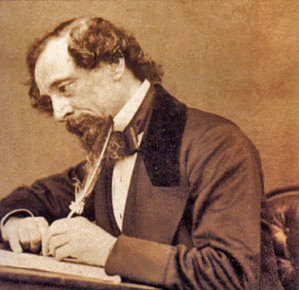
Dickens at his desk

The letters of Charles Dickens, of which more than 14,000 are known, range in date from about 1821, when Dickens was 9 years old, to 8 June 1870, the day before he died. They have been described as "invariably idiosyncratic, exuberant, vivid, and amusing…widely recognized as a significant body of work in themselves, part of the Dickens canon". They were written to family, friends, and the contributors to his literary periodicals, who included many of the leading writers of the day. Their letters to him were almost all burned by Dickens because of his horror at the thought of his private correspondence being laid open to public scrutiny. The reference edition of Dickens's letters is the 12-volume Pilgrim Edition, edited by Graham Storey et al. and published by Oxford University Press.

== Dickens as a letter-writer ==
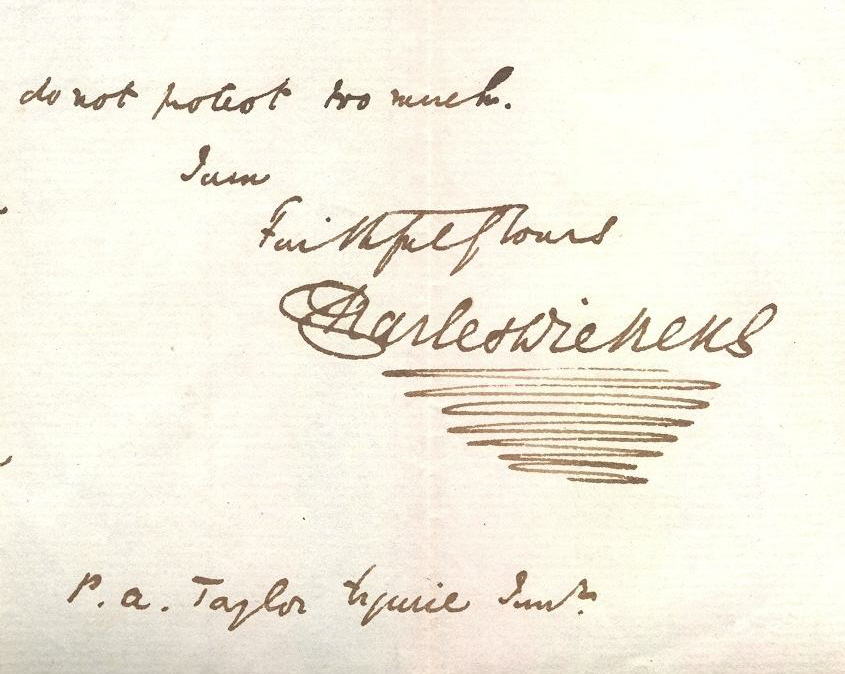
Dickens's signature from a letter, incorporating his personal flourish

Dickens received, by his own count, 60 to 80 letters every day, and when pressure of work permitted he replied to them without delay. For most of his life he did not employ a secretary but conducted his correspondence himself. Exceptions were made for begging letters, which his sister-in-law Georgina Hogarth answered, and for routine business connected with his two magazines, Household Words and All the Year Round, which was handled by his assistant editor W. H. Wills, although Dickens preferred to correspond with the contributors himself. He wrote with a goose quill rather than a steel pen, and at first used black ink (now aged to brown), switching in the late 1840s to blue ink on blue paper. His biographer Fitzgerald described his handwriting as "so 'prompt', so alert, finished and full of purpose and decision; legible also, but requiring familiarity and training to read". He often ended his signature with an exuberant flourish, which became a kind of trademark.

== His correspondents ==
Dickens's correspondents spanned the whole social scale of 19th century England from reformed street prostitutes to Queen Victoria herself. They included family members, of course, and Dickens's publishers; writers like Robert Browning, Thomas Carlyle, Wilkie Collins, George Eliot, John Forster, Alfred Tennyson (not yet ennobled), and William Makepeace Thackeray; the artists Clarkson Stanfield and Daniel Maclise; and the actor William Macready. Letters to several of his friends have little or no representation in the surviving correspondence because they were destroyed by the recipients, their heirs, or by random accidents of history. These correspondents include his daughter Katey, Augustus Egg, Chauncy Hare Townshend, Hablot K. Browne ("Phiz"), Richard Barham, James Muspratt, and his lover Ellen Ternan.

== Subject matter ==
The letters are the only extended autobiographical writing by Dickens that has survived. Attempts at writing a diary seldom lasted long and for the most part the manuscripts are lost, while a memoir of his childhood was discontinued and converted into some of the early chapters of David Copperfield. The letters therefore give the most immediate and vivid expression of Dickens's life as seen by himself, even though they rarely examine his interior life. They give a unique insight into the way Dickens's processes of composition worked as he wrestled with the novels he published and considered others which were never written, such as the "book whereof the whole story shall be on the top of the Great St. Bernard". Dickens's almost constant travelling is also reflected. George Gissing wrote that "If he makes a tour in any part of the British Isles, he writes a full description of all he sees, of everything that happens, and writes it with such gusto, such mirth, such strokes of fine picturing, as appear in no other private letters ever given to the public." The range of subject-matter of the letters is described by his editor, Jenny Hartley:

Scotland, Paris, and Venice ... child exploitation, Ragged Schools, and soup kitchens ... the Great Exhibition, women smoking, and dresses for reformed prostitutes ... ravens, waistcoats, and recipes for punch ... mesmerism and dreams ... terrible acting and wonderful children's birthday parties".

== Manuscripts ==
Dickens's early sensational success as the author of The Pickwick Papers induced many people to keep any letters he might send them. This, along with his huge output of letters, ensured that many thousands have survived. In 1965 the editors of his letters reckoned them to number nearly 12,000; by 2002 they had amended the total to 14,252. Though some letters are in private hands, most are now in libraries and public institutions. The largest collection is held by the Charles Dickens Museum in London, the second largest by the Victoria and Albert Museum, and the third largest by the Morgan Library & Museum in New York; other extensive collections are held by the British Library, the New York Public Library, the Huntington Library, and the Free Library of Philadelphia.

In contrast, few letters to Dickens are known. Dickens often expressed his opposition to the publication of private letters, and was determined to suffer from it himself as little as possible. He burned those letters that had been sent to him in a mass bonfire in 1860, commenting, "Would to God that every letter I had ever written was on that pile". He burned more in 1869, the year before he died. As a result, hardly more than 250 letters to Dickens have survived to the present day.

== Editions ==
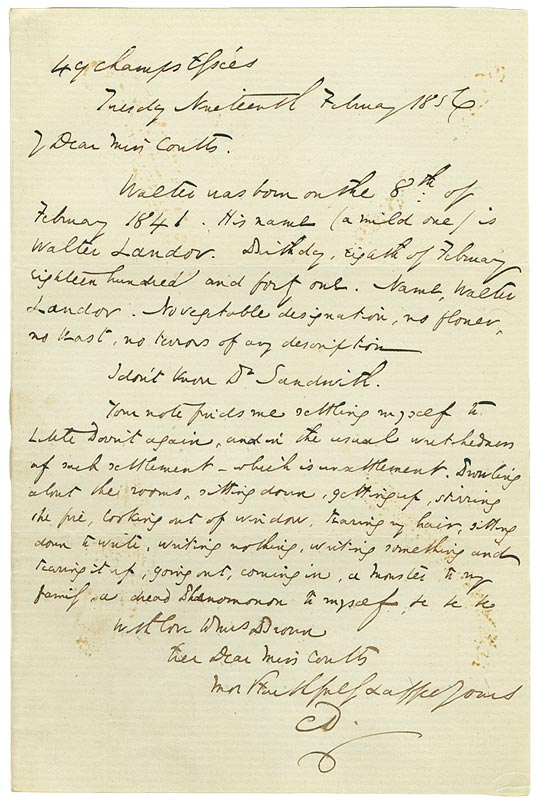
A letter to Angela Burdett-Coutts, written from the Champs-Élysées, Paris in 1856

The reading public's first chance to study large numbers of Dickens letters came shortly after his death with the publication of The Life of Charles Dickens (1872–74) by his lifelong friend John Forster. Many of Dickens's letters to Forster were included, but they were heavily and rather misleadingly edited to make Forster seem a more central figure in Dickens's life than he had always been.

In 1878 it was announced that a collection of Dickens's letters would be edited by his sister-in-law, Georgina Hogarth. In collaboration with Dickens's eldest daughter Mary she duly produced The Letters of Charles Dickens in three volumes, which were published by Chapman & Hall between 1880 and 1882. A second edition in two volumes followed in 1882, and a third in one volume, published by Macmillan, in 1893. Altogether they included roughly a thousand letters; but many were heavily cut for reasons of taste, and some were created by cut-and-pasting together extracts from several different letters in a way which was considered unacceptable even by late-Victorian standards.

1938 saw the publication in three volumes of almost 6,000 of the letters, edited by Walter Dexter as part of the Nonesuch Edition of Dickens's Works. This was an expensively-priced edition limited to 877 copies, and was therefore not easily accessible to the ordinary reader unless he had either ample means or access to a university library. Moreover, Dexter's editorial practices were far from rigorous: there was hardly any annotation, and many of the letters were simply copied from previous editions rather than from the originals, with the inevitable result that the texts were not always accurate.

In 1949 the publisher Rupert Hart-Davis set a new edition in motion, with a grant of £6000 from the Pilgrim Trust and the Dickens scholar Humphry House in place as editor. In 1955, with almost 10,000 letters transcribed, House died unexpectedly. His widow Madeline House took over the project in collaboration with the critic Graham Hough, though Graham Storey soon took over Hough's role. The first volume of the Pilgrim Trust Edition, as it was named, was eventually published by Oxford University Press under their Clarendon Press imprint in 1965, and 11 more volumes appeared periodically, the last one in 2002. The editorial team changed over the years, with Madeline House, Graham Storey, Kathleen Tillotson, K. J. Fielding, Nina Burgis and Angus Easson all being named as editor at various points. The British Academy took over the financing of the project, and from 1995 it was renamed the British Academy – Pilgrim Trust Edition. An electronic version of the edition has been published by InteLex Past Masters. The Pilgrim Edition includes some 14,000 letters addressed to 2,500 known correspondents and to more than 200 unnamed and unidentifiable ones. Not all of the originals of these letters can be found; some are printed from short extracts in sale catalogues and similar sources, and some are only known from mentions of their existence in other letters. Dickens's biographer Claire Tomalin reported that "Each volume of this edition wins acclaim as it appears, and it is right that it should do so"; one such critic thought that "it brings Dickens so close you can almost smell the cigar smoke". Dissenting voices have been few, and though Joel J. Brattin noted that there were some errors and omissions of transcription he endorsed it as being in general extremely accurate, and thought the project as a whole "of incomparable value".

New Dickens letters are discovered at the rate of about 20 per year, and they were for some years edited and published in Supplements to the Pilgrim Edition in The Dickensian, the journal of the Dickens Fellowship. They have also been made accessible online by the Charles Dickens Letters Project, and it is intended eventually to publish a supplementary volume to the Pilgrim Edition.

== Selections ==
The costliness of both the Nonesuch and Pilgrim volumes, and the fragmentary or routine business nature of many of the letters included, has encouraged the publication of selections of Dickens's letters, intended for the general reader rather than the scholar. In 1985 David Paroissien edited Selected Letters of Charles Dickens, taking his texts from the Nonesuch Edition, substantive textual variants from the first five volumes of the Pilgrim Edition (the only ones then published) being listed in the notes. The scholar John Espey wrote that this selection constitutes "a full review of almost all that we know of Dickens's activities as editor, public figure, father, husband, lecturer and lover", and that it "should satisfy for some time both the general reader and the specialist".

In 2012, Dickens's bicentenary year, Jenny Hartley edited a one-volume selection from the Pilgrim Edition. Claire Harman, writing in the Times Literary Supplement, welcomed it with enthusiasm, while noting the sparse annotation and the fact that Hartley had chosen a representative selection of the letters, including a few rather trivial ones, rather than "a series of epistolary knock-out blows". Boyd Tonkin, in the Independent, found it to be "edited with unobtrusive intelligence and insight", Joyce Carol Oates thought it "more revealing and more intimate than any biography", and the critic Nicholas Lezard recommended it in the Guardian with the words, "The whole book bursts with the author’s energy, and you will love him and know him better after reading even a few of these letters."

Also in 2012, a 4-hour audiobook was issued by Naxos under the title Charles Dickens: A Portrait in Letters, the readers being David Timson and Simon Callow. One reviewer wrote that they "create myriad personalities with varying accents, tones, class distinctions, and personal idiosyncrasies that are nearly flawless".
