= Gloucester Old Bank =

British bank

Coordinates: 51.865918750937325°N 2.246550903607915°W

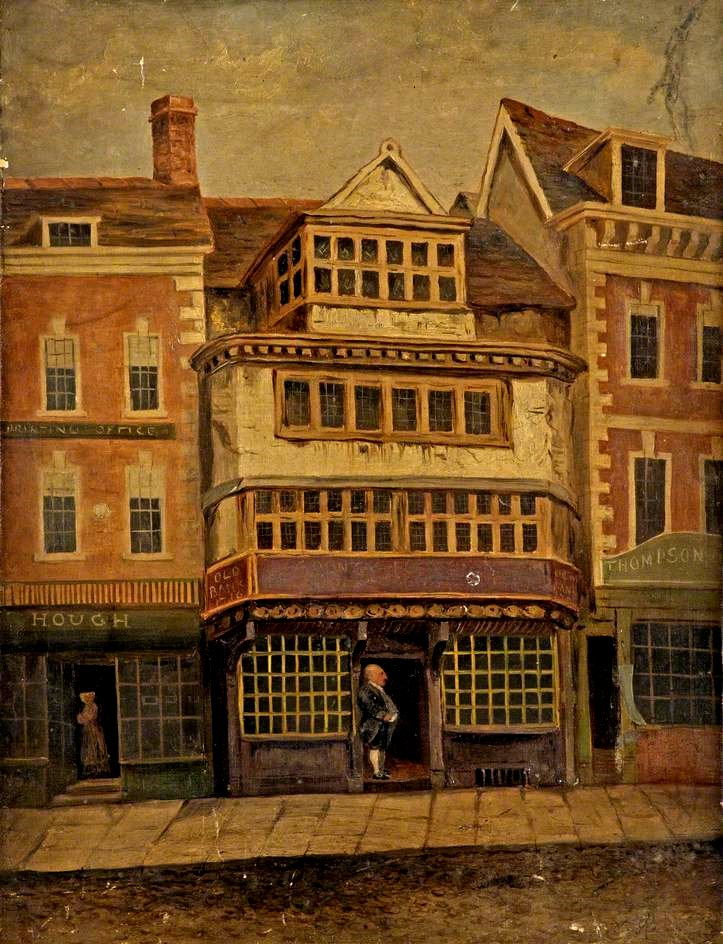
An 1828 painting of the bank by J.R. Orton after a print by George Rowe of Cheltenham. The figure in the doorway is almost certainly intended to be Jemmy Wood. In the collection of Gloucester City Museum & Art Gallery.

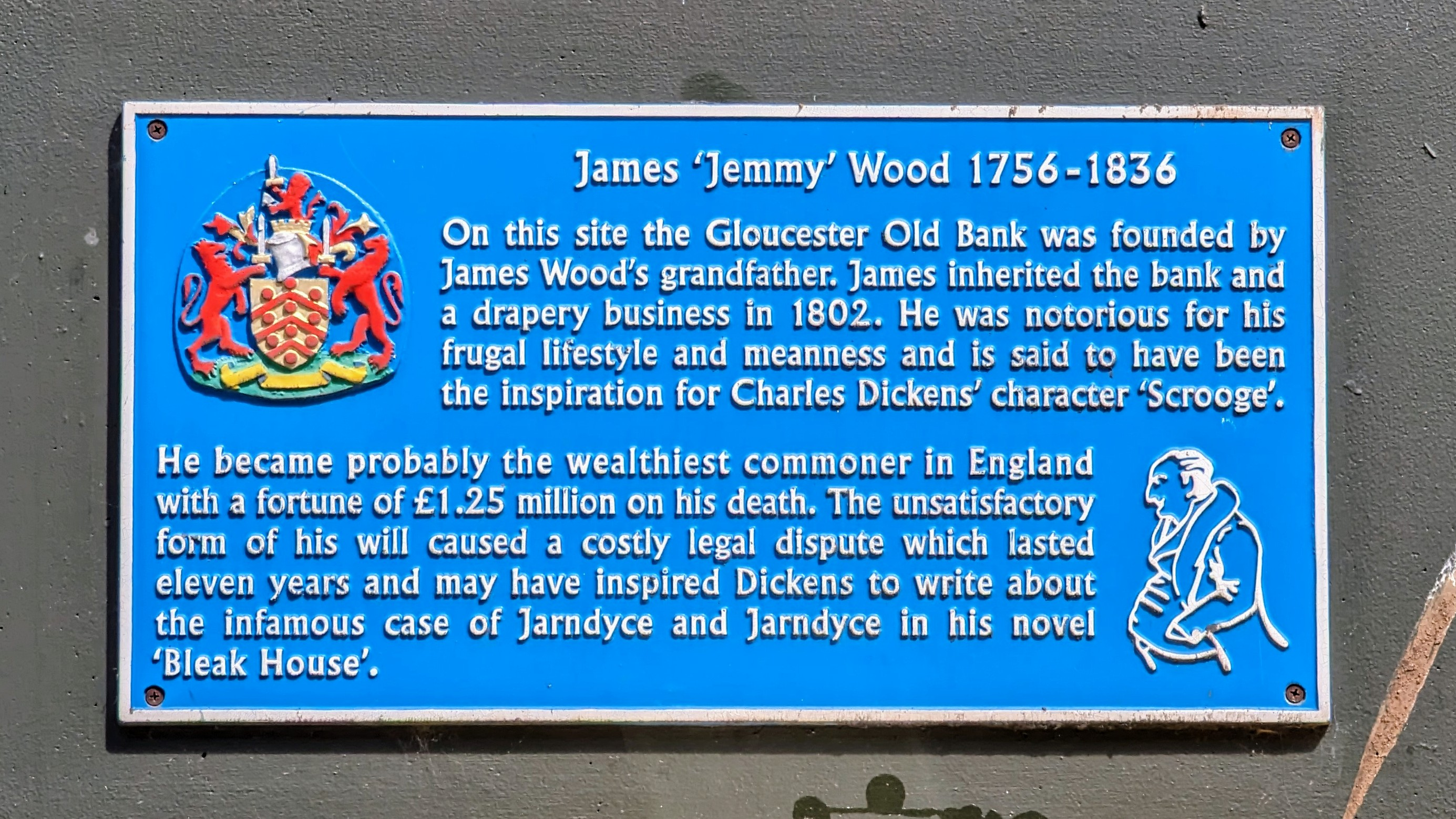
Plaque marking Gloucester Old Bank site

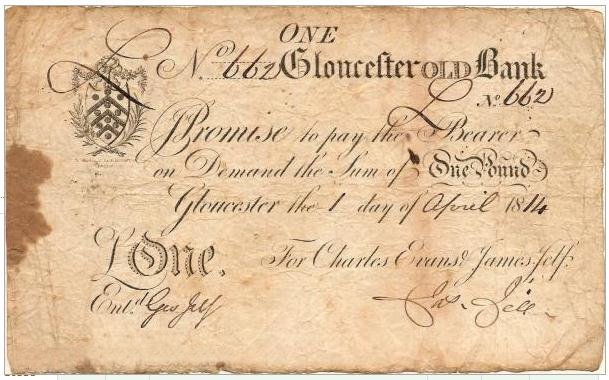
An 1814 banknote from Gloucester Old Bank.

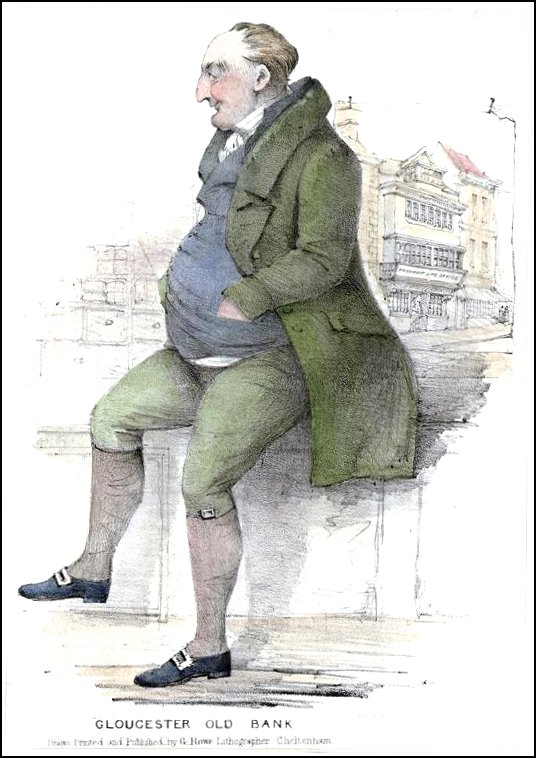
A print by George Rowe depicting Jemmy Wood with the Gloucester Old Bank in the background.

The Gloucester Old Bank was a British bank that operated between 1716 and 1838. It was founded in 1716 by James Wood. The bank was said to have been the oldest private bank in Britain, having survived the financial consequences of the Napoleonic Wars when many other banks went out of business. The claim is wrong as both C. Hoare & Co. and Child & Co. were founded earlier; the Gloucester Old Bank was, however, one of the oldest banks in Britain in the nineteenth century.

At some point in the nineteenth century the bank became the Gloucester City Old Bank. In 1838 it was taken over by the County of Gloucestershire Banking Company which eventually became part of Lloyds Bank.

== Apotheosis ==
After the death of the first James Wood, the bank passed to his son Richard Wood and on his death in 1802 to James (Jemmy) Wood, who was also known as the Gloucester Miser.

The bank reached its apotheosis under Jemmy, whose practice was to offer no interest on deposits of less than one year. At that time, the whole bank was believed to have consisted of just Jemmy and two clerks. Counterfeit coins were nailed to the counter as a warning to customers not to try to pass them off on the bank.

== Premises ==
The bank premises were a medieval timber building at 22 Westgate Street, Gloucester that remained until the nineteenth century, and consisted of a counter within a larger draper's shop. The old building once occupied by the bank was subsequently replaced with a Victorian Gothic building and more recently with a new building. It is now occupied by a McDonald's restaurant.

== Demise ==
The bank was taken over by the County of Gloucestershire Banking Company in 1838, which eventually became part of Lloyds Bank in 1897.

== Similar banks ==
The bank was just one of several small banks in Gloucester including the similarly named Old Bank of James Jelf, William Fendall and Charles Evans, which failed in 1815, and the Gloucester Bank which was owned by John Merrol Stephens. Many provincial British towns had their own banks in the eighteenth and nineteenth centuries but their notes were usually only good in their home town.

== See also ==
- Jemmy Wood
