= Charles Day (boot blacking manufacturer) =

British industrialist

Charles Day (1782/3–25 October 1836) was a British industrialist who was co-founder and then sole proprietor of the Day and Martin boot blacking company, founded around 1801 in partnership with Benjamin Martin (c. 1774–1834).

It is said that the "Real Japan Blacking" "Black Diamond" formula was originally obtained in return for a favour from a soldier in Doncaster by Benjamin Martin's brother-in-law (or his father in another version). Benjamin Martin took the formula to London where he worked as a hairdresser with Charles Day's father. Martin and the Days then began manufacturing and selling the product. Business grew rapidly and by the end of 1805 Day and Martin had acquired new premises at 97 High Holborn. Day bought out Martin for £10,000 in 1808. Some versions of the story suggest Charles Day was also initially a hairdresser, but in 1835 the company stated he had only ever been in the blacking business.

The Day and Martin company is an early illustration of the power of advertising and marketing. It is reported they promoted the product by hiring large numbers of men wearing suits to ask for it in shops around London. The company also features in company law because they had to take legal action against numerous copiers and counterfeiters. One of these, after Day's death, was his own nephew, William Charles Day.

Charles Day married Rebecca Peake at Stafford St. Mary's on 6 September 1806. They had one daughter, Letitia Caroline (c. 1808–1877), known as Caroline, who when young was a sought-after heiress until she eloped with Horatio Clagett (or Claggett), a well-known "playboy" and serial bankrupt, in 1832. Charles Day's will reveals he also fathered three "natural" sons, almost certainly Henry, Alfred and Edmund Price.

Charles Day left a fortune of between £350,000 and £450,000 (£53.2 million in modern pounds). His will mentions his main residence as Harley House, Regent's Park. He also owned a country house at Edgware, remembered for its lodge in the shape of a boot blacking bottle. One bequest of £100,000 founded a charity for the blind. He also built alms houses at Edgware. His will, with five codicils, one of them invalid made just before his death, was heavily contested for several years, incurring huge legal costs. This real case is believed to have been an inspiration for the interminable dispute of Jarndyce and Jarndyce in Dickens's novel Bleak House.

Day's widow Rebecca lived on at Edgware with her daughter and son-in-law until her death in 1843.
