= William Jennens =

English financier (1701–1798)

William Jennens (possibly Jennings) (1701–1798), also known as William the Miser, William the Rich, and The Miser of Acton, was a reclusive financier who lived at Acton Place in the village of Acton, Suffolk, England. He was described as the "richest commoner in England" when he died unmarried and intestate with a fortune estimated at £2 million, which became the subject of legal wrangles (Jennens v Jennens) in the Court of Chancery for well over a century despite the fact that all Jennens' real and personal estate had been distributed to his closest living relatives in a relatively short time after his death. The Jennens case is often cited as having provided inspiration for Jarndyce v Jarndyce in Charles Dickens' serialised novel Bleak House.

== Biography ==
William was born in 1701 to Ann(e) (née Guidott 1675, daughter of Carew Guidott(i)) and Robert Jennens (Jennings), who were married in Westminster Abbey in 1700. Robert was aide-de-camp to John Churchill, 1st Duke of Marlborough. William's godfather was King William III.

Robert Jennens bought Acton Place from the Daniels, a recusant Catholic family, in 1708 and continuously remodeled it in the Palladian style until he died in 1725. William abandoned all rebuilding and lived in unfurnished rooms in the basement with his servants and dogs, eschewing visitors and social contact.

William conducted his business in London, including lending to gamblers in the casinos. Thus he acquired his name and reputation as a miser whilst accruing his fortune. Nevertheless, he was a cultured man, serving as governor to the London Foundling Hospital, serving as a benefactor of the Emmanuel Society, which supported the blind, and subscribing to books, including Jeremiah Seed's Discourses (1743) and James Ogilvie's Sermons (1786).

He was appointed High Sheriff of Suffolk in 1754 (or 1756).

== Death and beyond ==
William died on 19 June 1798 and his body was interred in the family vault beside his father and mother.

He was described as Britain's richest man at the time of his death. His estate was said to be worth over £2 million (though it was probably closer to £1.1 million), producing an annual income of about £40,000. The Times of 20 July 1798 published a tabulated list of his worth as capital of £432,509 and annual interest of £119,415.

The Gentleman's Magazine, and Historical Chronicle reported in 1798 that:

A will was found in his coat-pocket, sealed, but not signed; which was owing, as his favourite servant says, to his master leaving his spectacles at home when he went to his solicitor for the purpose of duly executing it, and which he afterwards forgot to do.

His obituary read:

Died, 19 June, in his 97th year, Wm. Jennens, of Acton Place, near Long Melford, in the county of Suffolk, and of Grosvenor Square, Esq. He was baptized in September 1701, and was the son of Robert Jennens, Esq., Aide-de-Camp to great Duke of Marlborough (by Anne, his wife, and daughter of Carew Guidott, Esq., lineally descended from Sir Anthony Guidott, Knight, a noble Florentine, employed on sundry embassies by King Edward VI), grandson of Humphrey Jennens of Edington Hall, in the county of Warwick, Esq., Lord of the Manor of Nether Whitacre in that county in 1680 and an eminent ironmaster of Birmingham. King William III was godfather to late Mr. Jennens.

=== Court decisions ===
Initially the Court of Chancery declared that the heir to his fortune was George Augustus William Curzon, a descendant of his aunt Hester Jennens. Curzon's mother, Sophia Charlotte Howe, administered the estate on his behalf but when he died young she passed it to her second son, Richard William Penn Curzon (1796–1870), who was later alleged to have been the illegitimate son of an unmarried woman named Ann Oake.

The courts allocated Jennens's personal property between his next of kin, Mary, Lady Andover, a granddaughter of Humphrey Jennens's daughter Ann, and William Lygon, 1st Earl Beauchamp (1747–1816), a grandson of Hester Jennens, and a descendant of Thomas Lygon.

William's uncle William Jennens (15 November 1676), the youngest son of Humphrey Jennens and Mary Milford, was a British Army officer in the American Indian Wars. If he was the William Jennings who married Mary Jane Pulliam, then many Americans were coheirs, including their famous great-grandson, U.S. Senator and Secretary of State Henry Clay (1777–1852). Litigation on behalf of the American descendants commenced around 1850 and every descendant of anybody named "Jennings" was solicited. The accumulation of funds for litigation was initiated in England, but his Virginia descendants contributed large sums and even unrelated individuals named "Jennings" sent money in the hope of sharing the inheritance.

== Jennings clubs ==
Starting in 1849, the Jennens fortune became so notorious that clubs were formed of people descended from Jennens and Jennings, who would hire agents to do genealogical research and file lawsuits in Britain. Such clubs are known to have existed in Great Barr, Birmingham, UK; Nashville, Tennessee; Walpole, New Hampshire; Connecticut; New Jersey; Virginia; and Ireland, among many other places. It has been suggested that more than £100,000 was spent on research and retaining legal counsel. By the time these clubs were formed, the statute of limitations for claiming the fortune had already passed, unless fraud could be proven.

The last claim failed in 1915. Unofficial claims in the media persisted for some decades thereafter.

== Bleak House by Charles Dickens ==
Charles Dickens published Bleak House between March 1852 and September 1853, where a key plot device was the ongoing legal case Jarndyce v Jarndyce which exhibited some similarities to the Jennens case although differed in its fundamental, being that the fortune of Jarndyce, held in Chancery, was exhausted by its multiple claimants whereas William Jennens fortune was distributed to his beneficiaries and remained untouched by its many optimistic litigants.
