= Acton, Suffolk =

Coordinates: 52.07071°N 0.76102°E

Acton
- Village and civil parish
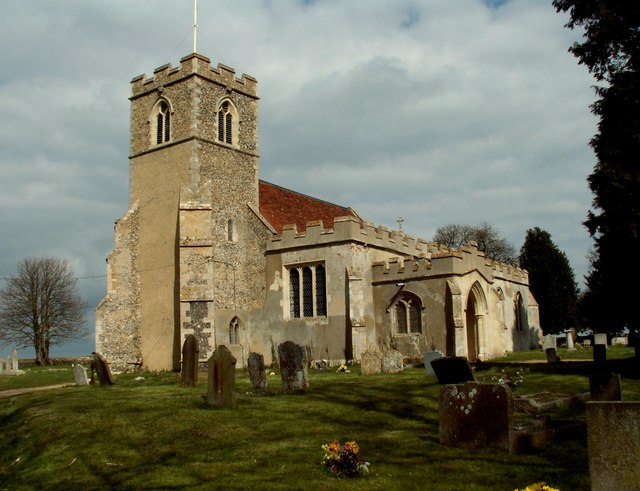
- All Saints’ Church, Acton

- Location within Suffolk
- Interactive map of Acton
- Population: 1,865 (2019)
- OS grid reference: TL893449
- District: Babergh
- Shire county: Suffolk
- Region: East
- Country: England
- Sovereign state: United Kingdom
- Post town: SUDBURY
- Postcode district: CO10
- Dialling code: 01787
- Police: Suffolk
- Fire: Suffolk
- Ambulance: East of England
- UK Parliament: South Suffolk

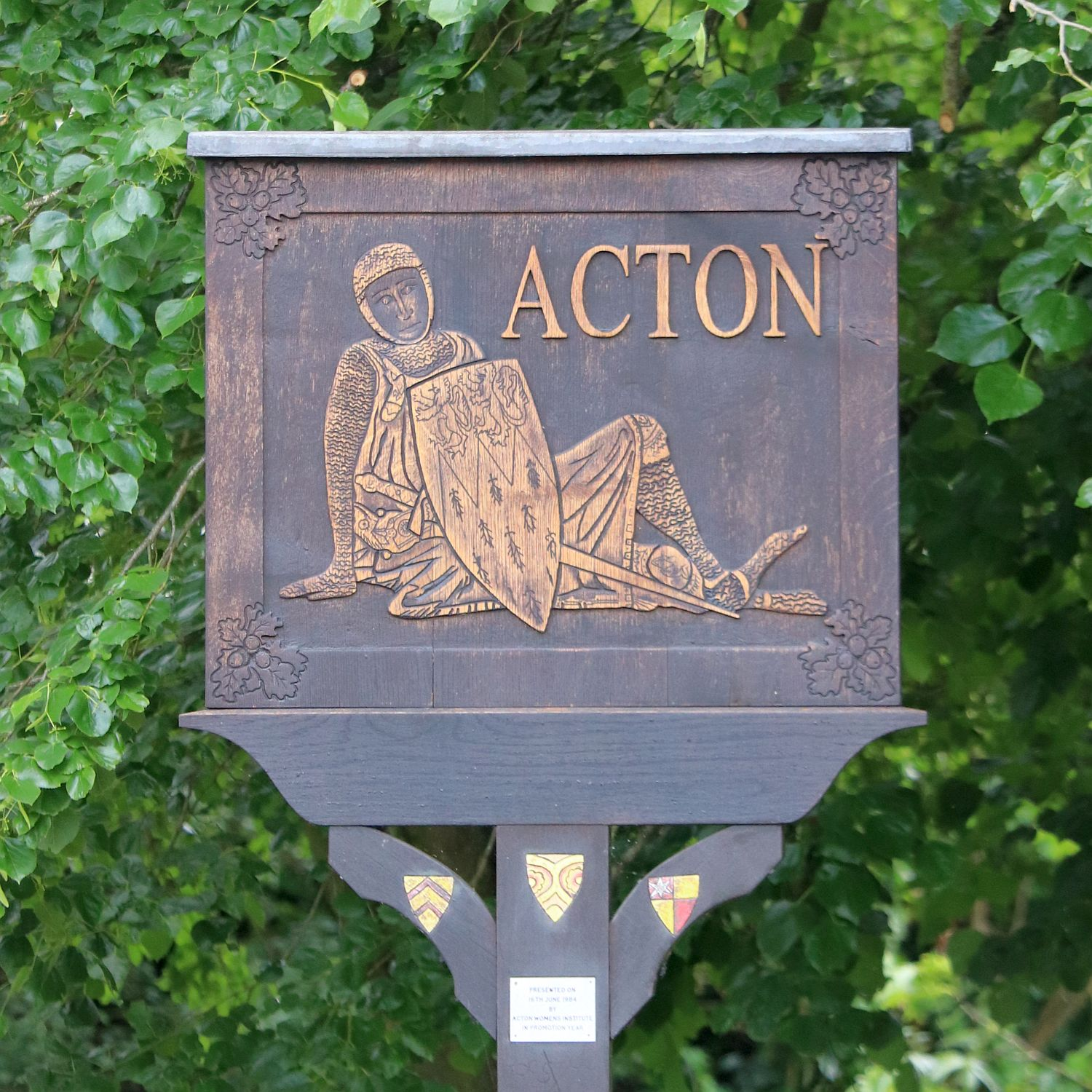
Acton village sign

Acton is a village and civil parish in the English county of Suffolk. The parish also includes the hamlets of Cuckoo Tye and Newman's Green. It is located three miles North East of Sudbury.

== Etymology ==
According to Eilert Ekwall the meaning of the name is "Village by the Oaks".

== History ==
The Domesday Book of 1086 records the population of Acton in 1086 to be 83 households along with 50 acres for farming, wood for 40 pigs, 1 mill, 11 horses at hall, 31 cattle, 160 pigs, 423 sheep, and 7 beehives. The land was held by Ranulf Peverel; before the Norman Conquest, the village was held by Siward Barn. It was located in Babergh Hundred.

All Saints is the local church. Five bells are hung in the tower for change ringing with the heaviest weighing 8cwt-1qr-4lb (928 lb), and the oldest dating from 1659 cast by Miles Graye III. The tower is affiliated to the Suffolk Guild of Ringers.

=== Historical writings ===
In 1870–72, John Marius Wilson's Imperial Gazetteer of England and Wales described the village as:

ACTON, a parish in Sudbury district, Suffolk; near the river Stour, 2½ miles N by E of Sudbury r. station. It has a post office under Sudbury. Acres, 2,811. Real property, £4,159. Pop., 558. Houses, 122. The property belongs chiefly to two. Acton Place contains some old paintings and other interesting objects. The living is a vicarage in the diocese of Ely. Value, £255.* Patron, Earl Howe. The church contains five brasses, and is good.

In 1887, John Bartholomew also wrote an entry on Acton in the Gazetteer of the British Isles with a much shorter description:

Acton, par., W. Suffolk, 2½ miles N. of Sudbury, 2811 ac., pop. 579; P.O.

== Industry ==
Between 2001 and 2002 the Reliant Robin was produced in the village's industrial estate.

== Governance ==
Acton is part of the Suffolk County Council electoral division of Sudbury East and Waldingfield, and is represented by Philip Faircloth-Mutton (Conservative).

It is also part of the Babergh District Council electoral ward called Long Melford, and is represented by Councillors Elisabeth Malvisi (Independent) and John Nunn (Independent).

== Notable former residents ==
William Jennens was known as "William the Miser" and the "Acton Miser". Jennens made his money through business in London and loaning money to gamblers, and was Britain's richest man at the time of his death in 1798, but aged 97 he had outlived the nominated executors and beneficiaries under his will. According to the BBC QI series, Jennens vs Jennens commenced in 1798 and was abandoned in 1915 (117 years later) when the legal fees had exhausted the Jennens estate of funds (worth c. £2 million). The case of Jennens v Jennens formed part of the inspiration for the Jarndyce and Jarndyce case at the centre of the plot of Bleak House by Charles Dickens.

Another Acton resident, Catherine Foster, was the last woman to be hanged at Bury St Edmunds, in 1847. At the age of 17 she poisoned her husband John Foster by putting arsenic in his dumplings. The propriety of this case was discussed in the House of Lords and reported in Hansard.

Ronald Blythe, writer, essayist and editor, best known for his work Akenfield: Portrait of an English Village, was born in the village.

== Population change ==
Population growth in Acton from 1801 to 1891
Year	1801	1811	1821	1831	1841	1851	1881	1891
Population	461	470	555	565	555	539	579	619
Source: A Vision of Britain Through Time

Population growth in Acton from 1901 to 2011
Year	1901	1911	1921	1931	1951	1961	2001	2011
Population	593	541	447	496	673	603	1,800	1,811
Source: A Vision of Britain Through Time

== See also ==
- All Saints Church, Acton
