= Corporation of Gloucester =

Former local government body in England

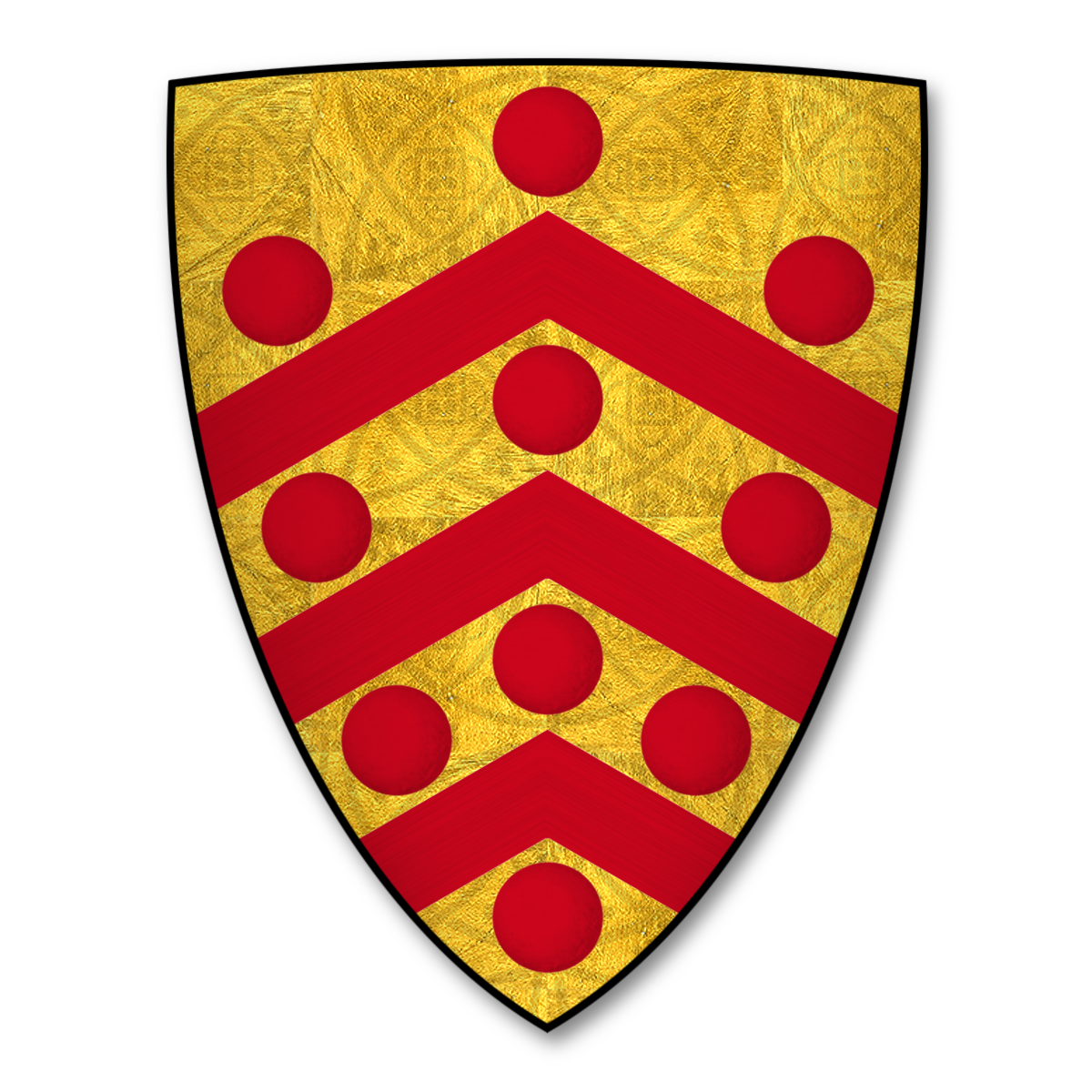
Coat of arms of the City of Gloucester

The Corporation of Gloucester was the local government of the city of Gloucester in England before the creation of Gloucester City Council.

The records of the corporation were collated by William Henry Stevenson (1853-1924) in his Calendar of the Records of the Corporation of Gloucester.

== See also ==
- Gloucester Corporation Tramways
