= Reinsch test =

Toxicology test for some heavy metals

- Purpose: Detect presence of heavy metal

The Reinsch test is an initial indicator to detect the presence of one or more of the following heavy metals in a biological sample, and is often used by toxicologists where poisoning by such metals is suspected. The method, which is sensitive to antimony, arsenic, bismuth, selenium, thallium and mercury, was discovered by Hugo Reinsch in 1841.

== Process ==
- Dissolve suspect body fluid or tissue in a hydrochloric acid solution
- Insert a copper strip into the solution.
- The appearance of a silvery coating on the copper may indicate mercury. A dark coating indicates the presence of one of the other metals.
- Confirm finding using absorption or emission spectroscopy, X-ray diffraction, or other analytical technique suitable for inorganic analysis.
- A scientific application of the Reinsch test was presented in 2010 by chemists of the Technical University of Munich, Lehrstuhl für Radiochemie (Institute for Radiochemistry, Technical University of Munich) and ITU (Institute for Transuranium Elements, Karlsruhe): in the course of the radiochemical purification of ^{79}Se for the determination of its half-life, reductive deposition of selenium on metallic copper was the first step to extract ^{79}Se from high active raffinate (= PUREX raffinate) in a hot cell.

== See also ==
- Toxicology
- Analytical chemistry
