= Worcester Street, Gloucester =

Street in Gloucester, England

Coordinates: 51.8676°N 2.2429°W

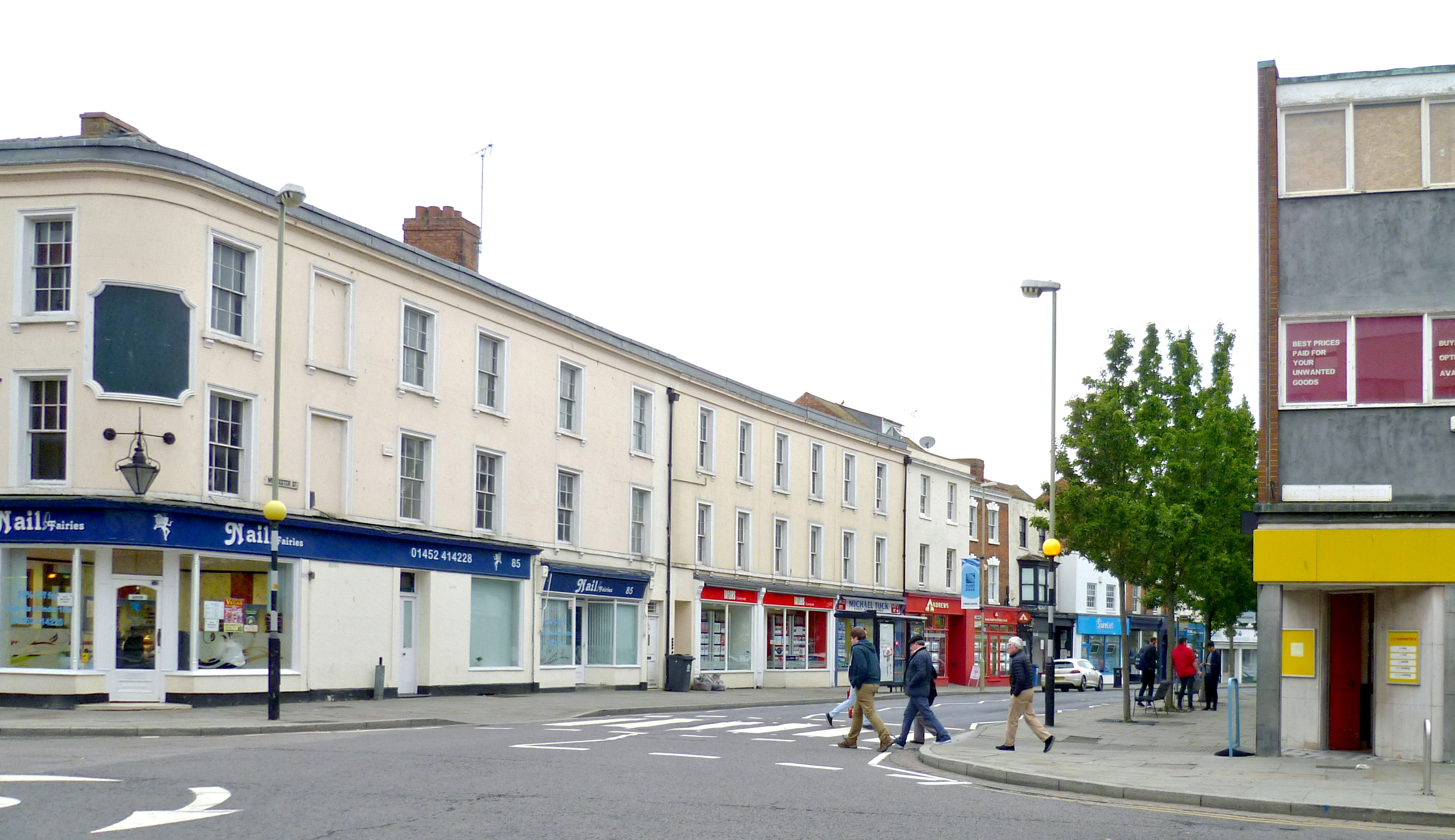
Worcester Street, south end, from Northgate Street.

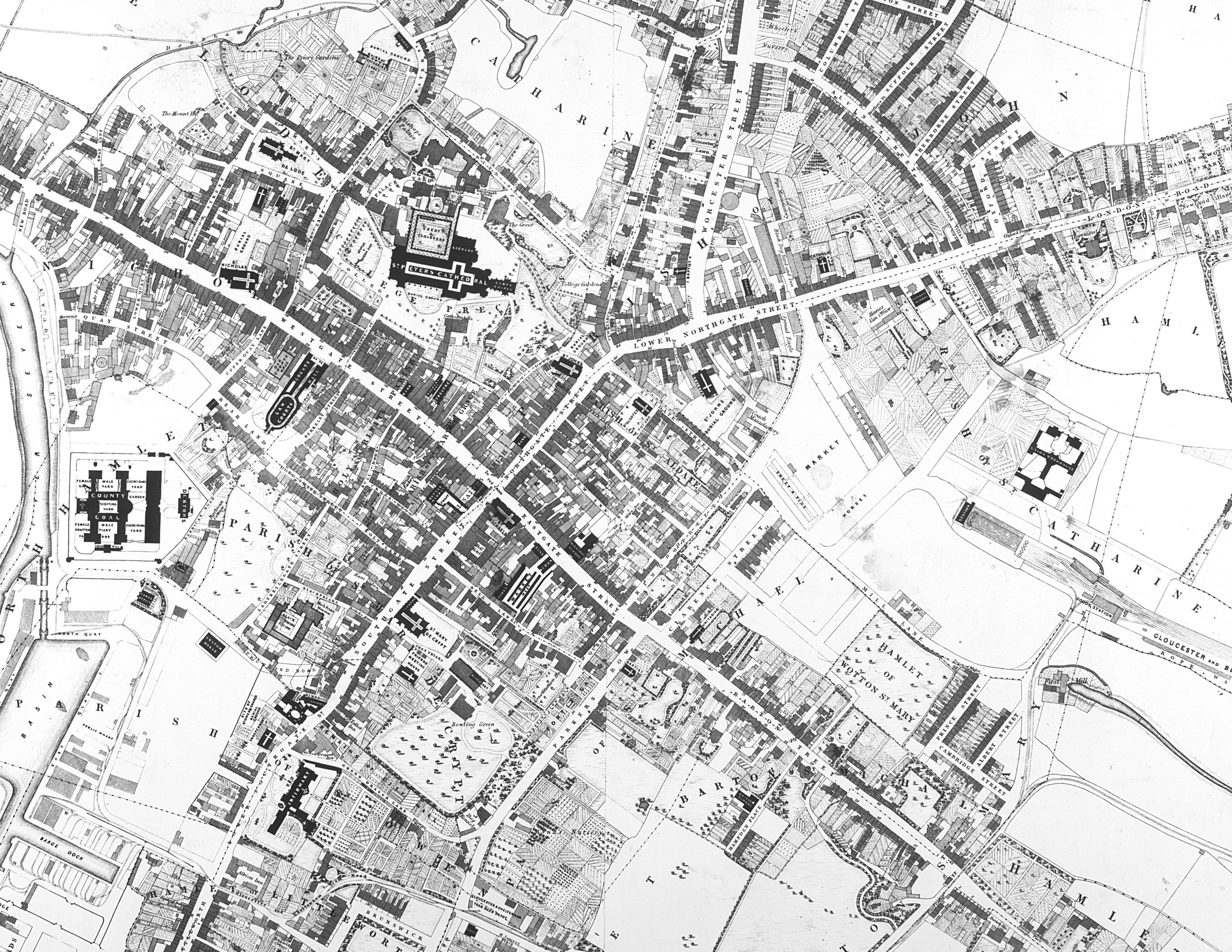
Worcester Street on Causton's 1843 map of Gloucester (top)

Worcester Street in the City of Gloucester runs between the junction of Alvin Street and Kingsholm Road in the north and Northgate Street in the south.

The street was developed in 1822 as an alternative route to Tewkesbury to replace the narrower Hare Lane and was promoted by John Phillpotts. It is shown fully laid out on Causton's 1843 map.

== Buildings ==
Worcester Street is the location of a number of listed buildings:

=== East side ===
- Nos. 18, 20, 22.
- Nos. 38–60.

=== West side ===
- No. 1
- No. 5
- Nos. 9-17
- Nos. 19, 21, 23.
- Nos. 25, 27, 29.
