= InteLex Past Masters =

InteLex Past Masters is a collection of full-text web-based scholarly editions of classic works in the humanities. InteLex Corporation was founded in 1989 by its current chief executive officer, Mark Rooks, to produce electronic versions of the works of the great philosophers, based on existing scholarly editions. The company is located in Charlottesville, Virginia. Its databases are marketed to academic institutions, with pricing based on the individual collections purchased. Content is provided in XML and searchable image format and is accessed through the InteLex Corporation website. In addition to philosophy, subject coverage includes religious studies, English literature, women's writing, social science, and history of science. InteLex databases are found in institutions in over 65 countries around the world.
