= Sadiq Khan =

Mayor of London since 2016

The Right Honourable The Lord Khan of Tooting PC SPk Hon FRIBA
- Khan in 2026

Mayor of London
- Incumbent
- Assumed office 9 May 2016
- Deputy: Joanne McCartney
- Preceded by: Boris Johnson
Shadow Cabinet posts
Shadow Secretary of State for Justice Shadow Lord Chancellor
In office 8 October 2010 – 11 May 2015
Leader	Ed Miliband
Preceded by	Jack Straw
Succeeded by	Charlie Falconer
Shadow Minister for London
In office 16 January 2013 – 11 May 2015
Leader	Ed Miliband
Preceded by	Tessa Jowell
Succeeded by	Gareth Bacon (2024)
Shadow Secretary of State for Transport
In office 12 May 2010 – 8 October 2010
Leader	Harriet Harman (Acting); Ed Miliband
Preceded by	Theresa Villiers
Succeeded by	Maria Eagle
Ministerial offices
Minister of State for Transport
In office 9 June 2009 – 11 May 2010
Prime Minister	Gordon Brown
Preceded by	Andrew Adonis
Succeeded by	Theresa Villiers
Parliamentary Under-Secretary of State for Communities and Local Government
In office 5 October 2008 – 9 June 2009
Prime Minister	Gordon Brown
Preceded by	Parmjit Dhanda
Succeeded by	Shahid Malik

Member of the House of Lords
- Lord Temporal
- Life peerage 20 August 2026

Member of Parliament for Tooting
- In office 5 May 2005 – 9 May 2016
- Preceded by: Tom Cox
- Succeeded by: Rosena Allin-Khan

Personal details
- Born: Sadiq Aman Khan; 8 October 1970 (age 56) Tooting, London, England
- Party: Labour
- Spouse: Saadiya Ahmed (m. 1994)
- Children: 2
- Education: University of North London (LLB); University of Law (LPC)
- Website: sadiq.london
- Sadiq Khan's voice Khan's opening speech at The 7th Asian Awards; Recorded 5 May 2017

Sadiq Aman Khan, Baron Khan of Tooting (Note: /ˈsɑːdɪk ˈkɑːn/;; Urdu: صادق خان (Ṣādiq K͟hān) (Urdu pronunciation: [ˈsɑːdɪq ˈxɑːn])) (born 8 October 1970), is a British politician who has served as Mayor of London since 2016. He was previously the member of Parliament (MP) for Tooting from 2005 to 2016. He was elevated to the House of Lords as a life peer in 2026. A member of the Labour Party, Khan is on the party's soft left and has been ideologically characterised as a social democrat.

Born and raised in London into a British Pakistani family, Khan earned a law degree from the University of North London. He subsequently worked as a solicitor specialising in human rights issues and chaired the advocacy group Liberty for three years. Joining the Labour Party, Khan was a councillor for the London Borough of Wandsworth from 1994 to 2006 before being elected MP for Tooting at the 2005 general election. He was critical of several policies of Labour prime minister Tony Blair, including the 2003 invasion of Iraq and new anti-terror legislation. Under Blair's successor Gordon Brown, Khan was appointed a parliamentary under-secretary of state in the Department for Communities and Local Government in 2008, later becoming Minister of State for Transport. A key ally of the next Labour leader, Ed Miliband, he served in Miliband's Shadow Cabinet as Shadow Secretary of State for Justice, Shadow Lord Chancellor and Shadow Minister for London.

Khan was elected Mayor of London at the 2016 mayoral election, defeating the Conservative candidate Zac Goldsmith, and resigned as an MP. As the strategic authority mayor for Greater London, he implemented the Hopper fare for unlimited bus and tram journeys for an hour, increased the cost and the area covered by the London congestion charge, and introduced new charges (the T-Charge and the Ultra Low Emission Zone) for older and more polluting vehicles driving in the city. He also backed expansion at London City Airport and Gatwick Airport. He was a vocal supporter of the unsuccessful Britain Stronger in Europe and People's Vote campaigns for the UK to remain in the European Union. Khan established the Commission for Diversity in the Public Realm following the 2020 George Floyd protests. Although Khan initially froze some Transport for London (TfL) fares, he has implemented transport fare rises since 2021 in return for a £1.6 billion bailout from the UK government during the COVID-19 pandemic, and also lobbied the government to introduce public health restrictions on several occasions throughout the pandemic. He was re-elected in the 2021 and 2024 London mayoral elections, being the first and only London mayor to win a third term.

Khan is the only mayor of Greater London to have been knighted and made a peer of the realm. His policies as mayor have resulted in making London's transport more accessible and reducing the number of polluting vehicles in central London. Under Khan's decade-long mayoralty, London's homicide rate fell in 2025 to its lowest in decades, and figures showed reductions in several serious violence categories, including gun‑related offences.

== Early life and education ==
Sadiq Aman Khan was born on 8 October 1970 at St George's Hospital in Tooting, a district in the Wandsworth borough of South London, into a working-class Pakistani immigrant family. His grandparents were Muhajirs who migrated from Lucknow, in the United Provinces of British India (now in Uttar Pradesh, India), to Karachi in Federal Capital Territory (now in Sindh, Pakistan) following the partition of India in 1947. His father Amanullah and his mother Sehrun arrived in England from Pakistan in 1968. Khan was the fifth of eight children, seven of whom were boys. In London, Amanullah worked as a bus driver and Sehrun as a seamstress. Apart from English, Khan is also fluent in Urdu.

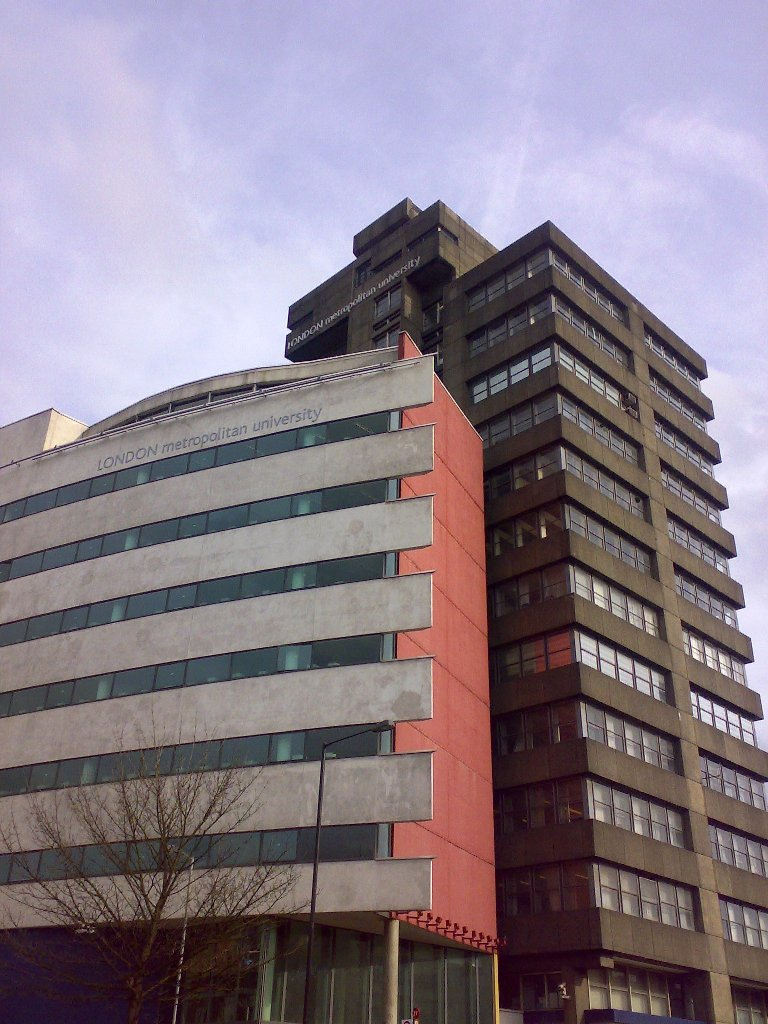
Khan graduated with a Bachelor of Laws degree from the University of North London (now London Metropolitan University).

Khan and his siblings were raised Sunni Muslims in a three-bedroom council flat on the Henry Prince Estate in Earlsfield. He attended Fircroft Primary School and then Ernest Bevin School, a local comprehensive. Khan studied science and mathematics at A-Level, in the hope of eventually becoming a dentist. A teacher recommended that he study law instead, as he had an argumentative personality. The teacher's suggestion, along with the American television programme L.A. Law, inspired Khan to do so. He studied law at the University of North London (now London Metropolitan University). His parents later moved out of their council flat and purchased their own home. Like his brothers, Khan was a fan of sport, particularly enjoying football, cricket, and boxing.

From his earliest years, Khan worked: "I was surrounded by my mum and dad working all the time, so as soon as I could get a job, I got a job. I got a paper round, a Saturday job – some summers I laboured on a building site." The family continues to send money to relatives in Pakistan, "because we're blessed being in this country". He and his family often encountered racism, which led to him and his brothers taking up boxing at the Earlsfield Amateur Boxing Club. While studying for his degree, between the ages of 18 and 21, he had a Saturday job at the Peter Jones department store in Sloane Square.

== Legal career ==
Before entering the House of Commons in 2005, Khan practised as a solicitor. After completing his law degree in 1991, Khan took his Law Society finals at the College of Law in Guildford. In 1994, he married Saadiya Ahmed, who was also a solicitor.

Also in 1994, Khan became a trainee solicitor at a firm of solicitors called Christian Fisher; the firm undertook mainly legal aid cases. The partners were Michael Fisher and Louise Christian. Khan became a partner at the firm in 1997, and like Christian, specialised in human rights law. When Fisher left in 2002, the firm was renamed Christian Khan. Khan left the firm in 2004, after he became the prospective Labour candidate for the Tooting parliamentary constituency.

During his legal career, he acted in actions against employment and discrimination law, judicial reviews, inquests, the police, and crime, and was involved in cases including the following:

- Bubbins vs United Kingdom (European Court of Human Rights – shooting of an unarmed individual by police marksmen)
- Dr Jadhav v Secretary of State for Health (racial discrimination in the employment of Indian doctors by the health service)
- CI Logan v Met Police (racial discrimination)
- Supt Dizaei v Met Police (police damages, discrimination)
- Inquest into the death of David Rocky Bennett (use of restraints)
- Lead solicitor on Mayday demonstration 2001 test case litigation (Human Rights Act)
- Farrakhan v Home Secretary (Human Rights Act): in 2001, Khan represented the American Nation of Islam leader Louis Farrakhan in the High Court and overturned a ban on him entering the United Kingdom, first imposed in 1986. The government subsequently won on appeal.
- In February 2000, Khan represented a group of Kurdish actors who were arrested by Metropolitan Police during a rehearsal of the Harold Pinter play Mountain Language, securing £150,000 in damages for the group for their wrongful arrest and the trauma caused by the arrest.
- Represented Maajid Nawaz, Reza Pankhurst and Ian Nisbet in Egyptian court when they were arrested on charges of trying to revive Hizb ut-Tahrir.

== In Parliament ==
=== First term: 2005–2010 ===
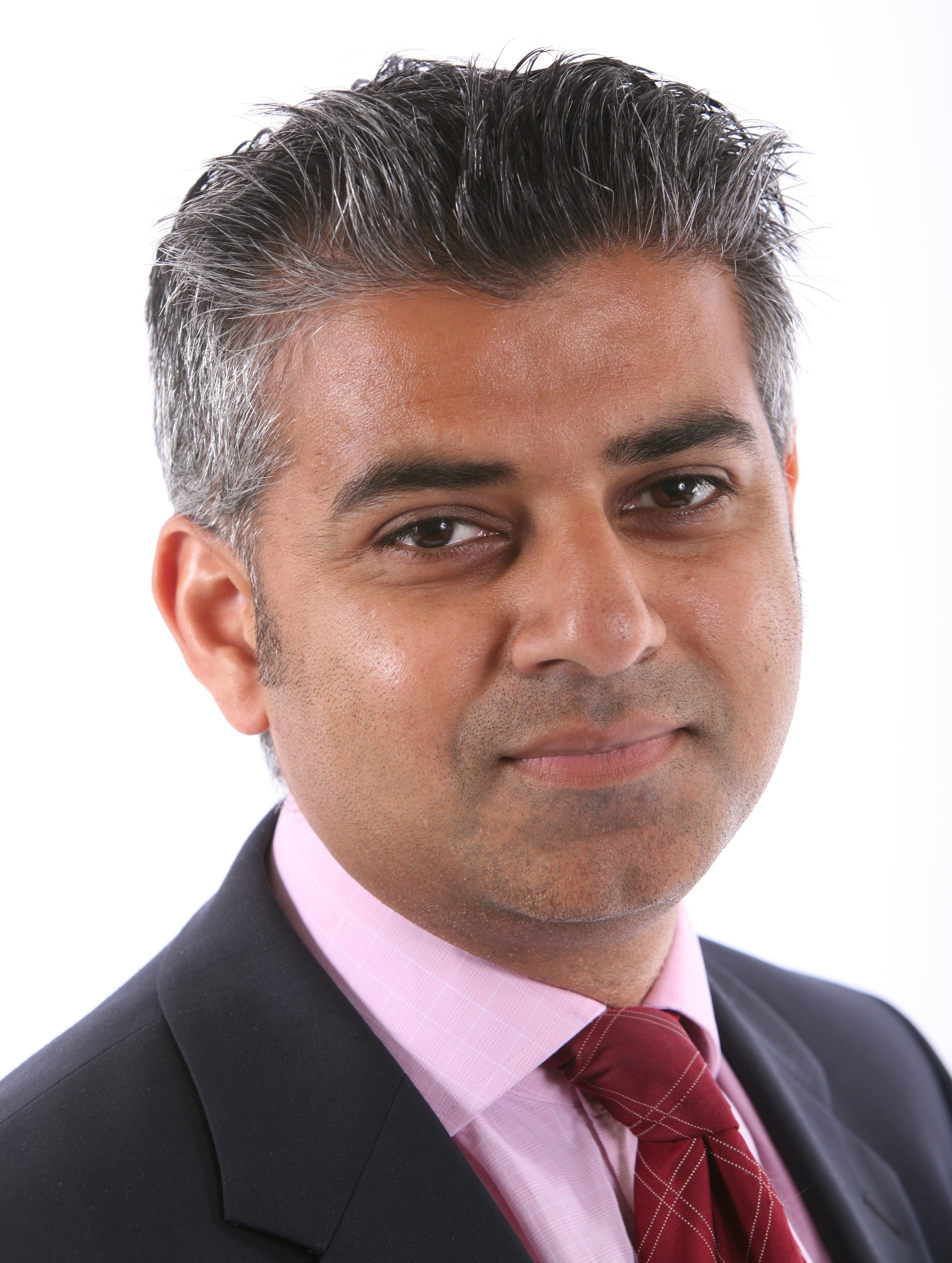
Khan's official portrait as a MP c. 2007

Before entering Parliament, Khan represented Tooting as a councillor on Wandsworth Council from 1994 to 2006, and was granted the title of Honorary Alderman of Wandsworth upon his retirement from local politics.

In 2003, Tooting Constituency Labour Party decided to open its parliamentary selection to all interested candidates, including the incumbent MP since 1974, Tom Cox. This prompted Cox, then in his mid-70s, to announce his retirement rather than risk de-selection. In the subsequent selection contest, Khan defeated five other local candidates to become Labour's candidate for the seat. He was elected to Parliament at the 2005 general election.

Khan was one of the Labour MPs who led the successful opposition to Prime Minister Tony Blair's proposed introduction of 90 days' detention without charge for those suspected of terrorism offences. In recognition of this, The Spectator – a right-wing magazine then edited by Boris Johnson – awarded him the "Newcomer of the Year Award" at the 2005 Parliamentarian of the Year Awards. The magazine's editorial board stated that he had received the award "for the tough-mindedness and clarity with which he has spoken about the very difficult issues of Islamic terror".

In August 2006, two days after seven terrorists were arrested for attempting the 2006 transatlantic aircraft plot Khan signed an open letter to Tony Blair that was signed by prominent Muslims and published in The Guardian. The letter criticised UK foreign policy and in particular the 2003 invasion of Iraq, stating that Blair's policies had caused great harm to civilians in the Middle East and provided "ammunition to extremists who threaten us all". In interviews with the BBC, Labour Home Secretary John Reid – who had coordinated the arrests – described the letter as "a dreadful misjudgement", and former Conservative leader Michael Howard described it as "a form of blackmail".

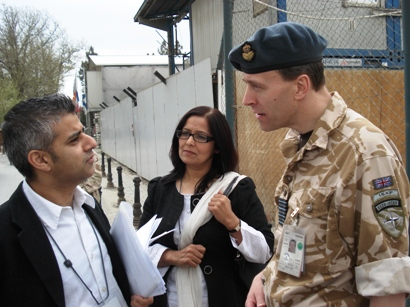
Khan meeting with British troops stationed in Kabul, Afghanistan in 2008

Khan had to repay £500 in expenses in 2007 in relation to a newsletter sent to constituents featuring a "Labour rose", which was deemed to be unduly prominent. While the content of the newsletter was not deemed to be party political, the rose logo was found to be unduly prominent which may have had the effect of promoting a political party. There was no suggestion that Khan had deliberately or dishonestly compiled his expenses claims, which were not explicitly disallowed under the rules at that time. The rules were retrospectively changed disallowing the claim, which had previously been approved by the House of Commons authorities.

On 3 February 2008, The Sunday Times claimed that a conversation between Khan and prisoner Babar Ahmad – a constituent accused of involvement in terrorism – at Woodhill Prison in Milton Keynes had been bugged by the Metropolitan Police Anti-Terrorist Branch. An inquiry was launched by the Justice Secretary, Jack Straw. There was concern that the bugging contravened the Wilson Doctrine that police should not bug MPs. The report concluded that the doctrine did not apply because it affected only bugging requiring approval by the Home Secretary, while in Khan's case the monitoring was authorised by a senior police officer. The Home Secretary, Jacqui Smith, then announced a further policy review and said the bugging of discussions between MPs and their constituents should be banned.

In June 2007, Blair stood down as both Prime Minister and Labour Party leader, to be replaced by Gordon Brown. Brown thought highly of Khan, who moved up the parliamentary ranks under Brown's Premiership. Brown made Khan a party whip, who was therefore charged with ensuring that Labour-sponsored legislation made it through the parliamentary process to become law. In July 2008, Khan helped push through a government proposal to permit the detention of those suspected of terror offences for 42 days without charge. For his part in this, Khan was criticised by Liberty's Shami Chakrabarti and others, who claimed that Khan had contravened his principles on civil liberties issues.

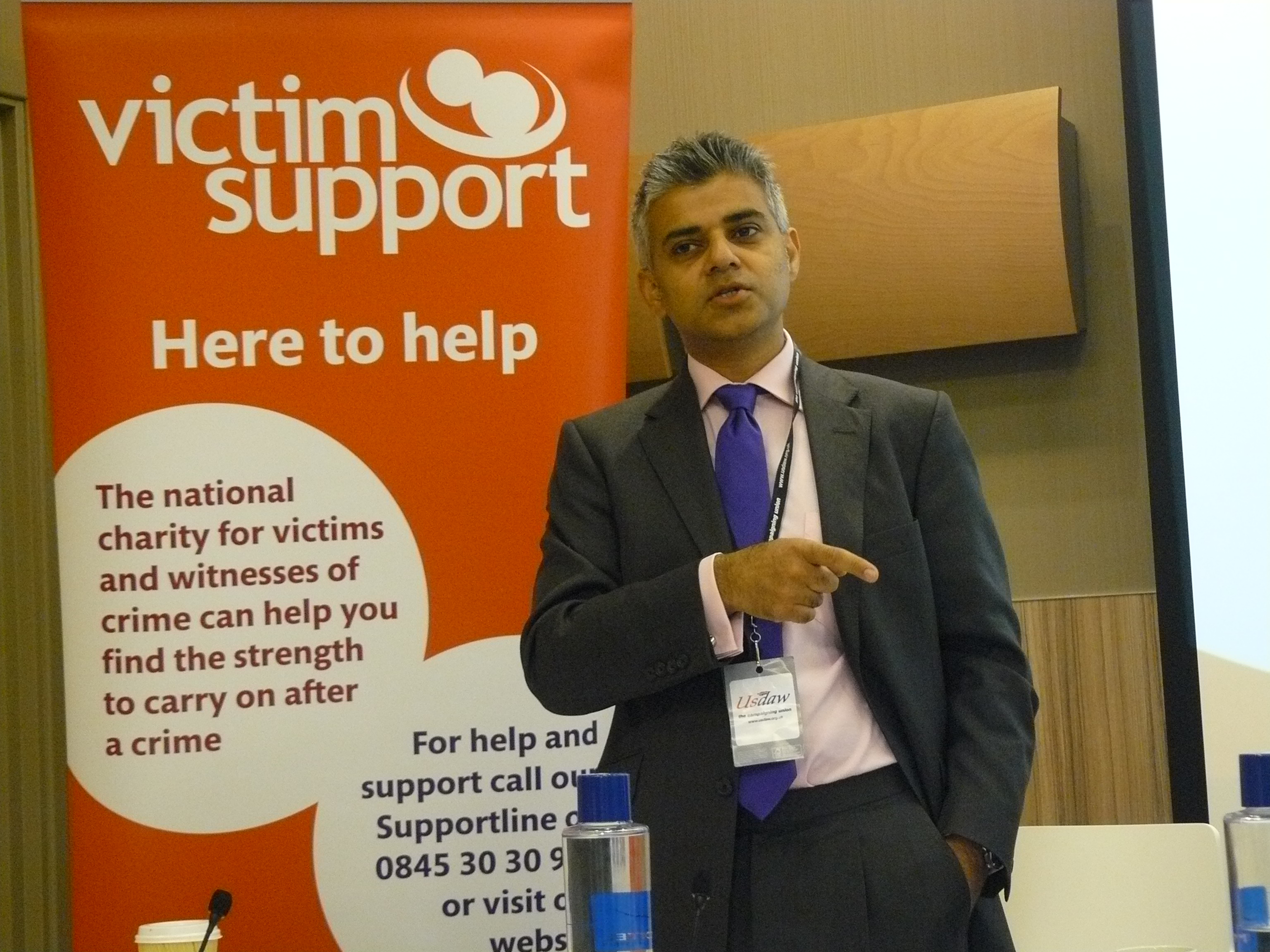
Sadiq Khan speaking in 2011

On Prime Minister Gordon Brown's Cabinet reshuffle of 3 October 2008, Khan was appointed Parliamentary Under-Secretary of State for Communities and Local Government.

In 2008, the Fabian Society published Khan's book, Fairness Not Favours. In this work, Khan argued that the Labour Party had to reconnect with British Muslims, arguing that it had lost the trust of this community as a result of the Iraq War. He also said that British Muslims had their own part to play in reconnecting with politicians, arguing that they needed to rid themselves of a victim mentality and take greater responsibility for their own community. In the House of Commons in January 2009, Khan criticised Pope Benedict XVI for the rehabilitation of Bishop Richard Williamson following his remarks about the Holocaust, a move he described as "highly unsavoury" and of "great concern".

In June 2009 he was promoted to Minister of State for Transport. In what was believed to be a first for an MP, Khan used his Twitter account to self-announce his promotion. Though Khan was not a member of the cabinet, he attended meetings for agenda items covering his policy area, thus becoming the first Muslim to attend the British Cabinet. As Transport Minister, Khan supported plans to expand Heathrow Airport with the addition of a third runway.

During this period, Khan served as chairman of the socialist Fabian Society, remaining on its executive committee. He is a vice-president of the Fabian Society. In 2009, he won the Jenny Jeger Award (Best Fabian Pamphlet) for his work Fairness not Favours: How to re-connect with British Muslims.

In March 2010, Khan publicly stated that for a second successive year he would not be taking a pay rise as an MP or Minister, declaring "At a time when many people in Tooting and throughout the country are having to accept pay freezes I don't think it's appropriate for MPs to accept a pay rise."

=== Second and third term: 2010–2016 ===
In 2010, Khan was re-elected as the MP for Tooting, despite a swing against his party of 3.6% and a halving of his previous majority. His campaign in Tooting had been supported by Harris Bokhari, who reportedly used anti-Ahmadiyya sentiment to mobilise Muslim voters at a mosque in Tooting to vote for Khan instead of the Liberal Democrat candidate, Nasser Butt, an Ahmadiyya. In 2019, Bokhari was appointed to join Khan's new Diversity, Equality and Inclusion Advisory Group. In the subsequent Labour leadership election Khan was an early backer of Ed Miliband, becoming his campaign manager. In the wake of Labour's 2010 election defeat, Acting Leader Harriet Harman appointed Khan Shadow Secretary of State for Transport. Khan orchestrated Ed Miliband's successful campaign to become Labour leader, and was appointed to the senior roles of Shadow Lord Chancellor and Shadow Justice Secretary.

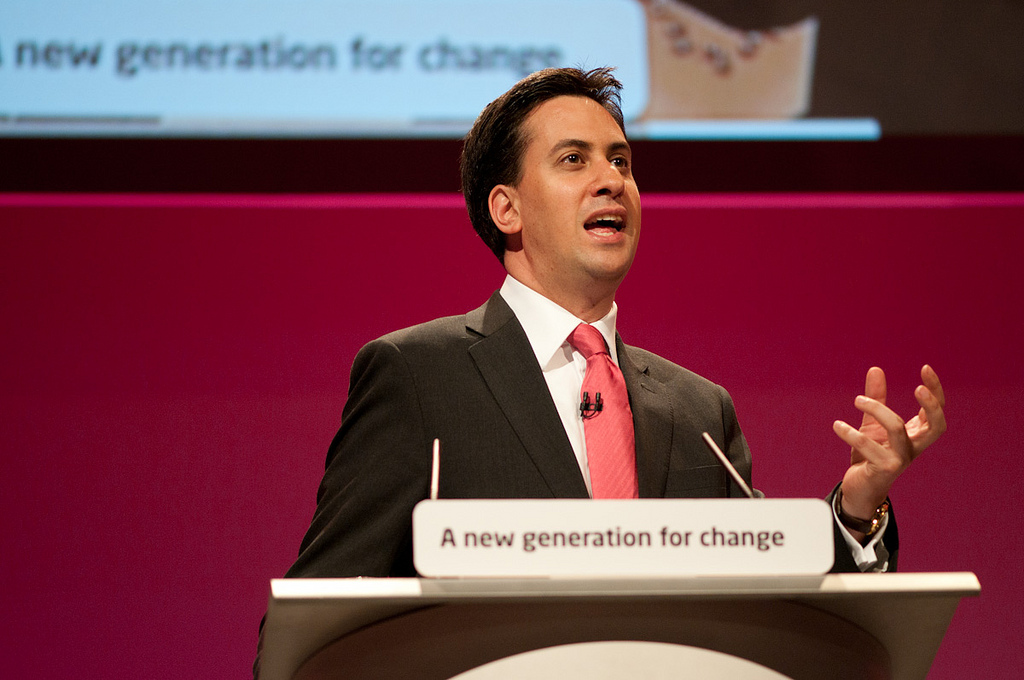
Khan orchestrated Ed Miliband's successful campaign to become Labour Leader and later served in Miliband's Shadow Cabinet.

In April 2010 it was revealed that Khan had repaid falsely claimed expenses on two occasions, when literature was sent to his constituents. The first incident concerned letters sent out before the 2010 General Election which were ruled to have the "unintentional effect of promoting his return to office", the second a £2,550 repayment for Christmas, Eid, and birthday cards for constituents, dating back to 2006. Under House of Commons rules, pre-paid envelopes and official stationery can only be used for official parliamentary business. Khan's claim for the greetings cards was initially rejected, but he presented a new invoice no longer identifying the nature of the claim, and this was accepted. Khan attributed the improper claim for the cards to "inexperience" and human error and apologised for breaking the expenses rules.

In early 2013, Miliband appointed Khan as the Shadow Minister for London, a position that he held in addition to his other responsibilities. In December 2013, the Fabian Society published a collection of essays edited by Khan that was titled Our London. Khan was also tasked with overseeing Labour's campaign for the 2014 London local elections, in which the party advanced its control in the city, gaining hold of twenty of the thirty-two boroughs. By this point, there was much talk of Khan making a bid for the London Mayoralty in 2016, when incumbent Mayor Boris Johnson would be stepping down. His options were affected by the outcome of the 2015 general election; if Labour won, then he would be expected to become a government minister, but if they lost then he would be free to pursue the Mayoralty. In December 2015, Khan voted against the Cameron government's plans to expand the bombing of targets in the Islamic State.

Polls had suggested that Labour could be the largest party in a hung parliament following the 2015 general election, but ultimately the Conservatives secured victory. In the vote, Khan was returned for a third term as MP for Tooting, defeating his Conservative rival by 2,842 votes. He was one of 36 Labour MPs to nominate Jeremy Corbyn as a candidate in the Labour leadership election of 2015, but has said that he was "no patsy" to Corbyn and would stand up to him. He later stated that he nominated Corbyn to "broaden the debate" but did not then vote for him.

On 9 May 2016, Khan resigned as an MP by his appointment to the ancient office of Crown Steward and Bailiff of The Three Chiltern Hundreds, a customary practice in the UK. This triggered a by-election in Tooting which was held on 16 June 2016.

He is regularly named among the Top 100 London politicians in the London Evening Standard's annual poll of the 1,000 most influential Londoners and is an Ambassador for Mosaic Network, an initiative set up by Prince Charles. In 2023, Khan was named by the New Statesman as the seventeenth most powerful left-wing figure of 2023.

=== House of Lords: 2026–present ===
Khan was given a peerage in July 2026 at the recommendation of outgoing Prime Minister Keir Starmer. Khan was created as Baron Khan of Tooting, of Tooting in the London Borough of Wandsworth on 20 August 2026.

== Mayor of London (2016–present) ==
In 2016, Sadiq Khan ran for mayor of London and was elected with 57% of the vote. He became the first Muslim mayor and first from an ethnic minority. Khan was officially sworn in at Southwark Cathedral the following day. His first act as mayor was attending a Holocaust memorial ceremony at a rugby stadium in North London, although due to delays in the election count, he officially took office on 9 May.

=== 2016 candidacy ===
==== Nomination as Labour candidate ====
"An affordable and secure home to rent or buy, more jobs with higher wages for the lowest paid, making it easier to set up and run a successful business, reducing the cost of commuting, and making London's environment safer, healthier and less polluted."

— Khan's priorities as Mayor.

After Labour's defeat at the 2015 general election, Khan resigned from the Shadow Cabinet. He then announced himself as a candidate to be the Labour nominee for the London Mayoral elections of 2016. Khan soon gained the support of prominent figures in the party, including former Mayor of London Ken Livingstone, who was on Labour's leftist, socialist wing, and Oona King, who was on its centrist, Blairite wing. He also received the backing of the Labour-affiliated GMB and Unite unions, and the nomination of 44 of Labour's 73 parliamentary constituent parties in London, leaving him as one of the top two contenders.

Khan's main rival was Conservative candidate Zac Goldsmith; Khan described him as a spoiled dilettante who "never finishes anything he starts". A YouGov poll for LBC suggested that while the other main contender to be the Labour nominee, Tessa Jowell, would defeat Goldsmith in a mayoral election, Khan would not. In hustings, Khan placed an emphasis on his working-class origins, which would play against Jowell's wealthier upbringing, and argued for the need for change in London, thereby insinuating that Jowell would represent too much continuity with the outgoing Johnson administration. In September 2015, Khan was announced as the winning nominee. He gained 48,152 votes (58.9%) against Jowell's 35,573 (41.1%). He was the favourite candidate in all three voting categories; Labour Party members, members of affiliated trade unions and organisations, and registered supporters who had paid £3 in order to vote.

==== Campaign ====
Khan vowed that if elected, he would freeze public transport fares in London for four years. He claimed that this would deprive Transport for London (TfL) of £452 million, but TfL stated that it would deprive them of £1.9 billion, taking into account projected population growth over this period. Although he had previously backed Heathrow expansion, he now opposed it, instead calling for expansion at Gatwick Airport. He spoke of clamping down on foreign property investors, and proposed the establishment of both a "London living rent" tenure and a not-for-profit lettings agency that could undercut commercial operators in order to ease the high cost of renting in the city. He also called for house building on land owned by TfL, insisting that at least 50% of those constructed should be "genuinely affordable".

A YouGov poll found that 31% of Londoners stated that they would not be "comfortable" with a Muslim mayor. He declared his opposition to homophobia, and said that he would have "zero tolerance for anti-Semitism". He openly condemned Islamic extremism and called on the Muslim community to take a leading role in combating it, although at the same time acknowledged the Islamophobia that many British Muslims faced. Khan declared that he would be "the most pro-business mayor ever", and met with groups such as the Federation of Small Businesses and City of London Corporation. Goldsmith's Conservative campaign emphasised connections between Khan and then Labour leader Jeremy Corbyn. Both the Conservative campaign and several Conservative-aligned newspapers were accused of tarring Khan as an apologist for, or even sympathiser with, Islamic extremism.

International press sources often focused on his religious identity, with many right-wing American media outlets reacting with horror at his election.

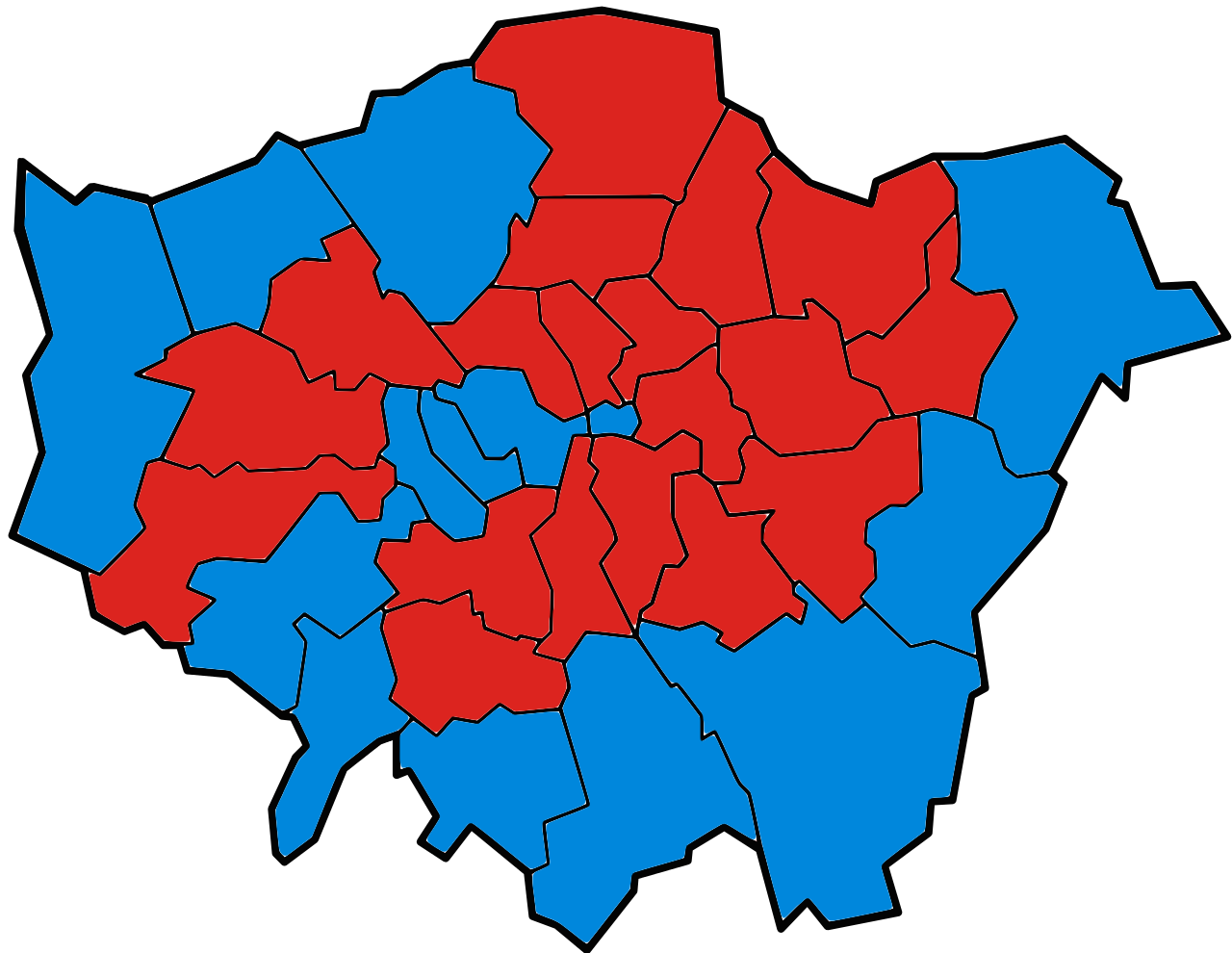
Map of Greater London boroughs showing those that voted for Khan (red) and Goldsmith (blue) in the 2016 mayoral election

Khan won the election with 57% of the vote. The 1.3 million votes he received are the largest any UK politician has personally received to date. Various press sources noted that Khan's election made him the first actively affiliated Muslim to become mayor of a major Western capital.

=== Re-election in 2021 ===
After the 2019 United Kingdom general election, following the resignation of Jeremy Corbyn as the leader of the Labour Party, there were some speculations on whether Khan could run in the triggered leadership election. However, he ruled himself out of the leadership election, to run for a second term as mayor of London, which he explained he was 'absolutely' more interested in. In the 2021 London mayoral election, Khan was re-elected for a second term, defeating the Conservative candidate Shaun Bailey.

=== Re-election in 2024 ===
Following Khan's re-election into second term, there had been speculation as to whether he would run for a third term, or instead seek election to the House of Commons in hope of becoming leader of the Labour Party. Khan stated that he would run for a third term. In the 2024 London mayoral election Khan was re-elected, defeating the Conservative candidate Susan Hall and making him the first to be elected to serve three terms as the Mayor of London.

=== Mayoralty ===
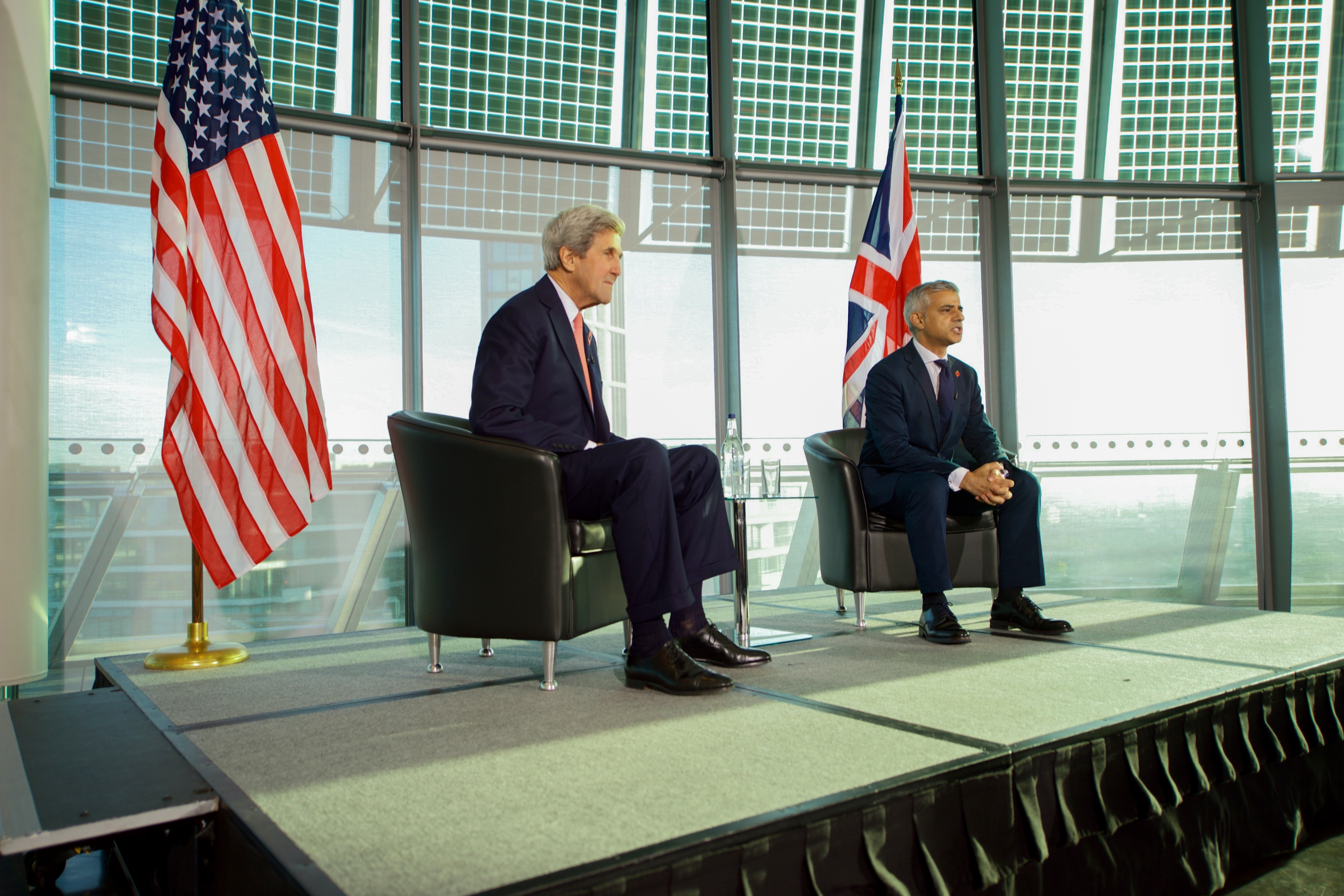
Khan and U.S. Secretary of State John Kerry at London City Hall, October 2016

In August 2016, Khan declared his support for Owen Smith's failed bid to oust Jeremy Corbyn as Leader of the Labour Party. Although describing him as a "principled Labour man", Khan said that Corbyn had failed to gain popularity with the electorate and that Labour would not win a general election under Corbyn's leadership.

On 8 January 2021, Khan announced a planned council tax rise of 9.5% to help fund policing and free transport for pensioners and schoolchildren in London. Khan's proposal would see an overall increase of 9.5% or £31.59 a year for an average Band D council tax payer. Since his first budget in 2017–18, Khan has increased the Greater London Authority's council tax precept by 31%, from £280 a year to £363.66 a year for a Band D property. On the same day, Khan also ordered London residents to cease travelling after he declared the COVID-19 crisis in London a "major incident" with "out of control" spread, as infection rates for London were estimated to be around 1 in 30, with highs of 1 in 20 in some parts of the city.

==== European Union and Brexit ====
In the buildup to the referendum on the UK's continuing membership of the European Union (EU), Khan was a vocal supporter of the "Remain" camp. He agreed to attend a Britain Stronger in Europe campaign event with the Conservative Prime Minister David Cameron to demonstrate cross-party support for remaining within the EU, for which he was criticised by Labour Shadow Chancellor John McDonnell, who claimed that sharing a platform with the Conservatives "discredits us". After the murder of MP Jo Cox during the campaign, Khan called for the country to "pause and reflect" on the manner in which the Leave and Remain camps had been approaching the debate, stating that it had been marred by a "climate of hatred, of poison, of negativity, of cynicism". Following the success of the "Leave" vote, Khan insisted that all EU citizens living in London were welcome in the city and that he was grateful for the contribution that they made to it. He endorsed the Metropolitan Police's "We Stand Together" campaign to combat the rise in racial abuse following the referendum, and later backed the "London is Open" campaign to encourage businesses, artists, and performers to continue coming to the city despite Brexit.

On 20 October 2018, Khan marched with People's Vote protesters from Park Lane to Parliament Square in support of a referendum on the final Brexit deal. The march was started by Khan and featured speeches by Delia Smith and Steve Coogan. The organisers of the march said that almost 700,000 people took part. Police stated that they were unable to estimate the numbers involved and a later police debriefing document prepared by Khan's Greater London Authority estimated the number to be 250,000.

On 23 March 2019, Khan took part in the Put It to the People march in London in support of a second Brexit referendum. Khan addressed a rally at the end of the march alongside SNP leader Nicola Sturgeon, Conservative peer Michael Heseltine, former Attorney General Dominic Grieve, Labour's deputy leader Tom Watson, and MPs Jess Phillips, Justine Greening and David Lammy.

In January 2023, Khan said that he couldn't ignore the immense damage caused by Brexit, arguing for a more sensible approach to mitigate the damage, including a debate on rejoining the single market. He also believed that Brexit had "weakened our economy, fractured our union and diminished our reputation. But, crucially, not beyond repair."

In April 2024, Khan called for the UK to establish a youth mobility scheme with the European Union. He argued that such a scheme would benefit young people and the economy, and emphasised the distinction between youth mobility and the free movement of people within the single market.

==== Diversity issues ====
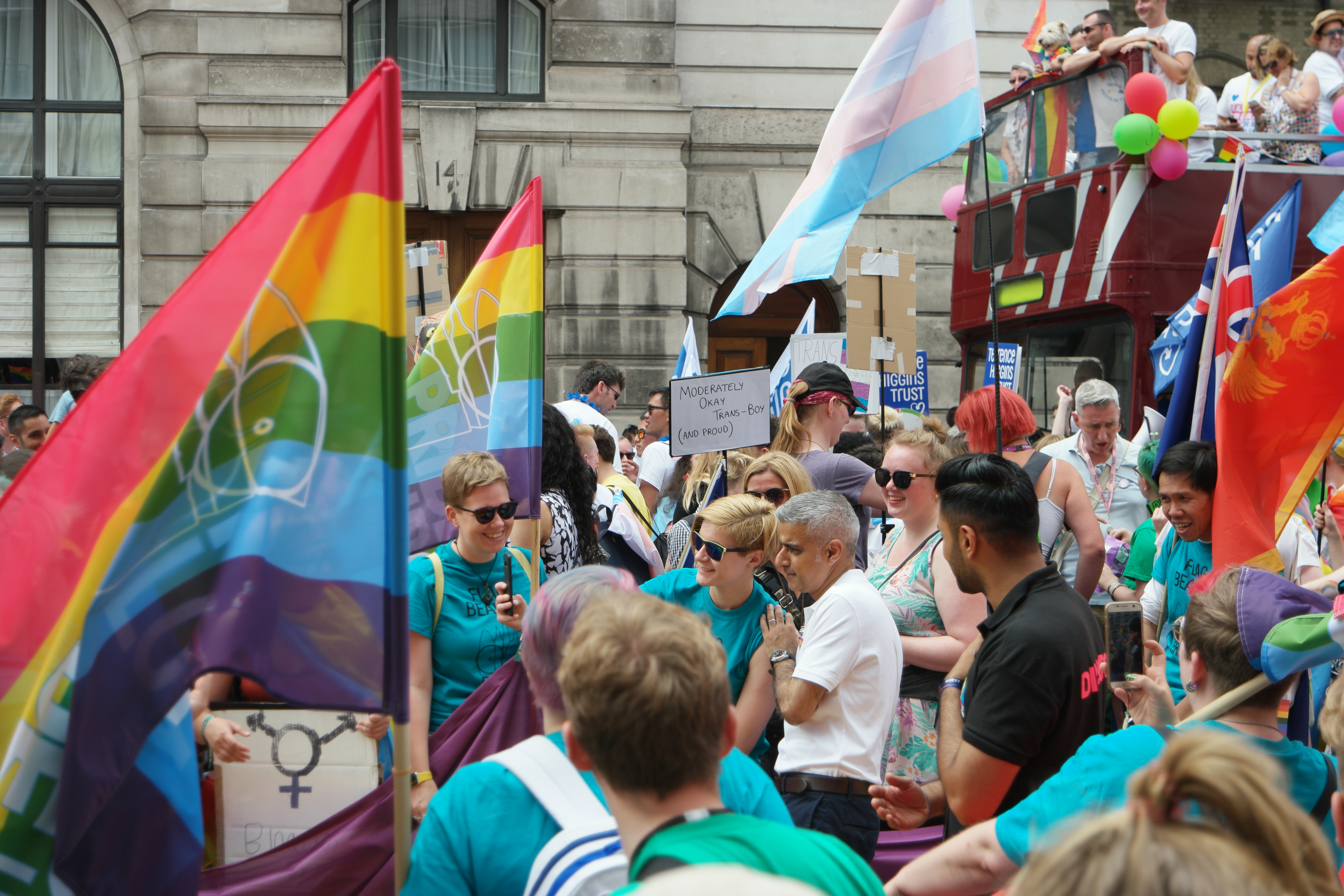
Khan at Pride in London, July 2017

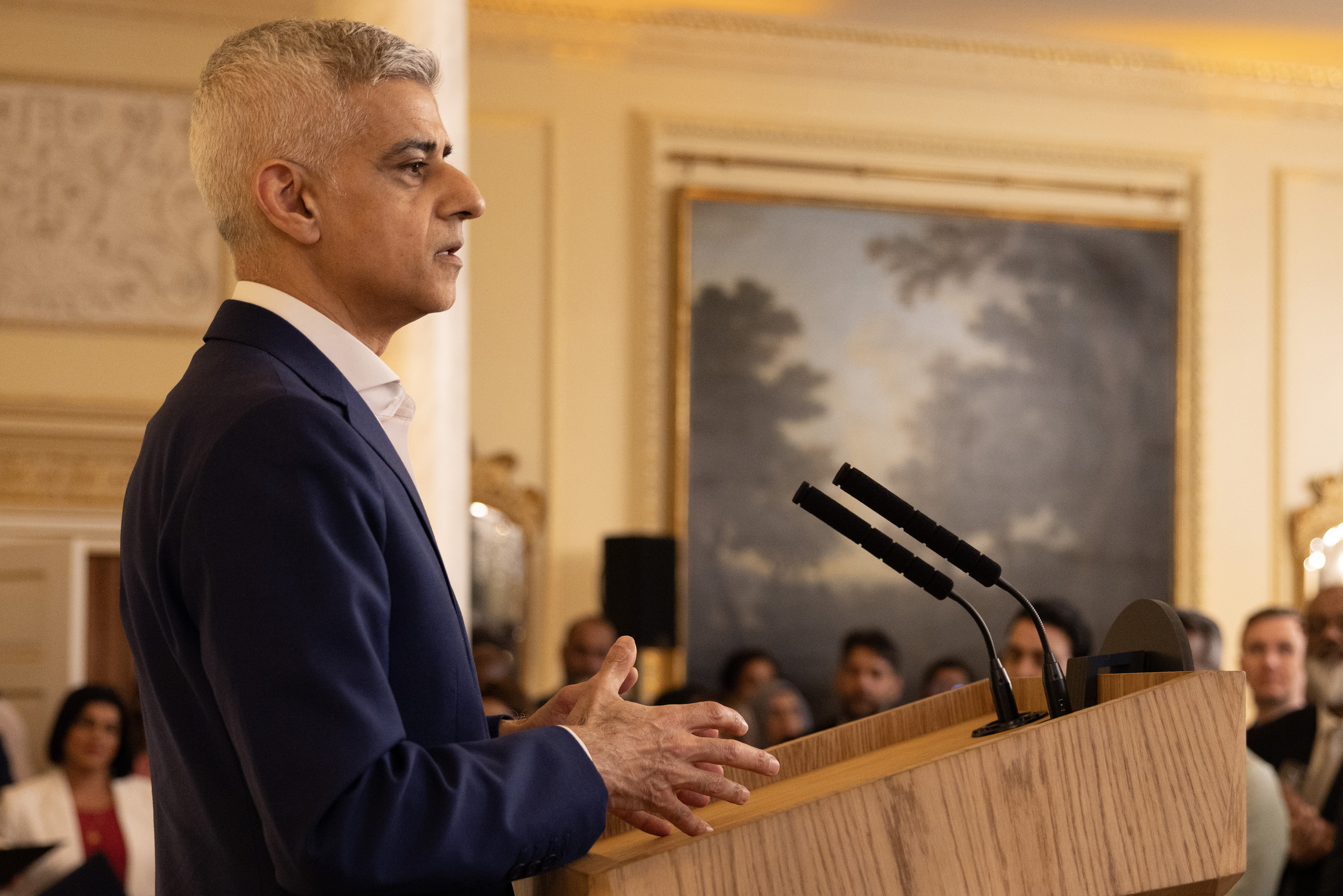
Khan speaks at an Eid event at 10 Downing Street in April 2025

While fasting for the Islamic holy month of Ramadan in 2016, Khan declared that he would use the period as an opportunity to help "break down the mystique and suspicion" surrounding Islam in Britain and help to "get out there and build bridges" between communities, organising iftars to be held at synagogues, churches, and mosques. He then appeared at a Trafalgar Square celebration of Eid al-Fitr, endorsing religious freedom and lambasting "criminals who do bad things and use the name of Islam to justify what they do". Following the 2016 Orlando nightclub shooting, Khan attended a vigil in Old Compton Street, Soho, and insisted that he "will do everything in [his] power to ensure that LGBT Londoners feel safe in every part of our city"; later that month he marched in the LGBT Pride London parade.

In June 2020, during the George Floyd protests in the United Kingdom, protesters sprayed graffiti on the Statue of Winston Churchill, Parliament Square over two successive days, including, following the inscription "Churchill", the words "was a racist". As a result, Khan announced that he had ordered the statue to be temporarily covered up to preserve it from further vandalism.

On 9 June 2020, in response to the unrest, Khan said that he believed some statues of slavers in London "should be taken down", and established the Commission for Diversity in the Public Realm. The commission has been tasked with reviewing London's statues, street names, monuments, sculptures, artworks and other landmarks, with the potential for removal. The commission is in response to the anti-racist protests which saw protesters topple a Statue of Edward Colston in Bristol, while also defacing a number of statues across the country. That evening the statue of Robert Milligan, a merchant and slave trader, outside the Museum of London Docklands was removed by the local authority and the Canal & River Trust.

On 11 June 2020, a joint statement from the Guy's and St Thomas' NHS Foundation Trust announced that the Statue of Robert Clayton, together with that of Thomas Guy, would be removed from public view and that they would work with Khan on the issue.

==== Transport policies ====
Khan has made significant reforms on transport. He immediately announced the introduction of a "Hopper" bus ticket which would allow a passenger to take two bus and tram journeys within an hour for the price of one; it was intended to benefit those on low incomes most. In January 2018, this system was upgraded to offer unlimited journeys and allowing travel on Tube or rail services in between. In June 2016, Khan announced that his electoral pledge to prevent transport fare rises would only apply to "single fares" and pay as you go fares, and not daily, monthly, weekly, or yearly railcards; he was widely criticised for this. That same month, he ordered TfL to ban any advertising on its network that was deemed to body shame or demean women. In July he urged the government to allow TfL to take control of the failing Southern rail service, and in August launched the 24-hour Night Tube service on Fridays and Saturdays, an idea initially proposed by Johnson.

Khan backed expansion of London City Airport, removing the block on this instituted by Johnson's administration; environmentalist campaigners like Siân Berry stated that this was a breach of Khan's pledge to be London's "greenest ever" mayor. Opposing expansion at Heathrow Airport, he urged Prime Minister Theresa May to instead support expansion at Gatwick Airport, stating that to do so would bring "substantial economic benefits" to London.

In August 2020, Khan announced that Crossrail, a project to create the new Elizabeth line east–west rail link through the centre of London, had been delayed again until 2022, requiring an additional £1.1 billion in funding to complete the project. The line was originally due to open in 2018.

Khan supported the Sutton Link TramLink, a tram extension project that is part of his London Plan for 2021. However, the project is on hold since 2020 due to COVID-19 funding issues and has been challenged by Conservative MP Paul Scully for imposing the ULEZ charge on Sutton residents without better transport alternatives.

==== COVID-19 pandemic and government bailout ====
During the COVID-19 pandemic in 2020, Khan was criticised by Health Secretary Matt Hancock for closing stations and reducing services on the tube network, which Hancock believed would result in overcrowding and put key workers travelling to work at risk. On 17 March 2020 Khan announced the London Underground would begin running a reduced service due to the virus. Khan shut down the Waterloo & City line, several tube stations and the Night Tube. From 20 March 40 tube stations were closed.

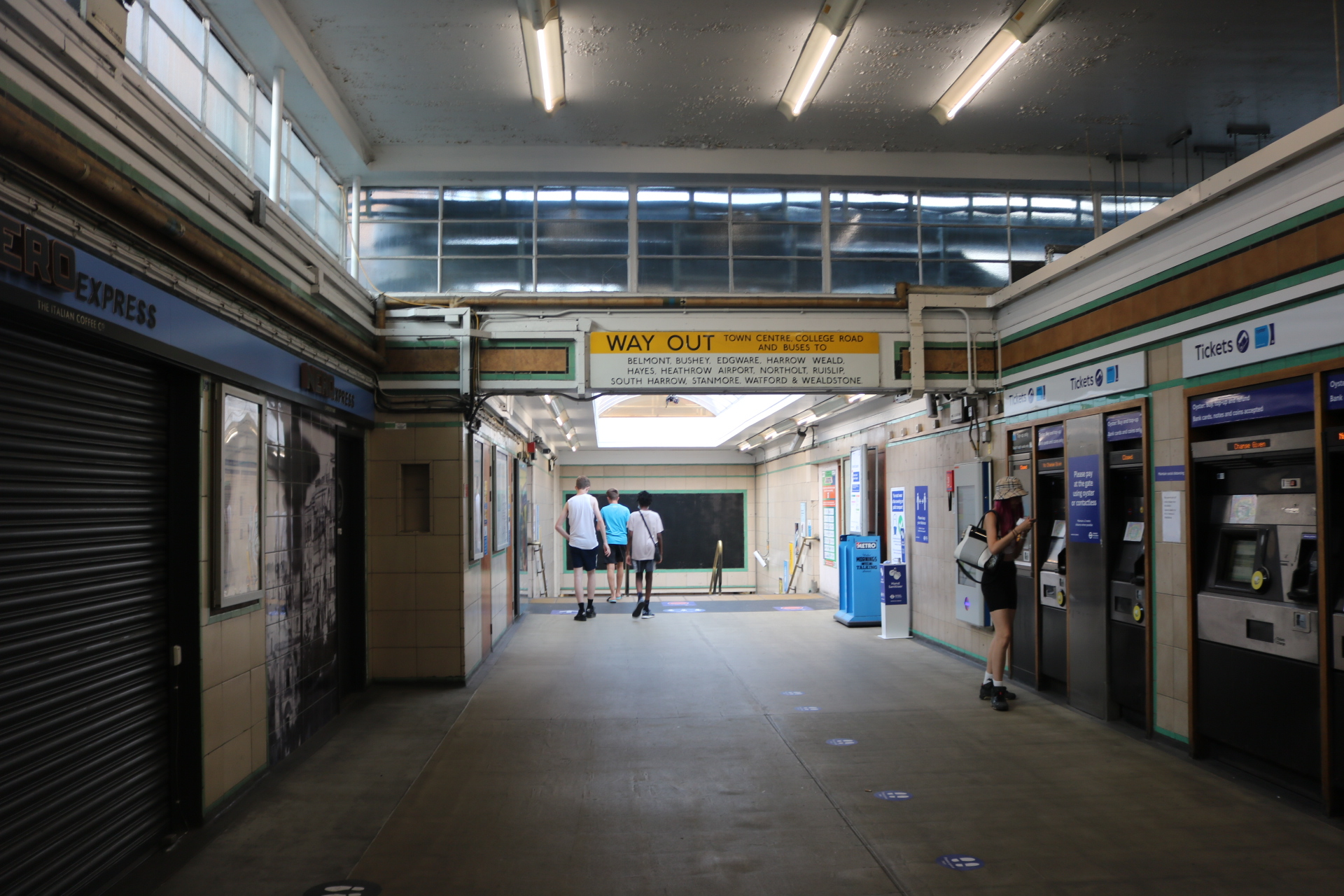
Harrow-on-the-Hill station deserted during the pandemic in August 2020

Khan was the first British political leader to call for face masks to be worn in public in April 2020. On 22 April, Khan warned that TfL could run out of money to pay staff by the end of the month unless Boris Johnson's government stepped in. Two days later, TfL announced it was furloughing around 7,000 employees, about a quarter of its staff, to help mitigate a 90% reduction in fare revenues.

On 7 May, Transport for London, the capital's transport authority which Khan chairs, requested a £2 billion government bail-out to keep services running until September 2020. Without an agreement with the government, deputy mayor for transport Heidi Alexander said TfL might have to issue a "Section 114 notice" – the equivalent of a public body going bust. On 14 May, Khan and UK Government agreed a £1.6 billion emergency funding package to keep Tube and bus services running. To achieve the bailout package, Khan had to raise TfL fares by 1% above inflation, which went against a pledge he made during his mayoral election campaign to not increase fares. Transport Secretary Grant Shapps MP blamed Khan for the "poor condition of TfL's financial position" during his four years as Mayor.

From 22 June 2020, Khan has implemented an increase in the London Congestion Charge to £15 a day, from £11.50. Its hours of operation have also been extended to 7am–10pm every day, including weekends. Despite the COVID-19 pandemic, teachers, police officers, firefighters and transport workers are also included in the charge, despite a campaign by the Metropolitan Police Federation to exempt them.

Khan began discussing with local leaders plans for further restrictions in London in late September 2020, and delivered a plan to the central government to introduce measures to curb the worsening outbreak and called for a "circuit-breaker lockdown" of London on 13 October 2020, citing advice from the Scientific Advisory Group for Emergencies (SAGE). The plan was not used; a second national lockdown was not introduced until 31 October. He declared a "major incident" due to a need for emergency coordination to mitigate the major strain on London's healthcare system in January 2021.

According to polling in March 2021, 42% of Londoners agreed that Khan had handled COVID-19 "well", and 39% "badly".

In July 2021, Khan maintained a face mask requirement on London transport, despite the government removing the requirement nationwide, citing the risk of virus transmission. He later expressed frustration at the subsequent fall in compliance and TfL staff's inability to enforce these rules, and said he would lobby the government to introduce legal backing for the rule.

==== Housing policies ====
In his first weeks as Mayor, Khan criticised foreign investors for treating homes in London as "gold bricks for investment", instead urging them to invest in the construction of "affordable homes" for Londoners through a new agency, Homes for Londoners, which would be funded by both public and private money. Homes for Londoners is governed by a board and chaired by Khan.

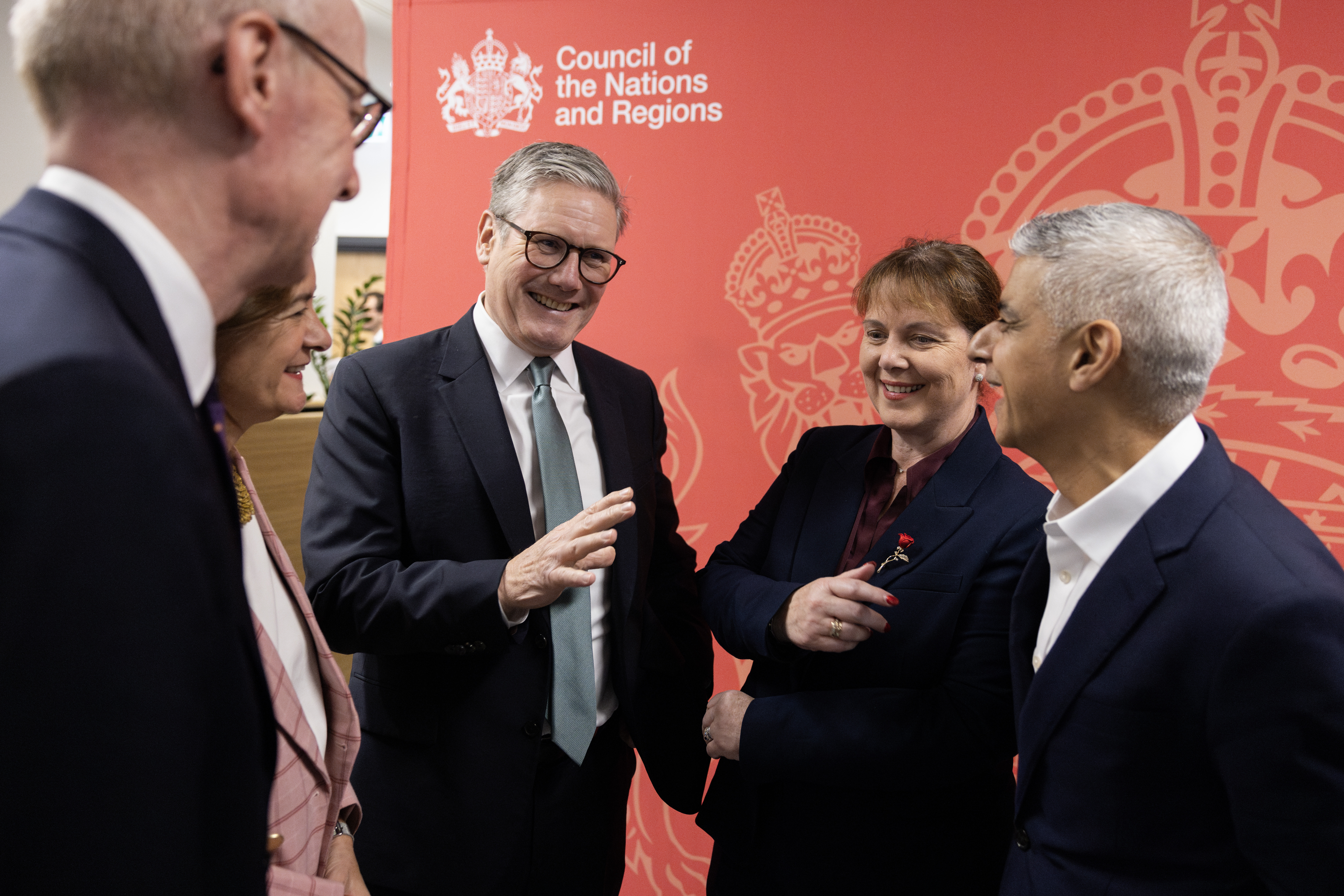
Khan with British Prime Minister Keir Starmer in October 2024

However, in contrast to one of his pre-election statements, he revealed that he no longer supported rent freezes in the city. By 2022, Khan had reverted to supporting rent freezes.

Khan vetoed the construction of a football stadium and two blocks of flats on Green Belt land in Chislehurst, after the plan had already been supported by Bromley Council, insisting that he would "oppose building on the Green Belt, which is now even more important than when it was created".

Khan launched a "No Nights Sleeping Rough" taskforce to tackle youth homelessness in London in October 2016.

==== Air pollution ====
Khan has called air pollution "the biggest public health emergency of a generation." In October 2017, he introduced the Toxicity Charge (T-charge); operating within the same hours and zone as the London congestion charge, the T-Charge levied a £10 fine on top of that for older and more polluting vehicles (typically diesel and petrol ones registered before 2006) that do not meet Euro 4 standards. In that same year, he announced plans to establish a replacement: an "Ultra Low Emission Zone (ULEZ)" that would charge owners of the most polluting cars a fine of £12.50 per day on top of the congestion charge. The all day, every day (except on Christmas Day) zone was introduced in 2019 in Central London, extended to the North and South Circulars in 2021, and was extended to the whole of Greater London in August 2023. The charge applies to diesel cars and vans whose engines aren't at the latest Euro 6 standard as well as most petrol cars pre-2005; in addition, non-compliant buses, coaches and lorries must pay £100. The initial zone resulted in a drop of the worst polluting vehicles entering the zone each day from 35,578 in March 2019 to 26,195 in April after the charge was introduced.

Khan criticised the UK government in June 2017 for its lack of drive in improving general air quality. He stated that the government's action plan on the issue lacked "serious detail, fails to tackle all emission sources, such as from buildings, construction or the river, and does not utilise the government's full resources and powers", reflecting its low prioritisation of the issue in the past.

In September, he announced that the first 50 air quality audits for primary schools in the worst-polluted areas of the city had been launched with the objective to reduce air pollution around a steadily increasing number of schools. The audits will continue until the end of 2017, with reports being published in 2018.

Khan overseeing the construction of the Silvertown Tunnel, a tunnel under the Thames in Greenwich, which his office claims is needed to relieve traffic congestion. However, environmentalists say it will induce more demand and lead to worsening air quality and car dependency, leading the Green Party, Liberal Democrats, some Conservatives, and even some Labour MPs and mayors to come out against the project. In July 2021, the London Labour regional conference called for the tunnel to be scrapped, by 74% to 26%. The tunnel opened in April 2025.

==== Crime and policing ====
Since Khan became Mayor, overall crime rates in London increased in every reporting year to 2020, before falling dramatically during the COVID-19 pandemic, and then slowly returning to 2019 levels by 2024. In 2018, London was reported to be "experiencing an upsurge in serious violent crime, particularly among teenagers and young men, although it is not at the levels seen in the mid-2000s". In figures released by the Office for National Statistics (ONS), crime in London was five times higher than the rest of the United Kingdom in 2019. A report that London crime had risen five times faster than the rest of the country since Sadiq Khan became Mayor in 2016 was debunked by the independent fact checker Full Fact.

These trends largely follow national ones. In 2024, the Crime Survey for England and Wales shows that “someone is actually less likely to be a victim of crime in London than they are across the country as a whole.”

Killings using a blade saw a 28 per cent increase from 67 in 2018 to 86 in 2019. There was 54% increase in knife crime from 9,086 in the year ended 31 March 2016, just before Khan was elected Mayor, to 14,000 in the year ended 30 September 2023. London's murder rate reached a ten-year high in 2019. The Metropolitan police recorded 149 homicides that year. In five years the homicide rate had increased by more than 50%, from 94 cases in 2014. The reasons cited were drugs, austerity and a nationwide rise in violence. The murder rate, lower than in most rural areas of the UK, fell dramatically after 2020. Gun crime in the capital dropped under Khan, reaching a low in 2024, with gun crime rates far higher in urban areas of the UK outside London.

Antisocial behaviour peaked in 2019 before falling; it was less common on 2024 than elsewhere in the UK.

In an interview with LBC, Khan accepted responsibility for rising crime in London as the Police and Crime Commissioner for the city, but blamed budgetary cuts by the UK Conservative Government. Khan stated that knife crime is "rising at an unacceptably high rate" across London, England, and Wales, and that it is "clearly a national problem that requires national solutions." Following the 2019 London Bridge stabbing Khan stated, "You can't disaggregate terrorism and security from cuts made to resources of the police, of probation, the tools that judges have … The key thing is we need to support the police and security service. (...) The point I am making is we can be safer, with more police and more resources." Since October 2023, the Met Police has made hundreds of arrests in connection with pro-Palestinian protests in London, including in relation to suspected hate crimes and offences involving support for proscribed organisations. The Met Police recorded more than 500 antisemitic incidents between October and November 2023. On 16 March 2024, Khan announced £875,000 for grassroots projects addressing hate, intolerance, extremism, radicalisation and terrorism.

Following the 2024 UK riots, Khan criticised the Online Safety Act 2023 as "not fit for purpose" and called for it to be strengthened.

In May 2026, Khan blocked a proposed £50 million, two-year contract between the Metropolitan Police and Palantir. The Mayor's Office for Policing and Crime cited concerns over the procurement process and value for money, while a briefing from Khan’s team raised “concerns about using public money to support firms who act contrary to London’s values”. Palantir subsequently launched a High Court challenge, arguing that its values and ethics had been unlawfully taken into account. Met Commissioner Sir Mark Rowley warned that blocking the deal could put around 500 planned staff reductions at risk and lead to cuts affecting up to 700 frontline posts. Khan’s emails and other communications are also being searched as part of the proceedings.

In May 2026, while Sadiq Khan was Mayor of London, the Met Police established a 100-officer Community Protection Team following a series of arson attacks targeting Jewish sites and a double stabbing in Golders Green that was being treated as terrorism-related. The Community Protection team combined neighbourhood policing, specialist protection and counter-terrorism capabilities. It initially focused on protecting Jewish communities across London amid heightened concerns over antisemitism, while the Met Police said the model could also be used to support other communities facing increased hate-crime risks.

==== Email abuse ====
In February 2025, a man was jailed for 28 weeks and made subject to a restraining order after pleading guilty to sending malicious emails to Khan, Jess Phillips, and a senior officer in the Metropolitan police.

== Political views and positions ==
Writing for The Spectator, the political commentator Nick Cohen described Khan as a centre-left social democrat, while the journalist Amol Rajan termed him "a torch-bearer for the social democratic wing" of the Labour Party. The BBC describe Khan as being located on the party's soft left. In an article for Al Jazeera, the writer Richard Seymour described Khan as a centrist, while Matt Wrack, the General Secretary of the Fire Brigades Union, characterised Khan as belonging to "that part of the Labour Party that was in government under Blair and Brown". The journalist Dave Hill described Khan as a social liberal.

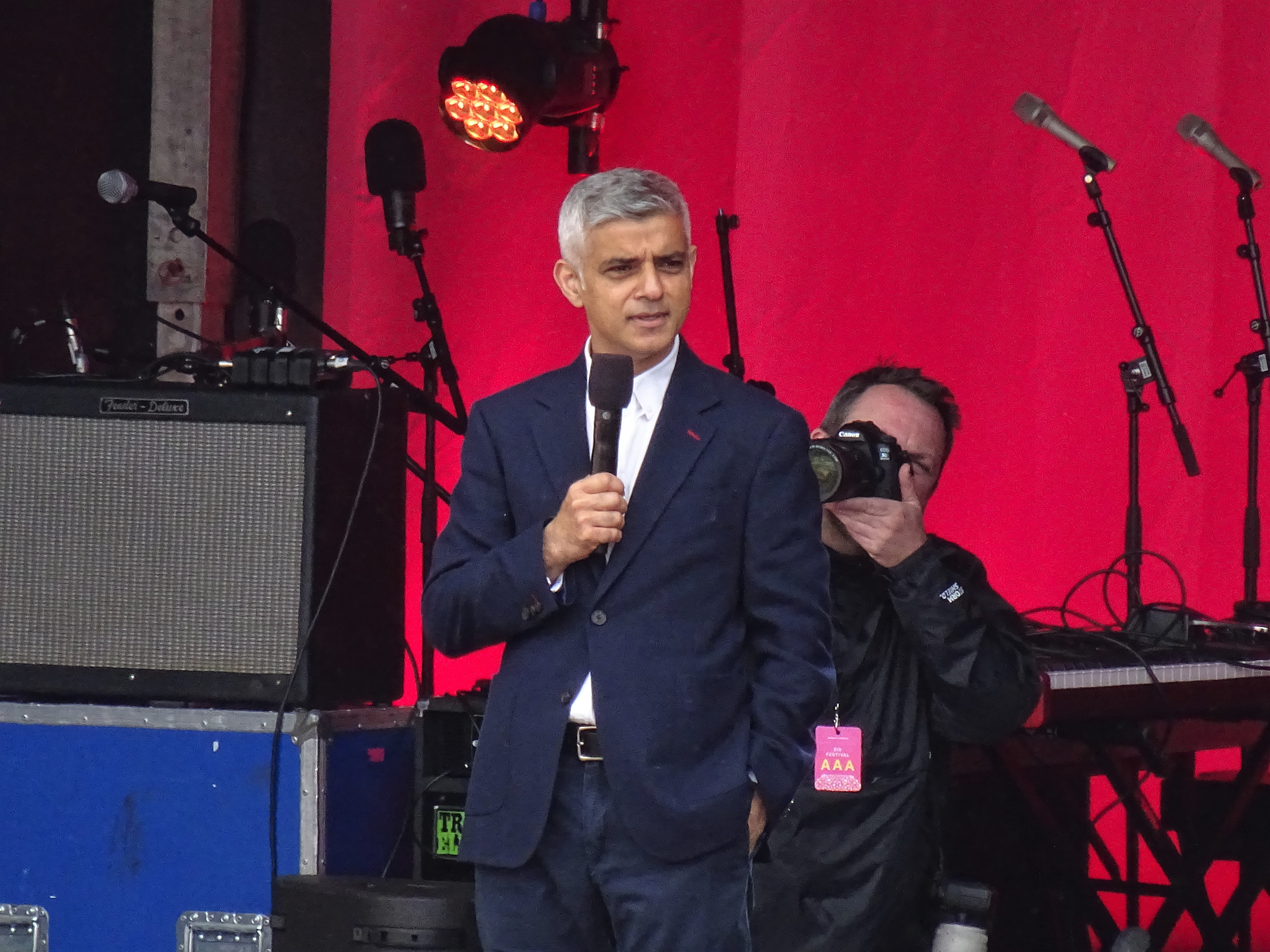
Khan at a 2019 Eid al-Fitr event in Trafalgar Square, London

Khan has described himself as a "proud feminist". In April 2019, Khan joined the Jewish Labour Movement. He criticised the Trump administration's decision to recognise Jerusalem as the capital of Israel. Khan said the British government should apologise for the Jallianwala Bagh massacre in British-ruled India. Khan condemned the plans for a protest march against Narendra Modi's government over India's treatment of Kashmir during the Hindu festival of Deepavali.

Khan quotes from the Quran and hadith when discussing terrorism. He received death threats from Islamic extremists after voting in favour of the Marriage (Same Sex Couples) Act. He was also threatened by the far-right group Britain First, which in 2016 threatened to take "direct action" against Khan where he "lives, works and prays" as part of an anti-Muslim campaign.

In 2009, Khan referred to some Muslims as "Uncle Toms", a derogatory label for a person of an oppressed minority who betrays them to benefit from their oppressors. In 2016, Khan said "I regret using the phrase...and I am sorry."

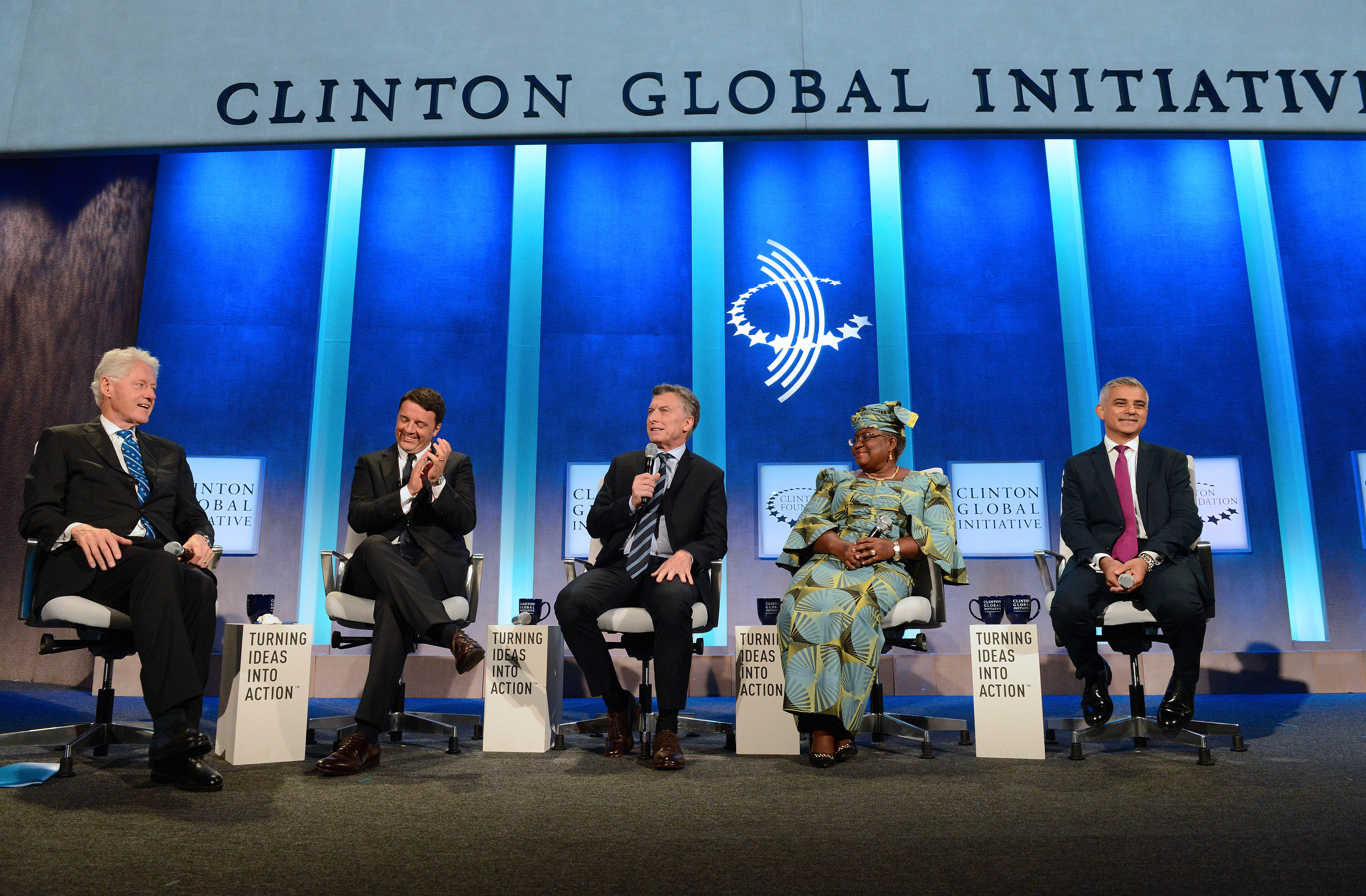
Khan with former president Bill Clinton at the Clinton Global Initiative, September 2016

Journalist Dave Hill has said that Khan was "savvy, streetwise and not averse to a scrap", while also describing him as having a "joshing, livewire off-stage personality" which differed from the formal image he often projected while onstage. Khan used to perform comedy before running for Mayor, including a ten-minute money-raising Stand Up for Labour routine. Comedian Arthur Smith stated that Khan could become a "good club-level comedian one day". During the 2016 Mayoral campaign, Goldsmith referred to Khan as "a caricature machine politician... the sort of politician who justified peoples' mistrust in politics", as evidence citing Khan's U-turn on supporting Heathrow expansion. Another rival in the 2016 Mayoral campaign, George Galloway of the Respect Party, referred to Khan as a "flip-flop merchant" and a "product of the Blairite machine".

There has been an ongoing political feud between Khan and US president Donald Trump since 2016, when Khan criticised Trump over his proposed "Muslim ban" and Trump responded by attacking Khan a number of times on Twitter over the next several years. Shortly before Trump's 2019 state visit to the UK, Khan compared Trump to "European dictators of the 1930s and 40s". Upon arrival, Trump responded on Twitter by calling him a "stone-cold loser" and compared him to another mayor he also targeted, Bill de Blasio. On 9 June 2020, Khan said that he believed some statues of slavers in London "should be taken down", and established the Commission for Diversity in the Public Realm to do so.

On 13 October 2023, during the Gaza war, Khan urged Israel to exercise restraint, arguing that a blockade of the Gaza Strip could lead to "suffering" among Palestinian civilians. On 27 October 2023, he further called for a ceasefire. He was criticised by Jewish figures, including the UK Chief Rabbi Ephraim Mirvis, who stated that "a ceasefire now would be an irresponsible stepping stone to yet more Hamas terrorist brutality". In a later interview with Mehdi Hasan, Khan appeared to suggest that the Chief Rabbi's criticisms of him had an Islamophobic motive. Khan stated: "I'd ask those Jewish people to just pause and reflect on their response to me calling for a ceasefire ... what motivated them to come out in the way they did against the Mayor of London, and the Mayor of Greater Manchester – I'll give you a clue, he's not called 'Ahmed Bourani', he's called Andy Burnham, whereas I'm called Sadiq Khan." Khan apologised for the remarks a day after the footage was released, stating: "At times it is clear to me, and others, that as a mayor of London of Islamic faith, I am held to a different standard and that can be frustrating – particularly during a divisive election campaign. But, it wasn't fair of me to have levelled that frustration at the Chief Rabbi." In September 2025, Khan called out the Israeli government for committing genocide in Gaza.

In October 2025, Khan sparked controversy for suggesting that the chant "from the river to the sea" at pro-Palestinian marches, which critics say calls for the dismantlement of Israel, was not inherently antisemitic. He was criticised by shadow home secretary Chris Philp, who said: "Calling for the complete destruction of Israel, a state established with UN approval, is a hateful and extremist message". Shadow community secretary James Cleverly added that the slogan "calls for wiping the world’s only Jewish state from the map […] Sadiq Khan has once again let the capital’s Jewish community down". Labour Against Anti-Semitism co-director Alex Hearn stated: "For two years, Sadiq Khan's London has been the scene of marches which have given a platform for virulent anti-Jewish racism and threatened the peace and safety of the Jewish community," adding that "listening to Jewish voices calling out this hateful chant would be a good place for him to start to undo the damage."

== Legacy and honours ==
In 2009, he became a Member of Her Majesty's Most Honourable Privy Council. This entitled him to the honorific "The Right Honourable" for life. Six months after his election as the MP for Tooting, The Spectator awarded Khan Newcomer of the Year.

Khan was nominated for the Politician of the Year Award at the British Muslim Awards in January 2013 and 2015 and won the award in February 2016. In late 2016 and 2017, Khan won and accepted the British GQ's Politician of the Year Award. In 2017, he was awarded an honorary doctorate from the University of Law. In 2018, Khan was conferred Sitara-e-Pakistan for his services to British Pakistanis by the Pakistani President Mamnoon Hussain. In 2018, he became an Honorary Fellow of the Royal Institute of British Architects. Khan was included in the 2018 Time 100 list of most influential people in the world.

In 2019, Khan became an Honorary Bencher of the Middle Temple. In 2024, Khan won and accepted the Local Government Award at EPG's Political and Public awards at the House of Commons. Khan was made a Knight Bachelor in the 2025 New Year Honours for political and public service. He is the first and only mayor of Greater London to be knighted. Khan was nominated for a life peerage in July 2026 by outgoing prime minister Sir Keir Starmer.

== Personal life ==
Khan is a practising Muslim who observes the fast during Ramadan and regularly attends Al-Muzzammil Mosque in Tooting. Journalist Dave Hill described him as "a moderate, socially liberal Muslim". Khan has expressed the view that "too often the people who are 'representing' the Islamic faith aren't representative, they're angry men with beards. And that is not what Islam is about." Khan also performed hajj in 2026.

Khan married Saadiya Ahmed, a fellow solicitor, in 1994. They have two daughters, both raised in the Islamic faith. He is a supporter of Liverpool F.C.

== Notes ==
Parliament of the United Kingdom
Preceded by Tom Cox	Member of Parliament for Tooting; 2005–2016	Succeeded by Rosena Allin-Khan
Political offices
Preceded by Parmjit Dhanda	Parliamentary Under-Secretary of State for Communities and Local Government; 2008–2009	Succeeded by Shahid Malik
Preceded by The Lord Adonis	Minister of State for Transport; 2009–2010	Succeeded by Theresa Villiers
Preceded by The Lord Adonis	Shadow Secretary of State for Transport; 2010	Succeeded by Maria Eagle
Preceded by Jack Straw	Shadow Secretary of State for Justice; 2010–2015	Succeeded by The Lord Falconer of Thoroton
Preceded by Jack Straw	Shadow Lord Chancellor; 2010–2015	Succeeded by The Lord Falconer of Thoroton
Preceded by Tessa Jowell	Shadow Minister for London; 2013–2015	Succeeded by None
Preceded by Boris Johnson	Mayor of London; 2016–present	Incumbent
Party political offices
Preceded by Anne Campbell	Chair of the Fabian Society; 2008–2010	Succeeded by Suresh Pushpananthan
