= R (on the application of Farrakhan) v Secretary of State for the Home Department =

Challenge to the ban on Louis Farrakhan entering the United Kingdom

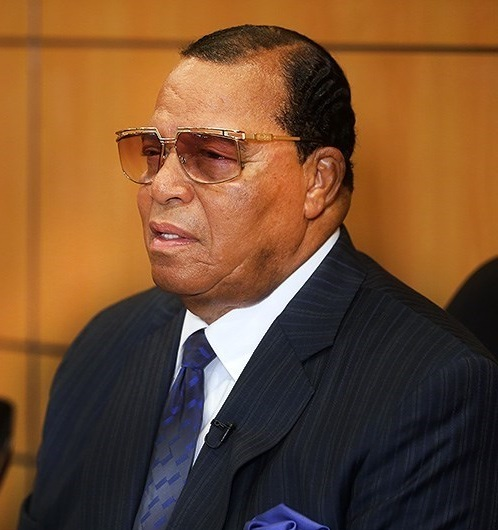
Louis Farrakhan challenged a ban on his entry into the United Kingdom.

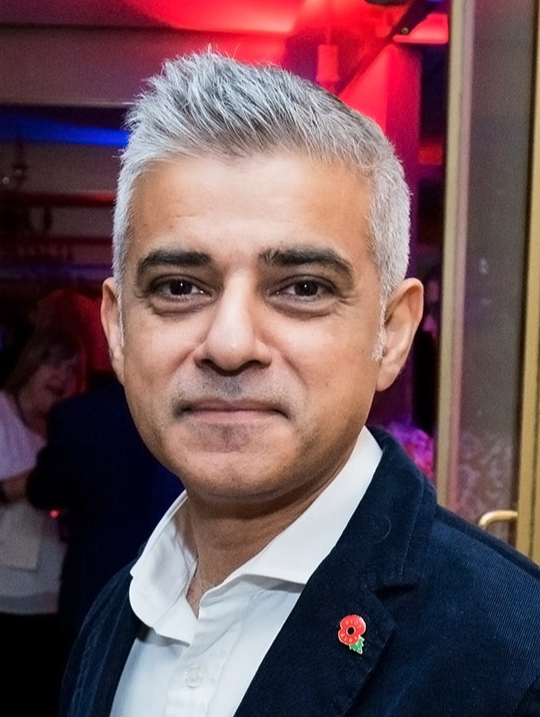
Sadiq Khan, later Mayor of London, was Farrakhan's solicitor.

R (on the application of Farrakhan) v Secretary of State for the Home Department (legal citation [2002] EWCA Civ 606) was a challenge by way of judicial review to the ban on Louis Farrakhan entering the United Kingdom. The ban was imposed on Farrakhan, the leader of the black separatist Nation of Islam in the United States, in 1986. He sought to overturn the ban in 2001, relying on the provisions of the Human Rights Act 1998, and was initially successful in the Administrative Court of the High Court of Justice – the first time that an exclusion order had been successfully challenged in court.

The British government appealed and in 2002 the Court of Appeal overturned the earlier decision, reinstating the ban. Farrakhan's solicitor, Sadiq Khan, later became Mayor of London.

== Background ==
The Nation of Islam is an African-American religious group which was founded in the 1930s, came to prominence in the 1960s with members such as Muhammad Ali and Malcolm X, and came to prominence in the United Kingdom in the 1990s during the public inquiry that followed the murder of Stephen Lawrence. The group preaches self-reliance for black people, including segregation from other races. Farrakhan caused controversy in 1984 when he called Adolf Hitler a "great man" in an interview, and two years later he was banned from entering the UK; from the 1990s onwards he used more moderate rhetoric on race.

The Home Secretary is the only person who can ban a foreigner from entering the United Kingdom.

== Case ==
In March 2001, Farrakhan was granted permission by the High Court to challenge his exclusion from the UK, per the recently enacted Human Rights Act. Sadiq Khan, Farrakhan's solicitor, said that there was a double standard in that white supremacists had been allowed into the UK.

Mr Justice Turner, sitting in the Administrative Court (part of the Queen's Bench Division of the High Court), ruled in Farrakhan's favour in July 2001, but deferred giving his reasons for quashing the ban until 1 October 2001, during which time it remained in force. The ruling was condemned by Jewish figures in the UK: Greville Janner, chairman of the Holocaust Educational Trust, feared Farrakhan's potential impact amidst Jewish–Muslim conflict in the Middle East. Khan said that Farrakhan had visited Israel without any issues.

The government's appeal against the ruling was successful, and the decision of the High Court was overturned by the Court of Appeal in April 2002. The ruling was influenced by the legacy of the September 11 attacks, which had happened in the period between the judge's decision and the delivery of his judgment.

== Legacy ==
Khan later became a Labour Party politician. During his campaign in the 2016 London mayoral election, his Conservative rival Zac Goldsmith mentioned Khan's defence of Farrakhan as part of his campaign to portray Khan as a sympathiser to extremists. Khan told Jewish News that the nature of his profession as a human rights lawyer meant that he had to defend "unsavoury individuals" with whom he personally disagreed.
