= Douglas French =

British politician

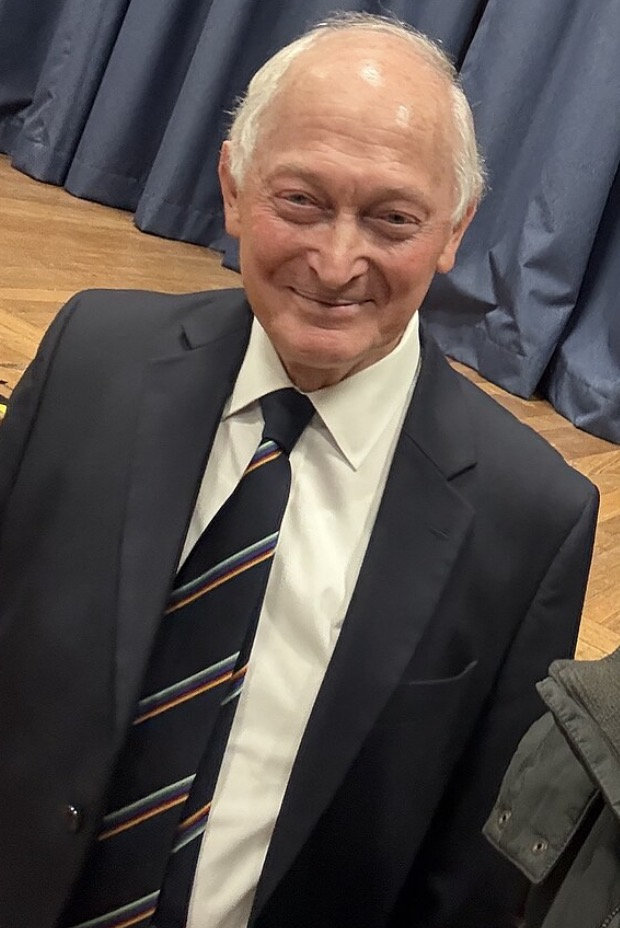
- French in November 2025

Member of Parliament for Gloucester
- In office 11 June 1987 – 8 April 1997
- Preceded by: Sally Oppenheim-Barnes
- Succeeded by: Tess Kingham

Personal details
- Born: 20 March 1944 (age 82)

Douglas Charles French (born 20 March 1944) is a retired Conservative Party politician in the United Kingdom.

== Political career ==
French was educated at Glyn Grammar School, Epsom and St Catharine's College, Cambridge. Having stood unsuccessfully for Sheffield Attercliffe in 1979, he was elected to the House of Commons at the 1987 general election as Member of Parliament for Gloucester, succeeding former minister Sally Oppenheim. He was re-elected at the 1992 general election, but was defeated at the 1997 general election by the Labour Party candidate, Tess Kingham.

Parliament of the United Kingdom
Preceded by Sally Oppenheim	Member of Parliament for Gloucester; 1987–1997	Succeeded by Tess Kingham
