= Sally Oppenheim-Barnes =

British politician (1928–2025)

The Right Honourable The Baroness Oppenheim-Barnes PC
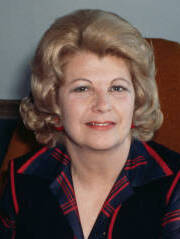
- Oppenheim-Barnes in 1979

Minister of State for Consumer Affairs
- In office 6 May 1979 – 4 March 1982
- Prime Minister: Margaret Thatcher
- Preceded by: John Fraser
- Succeeded by: Gerard Vaughan

Member of the House of Lords
- Lord Temporal
- Life peerage 9 February 1989 – 25 February 2019

Member of Parliament for Gloucester
- In office 18 June 1970 – 18 May 1987
- Preceded by: Jack Diamond
- Succeeded by: Douglas French

Personal details
- Born: Sarah Amelia Viner; 26 July 1928 Dublin, Ireland
- Died: 1 January 2025 (aged 96)
- Party: Conservative
- Spouse(s): Henry Oppenheim (m. 1949; died 1980) John Barnes (m. 1984)
- Children: 3, including Phillip

Sally Oppenheim-Barnes, Baroness Oppenheim-Barnes, PC (née Sarah Amelia Viner; 26 July 1928 – 1 January 2025) was a British Conservative politician.

== Early life ==
Born Sarah Amelia Viner to Jewish parents (whose original surname was spelled Veiner) in Dublin on 26 July 1928, she was raised and educated in Sheffield, where her father founded a steel and cutlery company. She attended Lowther College and worked as a social worker in London before entering politics. She changed her forename legally to "Sally" in 1968.

== Career ==
At the 1970 general election, she defeated Labour candidate Jack Diamond to represent the constituency of Gloucester for the Conservative Party; Diamond was the only cabinet minister to lose his seat at that election. She continued as Member of Parliament for Gloucester until 1987 and was Minister of State for Consumer Affairs in the Department of Trade between 1979 and 1982.

She chaired the National Consumer Council from 1987–89 and was later a vice-president of the National Union of Townswomen’s Guilds and chair of the National Waterways Museum.

Oppenheim-Barnes was created a life peer, as Baroness Oppenheim-Barnes of Gloucester in the County of Gloucestershire, on 9 February 1989. Her son Phillip Oppenheim is a former Conservative MP for Amber Valley. Between 1983 and 1987 mother and son served simultaneously in the House of Commons. On 25 February 2019, she retired from the House of Lords under the House of Lords Reform Act 2014.

== Personal life and death ==
In 1949, she married Henry Oppenheim, a property tycoon, with whom she had three children. Widowed in 1980, in 1984 she married her second husband, John Barnes. Oppenheim-Barnes died on 1 January 2025, at the age of 96.

Parliament of the United Kingdom
Preceded by Jack Diamond	Member of Parliament for Gloucester; 1970–1987	Succeeded by Douglas French
