= Alex McIntyre =

British politician

Alex McIntyre MP
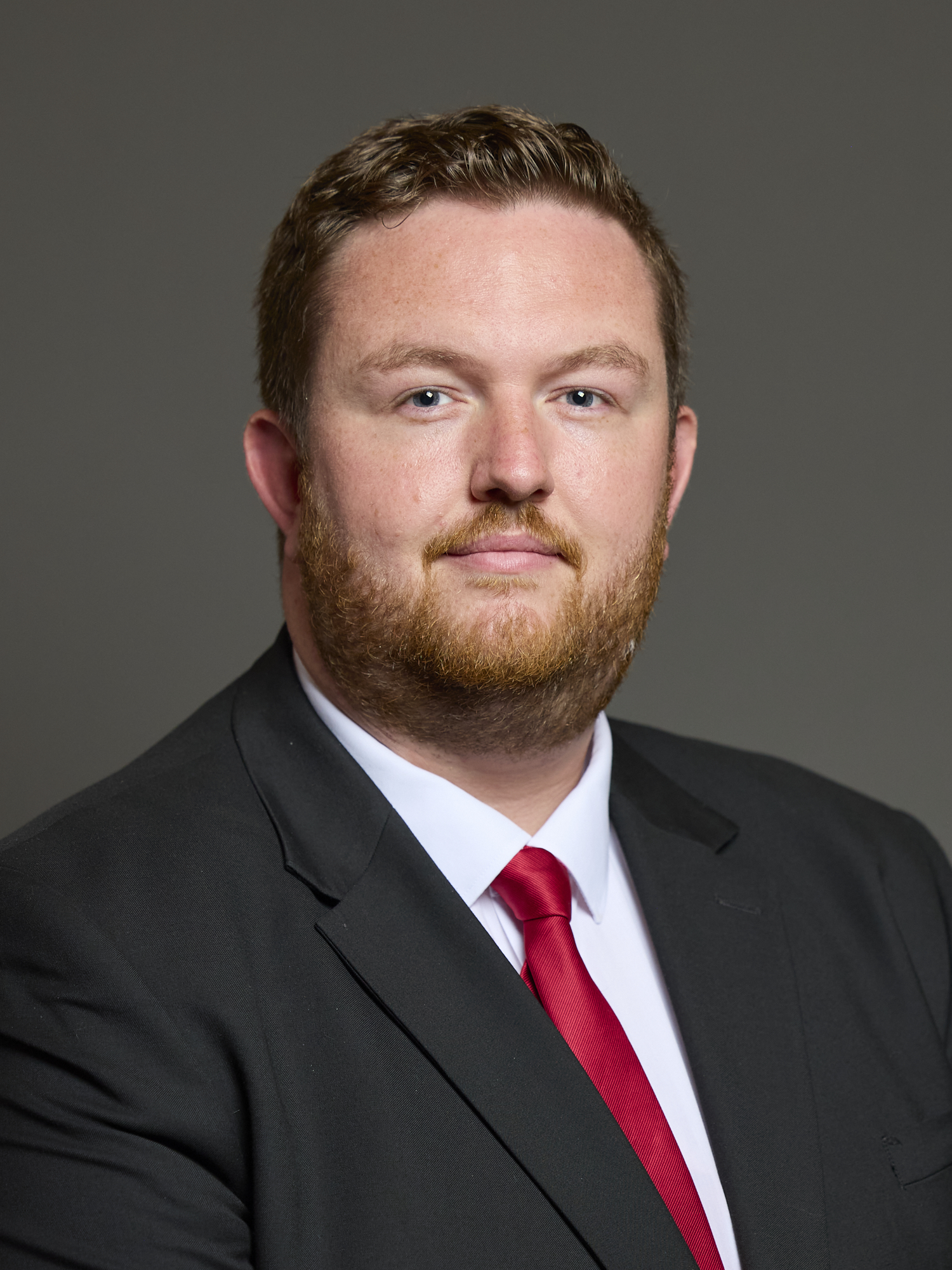
- Official portrait, 2024

Member of Parliament for Gloucester
- Incumbent
- Assumed office 4 July 2024
- Preceded by: Richard Graham
- Majority: 3,431 (7.5%)

Personal details
- Party: Labour
- Occupation: Politician; solicitor

Alexander Forbes McIntyre is a British Labour Party politician who has served as the Member of Parliament for Gloucester since 2024.

== Early career ==
In his early career, McIntyre was a solicitor and lawyer representing the NHS.

== Political career ==
McIntyre stood for the Labour Party in the 2024 general election for Gloucester, and defeated incumbent Conservative MP Richard Graham, with McIntyre obtaining 16,472 votes, with a majority of 3,431 votes.

== Personal life ==
McIntyre was born in Yorkshire, and attended Ermysted's Grammar School, a selective state school. McIntyre is a season ticket holder at Gloucester City A.F.C. and at Gloucester Rugby. He previously lived in Cam before he moved to Gloucester after being elected as an MP.
