= Tess Kingham =

British politician

Member of Parliament for Gloucester
- In office 1 May 1997 – 14 May 2001
- Preceded by: Douglas French
- Succeeded by: Parmjit Dhanda

Personal details
- Born: 4 May 1963 (age 63)
- Party: Labour
- Spouse: Mark Luetchford
- Education: Royal Holloway, University of London; University of East Anglia; University College London

Teresa Jane Kingham (born 4 May 1963) is a British Labour Party politician. She was Member of Parliament (MP) for Gloucester from 1997 to 2001.

== Biography ==
Kingham was educated at Dartford Grammar School for Girls, and gained a BA from Royal Holloway, University of London, a PGCE from the University of East Anglia and a master's degree in Egyptian Archaeology from University College London. She is currently studying for a PhD in Biological Anthropology at the University of Kent.

=== Political career ===
She ran as the Labour candidate for the European Parliament seat of the Cotswolds in 1994, but lost to the long-serving Conservative incumbent MEP, Henry Plumb, however she succeeded in cutting Plumb's majority from 45,678 in 1989 to just 4,268 at that election.

Kingham was elected as MP for Gloucester in 1997, but in May 2000 announced her retirement from Parliament in disillusionment after just one term, having complained publicly about the antiquated ways of working in the Palace of Westminster. She stood down from Parliament at the 2001 general election. She later expressed dissatisfaction with the old boys network in the House of Commons, accusing various members of "endlessly thrusting their groins around the Chamber in mock combat" and "indulging in yah-boo nonsense, point-scoring and silly games". Whilst in Parliament, Kingham successfully campaigned to change laws to protect firefighters and to get a nationwide cystic fibrosis screening programme for newborn babies. She was a Member of the International Development Select Committee.

=== Private life ===
Kingham is married to Mark Luetchford, a civil servant, trustee of War on Want and author of "Waging the War on Want", the official history of the organisation. They have three children.

Parliament of the United Kingdom
Preceded by Douglas French	Member of Parliament for Gloucester; 1997–2001	Succeeded by Parmjit Dhanda
