= Richard Graham (politician) =

British politician (born 1958)

Richard Graham CMG
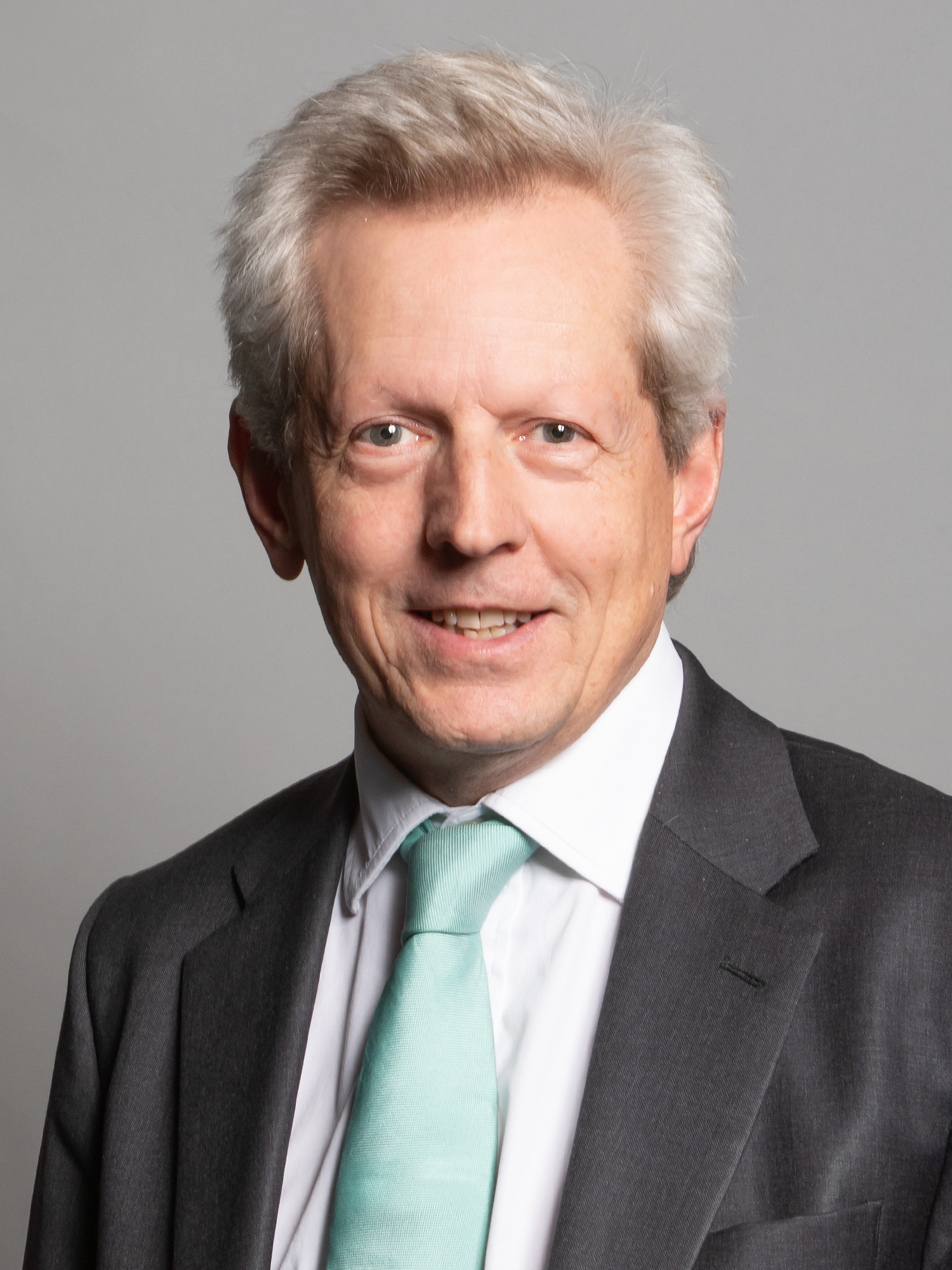
- Official portrait, 2019

Member of Parliament for Gloucester
- In office 6 May 2010 – 30 May 2024
- Preceded by: Parmjit Dhanda
- Succeeded by: Alex McIntyre

Personal details
- Born: 4 April 1958 (age 68)
- Party: Conservative
- Spouse: Anthea Graham
- Children: 3
- Education: Christ Church, Oxford
- Occupation: Diplomat, businessman, politician
- Website: Official website

Richard Michael John Ogilvie Graham CMG (born 4 April 1958) is a British politician and former diplomat who served as the Member of Parliament (MP) for Gloucester from 2010 to 2024. A member of the Conservative Party, he served as the British consul general in Macao from 1989 to 1992, prior to joining the banking sector.

== Early life and career ==
The grandson of the cricketer and British Army officer Ogilvie Graham, Graham was educated at Eton and Christ Church, Oxford where he was an exhibitioner in Modern History. Whilst at Oxford University, he was a Cadet with the Oxford University Air Squadron. Graham has played international squash and still plays cricket for Gloucester City Winget Cricket Club and the Gloucestershire Over 50s.

Graham was previously an airline manager, a diplomat and a pensions manager. He started with John Swire and Sons and became general manager of Cathay Pacific Airways in France at 24 and in the Philippines at 26, whilst also vice-chairman of the board of Airline Representatives. He joined the Foreign and Commonwealth Office in 1986; he was second and later first secretary at the British High Commission in Nairobi. He was later the British Trade Commissioner in China, first secretary at the British Embassy in Beijing and HM's consul in Macao (1989–1992). Graham joined Barings Bank as its Chief Representative China in 1993, before he became a director of Baring Asset Management in 1996.

He was previously a director of the charitable company Care for Children, which organises and trains foster parents for Chinese orphans.

Graham was elected as a Cotswold district councillor in 2003, becoming Chairman of the Overview and Scrutiny Committee in 2006. He unsuccessfully contested the Conservative Party Stroud Parliamentary nomination and the South West of England in the 2004 European elections.

=== International experience ===
Graham has lived and worked in ten countries and speaks eight languages: Indonesian, Cantonese, Mandarin, Tagalog, French, Malay, Swahili and English.

Graham was the first MP to speak Indonesian in the Chamber, when he spoke during PMQs on 10 October 2018 on the natural disaster at Palu in Indonesia's Sulawesi islands: "Teman yang membantu saat dibutuhkan adalah teman sebenarnya, a friend in need is a friend indeed".

== Parliamentary career ==
=== First parliament (2010–15) ===
In the run up to the 2010 general election, Graham was criticised by the incumbent Gloucester Labour MP Parmjit Dhanda and Stroud MP David Drew for using members and supporters of the foxhound pack Heythrop Hunt to campaign and leaflet on his behalf. Graham was elected with 39.9% of the vote and a majority of 2,420.

Following his election, Graham was a member of the Select Committee for Work and Pensions from May to November 2010, and since July 2015. In November 2012, Graham was appointed Prime Ministerial Trade Envoy to Indonesia.

In June 2010, his first debate in Parliament regarding apprenticeships and their importance to Gloucester was cancelled after both he and the apprenticeship minister arrived late. Graham later blamed a 'printer error'. Graham also apologised to the Serjeant at Arms in 2010 after he shared a photo taken of him in the House of Commons Chamber when it was not sitting with the Gloucester Citizen which also accompanied an article in that newspaper on his maiden speech. Photography is only permitted by the Speaker in exceptional circumstances.

In January 2013, Graham attracted criticism after suggesting to Gloucester Citizen that young women who wear high heels and short skirts put themselves at greater risk of rape. He said, "If you are blind drunk and wearing those clothes how able are you to get away?" Graham denied he was "victim blaming", saying that his comments were about "risk management".

Graham successfully campaigned for stronger dangerous driving sentencing laws in 2013 for those driving uninsured and under the influence of alcohol. In July 2015, he was banned from driving for six months at Stroud Magistrates Court after he was caught driving at 90 mph in a 70 mph speed limit on the A417 near Cirencester, in the Cotswolds on 14 December 2014. He already had nine points on his licence at the time so faced automatic disqualification. He was fined £525 with costs totalling £85 and a £53 victim surcharge. Consequently, he also had a road safety award withdrawn which he received from the charity Brake in January 2015.

In June 2013, he was advised by the Information Commissioner's Office that he was in breach of the Data Protection Act 1998 and the EU directive concerning Privacy and Electronic Communications (EC Directive) Regulations 2003 after sending political campaign emails to people who had contacted him on parliamentary business without first obtaining their permission.

In November 2014, a UK China Leadership Forum in China, led by Peter Mandelson and Ken Clarke, was cancelled at the last minute in sympathy with Graham after he was denied a visa to China following a Westminster debate on the pro-democracy protests in Hong Kong where he voiced his support for the protesters' human rights demands.

In April 2015, Graham was ordered by a judge to remove tweets that discussed a murder trial in Gloucester after the defendant's barrister accused him of "a clear attempt to win votes by ingratiating himself with his electors." The defendant was later found guilty of murder.

=== Second parliament (2015–17) ===
At the 2015 general election, Graham was re-elected with an increased vote share of 45.3% and an increased majority of 7,251. He apologised for parking his official campaign van in the County Council building car park disabled parking bay for 30 minutes during a memorial ceremony for police after a "37 hour day" following the election.

In May 2015, Graham was mocked on Twitter after taking a joke by David Schneider about YouGov Polls at face value.

In November 2015, Graham was accused of quoting Joseph Goebbels in defending a new surveillance bill with the words "if you've nothing to hide you have nothing to fear". The Independent pointed out that former Conservative Foreign Secretary William Hague had also used the same phrase in 2013 whilst Graham dismissed the argument as "clearly absurd" as Goebbels would have spoken in German.

In 2016, Graham was a member of the joint Select Committee which investigated the British Home Stores Pension Fund. He asked Sir Philip Green, who had responded angrily to previous questions about corporate governance, if he regarded the offshore company structure as appropriate for a modern UK company. Green did not answer directly, but said the structuring could have been more aggressive and others were jealous of his success. Graham addressed Philip Green on what he would do for pensioners and the latter committed to funding the deficit.

In January 2016, Graham launched the UKTI Education is GREAT campaign to increase engagement with British education in Malaysia. He was also appointed the Prime Ministerial Trade Envoy to Malaysia, the Philippines, and the ASEAN Economic Community.

Graham campaigned for a "Remain" vote during the 2016 EU membership referendum, and was later involved in informal talks regarding future Free Trade Agreements as the Prime Minister's Trade Envoy to the Philippines.

In May 2017, during a BBC interview regarding the benefits system, Victoria Derbyshire discussed Personal Independent Payments (PIPs) for disabled people with Graham and asked why some people with permanent degenerative conditions were being reassessed for their social security payment. Graham said: "Some conditions do degenerate, some stabilise, occasionally some do get better. It's a mixed situation" but did not clarify his remarks leading to criticism.

=== Third parliament (2017–19) ===
At the 2017 general election, Graham was re-elected with an increased share of the vote of 50.3%, but a reduced majority of 5,520 votes.

In March 2018, Graham voted in favour of changes for any parent of children in Year 3 and above earning more than £7,400 to be ineligible to claim free school meals.

In August 2018, Graham wrote in an online newsletter to his constituents that in order to increase recycling rates there would need to be an "education programme for immigrants not used to urban recycling", which drew criticism from opposition politicians, but he defended his comments as "entirely factual."

During a debate on Universal Credit on 15 October 2018 in the House of Commons, Graham raised concerns about the lack of data gathered about local food bank users. He said, "One of the difficulties with trying to correlate the people on universal credit with those who go to food banks is that there is no precise data to compare the two. I know anecdotally the number of foreigners claiming food bank vouchers is quite high". Opposition politicians criticised this, citing national Trussell Trust data.

During a Commons debate in December 2018 on Brexit and free movement, Graham mentioned a case of a pregnant "Young Gloucester girl who was badly beaten by her European boyfriend". Graham said that the girl was "terrified that when he comes out of prison he will return to haunt her and her family, because this country cannot deport European nationals unless they have served a sentence of longer than two years." One critic commented: "The situation Richard Graham mentioned is an obviously distressing case of domestic violence, and Richard Graham should know better than to exploit it by jumping on an anti-immigrant bandwagon to score political points." Graham later apologised to the House for his comments which he said were "clumsy".

=== Fourth parliament (2019–24) ===
At the 2019 general election, Graham was re-elected with an increased vote share of 54.2% and an increased majority of 10,277 after his rival Brexit Party candidate was withdrawn prior to the election.

Graham resigned as Prime Ministerial Trade Envoy to Malaysia, the Philippines and the ASEAN Economic Community on 7 July 2022, as part of the July 2022 government crisis, but was reinstated into the position in October, following the election of Rishi Sunak.

He was appointed Companion of the Order of St Michael and St George (CMG) in the 2023 New Year Honours for services to trade and investment in Southeast Asia.

During the lead up to the 2024 general election, a member of Graham's campaign team stole a Labour leaflet from a constituent's letterbox. He later apologised for the incident.

He was unseated by Labour's Alex McIntyre.

== Political positions ==
Graham is ideologically a one-nation conservative. During the 2019 Conservative Party leadership election, he backed Jeremy Hunt, and Rishi Sunak in the 2022 Conservative Party leadership election.

Graham supported calls by Rory Stewart for a national referendum on deciding which type of Brexit deal the government should pursue in 2019.

In May 2021, Graham criticised the actions of Israeli police against Muslim worshippers at the Temple Mount in Jerusalem, additionally describing Israeli evictions of Palestinians from Sheikh Jarrah as "illegal" during a debate in the House of Commons.

Graham openly criticised the sanctions placed upon MP Tom Tugendhat by the Chinese government as harmful for trade and investment agreements between China and Europe, stating that "it doesn’t achieve anything", and that "the perception of an authoritarian state trying to close down elected voices is not a good one".

== Campaigns and projects ==
=== Gloucester History Festival ===
In 2010, Graham created the first Gloucester History Festival and chairs the Gloucester History Committee. In 2018, it attracted 23,000 visitors to the city. He is also a trustee of the Gloucestershire Community Foundation, Patron of the Discover de Crypt project and an Honourable Member of the Showmen's Guild.

=== Transport ===
In October 2018, the Gloucester Transport Hub was opened after a £60m deal managed by Stanhope was agreed with Gloucester City Council to revamp the King's Square area. Graham also proposed a redevelopment on the railway station, with an additional new car park and access to the station from Great Western road, an improved underpass from Bruton Way to Great Western Road, and a new forecourt and exit onto Metz Way from the existing carpark, which was funded by the government after a successful bid. As of June 2019, the first stage of work has been completed with a new carpark, electric car charging points and rear entrance installed. The second stage however, which includes the underpass from Bruton Way has not been started.

=== Education ===
In February 2019, Graham along with Chancellor Philip Hammond and Alex Chalk MP formally opened the £5million School of Business and Technology at the University of Gloucestershire. The Vice Chancellor Stephen Marston spoke of the “massive contribution to Gloucester and its wellbeing”, whilst the Chancellor added that the investment brings “together academic and business expertise and ensure the students here today develop the skills they need to become the business leaders of the future.”

Graham along with Nic Dakin co-authored a letter to Chancellor of the Exchequer Philip Hammond seeking more funding for Further Education, which gained the support of 165 MPs from four parties represented in Parliament. He handed the letter over to the Chancellor and reiterated the main point that ‘while government policy has protected the incomes of schools and universities, colleges have been dealt an average funding cut of 30% over the last ten years. The Chancellor’s departmental spending review is a chance to announce an above inflation increase which would boost skills, productivity and social mobility.’

=== Stalking ===
Graham worked with Alex Chalk on extending the maximum penalty for stalking. They introduced a Private Member's Bill in 2016 calling for the limit to be doubled. The then justice minister Sam Gyimah thanked Graham for his "considerable efforts in highlighting this issue." and the law was changed in January 2017 through the Policing and Crime Bill.

Laura Richards, the founder and director of Paladin, the National Stalking Advocacy Service released this statement in support of the work of Graham. "This law change will allow Judges greater flexibility when sentencing stalkers and provide some respite for victims of stalking. This is about justice, ensuring better protection for victims as well as changing lives and saving lives. We are grateful to Alex Chalk MP and Richard Graham MP, as well as Baroness Jan Royall for tabling the amendment in the House of Lords."

=== Commonwealth servicemen ===
In March 2019, a cross party group of MPs led by Graham and Madeleine Moon wrote to Home Secretary Sajid Javid calling for the abolition of visa fees for commonwealth servicemen and women in the British Armed Forces. Graham said “These men and women are willing to put their life on the line for our country and the current situation doesn’t reflect our and the nation’s respect for them. The changes we propose are in line with the Armed Forces Covenant and would make a real difference to those who’ve shown such commitment to the UK.” On 5 June 2019 Sajid Javid announced the rule change which would allow soldiers from Commonwealth countries to bring families to Britain.

=== Gambling ===
Graham also campaigned for a gambling levy and greater protection for online gambling. On 24 April 2019, he presented a ten-minute rule bill which would require a review of a mandatory levy, for the first time, calling for "immediate and deep investment in research to analyse the extent of gambling addiction, including looking at all aspects of marketing and advertising by gambling companies."

=== Positions of trust ===
Since 2017, Graham campaigned for the Sexual Offences Act 2003 to extend the legislation on positions of trust (for whom it is forbidden to have sexual relations with anyone under 18) to include those who are coaching or training under-18-year-olds, particularly driving instructors or sports coaches.

Parliament of the United Kingdom
| Preceded by Parmjit Dhanda | Member of Parliament for Gloucester; 2010–2024 | Succeeded by Alex McIntyre |
