= Parmjit Dhanda =

British former Labour politician and public affairs executive

Parmjit Singh Dhanda
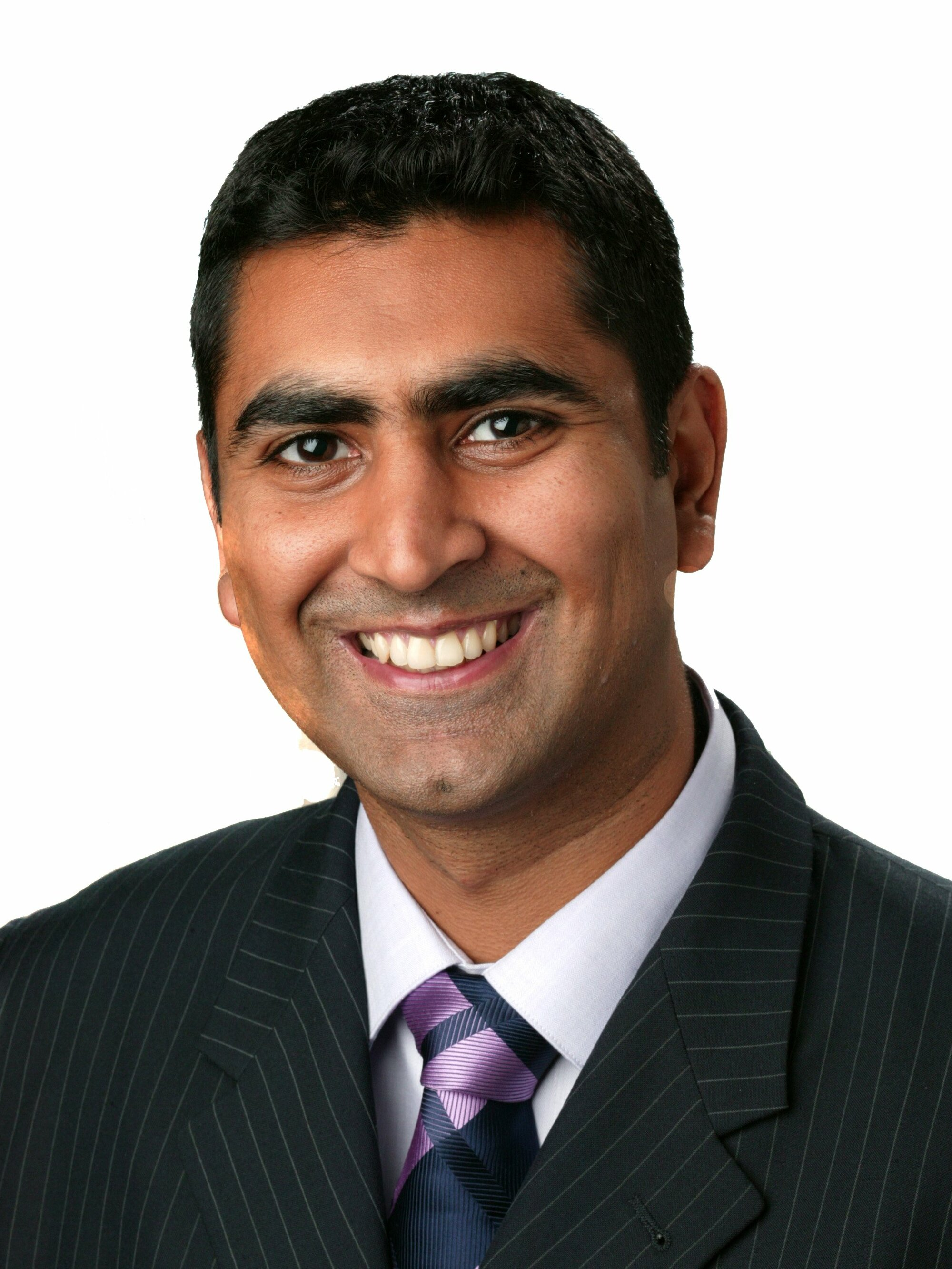
- Official portrait, 2007

Parliamentary Under-Secretary of State for Communities and Local Government
- In office 29 June 2007 – 5 October 2008
- Prime Minister: Gordon Brown

Parliamentary Under-Secretary of State for Education and Skills
- In office 5 May 2006 – 28 June 2007
- Prime Minister: Tony Blair

Member of Parliament for Gloucester
- In office 7 June 2001 – 6 May 2010
- Preceded by: Tess Kingham
- Succeeded by: Richard Graham

Personal details
- Born: Parmjit Singh Dhanda; 17 September 1971 (age 55) Hillingdon, London, England
- Party: Labour
- Spouse: Rupi Dhanda
- Children: 2
- Education: Mellow Lane Comprehensive School
- Alma mater: University of Nottingham

Parmjit Singh Dhanda (born 17 September 1971) is a British former Labour Party politician, public affairs executive and non-executive director. He was the Member of Parliament (MP) for Gloucester from 2001 to 2010 and served in the governments of Tony Blair and Gordon Brown. He was the first Sikh to serve as a minister in the British government.

Since leaving Parliament, Dhanda has worked in trade unions, healthcare, social housing and infrastructure. He has served as Executive Director of Back Heathrow, as the first independent chair of the Allied Health Professions Federation, as a non-executive director of Milton Keynes University Hospital NHS Foundation Trust, and on the boards of a number of housing and regeneration organisations.

== Early life and education ==
Dhanda was born in Hillingdon, west London, on 17 September 1971 and was brought up in Southall and Hayes. His parents came to Britain from Punjab in the 1960s. His father, Balbir, worked as a lorry driver and his mother, Satvinder, worked as a cleaner at Hillingdon and Ealing hospitals. His mother later became a trade union shop steward representing fellow hospital cleaners.

He attended Mellow Lane Comprehensive School in Hayes before studying electronic engineering at the University of Nottingham, followed by a master's degree in information technology.

After university, Dhanda worked for the Labour Party as a campaigns organiser in west London and the west of England, including during the 1997 general election. He subsequently worked for the Connect trade union.

In 1998 he was elected as a Labour councillor for the Yeading ward of Hillingdon Council. In 1999 he was a Labour candidate in the European Parliament election.

== Parliamentary career ==
Dhanda was selected as Labour's candidate for Gloucester following the decision of sitting MP Tess Kingham to stand down. At the 2001 general election he was elected with 22,067 votes and a majority of 3,880. He served as the MP for Gloucester from June 2001 until May 2010.

He made his maiden speech on 27 June 2001. During his first Parliament he served on the House of Commons Science and Technology Committee and the Joint Committee on Tax Law Rewrite Bills.

In March 2003, Dhanda was among the Labour MPs who voted against military action in Iraq. He supported an amendment stating that the case for war had not been established and subsequently voted against the government's main motion authorising military action.

Dhanda was appointed Parliamentary Private Secretary to Schools Minister Stephen Twigg in 2004. At the 2005 general election he retained Gloucester with 23,138 votes and a majority of 4,271.

He was appointed an Assistant Government Whip on 10 May 2005, serving until 5 May 2006.

=== Government minister ===
On 5 May 2006, Dhanda was appointed Parliamentary Under-Secretary of State at the Department for Education and Skills, with responsibilities including children, young people and families. He served in the post until 28 June 2007.

On 29 June 2007, following Gordon Brown's appointment as Prime Minister, Dhanda became Parliamentary Under-Secretary of State at the Department for Communities and Local Government. His responsibilities included community cohesion, race and faith policy, the fire and rescue service, local government, planning and infrastructure. He served until 5 October 2008.

Dhanda was the first Sikh to serve as a British government minister.

=== Gloucester regeneration ===
During his time as MP, Dhanda was closely involved in the regeneration of Gloucester's docks and surrounding areas. He was a founding board member of the Gloucester Urban Regeneration Company and was involved in negotiations between public bodies, developers and other organisations connected with the redevelopment of Gloucester Quays.

A peer-reviewed study of the Gloucester Quays regeneration published in 2023 concluded that the project had reached an impasse during its development and that Dhanda's intervention helped overcome barriers preventing it from proceeding. Interview evidence in the study described him as instrumental in moving projects forward and helping secure government support.

The wider regeneration programme included the Gloucester Quays development, a new Gloucestershire College campus and other public and private investment in the city.

=== Speaker election ===
In 2009, Dhanda stood in the election to succeed Michael Martin as Speaker of the House of Commons. He received 26 votes in the first ballot and was eliminated under the rules of the contest after receiving fewer than five per cent of votes cast.

=== 2010 general election ===
At the 2010 general election, Dhanda received 17,847 votes and lost Gloucester to Conservative candidate Richard Graham, who received 20,267 votes, a majority of 2,420.

== Career after Parliament ==
Following the 2010 general election, Dhanda worked as a senior trade union official, including as Parliamentary and Campaigns Officer for Prospect. He also developed a series of non-executive and board roles in housing, healthcare and regeneration.

In 2014, he commissioned research into the representation of ethnic minority communities in Parliament. Research conducted for Dhanda examined the ethnic composition of parliamentary constituencies and the representation provided by the main political parties.

=== Healthcare ===
Dhanda was the first independent chair of the Allied Health Professions Federation, serving from 2016 to 2019.

Contemporary evidence submitted to Parliament identifies Dhanda as chair of the federation and records its role in representing professional bodies for allied health professionals.

Dhanda was appointed a non-executive director of Milton Keynes University Hospital NHS Foundation Trust following approval by its Council of Governors in January 2017. The appointment was for a three-year term.

During his time at the trust, he was also a trustee and chair of Milton Keynes Hospital Charity.

=== Social housing and regeneration ===
Dhanda has served on the boards of several housing charities and social housing providers, including Hanover Housing Association, Swan Housing and Longhurst Group.

He joined the board of Longhurst Group in September 2016 and later held further governance roles within the group. Following the merger of Longhurst Group and Grand Union Housing Group in December 2024, he served on the board of the resulting organisation, Amplius, for the remainder of his term.

=== Back Heathrow ===
In 2017, Dhanda became Executive Director of Back Heathrow, a campaign supporting the expansion of Heathrow Airport.

He appeared before the House of Commons Transport Committee as Executive Director of Back Heathrow during its inquiry into the Airports National Policy Statement.

Dhanda has advocated Heathrow expansion on economic, employment and infrastructure grounds while also arguing for environmental safeguards relating to carbon emissions, air quality and aircraft noise.

In 2026, Dhanda spoke at the LEAP technology conference in Riyadh, Saudi Arabia, where he took part in sessions on the future of travel infrastructure and air mobility.

== Writing ==
In 2015, Dhanda published the political memoir My Political Race: An Outsider's Journey to the Heart of British Politics, with a foreword by former Home Secretary Alan Johnson. The book discusses his upbringing, parliamentary career and experiences as an ethnic minority politician.

== Charity work ==
Dhanda is a patron of Harry's Pals, a charity supporting parents of seriously ill or disabled children through counselling, emotional support and respite services.

He has also served as a trustee of the Parliamentary Outreach Trust and has held charitable and governance roles associated with healthcare, social housing and regeneration.

== Personal life ==
Dhanda is married to Rupi Dhanda, a family lawyer, and they have two sons.

Parliament of the United Kingdom
Preceded by Tess Kingham	Member of Parliament for Gloucester; 2001–2010	Succeeded by Richard Graham
