= Law of the Wild =

Law of the Wild may refer to:

- The Law of the Wilds, a 1915 American silent short drama film directed by Thomas Ricketts
- The Law of the Wild, a 1934 American Mascot movie serial directed by B. Reeves Eason and Armand Schaefer
- Law of the Wolf also known as Law of the Wild, a 1939 American film directed by Bernard B. Ray
- Law of the Wild, a painting by English-American painter Charles S. Raleigh
