= Charles Wilton =

Charles Wilton may refer to:

- Charles Henry Wilton (1761–1832), English violinist, singer, composer and teacher
- Charles Richard Wilton (1855–1927), South Australia journalist and literary editor
