= White City, Gloucester =

Coordinates: 51.845°N 2.236°W

White City is an estate in the City of Gloucester. It takes its name from the original white concrete houses.

Following World War I, there was a national movement to improve working-class housing, and rehouse families living in city centre slums. Land nearby had already been used for model housing in 1914, forming Northfield Road and Northfield Square. In 1927, Gloucester Corporation compulsorily purchased Starveall Farm to build the new homes that became White City.

The estate was formally opened by the Duke of Gloucester, in a tree-planting ceremony held on 14 July 1928. In the 1990s, the estate was substantially rebuilt. Many of the old homes were demolished by Gloucester City Council, and new homes built by Oxbode Housing Association and Beazer.

Roads in the estate include Avening Road, Barkis Bungalows, Barnfields, Beaufort Road, Bibury Road, Broadway, Darwin Road, Dickens Close, Finlay Place, Finlay Road, Hazelton Close, Nickelby Bungalows, Northfield Road, Northfield Square, Reservoir Road, Sapperton Road, Selwyn Road and Stow Close. The street names reference Gloucestershire villages as well as characters from the novels of Charles Dickens who had visited Gloucester docks in the 1850s.

Despite its long standing, White City did not appear on any official maps of Gloucester. Residents of White City successfully campaigned for their neighbourhood to be recognised officially as a district of the City, and to appear on maps and road signs. In October 2012, the present Duke of Gloucester was invited back to mark White City’s new standing.
