= Gloucester =

- City and non-metropolitan district
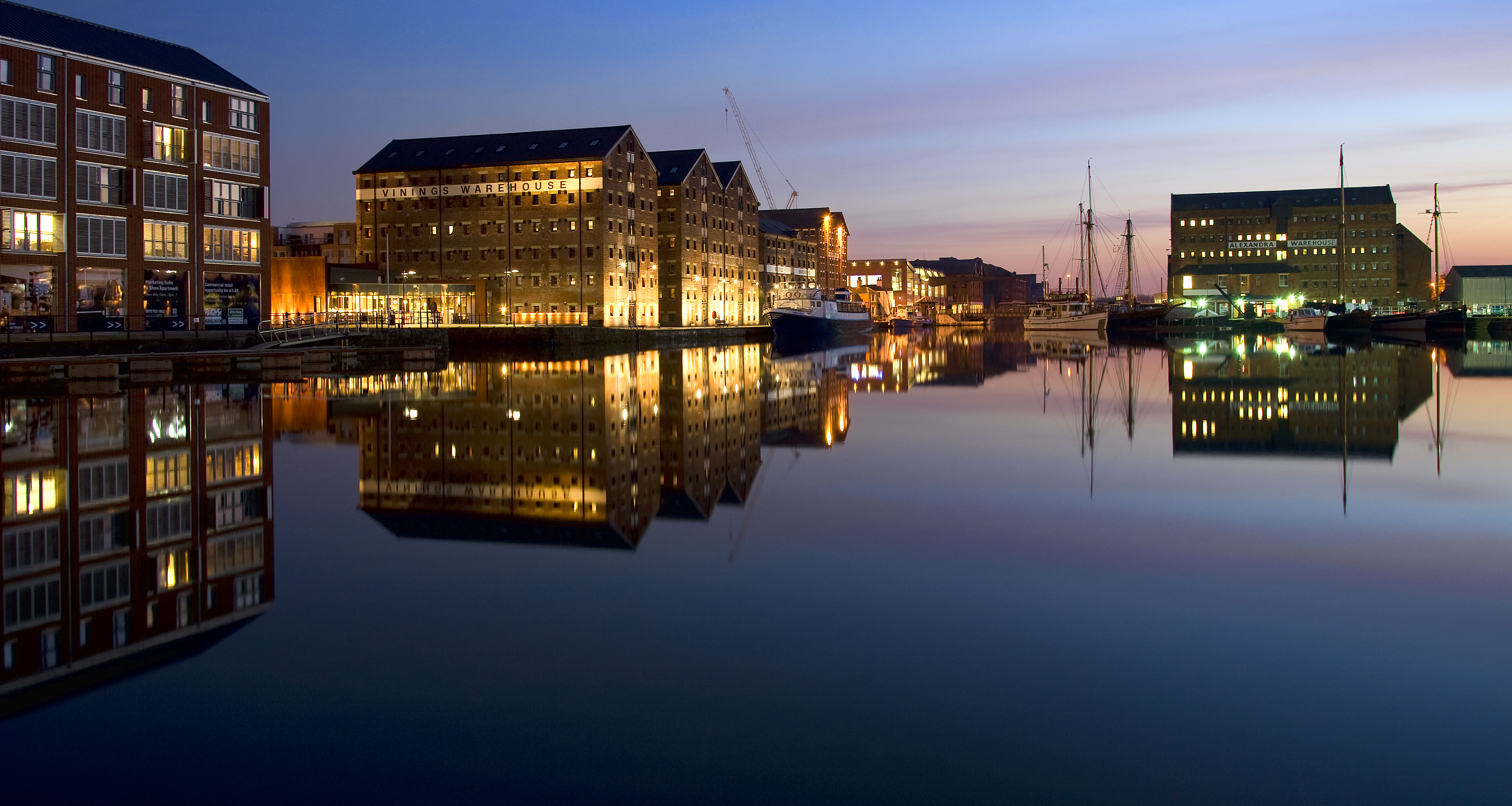
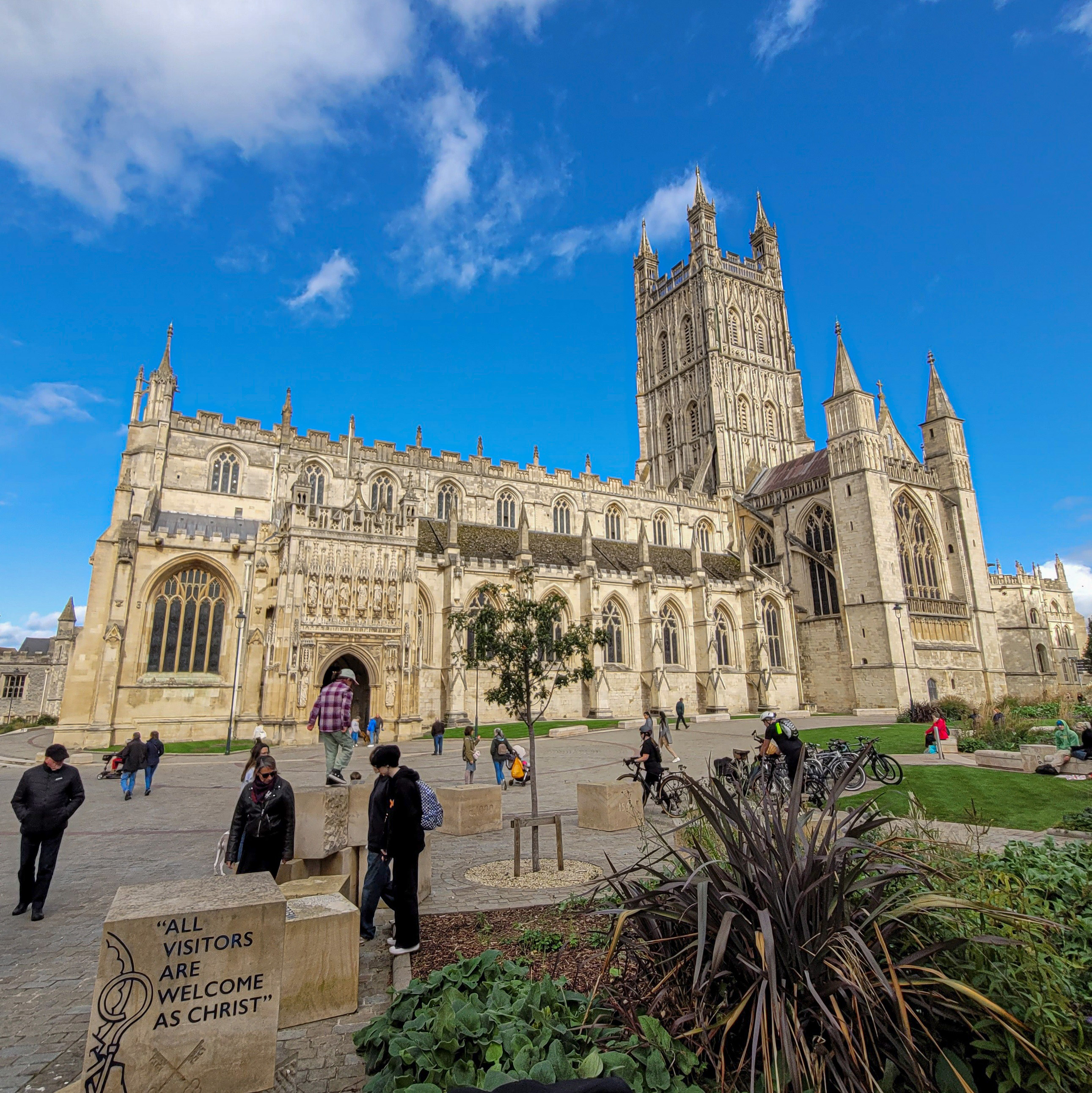
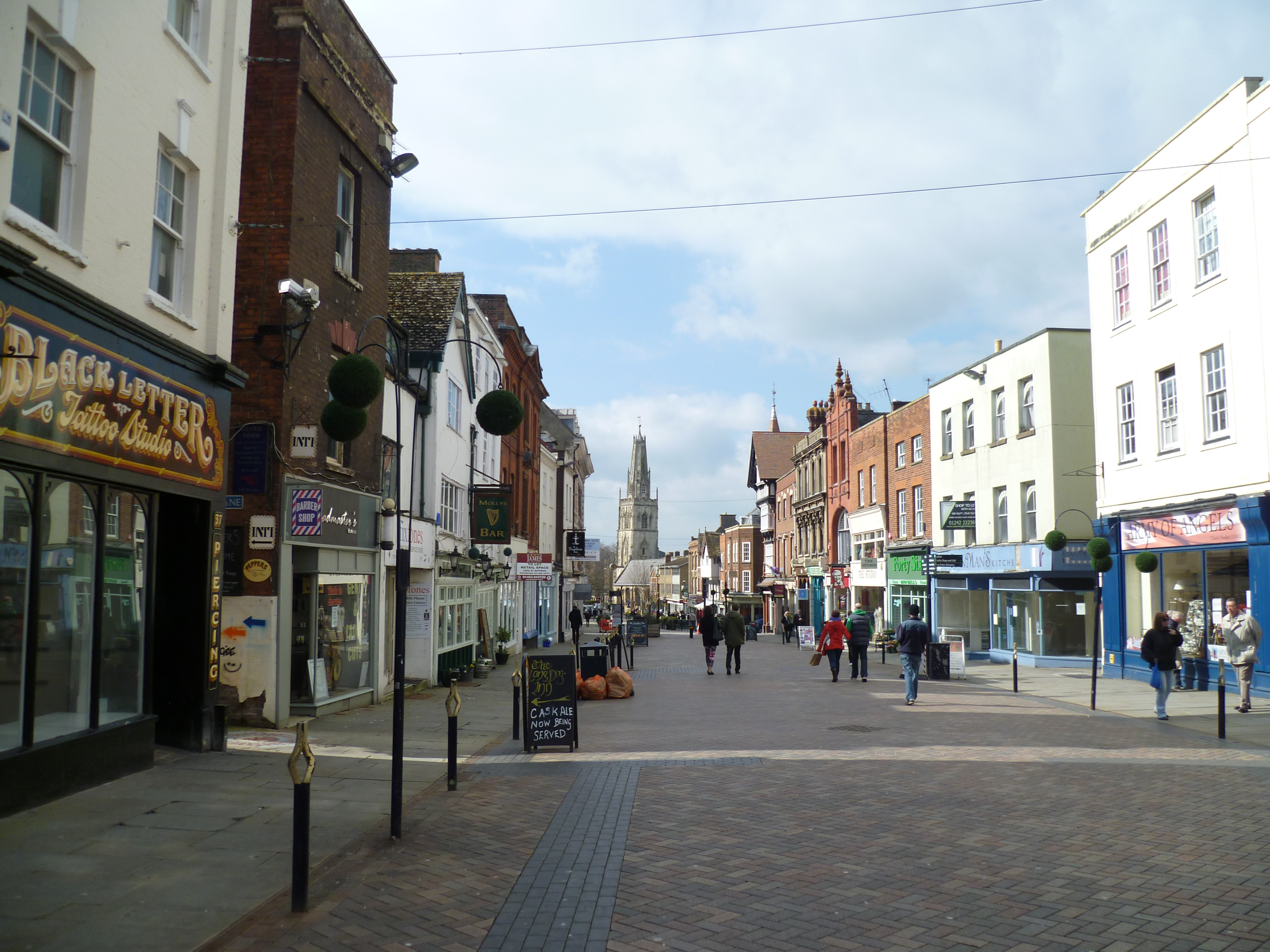
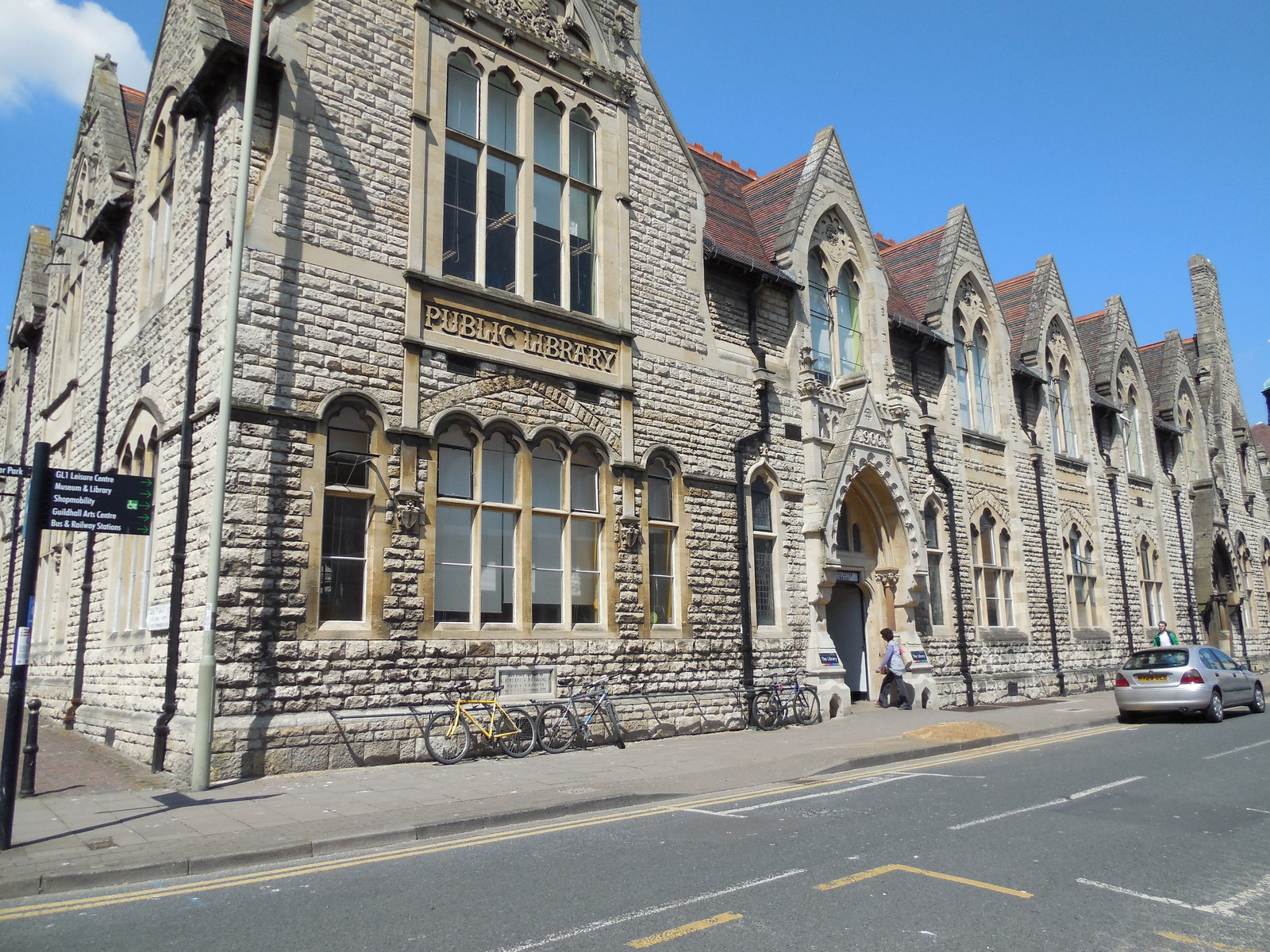
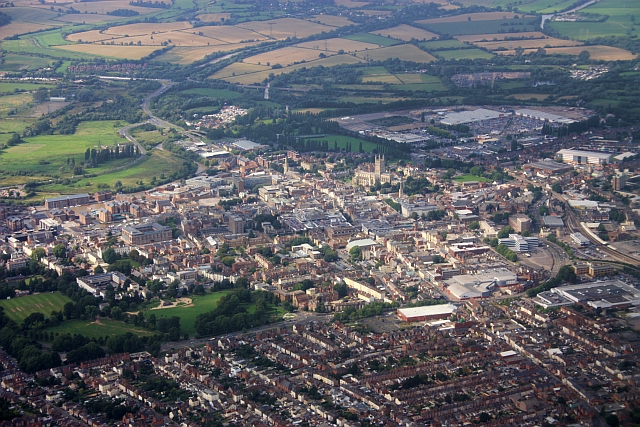
- Gloucester Docks Gloucester Cathedral Westgate, Gloucester Gloucester Public Library Aerial view

- Coat of arms

- City of Gloucester shown within Gloucestershire
- Interactive map of Gloucester
- Coordinates: 51°51′55″N 2°14′45″W
- Sovereign state: United Kingdom
- Country: England
- Region: South West England
- Non-metropolitan county: Gloucestershire
- Status: Non-metropolitan district, city
- Admin HQ: Gloucester
- Roman Gloucester (Glevum): 48
- Incorporated as a city: 1155
- Incorporated as a county within: 1483

Government
  - Type: Non-metropolitan district council
  - Body: Gloucester City Council
  - Leadership: Leader and cabinet (No overall control)
  - MP: Alex McIntyre (Labour)

Area
  - Total: 15.65 sq mi (40.54 km^{2})
  - Rank: 259th (of 296)

Population (2021 Census)
  - Total: 132,416
  - Rank: 176th (of 296)
  - Density: 8,460/sq mi (3,266/km^{2})

Ethnicity (2021)
  - Ethnic groups: List: 84.9% White; 6.5% Asian; 3.8% Mixed; 3.6% Black; 1.2% other

Religion (2021)
  - Religion: List: 47.7% Christianity; 39.7% no religion; 7.9% other; 4.7% Islam
- Time zone: UTC0 (GMT)
  - Summer (DST): UTC+1 (BST)
- Postcodes: GL1-GL4
- Area code: 01452
- ONS code: 23UE (ONS); E07000081 (GSS)
- OS grid reference: SO832186
- Website: gloucester.gov.uk

Gloucester (/ˈɡlɒstər/ GLOSS-tər) is a cathedral city, non-metropolitan district and the county town of Gloucestershire in the South West of England. Gloucester lies on the River Severn, between the Cotswolds to the east and the Forest of Dean to the west. It is situated 7 miles (11 km) from Cheltenham, 19 miles (31 km) from Monmouth, 33 miles (53 km) from Bristol, and 17 miles (27 km) east of the England and Wales border. Gloucester has a population of around 132,000, including suburban areas. It is a port, linked via the Gloucester and Sharpness Canal to the Severn Estuary.

Gloucester was founded as a Roman colony in AD 97, under Emperor Nerva as Colonia Glevum Nervensis.

It was granted its first charter in 1155 by Henry II. In 1216, Henry III, aged only nine years, was crowned with a gilded iron ring in the Chapter House of Gloucester Cathedral. Gloucester's significance in the Middle Ages is underlined by the fact that it had a number of monastic establishments, including St Peter's Abbey, founded in 679 (later Gloucester Cathedral); the nearby St Oswald's Priory, founded in the 880s or 890s; and Llanthony Secunda Priory, founded in 1136. The town is also the site of the siege of Gloucester in 1643, during which the city held out against Royalist forces in the First English Civil War.

A major attraction of the city is Gloucester Cathedral, which is the burial place of King Edward II and Walter de Lacy; it features in scenes from the Harry Potter films. Other features of interest include the museum and school of art and science, the former county gaol (on the site of a Saxon and Norman castle), the Gloucester Shire Hall (now headquarters of the Gloucestershire County Council) and the Whitefield memorial church. A park in the south of the city contains a spa, a chalybeate spring having been discovered in 1814.

Economically, the city is dominated by the service industries and has strong financial, research, distribution and light industrial sectors. Historically, it was prominent in the aerospace industry.

In 1926, the Gloucestershire Aircraft Company at Brockworth changed its name to the Gloster Aircraft Company because international customers claimed that the name Gloucestershire was too difficult to spell. A sculpture in the city centre celebrates Gloucester's aviation history and its involvement in the development of the jet engine.

== Toponymy ==
The Roman name of the city was Glevum, coming from a Brythonic word meaning 'bright'. The post-Roman Brythonic name of the city became Caerloyw (IPA: [kaɨrˈlɔɨʊ, kairˈlɔiʊ]) or Caer Glow (IPA: [kaɨrˈglɔʊ, kairˈglɔʊ]), a compound of caer meaning 'fort' (in reference to the Roman fortification) and loyw, a lenition of gloyw. Caerloyw is attested from the 8th century, and continues in modern Welsh as the name of the city.

When the Anglo-Saxons took control of the city, the name was changed to Gleawecastre (also recorded as Gleucestre), using the toponymic suffix -cester, a borrowing from Latin castra.

This etymology was first suggested by the Austrian philologist, Alfred Holder, in 1896. An alternative etymology has been proposed, which argues that the first element of the place-name is related to a Welsh word signifying 'valiant', rendering 'Gloucester' to mean 'fortress of the valiant'.

== History ==
=== Roman Gloucester ===
Glevum was established around AD 48 at an important crossing of the River Severn and near to the Fosse Way, the early front line after the Roman invasion of Britain. Initially, a Roman fort was established at present-day Kingsholm. Twenty years later, a larger legionary fortress was built on slightly higher ground nearby, centred on present-day Gloucester Cross, and a civilian settlement grew around it. Probably the Roman Legion XX Valeria Victrix was based here until 66 and then Legio II Augusta as they prepared to invade Roman Wales between 66 and 74 AD, who stayed later until around 87.

Gloucester became a Colonia in 97 as Colonia Nervia Glevensium, or Glevum, in the reign of Nerva. It is likely that Glevum became the provincial capital of Britannia Prima.

Within about 15 years new privately constructed properties replaced the earlier barracks and public buildings, temples and bath houses were under construction in stone. Piped water began to be supplied. Drains and sewers were laid. On the site of the legionary principia an imposing central forum was laid out surrounded by colonnades and flanked on three sides by part-timbered ranges of shops. Closing off the south of the forum was the 100m x 40m Basilica. Many fine homes with mosaic floors were built in the town.

At its height, Glevum may have had a population of as many as 10,000 people. The entire area around Glevum was intensely Romanised in the second and third centuries with a higher than normal distribution of villas.

At the end of the third century or the start of the fourth, major changes were made to the city's second-century wall. It was replaced in two stages by a stronger and higher one of stone resting on massive reused stone blocks. In the second stage, the blocks rested on deep timber foundation piles. Stone external towers were added; two parallel wide ditches were also cut in front of the new walls.

Remains of the Roman city can still be seen:

- Many archaeological artifacts and some in-situ walls in the Gloucester City Museum & Art Gallery
- The remains of the Roman and mediaeval East Gate in the East Gate Chamber on Eastgate Street
- Northgate, Southgate, Eastgate and Westgate Streets all follow the line of their original Roman counterparts, although Westgate Street has moved slightly north and Southgate Street now extends through the site of the Roman basilica.

=== Post-Roman Gloucester ===
Withdrawal of all Roman forces and many societal leaders in about the year 410 may have allowed leading families of the Dobunni tribe to regain power within the now Roman-influenced, interconnected and intermixed Celtic Brythonic local people. This intermix is reflected by the fact a large minority of basic words and available synonyms in Welsh have a Latin base. In the Anglo-Saxon Chronicle Gloucester is shown as part of Wessex from the Battle of Deorham in 577. At some point afterwards, along with the rest of its shire excluding the Forest of Dean, Gloucester was part of the minor kingdom of the Hwicce. In 628, as a result of the Battle of Cirencester, that kingdom became a client or sub-kingdom of Mercia. From about 780, the Hwicce was no longer feigning any pretence as a kingdom and became part of Mercia. Mercia, allied by matrimony and sharing a desire to counter the Danish onslaught as had conquered swathes of the wider island at large, submitted to Alfred the Great's Kingdom of Wessex in about 877–883. A 20th-century writer intuitively adds that Roman stem Gleu- Glev- was, doubtless, pronounced without any final consonant. Claudia Castra is mentioned in the 18th century as a possible Latin name related to the city.

The first bridging point on a navigable, defensive barrier, great river and the foundation in 681 of the abbey of St Peter by Æthelred of Mercia, favoured town growth; and before the Norman conquest of England, Gloucester was a borough governed by a portreeve, with a castle which was frequently a royal residence, and a mint. In the early 10th century, the remains of Saint Oswald were brought to a small church here and shrine built there, a draw for pilgrims. The core street layout is thought to date to the reign of Æthelflæd in late Saxon times.

In 1051, Edward the Confessor held court at Gloucester and was threatened there by an army led by Godwin, Earl of Wessex, but the incident resulted in a standoff rather than a battle.

=== Middle Ages ===
After the Norman Conquest, William Rufus made Robert Fitzhamon the first baron or overlord of Gloucester. Fitzhamon had a military base at Cardiff Castle, and for the succeeding years the history of Gloucester was closely linked to that of Cardiff.

During the Anarchy, Gloucester was a centre of support for the Empress Matilda, who was supported in her claim to the throne by her half-brother, Fitzhamon's grandson, Robert, 1st Earl of Gloucester (also known as Robert of Gloucester). After this period of strife ended with the ascent of her son Henry to the throne Henry II of England, Henry granted Robert possession of Cardiff Castle, and it later passed to William Fitz Robert, 2nd Earl of Gloucester son of Robert. The story of the Anarchy is vividly told in a series of 19th-century paintings by William Burges at the Castle.

Henry granted Gloucester its first charter in 1155, which gave the burgesses the same liberties as the citizens of London and Winchester. A second charter of Henry II gave them freedom of passage on the River Severn. The first charter was confirmed in 1194 by King Richard I. The privileges of the borough were greatly extended by the charter of King John (1200), which gave freedom from toll throughout the kingdom and from pleading outside the borough.

In 1216, King Henry III, aged only 9 years, was crowned with a gilded iron ring in the Chapter House of Gloucester Cathedral. During his reign, Eleanor, Fair Maid of Brittany his cousin was briefly imprisoned at Gloucester Castle as state prisoner from 1222 to 1223, and from 1237 to 1238, in addition to sometime during the reign of King John.

Gloucester's significance in the Middle Ages is underlined by the fact that it had a number of monastic establishments, including St Peter's Abbey founded in 679 (later Gloucester Cathedral), the nearby St Oswald's Priory, Gloucester founded in the 880s or 890s, Llanthony Secunda Priory, founded 1136 as a retreat for a community of Welsh monks (now near the western bypass), the Franciscan Greyfriars community founded in 1231 (near Eastgate Shopping Centre), and the Dominican Blackfriars community founded in 1239 (Ladybellegate Street). It also has some very early churches including St Mary de Lode Church, Gloucester near the Cathedral and the Norman St Mary de Crypt Church, Gloucester in Southgate Street.

Additionally, there is evidence of a Jewish community in Gloucester as early as 1158–1159; they lived around present-day East Gate Street and had a synagogue on the south side, near St Michael's church. Gloucester was probably the home of Rabbi Moses, who established an important Anglo-Jewish family. The Jews of the town were falsely accused by the Dominican monks of murdering a child, Harold of Gloucester, in an attempt to establish a cult similar to that of William of Norwich, which failed entirely. Nevertheless, the accusations were recycled around the time of the Edict of Expulsion. In January 1275, Eleanor of Provence expelled Jews from all of the towns within her dower lands, and the Jews of Gloucester were ordered to move to Bristol but finding an especially difficult situation there, relocated to Hereford.

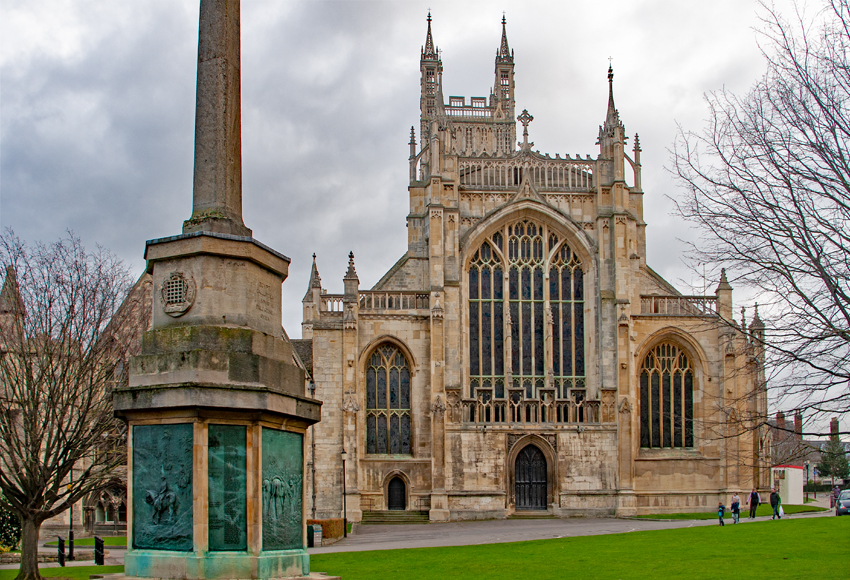
Gloucester Cathedral housed the Parliament between 1378 and 1406.

In the Middle Ages, the main export was wool, which came from the Cotswolds and was processed in Gloucester; other exports included leather and iron (tools and weapons). Gloucester also had a large fishing industry at that time.

In 1222, a massive fire destroyed part of Gloucester.

One of the most significant periods in Gloucester's history began in 1378 when Richard II convened Parliament in the city. Parliaments were held there until 1406 under Henry IV of England. The Parliament Rooms at the Cathedral remain as testimony to this important time.

Gloucester was incorporated by King Richard III in 1483, the town being made a county in itself.

=== Early modern era to contemporary period ===
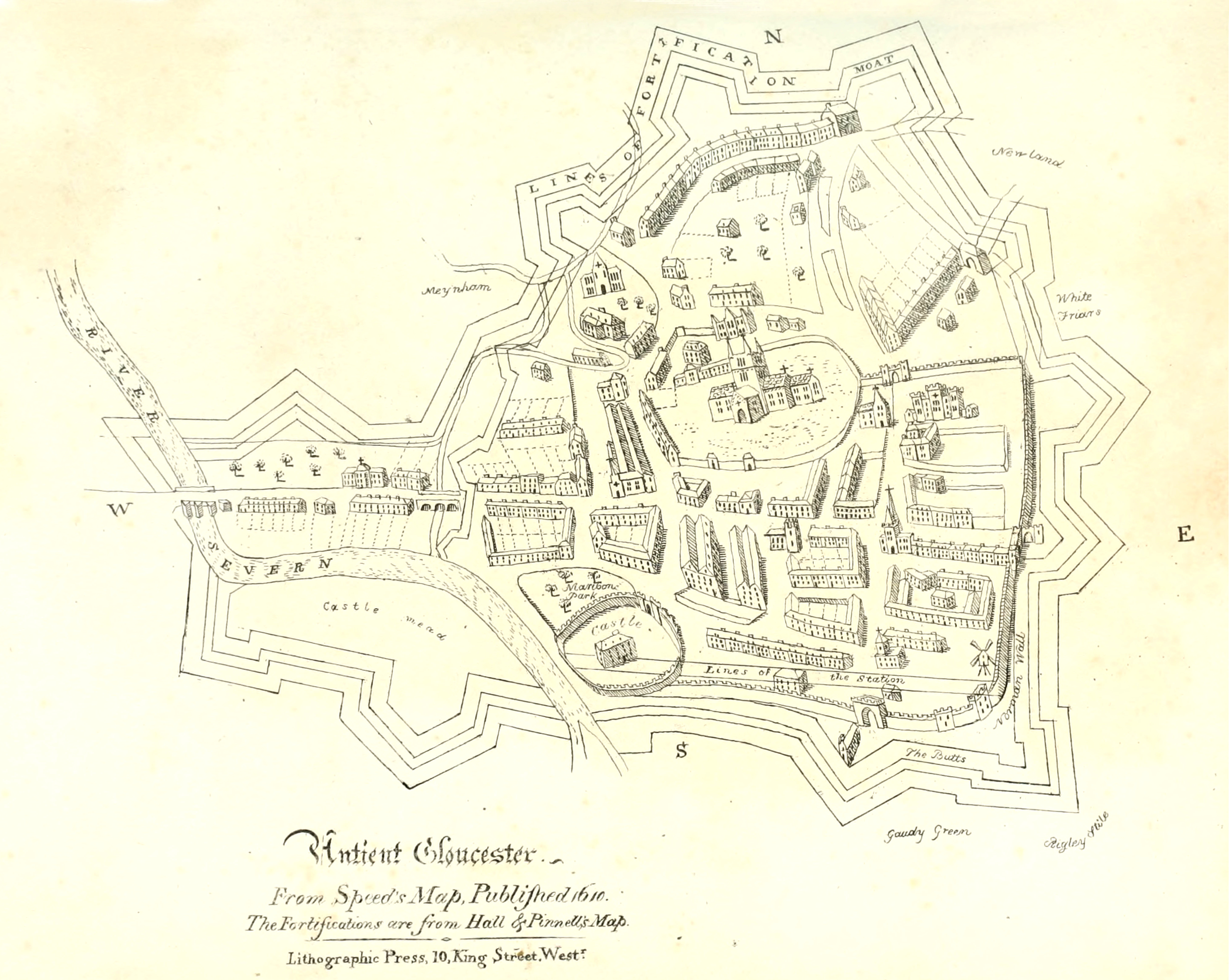
Ancient Gloucester from Speed's map of 1610 with fortifications from Hall & Pinnell, ex Fosbroke's history (contains inaccuracies)

The city's charter was confirmed in 1489 and 1510, and other charters of incorporation were received by Gloucester from Queen Elizabeth I and King James I. Princess Mary visited Gloucester in September 1525 accompanied by her ladies and gentlewomen. She was met by the Mayor, John Rawlins, at Quedgeley. Her father Henry VIII and his then Queen, Anne Boleyn, visited in July 1535. They used Gloucester as a base for hunting trips to Painswick, Coberley, and Miserden. They left Gloucester for Leonard Stanley, on their way to Berkeley Castle.

Gloucester was the site of the execution by burning of John Hooper, Bishop of Gloucester, in the time of Queen Mary in 1555. In 1580, Gloucester was awarded the status of a port by Queen Elizabeth I.

The 16th and 17th centuries saw the foundation of two of Gloucester's grammar schools: the Crypt School in 1539 and Sir Thomas Rich's School in 1666. Both still flourish as grammar schools today, along with Ribston Hall and Denmark Road High School.

During the English Civil War, the fall of nearby Bristol encouraged the reinforcement of the existing town defences. The siege of Gloucester commenced in 1643 in which the besieged parliamentarians emerged victorious. The Royalist's plan of bombardment and tunnelling to the east gate failed due to the inadequacy of the Royalist artillery and the besieged sniping and conducting artillery fire on the Royalist encampment.

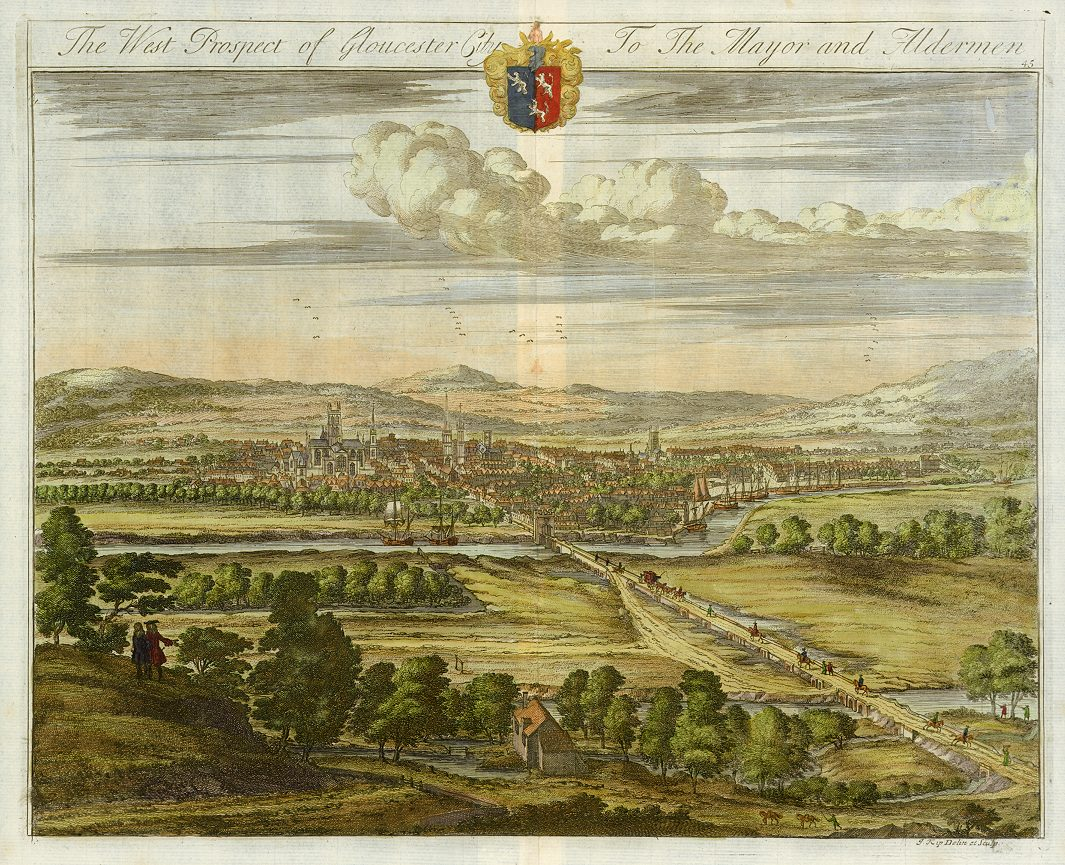
Jan Kip's West prospect of Gloucester, c. 1725, emphasises the causeway and bridges traversing the water meadows of the floodplain.

By the mid-17th century, only the gatehouse and keep of Gloucester Castle remained, the latter of which was being used as a gaol until it was deemed unsuitable and demolished in the late 1780s. By 1791, the new gaol was completed leaving no trace of the former castle.

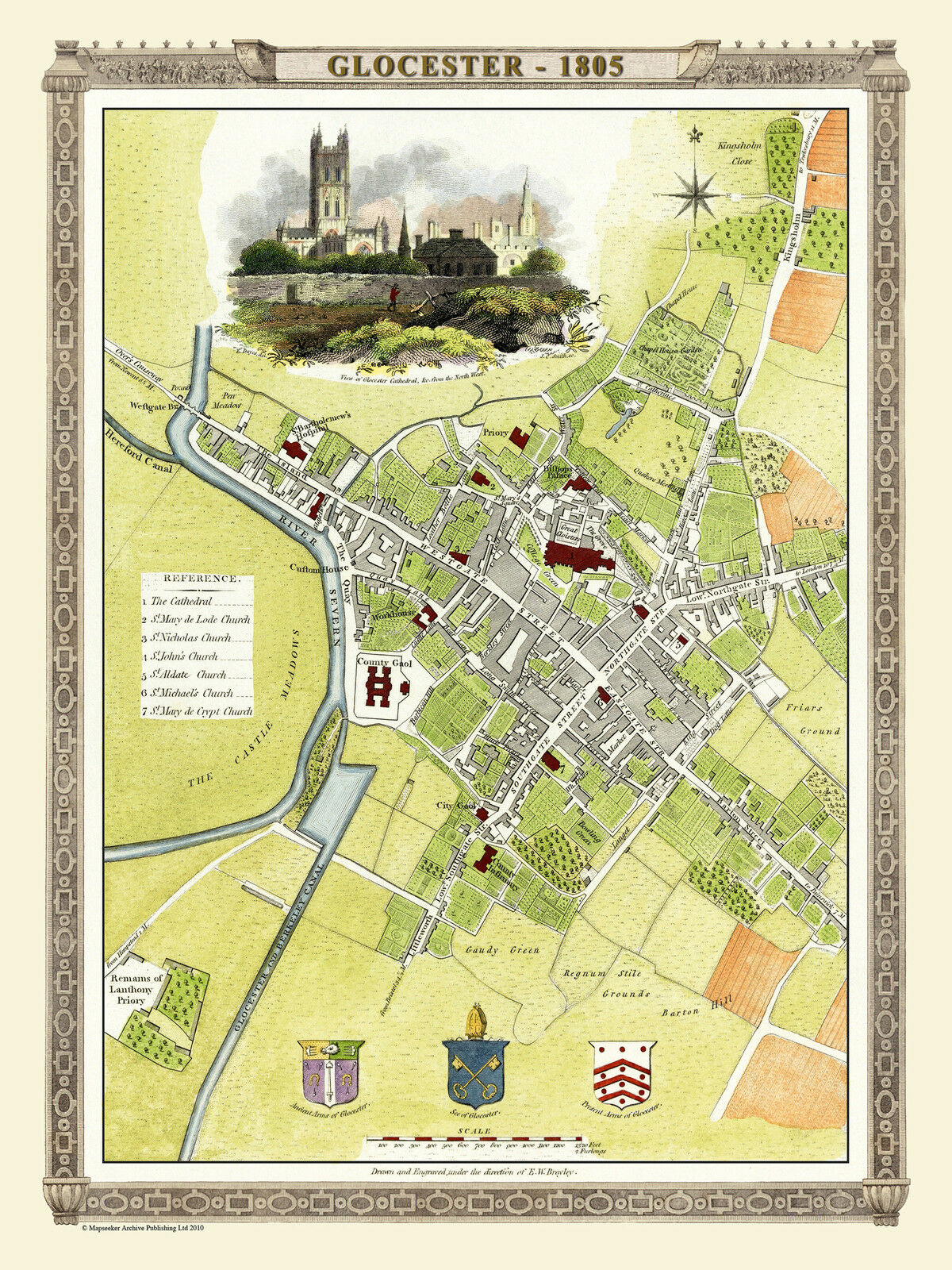
Map of Gloucester in 1805

In the 19th century, the city grew with new buildings including Wellington Parade and the Grade II listed Picton House (c. 1825).

The 1896 Gloucester smallpox epidemic affected some 2000 residents.

During the Second World War, two petroleum storage depots were constructed in Gloucester. A Government Civil Storage depot with six 4,000-ton semi-buried tanks was constructed on the Berkeley Canal in 1941/42 by Shell-Mex and BP and connected to the pipeline that ran from the Mersey to the Avon. It was also connected to the Air Force Reserve Depot and a Shell Mex and BP facility for road and rail loading. Due to severe tank corrosion, it was demolished in 1971/2 and disposed of in 1976. The second depot was an Air Force Reserve Depot with four 4,000-ton semi-buried tanks constructed in 1941/42 by Shell, Shell-Mex and BP at the Monk Meadow Dock on the Canal. Originally, delivery was by road, rail and barge and pipeline. It was also connected to the docks and to the Shell Mex and BP installation for rail and road loading facilities and the civil storage site. It was transferred from the Air Ministry to the Ministry of Power in 1959, closed in the 1990s and disposed of in the later 2000s.

Gloucester's most important citizens include Robert Raikes (founder of the Sunday School movement) who is still commemorated by the name of Robert Raikes' House in Southgate Street. Its most infamous citizen was Fred West.

In July 2007, Gloucester was hit badly by a flood that struck Gloucestershire and its surrounding areas. Hundreds of homes were flooded, but the event was most memorable because of its wider impact – about 40,000 people were without power for 24 hours, and the entire city (plus surrounding areas) was without piped water for 17 days.

In 2009, Gloucester Day was revived as an annual day of celebration of Gloucester's history and culture. The day originally dates from the lifting of the Siege of Gloucester in 1643, during which the city held out against Royalist forces during the First English Civil War.

=== Coat of arms ===
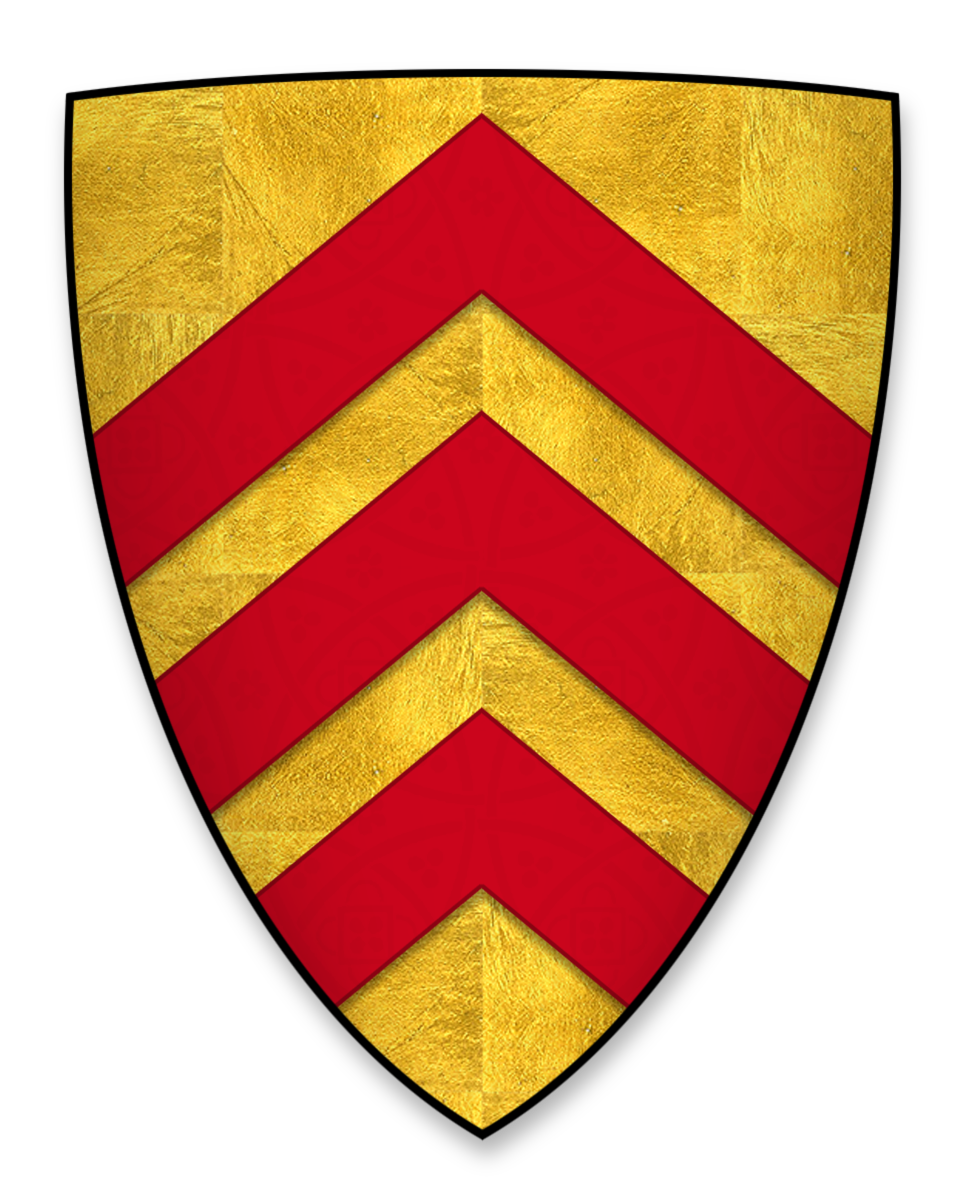
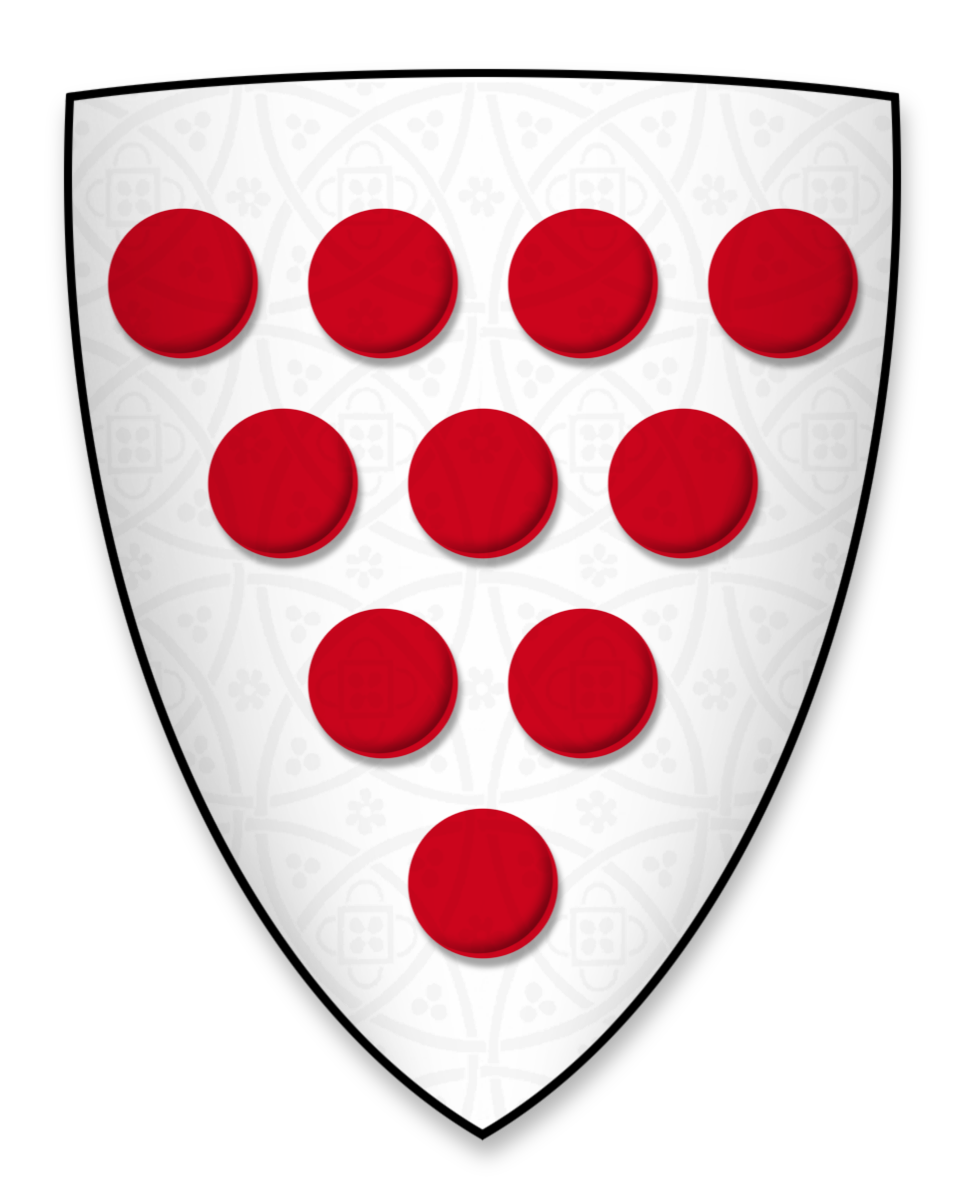
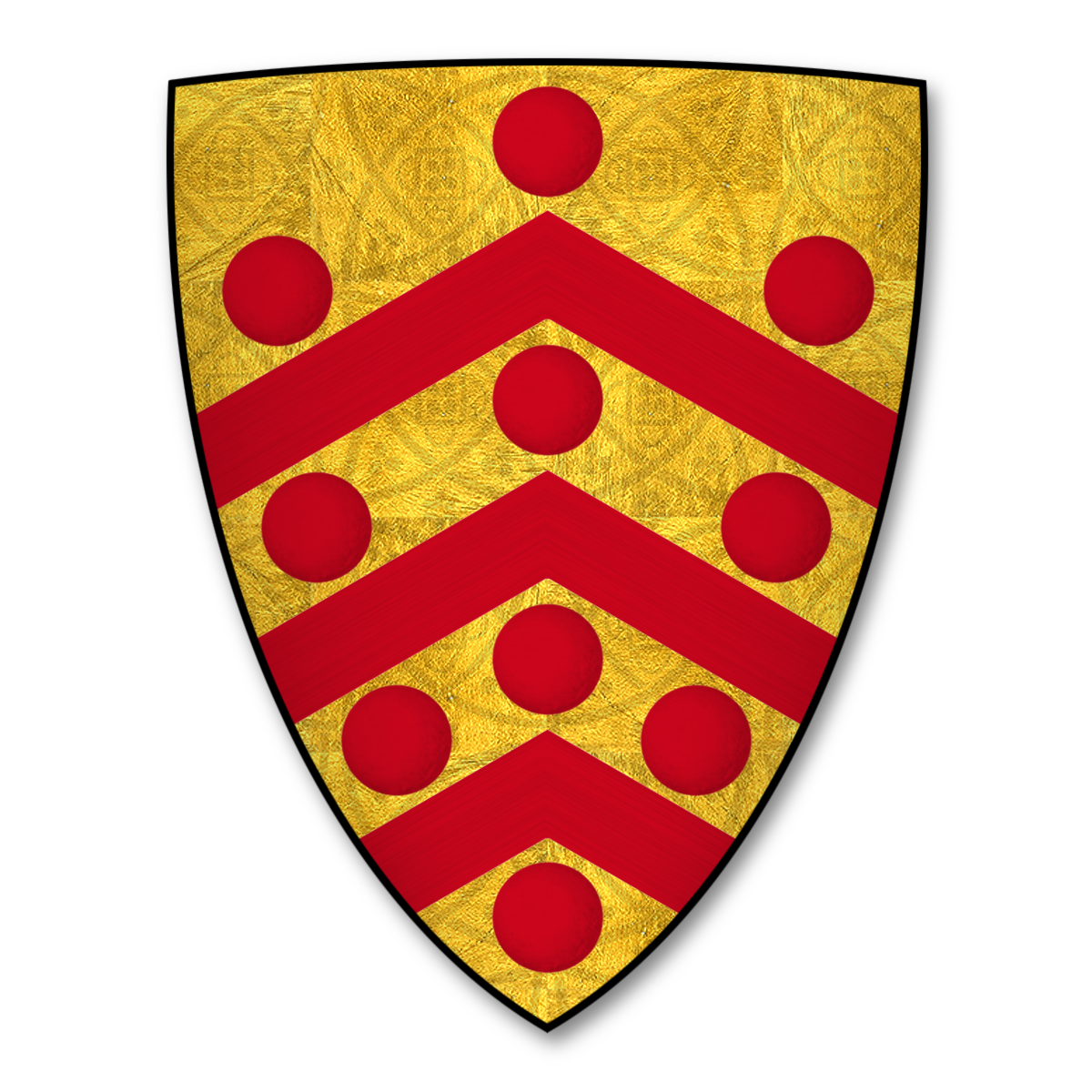
Left: the arms of the Clare family; centre: the arms of the Bishop of Worcester; right: the arms of the city of Gloucester

Gloucester is one of the few cities in England with two coats of arms. The first consists of three chevrons surrounded by ten roundels. The chevrons come from the arms of the Clare family, who were earls of Gloucester from the 12th to the 14th centuries, while the roundels come from the arms of the Bishop of Worcester, whose bishopric historically encompassed Gloucester. This coat is the older of the two, though it is usually termed the "Commonwealth coat", as it was not officially granted to the city until 1652, during the Commonwealth period. The crest and supporters (lions bearing broadswords and trowels) were also adopted at this time, along with the motto Fides Invicta Triumphat ("unconquered faith triumphs", in reference to the royalist siege withstood by the city in 1643).

A recreation of the most common depictions of the 'Tudor Arms' of Gloucester

The second coat, termed the "Tudor coat", was granted in 1538. It features the roses of York and Lancaster, the boar's head of Richard III, a ceremonial sword and cap, and two horseshoes surrounded by nails, to represent Gloucester's historical association with ironworking.

Although grants made by Commonwealth heralds were nullified after the Restoration, the Commonwealth coat continued to be used by the city rather than the Tudor coat. The Commonwealth coat, along with the crest and supporters, was legally granted to the city by letters patent dated 16 April 1945. This was reconfirmed in 1974 following the local government changes of that year.

== Governance ==
There are two tiers of local government covering Gloucester, at district (city) and county level: Gloucester City Council and Gloucestershire County Council. The Quedgeley area of the city is a civil parish with a town council, forming a third tier of local government; the remainder of the city is an unparished area.

=== History ===
Gloucester was an ancient borough, being treated as a borough from Saxon times and being granted its first known borough charter by Henry II in 1155. In 1483 the town of Gloucester was given the right to appoint its own magistrates, making it a county corporate, administratively independent from the surrounding county of Gloucestershire. When the Diocese of Gloucester was founded in 1541, the town was given the right to call itself a city. The city was reformed to become a municipal borough in 1836 under the Municipal Corporations Act 1835. When elected county councils were established in 1889, Gloucester was considered large enough to provide its own county-level services, and so it was made a county borough, independent from Gloucestershire County Council.

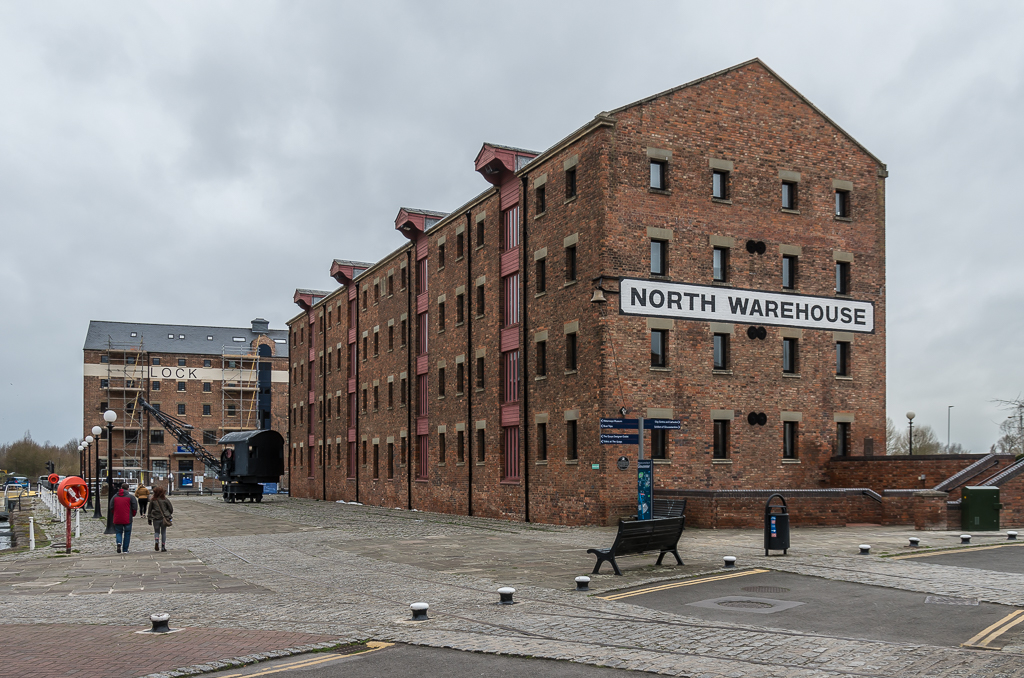
North Warehouse

Gloucester Guildhall at 23 Eastgate Street was built in 1892 and served as the city's administrative headquarters until 1986, when the council moved to North Warehouse at Gloucester Docks.

On 1 April 1974, the modern district of Gloucester was formed under the Local Government Act 1972, covering the same area as the abolished County Borough of Gloucester. The reforms also saw the city become subordinate to Gloucestershire County Council, losing the independence it had held since 1483. The parish of Quedgeley was subsequently transferred into Gloucester from Stroud District in 1991. Quedgeley retains its own parish council, unlike the rest of Gloucester, which is an unparished area. In 2017, Quedgeley Parish Council changed its name to Quedgeley Town Council, making it a town within a city.

== Geography ==
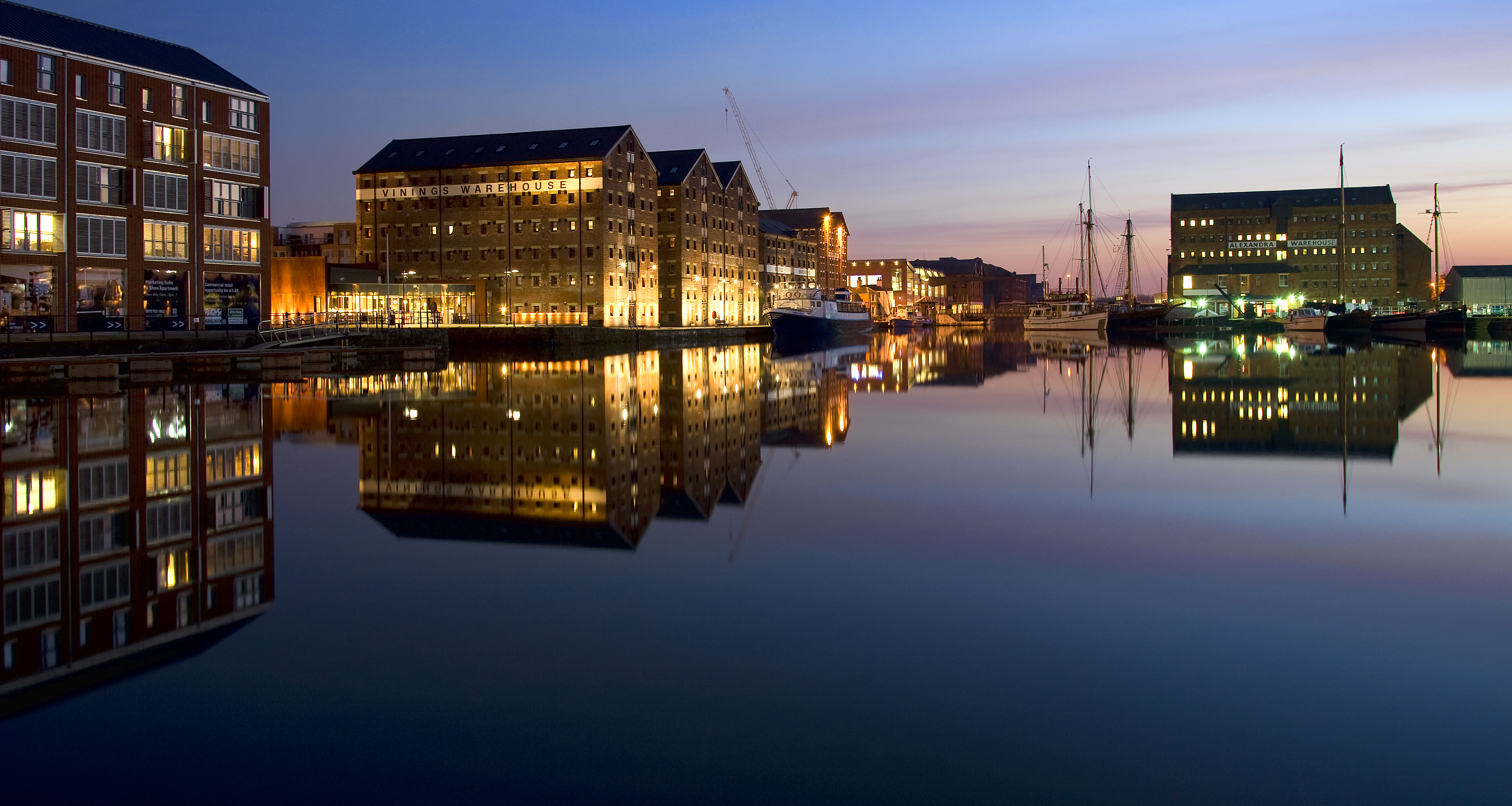
Gloucester Docks at night

Gloucester is the county town of Gloucestershire, and is the 53rd largest settlement in the United Kingdom by population. In 2010, its population was 123,400. It has the traditional lowest bridging point of the longest river in Great Britain, connecting it with Over. The 2011 census recorded that the city had a population of 121,921 and by 2016 its population was estimated to be 128,488. The city's urban area extends beyond its boundaries, with several outlying districts. The 2021 census gave the population of the Gloucester Urban Area as 169,061, absorbing areas such as Brockworth and Churchdown.

The city is located on the eastern bank of the River Severn, sheltered by the Cotswolds to the east, while the Forest of Dean and the Malvern Hills rise to the west and north, respectively. Gloucester is an inland port, linked via the Gloucester and Sharpness Canal which runs from Gloucester's docks to the Severn Estuary, allowing larger ships to reach the docks than would be possible on the tidal reaches of the river itself, which go well north of the city to Haw Bridge. The wharfs, warehouses and the docks themselves fell into disrepair until their renovation in the 1980s. They now form a public open space. Some warehouses now house the Gloucester Waterways Museum, others were converted into residential flats, shops and bars. Additionally, the Soldiers of Gloucestershire Museum is located in the Custom House.

Gloucester is made up of a variety of neighbourhoods, some of which correspond to electoral divisions of the City Council.

- Abbeydale
- Abbeymead
- Alney Island
- Barnwood
- Barton and Tredworth
- Coney Hill
- Coopers Edge
- Elmbridge
- Hempsted
- Hucclecote
- Kingsholm
- Linden
- Longford
- Longlevens
- Matson
- Podsmead
- Quedgeley †
- St. Pauls
- Tuffley
- Westgate
- White City
- Wotton

† Quedgeley is the only town within the city's borders. Because of this it has its own town council.

=== Green belt ===
The city itself contains no green belt; however, it is bordered to the north east by the green belt in the surrounding Tewkesbury district, helping to maintain local green space, prevent further urban sprawl and unplanned expansion towards Cheltenham and Innsworth, as well as protecting smaller nearby villages such as Churchdown, Badgeworth, Shurdington, and Twigworth.

== Climate ==
Climate data for Gloucester/Cheltenham, (Note: Weather station is located 7.0 miles (11.3 km) from the Gloucester city centre.) (1991–2020 normals, extremes 1889–2001)
Month	Jan	Feb	Mar	Apr	May	Jun	Jul	Aug	Sep	Oct	Nov	Dec	Year
Record high °C (°F)	15.0 (59.0)	18.0 (64.4)	22.2 (72.0)	26.7 (80.1)	29.4 (84.9)	34.6 (94.3)	35.9 (96.6)	37.1 (98.8)	32.6 (90.7)	26.7 (80.1)	17.5 (63.5)	16.2 (61.2)	37.1 (98.8)
Mean daily maximum °C (°F)	8.0 (46.4)	8.6 (47.5)	11.3 (52.3)	14.6 (58.3)	18.1 (64.6)	20.8 (69.4)	23.2 (73.8)	22.2 (72.0)	19.5 (67.1)	15.1 (59.2)	11.0 (51.8)	8.5 (47.3)	15.1 (59.2)
Daily mean °C (°F)	5.2 (41.4)	5.5 (41.9)	7.5 (45.5)	9.9 (49.8)	13.2 (55.8)	15.9 (60.6)	18.3 (64.9)	17.7 (63.9)	15.0 (59.0)	11.5 (52.7)	8.0 (46.4)	5.5 (41.9)	11.1 (52.0)
Mean daily minimum °C (°F)	2.3 (36.1)	2.3 (36.1)	3.6 (38.5)	5.1 (41.2)	8.2 (46.8)	11.0 (51.8)	13.4 (56.1)	13.2 (55.8)	10.5 (50.9)	7.9 (46.2)	4.9 (40.8)	2.4 (36.3)	7.1 (44.8)
Record low °C (°F)	−20.1 (−4.2)	−13.9 (7.0)	−11.7 (10.9)	−6.1 (21.0)	−3.3 (26.1)	−0.3 (31.5)	2.8 (37.0)	1.6 (34.9)	−0.8 (30.6)	−6.1 (21.0)	−8.6 (16.5)	−13.1 (8.4)	−20.1 (−4.2)
Average precipitation mm (inches)	78.0 (3.07)	65.8 (2.59)	51.3 (2.02)	69.2 (2.72)	65.5 (2.58)	71.3 (2.81)	70.4 (2.77)	72.3 (2.85)	69.2 (2.72)	80.5 (3.17)	88.8 (3.50)	84.8 (3.34)	867.2 (34.14)
Average precipitation days (≥ 1.0 mm)	12.8	11.0	10.7	11.4	11.0	10.5	10.7	11.2	10.2	12.6	13.7	13.4	139.0
Mean monthly sunshine hours	56.9	80.0	116.1	158.6	195.0	189.4	200.6	181.2	141.4	106.5	64.3	52.8	1,542.8
Source 1: Met Office
Source 2: Starlings Roost Weather

== Potential merger of Cheltenham and Gloucester ==
In May 2024, under plans by Gloucestershire County Council, it was reported that there are secret talks to formally merge the conurbations of Cheltenham and Gloucester with each other. The plans suggest that around ten new garden towns could be built around the green belt at Boddington which if removed would result in the complete merger of both boroughs. Doing so would facilitate and effectively merge the two into a supercity. The move has been criticised by both Cheltenham Borough Council and Gloucester City Council.

== Demography ==
Population pyramid of Gloucester in 2021

=== Ethnicity ===
Ethnic group	Year									
Ethnic group	1981 estimations		1991		2001		2011		2021	
Ethnic group	Number	%	Number	%	Number	%	Number	%	Number	%
White: Total	84,386	94.7%	95,791	94.3%	101,692	92.5%	108,462	89.1%	112,461	84.9%
White: British	–	–	–	–	99,045	90.1%	102,912	84.6%	103,317	78.0%
White: Irish	–	–	–	–	1,101		850		800	0.6%
White: Gypsy or Irish Traveller	–	–	–	–	–	–	136		224	0.2%
White: Roma	–	–	–	–	–	–	–	–	296	0.2%
White: Other	–	–	–	–	1,546		4,564		7,824	5.9%
Asian or Asian British: Total	–	–	2,426		3,330	3%	5,839	4.8%	8,543	6.5%
Asian or Asian British: Indian	–	–	1,707		2,108		3,204		4,481	3.4%
Asian or Asian British: Pakistani	–	–	177		301		639		1,160	0.9%
Asian or Asian British: Bangladeshi	–	–	94		357		490		802	0.6%
Asian or Asian British: Chinese	–	–	214		289		448		497	0.4%
Asian or Asian British: Other Asian	–	–	234		275		1,058		1,603	1.2%
Black or Black British: Total	–	–	2,786	2.7%	2,523	2.3%	3,486	2.9%	4,826	3.6%
Black or Black British: Caribbean	–	–	2,042		2,044		1,880		2,149	1.6%
Black or Black British: African	–	–	127		241		1,100		1,912	1.4%
Black or Black British: Other Black	–	–	617		238		506		765	0.6%
Mixed or British Mixed: Total	–	–	–	–	2,103	1.9%	3,565	2.9%	5,014	3.8%
Mixed: White and Black Caribbean	–	–	–	–	1,310		2,139		2,694	2.0%
Mixed: White and Black African	–	–	–	–	121		316		569	0.4%
Mixed: White and Asian	–	–	–	–	341		551		869	0.7%
Mixed: Other Mixed	–	–	–	–	331		559		882	0.7%
Other: Total	–	–	596	0.6%	237	0.2%	336	0.3%	1,570	1.2%
Other: Arab	–	–	–	–	–	–	119		332	0.3%
Other: Any other ethnic group	–	–	596		237		217		1,238	0.9%
Non-White: Total	4,687	5.3%	5,808	5.7%	8,193	7.5%	13,226	10.9%	19,953	15.1%
Total	89,073	100%	101,599	100%	109,885	100%	121,688	100%	132,414	100%

=== Religion ===
Religion	2001		2011		2021	
Religion	Number	%	Number	%	Number	%
Holds religious beliefs	85,280	77.6	81,488	67.0	72,001	54.3
Christian	81,687	74.3	75,881	62.4	63,145	47.7
Buddhist	150	0.1	311	0.3	401	0.3
Hindu	488	0.4	728	0.6	1,283	1.0
Jewish	68	0.1	50	<0.1	64	<0.1
Muslim	2,477	2.3	3,885	3.2	6,200	4.7
Sikh	87	0.1	134	0.1	255	0.2
Other religion	323	0.3	499	0.4	652	0.5
No religion	15,661	14.3	31,851	26.2	52,507	39.7
Religion not stated	8,944	8.1	8,349	6.9	7,908	6.0
Total population	109,885	100.0	121,688	100.0	132,416	100.0

== Attractions ==
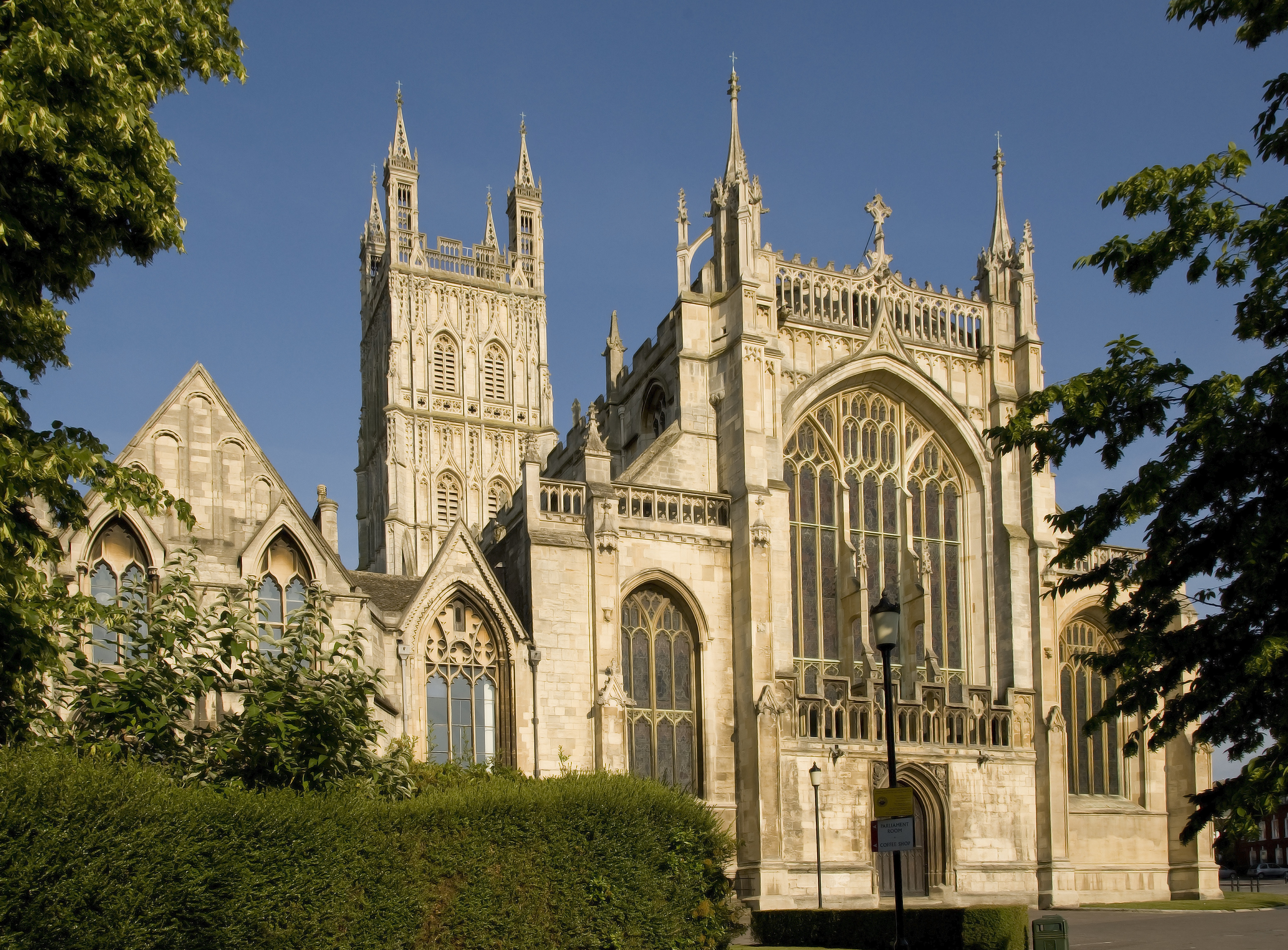
Gloucester Cathedral

Gloucester Cathedral, in the north of the city near the river, originates in the foundation of an abbey dedicated to Saint Peter in 681. It is the burial place of King Edward II and Walter de Lacy. The cathedral (mainly its cloisters) was used for corridor scenes in the films Harry Potter and the Philosopher's Stone, Harry Potter and the Chamber of Secrets and Harry Potter and the Half Blood Prince. The crypt was used for a scene in Sherlock Christmas special. Attached to the deanery is the Norman prior's chapel. In St Mary's Square outside the Abbey gate, the Bishop of Gloucester, Bishop John Hooper, was martyred under Queen Mary I in 1555.

A good number of medieval and Tudor period gabled and half timbered houses survive from earlier periods of Gloucester's history. The Old Judges House, at 26 Westgate Street, is the largest surviving medieval timber-framed building in England and has undergone a major restoration by English Heritage. The building is Grade I listed. At the point where the four principal streets intersected stood the Tolsey (town hall), which was replaced by a modern building in 1894. None of the old public buildings are left except for the New Inn in Northgate Street. It is a timbered house, with strong, massive external galleries and courtyards. It was built around 1450 by John Twyning, a monk.

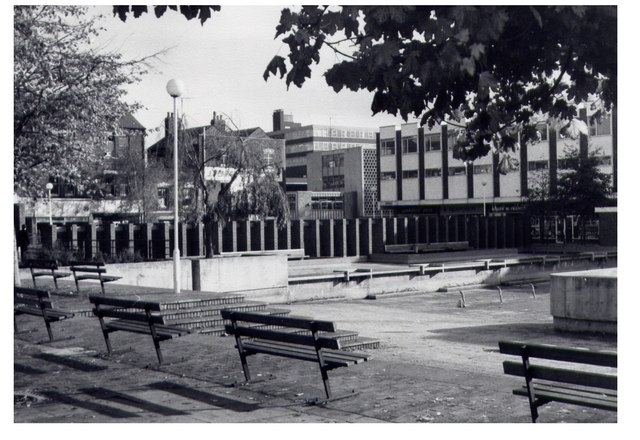
Kings Square (1976)

Kings Square is at the heart of the city centre and occupies what was once a cattle market and bus station. Officially opened in 1972, it was the centrepiece of a radical redesign of the city, The Jellicoe Plan, which was first proposed in 1961. It stands beside the Debenham's (formerly Bon Marché) store built in the early 1960s. Many of the features of the redevelopment have since been dismantled; the brutalist concrete fountains in the middle of the square have gone and the overhead roadways which linked three multi storey car parks around the centre have been either closed or dismantled. The main bus station received a Civic Trust Award in 1963 but has since been demolished, with a new bus station being constructed on the same site during 2018. In 2012 a £60 million plan was unveiled to revamp the square. In 2014, the prominent Golden Egg restaurant was demolished and a new look public space was created. A prior archaeological dig revealed a Roman house underneath.

An indoor market opened in Eastgate Street in 1968, followed by the Eastgate Shopping Centre in 1973. The Kings Walk Shopping Centre was built between 1969 and 1972. The corner of Eastgate Street and Brunswick Road was redeveloped around this time; Roman remains unearthed below street level in 1974 may be seen through a glass observation panel outside the Boots building, which opened in 1980. The HSBC building on the Cross was renovated and a modern extension added to the Westgate Street aspect in 1972 which received a Civic Trust Award. Sainsbury's opened a supermarket in Northgate Street in 1970; it retains its original interior. Opposite, Tesco opened a large two-storey supermarket in June 1976 on the site of a demolished chapel. This is now occupied by Wilkinson's after Tesco moved to Quedgeley in 1984. Asda opened its first store in Gloucester in Bruton Way in 1983.

Gloucester Leisure Centre opened on the corner of Eastgate Street and Bruton Way in September 1974 and was redeveloped and rebranded (as "GL1") in August 2002. Gloucester Central railway station was rebuilt in 1977 to serve both the original traffic to that railway station and the services from the closed Gloucester Eastgate railway station (former Midland Railway) which had stood on another site further east along the same road. Opposite the station stands one of the city's largest office blocks, Twyver House, opened in 1968, which houses the regional Land Registry. The main shopping streets were pedestrianised in the late 1980s.

The 1966 Heights Plan for Gloucester sought to restrict construction of tall buildings and defend spiritual values by protecting views of Gloucester Cathedral. The tower of Gloucestershire Royal Hospital, started in 1970 and completed in August 1975, can be seen from miles around. In Brunswick Road, a brown concrete tower, which housed classrooms at the Gloucestershire College of Arts and Technology (now moved to a site near Llanthony Bridge). The tower was added incongruously to the existing 1930s Technical College buildings in 1971 which has now been demolished. Clapham Court, a tall block of flats, stands in Columbia Close, between London Road and Kingsholm Road. It was built in 1963 and stands on what was once Columbia Street in a small district formerly known as Clapham.

Other features of interest include the museum and school of art and science, the former county jail (on the site of a Saxon and Norman castle), the Shire Hall (now headquarters of the County Council) and the Whitefield memorial church. A park in the south of the city contains a spa, a chalybeate spring having been discovered in 1814. West of this, across the canal, are the remains (a gateway and some walls) of Llanthony Secunda Priory, a cell of the mother abbey in the Vale of Ewyas, Monmouthshire, which in the reign of King Edward IV became the secondary establishment.

The city's Northgate and Southgate streets feature a series of public art mosaic panels depicting Gloucester's medieval trades made by artists Gary Drostle and Rob Turner in 1998 and 1999. Eastgate and Westgate streets feature a series of mosaic panels made by arts group 'The Pioneers'.

== Culture ==
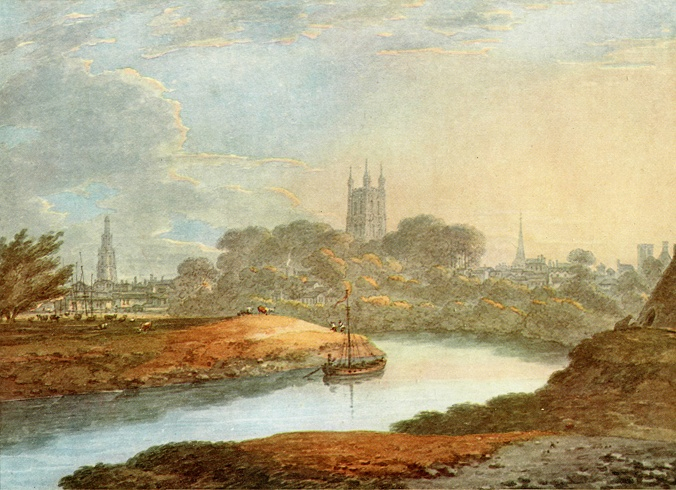
View of Gloucester by Thomas Hearne, watercolour

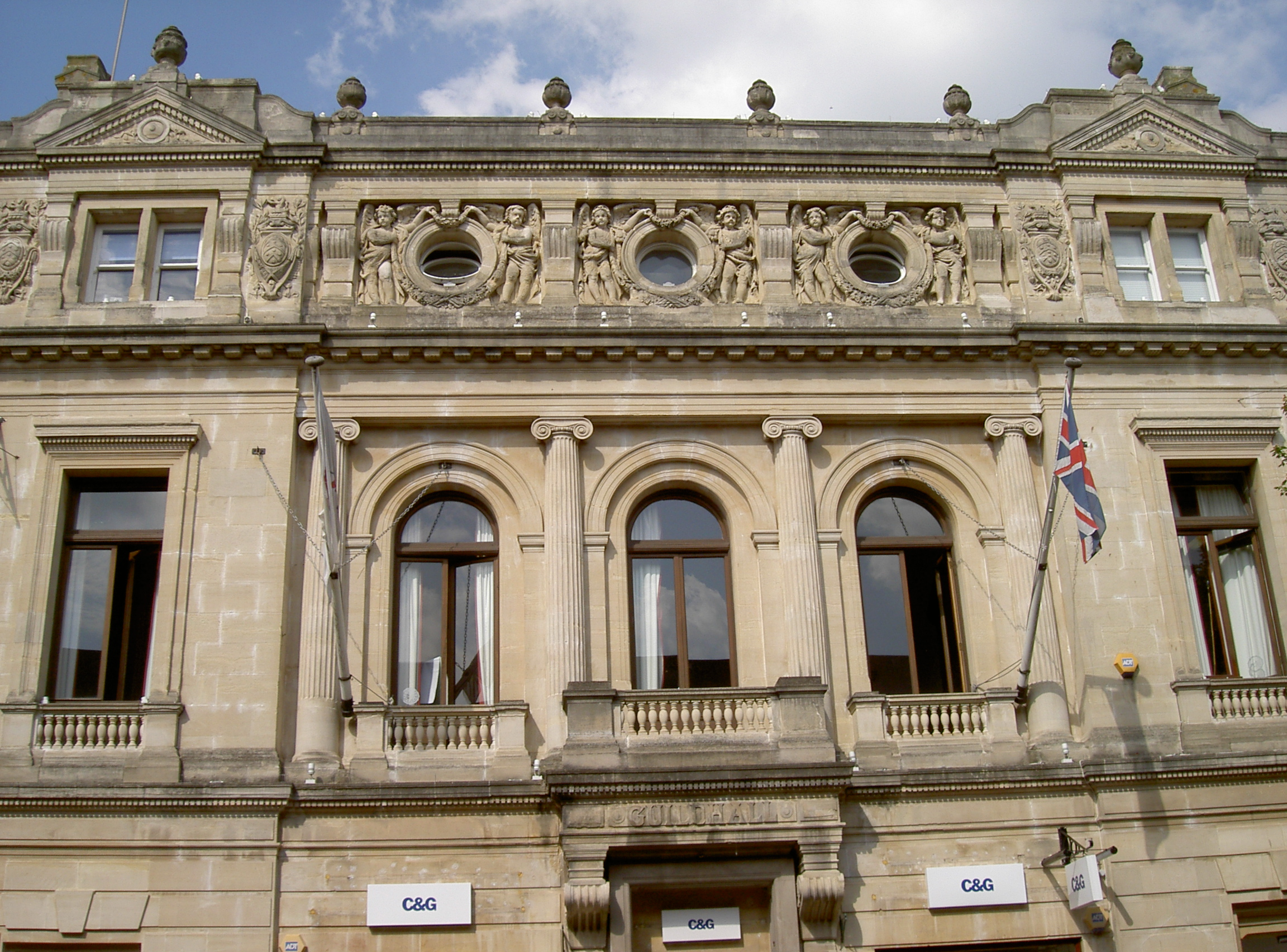
The architecture of Gloucester Guildhall

The Three Choirs Festival, originating in the 18th century and one of the oldest music festivals in the British Isles, is held in Gloucester every third year, the other venues being Hereford and Worcester. Gloucester hosted the festival in 2019, and it is next due in the city in 2023.

The city's main theatre and cultural venue is the Guildhall. The Guildhall hosts a huge amount of entertainment, including live music, dance sessions, a cinema, bar, café, art gallery and much more. The Leisure Centre, GL1, hosts concerts and has a larger capacity than the Guildhall.

The annual Gloucester International Rhythm and Blues Festival takes place at the end of July and early August. Gloucester International Cajun and Zydeco Festival, the largest in the UK and longest-running in Europe, runs for a weekend in January each year. A Medieval Fayre is held in Westgate Street each year during the summer.

Gloucester is also noted as the home of the Frightmare Halloween Festival, the largest Halloween festival in the South West.

The main museum in the city is The Museum of Gloucester but there are several other important museums.

The Tailor of Gloucester House which is dedicated to the author Beatrix Potter can be found near the cathedral.

Since 2013 Gloucester has marked Armed Forces Day with a Drum Head Service held on College Green in the shadow of the cathedral. This is followed by a parade of serving forces, veterans and cadets through the city centre to the docks for a family day with military and military-related charity displays and entertainment in Back Badge Square in front of the Soldiers of Gloucestershire Museum.

Nature in Art is a gallery dedicated to the display of works of art inspired by the natural world.

The city features in the popular, well-known nursery rhyme (of unknown date and origin) about a Doctor Foster, who reportedly visited the city, got wet, and swore to stay away as a result.

== Churches ==
Gloucester has many churches, and historically has also had many dissenting chapels. It may have been the old proverb "as sure as God's in Gloucester" that provoked Oliver Cromwell to declare that the city had "more churches than godliness". Gloucester was the host of the first Sunday school in England; this was founded by Robert Raikes in 1780. Four of the churches that are of special interest are

- St Mary de Lode – with a Norman tower and chancel, and a monument of Bishop John Hooper. It was built on the site of an ancient Roman temple which became the first Christian church in Britain
- St Mary de Crypt – with a cruciform structure of the 12th century. It has later additions, such as the tower. Also the site of the Schoolroom in which the Crypt School was formed
- St Michael's Church – said to have been connected with St Peter's ancient abbey
- St Nicholas's Church – founded by the Normans but with many additions since then

In the neighbourhood around St Mary de Crypt there are slight remains of Greyfriars and Blackfriars monasteries, and also of the city wall. Under the Golden Fleece (The Monks Bar) and Saracen's Head inns early vaulted cellars still remains. In addition, in the city is St Peter's Roman Catholic Church, a Grade II* listed building.

During the construction of the Boots store on the corner of Brunswick Road and Eastgate Street in 1974, Roman remains were found. These can be seen through a glass case on the street. At the back of the Gloucester Furniture Exhibition Centre part of the city's South Gate can be seen.

== Education ==
There are three endowed schools: the historic King's School, refounded by Henry VIII as part of the cathedral establishment; the school of St Mary de Crypt, now known as "The Crypt School, Gloucester" since it moved to a mile from town centre to Podsmead, founded by Dame Joan Cooke in the same reign (1539); Sir Thomas Rich's School, previously known as Sir Thomas Rich's Bluecoat Hospital for Boys (1666); the High School for Girls (1883); and Ribston Hall High School for Girls. Comprehensives include Henley Bank High School, Holmleigh Park High School, St Peter's High School (Catholic school), Chosen Hill School, Severn Vale School, Gloucester Academy, Barnwood Park School and Churchdown School Academy. There is a Steiner Waldorf School founded in 1937 with a High School added just after the Second World War.

The city is home to one of three campuses of the University of Gloucestershire, based at Oxstalls, just outside the city centre. The university has also purchased the former Debenhams store in the city centre with a new campus due to open there in 2023. The university also manages student accommodation and halls of residence in the city, with the other campuses based in Cheltenham 7 miles away.

== Transport ==
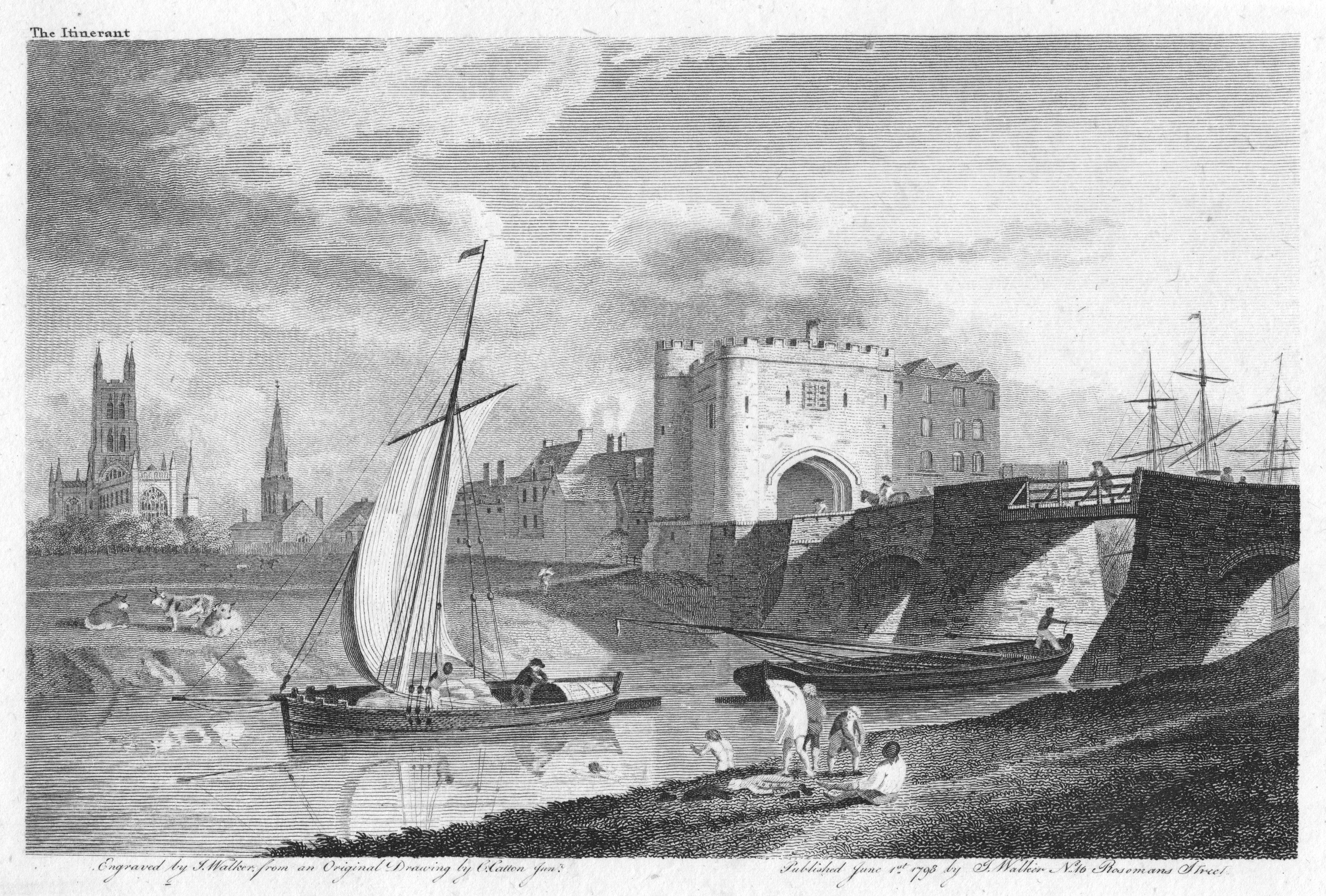
Cargo boats, known as trows, navigating under a bridge at Gloucester

=== Roads ===
The M5 motorway, opened in 1971, runs east of the city boundary. Junction 12 serves south Gloucester and Quedgeley; junction 11a serves central Gloucester; and junction 11 serves north Gloucester. The A38 runs north–south through Gloucester, connecting the city with Tewkesbury and Bristol. The A40 runs west to east, connecting Gloucester with Cheltenham to the east (via a dual carriageway section known as The Golden Valley Bypass) and the Forest of Dean and South Wales to the West. The A46 and A4173 links Stroud, and the A417 links Cirencester in the south-east and Ledbury in the north-west. Gloucester has a network of cycle paths.

Until the construction of the Severn Bridge in 1966, Gloucester was the lowest road bridging point on the river and hence was an important settlement between South Wales and the southernmost counties of England including London. The Severn has a small anabranch here to reach Alney Island and then the main western bank. A bridge at Over, built by Thomas Telford in 1829, still stands, notable for its very flat arch, but its fragility and narrowness means it is disused; since 1974, it has been paralleled by a modern bridge. The Gloucester to Newport Line railway bridge is close to both, the lowest crossing of the UK's longest river until the Severn Railway Bridge 1879–1960, which was coupled with the Severn Tunnel in 1886, the present holder of that status.

=== Railway ===
Gloucester railway station is served by several train operating companies:

- Transport for Wales operates a route between Maesteg, Bridgend, Cardiff Central, Chepstow and Cheltenham Spa.
- CrossCountry operates Cardiff Central – Nottingham services, via Birmingham New Street.
- Great Western Railway operates services to London Paddington, Swindon, Westbury, Bristol Temple Meads, Cheltenham, Worcester, Great Malvern and Weymouth.

Gloucester was the site of the Gloucester Railway Carriage and Wagon Company railway works, which have now closed. A new station at Hunts Grove has been considered on the southern edge of the city near Quedgeley, as part of MetroWest plans to extend Bristol commuter services to the city.

=== Buses and coaches ===
Most local buses are run by Stagecoach West, centred at a depot on London Road, with connections to Cheltenham, Stroud, Ross-on-Wye and other smaller communities. For many years, there were both stopping and express services to Worcester and Birmingham operated by Midland Red and later Midland Red West, but this connection was lost due to service reductions. National Express Coaches operate the 444 route to London.

=== Canals ===
Gloucester is linked to the Severn Estuary by the Gloucester and Sharpness Canal, which is navigable by small coasters. The city is linked to the River Avon and Stourport-on-Severn by the navigable part of the River Severn, which is navigable by river craft of a few hundred tonnes' displacement. Gloucester Docks mark the Normal Tidal Limit (NTL) of the river. Gloucester was formerly linked to Ledbury and Hereford by the Herefordshire and Gloucestershire Canal; and subsequently by the Ledbury and Gloucester Railway, which used the southern section of the former canal, until it also closed in 1964. This canal is now being restored and the restored canal basin in the adjacent village of Over is a local attraction.

=== Air ===
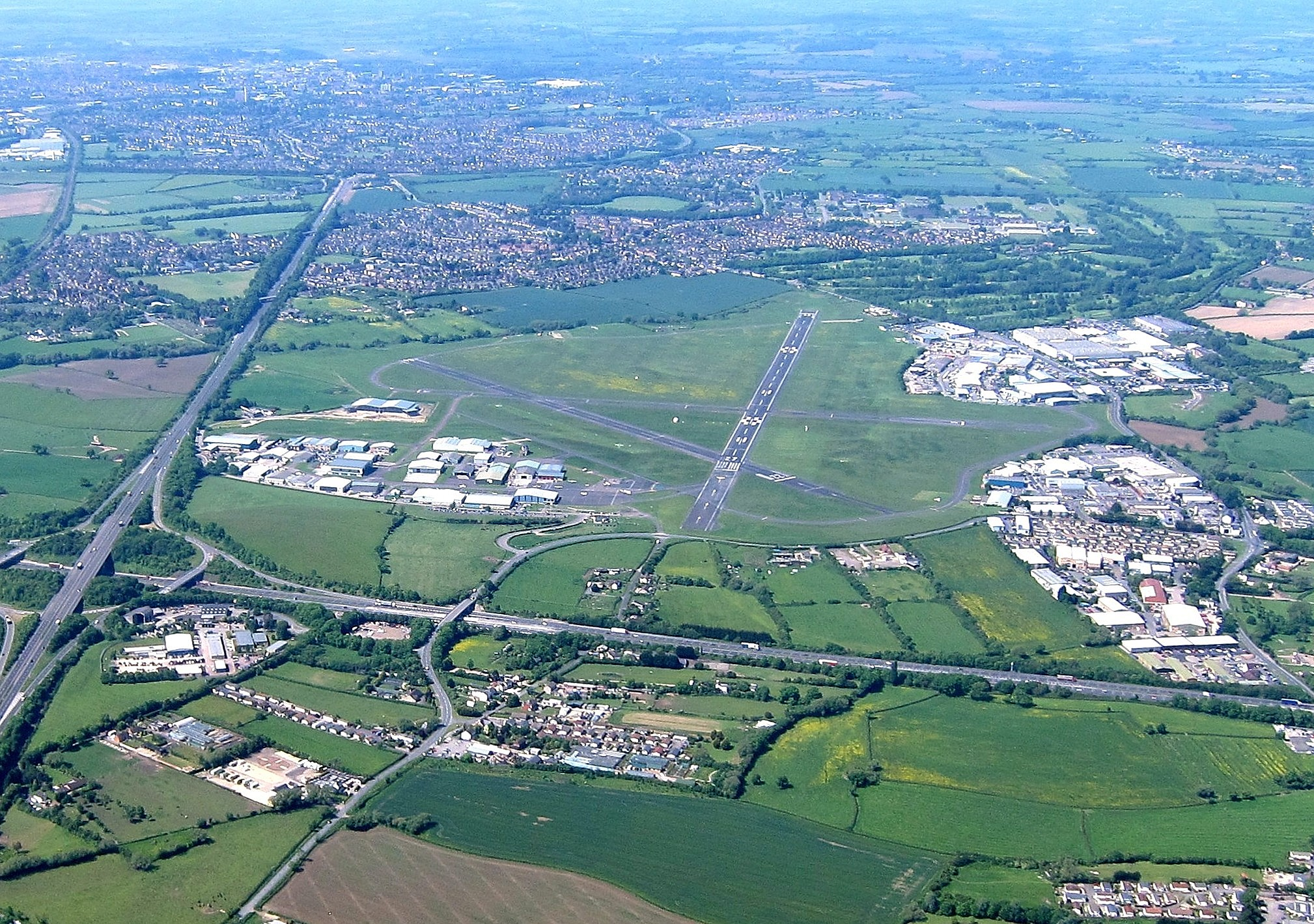
Gloucestershire Airport in 2017, looking east. On the left is the straight A40 road and at the bottom the M5 motorway. Innsworth and Gloucester are at the top.

Commercial airports with scheduled services are Bristol, Birmingham and Cardiff 40–60 miles away; global hub Heathrow is about 100 miles by road and shares with Gloucester its main rail interchange at London Paddington.

Gloucestershire Airport, sited 8 miles east of the city, is a private and special charters airfield.

== Business and industry ==
Gloucester has a long history in the aerospace business. In 1926 the Gloucestershire Aircraft Company at Brockworth changed its name to the Gloster Aircraft Company because international customers claimed that the name "Gloucestershire" was too difficult to spell. A sculpture in the city centre celebrates Gloucester's aviation history and its involvement in the development of the jet engine. Frank Whittle's pioneering turbojet engine powered the Gloster E.28/39, the first British jet aircraft, which first flew at the company's airfield at Brockworth. This is commemorated by the pub "The Whittle" at Gloucester Business Park, which now occupies the site. Roads in the business park are named after other Gloster aircraft and a small statue overlooks the site of the old main runway. Messier-Dowty's landing gear plant and GE Aviation Dowty Propellers plants are on the outskirts of the city.

The large insurer Ecclesiastical Insurance is based in the city, as is its owner, the charity Benefact Trust. Lloyds Banking Group and TSB Bank each have an office in Barnwood, the former previously having been the headquarters of Cheltenham & Gloucester Building Society.

Gloucester was the home of Priday, Metford and Company Limited, a family milling firm which survived for over one hundred years, and hydraulic engineering firm Fielding & Platt.

Gloucester Business Park is a business park on the outskirts on the city and is home to a number of big brands including Fortis and BAE Systems Applied Intelligence.

Unilever Gloucester has made ice cream, such as the Cornetto (frozen dessert) and Viennetta, since 1962, in Barnwood. It has been the largest ice-cream factory in Europe.

== Sport and leisure ==
- Gloucester was a host city for the Rugby World Cup in 1991 and in 2015 when it hosted four matches at the Kingsholm Stadium with national teams from Japan, Georgia, USA, Scotland, Tonga and Argentina.
- Kingsholm Stadium is the ground of Gloucester Rugby, founded in 1873, one of Europe's top rugby union clubs and a member of the Gallagher Premiership. Gloucester–Hartpury, founded in 2014, also play fixtures at Kingsholm; they play in the Allianz Premier 15's, the top flight of England women's rugby union.
- Meadow Park is the home of Gloucester City A.F.C., founded in 1883, of the Southern Football League Premier South. The club played outside of the city from 2007 until 2020 due to the 2007 floods.
- Horton Road Stadium was the home of Gloucester City A.F.C. from 1964 to 1986 and a short lived greyhound racing stadium.
- The Gloucester Cricket Festival is held in Gloucester at the King's School.
- Gloucester City Swimming Club competes in county and national swimming championships.
- Gloucester City Hockey Club is based at the Oxstalls Sports Park, with teams entered in the West Hockey Leagues.
- The Gloucester Banshees American football are based in the city at Oxstalls Tennis Centre, and play at a national level in the British American Football League.
- The university of Gloucestershire All Golds is the city's only professional Rugby league club, playing in the semi professional Championship 1 from 2013. They play their home games at the Prince of Wales Stadium in Cheltenham.
- Gloucestershire Warriors founded in 1997 are an amateur rugby league team that play in the Conference League South playing home games at the Oxstalls Sports Park.
- University of Gloucestershire run Rugby league teams in the BUCS league.
- Public sports facilities are focused on the GL1 leisure centre, a large modern sports centre with several swimming pools, a multi-use sports hall, indoor bowls room, squash courts, gym and health spa.

== Media ==
The Citizen, published by Local World, is Gloucester's main newspaper, which shares all its content with the Gloucestershire Echo and the weekly Forester covering the Forest of Dean and Chepstow. As of 2018, these newspapers have all moved to weekly publication rather than daily.

BBC Radio Gloucestershire has its studios on London Road in Gloucester. Heart West, previously Severn Sound, is based in Bristol. Gloucester FM is a community radio station specialising in black and urban music.

Local radio is broadcast from transmitters on Churchdown Hill (Chosen Hill).

For regional television in Gloucester is covered by BBC West Midlands & BBC West on BBC One and ITV Central & ITV West Country on ITV. Television signals are received from either Ridge Hill or Mendip TV transmitters.

A number of TV and film productions have been filmed in Gloucester; most notably at the cathedral and docks. These include three of the Harry Potter films, Doctor Who, Outlaw and Alice in Wonderland: Through the Looking Glass.

== Twin towns – sister cities ==
Gloucester is twinned with:

- Trier, Germany (1957)
- Metz, France (1967)

Gloucester was also twinned with Gouda in the Netherlands, but this twinning ended in 2015.

== Notable people ==
Notable residents of Gloucester have included:

- Æthelflæd (c.870–918), Lady of the Mercians
- Yasmin Bannerman (b. 1972), actress
- Richard Barrington (b.1990), rugby player
- Piers Bizony (b. 1959), science historian and journalist
- Capel Bond (1730–1790), organist and composer
- Hubert Cecil Booth (1871–1955), inventor of the vacuum cleaner
- Samuel Bowly (1802–1884), slavery abolitionist
- Herbert Brewer (1865–1928), organist and composer
- Sophie Brzeska (1872–1925), writer, died in Gloucester
- Bridget Christie (b. 1972), comedian
- Sir Alastair Cook (b. 1984), cricketer
- George Worrall Counsel (1758–1843), solicitor and antiquarian
- Alex Cuthbert (b. 1990), Welsh international, British & Irish Lions rugby player
- Samuel Daukes (1811–1880), architect
- Dynamite MC (b. 1973), musician
- William Eassie (1805–1861), prefabricated building pioneer
- Janet Evra (b. 1988), jazz musician
- Marcel Garvey (b. 1983), rugby player
- Tom Goddard (1900–1966), cricketer
- Lynval Golding (b. 1951), musician
- Edmond Graile (born about 1577; fl. 1611), English poet
- Phil Greening (b. 1975), rugby player
- Paul Groves (b. 1947), poet
- Ivor Gurney (1890–1937), composer and poet
- Button Gwinnett (1735 – 19 May 1777), second signatory of the United States Declaration of Independence
- William Hayes (1708–1777), composer
- Andy Hazell (b. 1978), rugby player
- William Ernest Henley (1849–1903), poet, critic and editor
- John Hooper (1495–1555), bishop
- Tom Kerridge (b. 1973), chef and media personality
- Leopold Kohr (1909–1994), philosopher and economist
- David Lawrence (b. 1964), former England cricketer
- Naomi Layzell (b. 2004), footballer for Manchester City
- Mary-Jess Leaverland (b. 1990), singer
- Thomas Machen (c. 1541–1614), mayor of Gloucester three times and Member of Parliament (MP) once
- Edward Massey (1619–1674), soldier, governor and MP
- Tina May (1961–2022), jazz vocalist
- Jamie McDonald (b. 1986), adventurer and author
- Osric, king of the Hwicce (7th century)
- Simon Pegg (b. 1970), actor, comedian and writer
- Sir John Powell (1645–1713), lawyer and MP
- Robert Raikes the Elder (1690–1757), "the printer of Gloucester", founder of the Gloucester Journal, early pioneer of press freedom, buried in church of St Mary de Crypt
- Robert Raikes (1735–1811), English philanthropist and Anglican layman, noted for his promotion of Sunday schools
- Thomas Raikes (1741–1813), banker and merchant in London, who as Bank of England governor issued the first £1 and £2 English pound notes in 1797
- Scott Redding (b. 1993), motorcyclist
- Tyler Roberts (b. 1999), football player
- John Stafford Smith (1750–1836), composer of the American national anthem
- Charlie Stayt (b. 1962), journalist and presenter
- Nathan Sykes (b. 1993), former member of British boyband the Wanted
- John Taylor (1578–1653), poet
- Mike Teague (b. 1960), former England rugby union footballer
- Josiah Tucker (1713–1799), dean, economist and political writer
- Abel Wantner (c. 1639–1714) Historian
- Fred West (1941–1995) and Rose West (b. 1953) serial killers who tortured, raped and murdered at least 12 young women, while they lived in Gloucester
- Charles Wheatstone (1802–1875), scientist and inventor
- George Whitefield (1714–1770), Church of England minister and a leader in the Methodist movement
- John Clarke Whitfield (1770–1836), organist and composer
- Chris Whitty (b. 1966), Chief Medical Officer for England
- Charles Henry Wilton (1761–1832), violinist and composer
- Jemmy Wood (1756–1836), legendary miser and owner of the Gloucester Old Bank
- Charles S. Raleigh (1831–1925), painter

== See also ==
- Bibliography of the City of Gloucester
- List of Gloucester MPs
- Gloucester Tramways Company
- Gloucester Corporation Tramways
- Listed buildings in Gloucester
