= Edmond Graile =

English poet

Edmond Graile (fl. 1611), was an English poet.

Graile was born at Gloucester about 1577. He matriculated at Magdalen College, Oxford, on 10 February 1592 – 1593, graduated B.A. in February 1594–5, and M.A. in 1600. He was afterwards physician of St. Bartholomew's Hospital, Gloucester. He was author of Little Timothie, his Lesson, a Summarie relation of the Historicall part of Holy Scripture, plainely and familiarly comprized in meeter, London, 1611, 8vo, dedicated to the president and governors of St. Bartholomew's Hospital, Gloucester. Verses to Sir William Throckmorton and his wife are prefixed. 'The third impression,' with an appendix of original prayers, was issued in 1632, 8vo, and of this edition alone is there a copy in the British Museum.
