= Gloucester Public Library =

Public library in Gloucester, Gloucestershire, England

Coordinates: 51.8631°N 2.2450°W

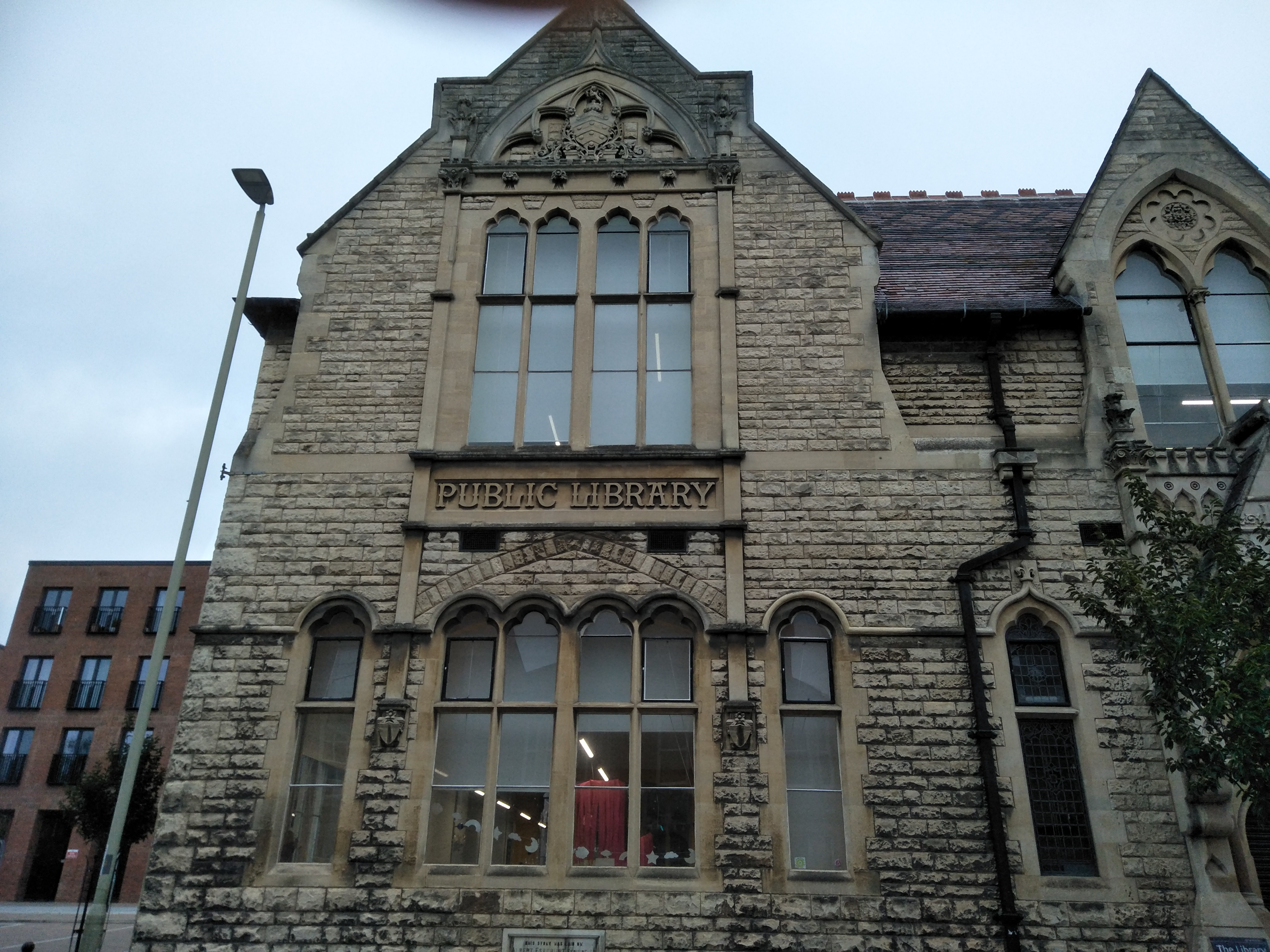
- Location: Gloucester, Gloucestershire
- Type: public library
- Established: 1897
- Branch of: Gloucestershire Libraries

Collection
- Size: 52,017

Access and use
- Access requirements: None

Other information
- Website: www.gloucestershire.gov.uk/libraries/find-a-library/gloucester-library-including-music-and-performing-arts/

Gloucester Public Library is a building on Brunswick Road, Gloucester, England. It was used as a public library until the site was closed in September 2025, when the library moved to a new site in King's Square, Gloucester. The building has been listed Grade II on the National Heritage List for England since 1973.

== History ==
Originally called the Schools of Science and Art, the original part of the building was built by FullJames Waller & Son in 1872 for the Gloucester Science and Art Society which was mainly funded by subscribers. It also housed a museum of Literature and Science. There were several failed attempts to run a free public library at the Working Men's Institute and a survey from 1887 shows that taxpayers voted against having a free public library. In 1893, the building was extended with a hall built for the Gloucester Science and Art Society called the "Price Memorial Hall". The city corporation brought the book collection of the Gloucester Literary and Scientific Association in 1895 and took over the buildings and running of the school and museum in 1896. In 1897, a free library service was started. The building was extended to the south in 1900 to house the new library, which was built to mark Queen Victoria's Diamond Jubilee and designed by F.W Waller.

The building finally opened as a public library in 1900. The library opened with Roland Austin's Gloucestershire Collection of local history which has since moved to the Gloucestershire Archives in 2005.

In 1902, the Price Memorial Hall was converted to be used as part of the museum which became The Museum of Gloucester.

In 1990 a rare piece of choral music by Sir Edward Elgar was found in a plain envelope in the library's collections, 83 years after it disappeared.

== Architecture ==
The library building is designed in the Neo-Gothic style. It was inspired by the work of George Edmund Street. It consists of five bays parallel to the street with cross-gabled right angle ranges at each end. The two bays and right angle range at the north end of the building are the original part built in 1872 and southern end is the newer part built in 1900. It has two storeys and a cellar. There are two entrances on each of the end bays. All the bays have large ground and first floor windows apart from where the entrances are located. The newer southern entrance has the year 1900 engraved above it, and the southern range has the words "public library" engraved between the ground and first floor windows. Inside the main reading room is braced out to support a glazed atrium roof.

The adjoining Price Memorial Hall is built in the renaissance style.

== Collection ==
As well as a book collection, the library includes a dedicated Music and Performing Arts collection which has a large collection of vocal scores and orchestral sets.
