= Holmleigh Park High School =

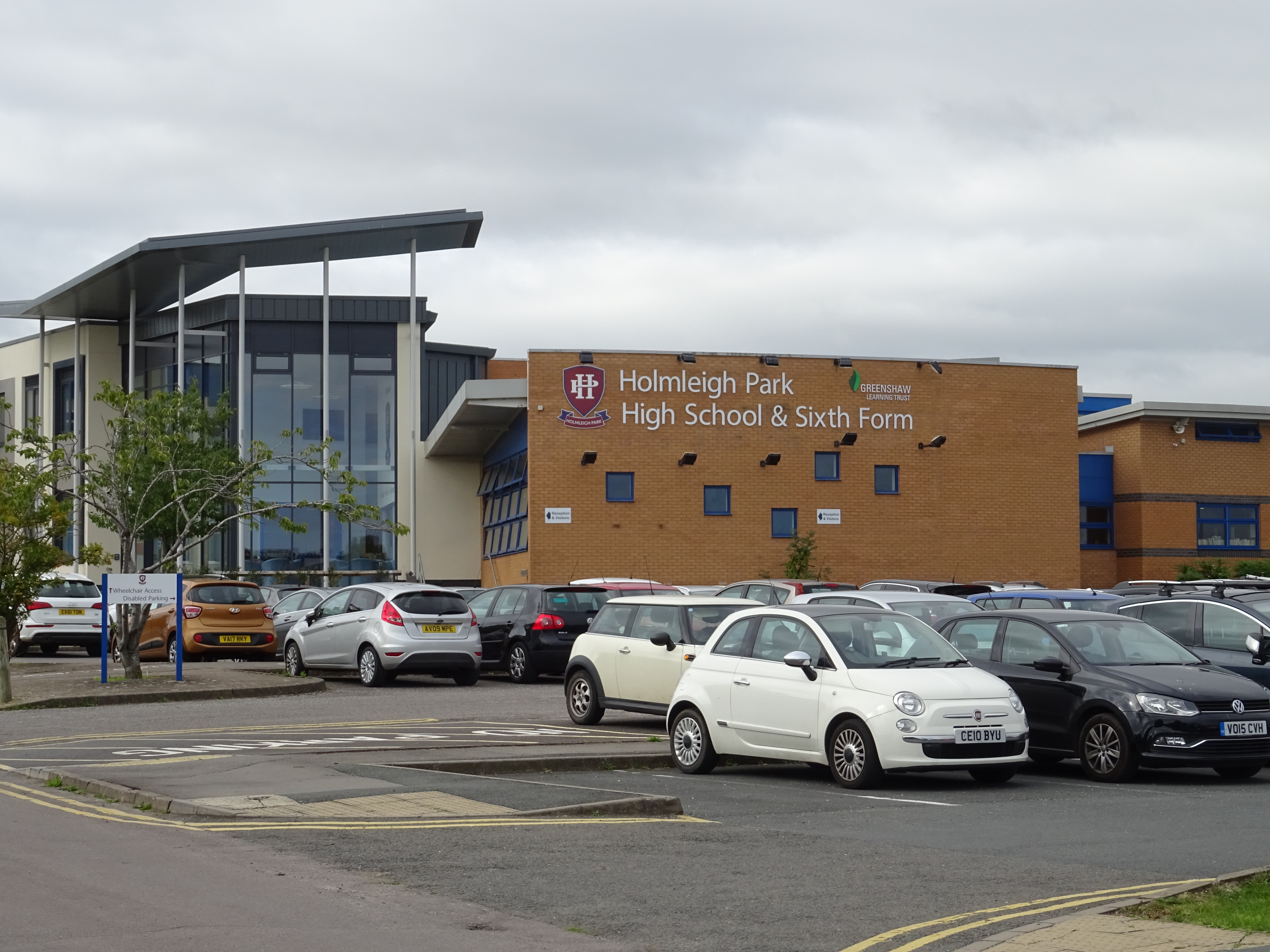

Location
- Holmleigh Road; Tuffley, Gloucestershire, GL4 0RT; England; 51.82875°N 2.26280°W

Information
- Type: Academy
- Established: 2019
- Trust: Greenshaw Learning Trust
- Department for Education URN: 147300 Tables
- Ofsted: Reports
- Headteacher: Dan Hudson
- Gender: Mixed
- Age: 11 to 18
- Capacity: 1,455
- Website: https://www.hphigh.co.uk/

Holmleigh Park High School is a co-educational secondary school and sixth form with academy status in Tuffley, Gloucester, Gloucestershire, England. The number of pupils currently attending is approximately 1,152. Headteacher Dan Hudson took over in June 2023.

== History ==
The school opened in 1971 as Beaufort School. It was later renamed Beaufort Community School. In September 2010, The academy opened its new Sixth Form Centre and also became a member of The South Gloucester Learning Trust with four other local schools. In October 2013, the school converted to academy status, as part of the OUR Co-operative Academies Trust.

In September 2019, the academy was rebranded and joined the Greenshaw Learning Trust, following several years of underperformance. A new Headteacher was appointed, and the school relaunched as Holmleigh Park High School, with a new uniform and new school rules. In particular, strict new rules have been introduced around uniform, behaviour and homework completion. The new headteacher was Patrick Farmbrough who started on 1 September 2019.

== Uniform ==
Uniform, current (as of 19 December 2025):

Keystage	Blazer/Jumper	Shirt	Tie
KS3	Navy blazer with Holmleigh Park Logo	Light Blue	Maroon (Navy Stripes)
KS4	Navy blazer with Holmleigh Park Logo	Light Blue	Maroon (Navy Stripes)
KS5	Black, Navy or Grey	Formal, any colour	Maroon (or lapel pin)

== Performance and Issues ==
In 2003, Beaufort school had improving results and had won several awards.

However, by December 2018, the school's Progress 8 was in the bottom 1% of the country, with results categorised as well below average. There were also concerns raised about bullying in the school. The school was rated inadequate by Ofsted in December 2018 and placed in Special Measures.

As a result, the school elected to join the Greenshaw Learning Trust, a Multi Academy Trust with a strong history of improving performance in Gloucestershire. Beaufort Cooperative Academy officially closed on 31 May 2019. Holmleigh Park High School opened on 1 June, as a new school with a separate URN number.

Since reopening, a number of new staff have been appointed, including the new Headteacher, Patrick Farmbrough. The school has introduced new rules around behaviour and uniform, and encourages parents to visit, without appointment, to look at the school's standards. A new curriculum has been introduced throughout the school, and a daily reading programme introduced. The school day has also been extended for Year 11 and Year 13. The school has launched an expanded character programme, including The Duke of Edinburgh's Award and academic Ivy League lectures at university level at the school.

== Holmleigh Park Sports Centre ==
The sports centre was opened in September 1974. It is used exclusively by students during school hours but is open for public use in the evenings/weekends and school holidays. The facilities available include a large sports hall, a small sports hall, 2 outdoor football pitches, a swimming pool, tennis courts, a squash court, a health and fitness studio and cafe area.
