= Gloucester Academy =

Location
- Painswick Road; Gloucester, Gloucestershire, GL4 6RN; England
- Coordinates: 51°50′44″N 2°13′27″W

Information
- Type: Academy
- Motto: A Better Chance of Success.
- Trust: Greenshaw Learning Trust
- Department for Education URN: 136199 Tables
- Ofsted: Reports
- Headteacher: Phillipa Lewis
- Gender: Co-educational
- Age: 11 to 16
- Website: https://www.gloucesteracademy.co.uk

Gloucester Academy, was formed as a merger of Bishop's College, a mixed CofE school and Central Technology College, a boys school, starting life on the site of the old Technology College located in Derby Road, Gloucester, England. It was converted to an academy in September 2010. It educates 825 students aged 11 to 16.

== Gloucester Academy, Greenshaw Learning Trust ==
Gloucester Academy is a co-educational, fully comprehensive school for students aged 11 to 16 years old in Gloucester., Managed by Greenshaw Learning Trust from 1 June 2020. The headteacher is Phillipa Lewis.

== History ==
The school has had a long past of changes of management over the years,

Mrs H. Anthony took over the role of Headmistress from E. Cole in 2006. The incorporation of the Ninestiles Foundation, and Sir D. Hutt improved the school's reputation. The Multi Use Games Area (M.U.G.A) sports facility was opened in 2007. The Central Technology College was closed in 2010 to make way for a new academy. The former Central Technology College building (located in Cotteswold Road) was used temporarily as the academy site, until the new building was completed. In September 2013, the new building was completed and all academy operations were transferred on to the new site (now located on Painswick Road). The building cost around £15 million to construct, but was almost cancelled on several occasions, as local residents were unhappy with possible light pollution and noise the new site would bring. However, after many negotiations, all parties were happy by December 2012 and construction began.

As an academy, the school was previously part of the Prospects Academies Trust. The trust oversaw the introduction of a new headteacher 'Mr S Badat', who had worked in many challenging schools previously, for example The Essa Academy in Bolton. However, in May 2014 it was announced that the trust was to cease operations, and Gloucester Academy formally joined the White Horse Federation in March 2015.

On 1 June 2020 the academy was officially overtaken by Greenshaw Learning Trust. It was Late January when the switch was prompted. Headteacher, Mr Paul Holroyd, was replaced by Mr Johnathan Heap.

Before Gloucester Academy was changed to being managed by Greenshaw Learning Trust, Gloucester Academy has had 13 Head Teachers/Principals since opening in 2010. Some of these were substantive Principles whilst others were temporary post holders. This has led to a huge issue with stability at the academy, which has led to a lack of improvement and development as the academy has been in Special Measures or Inadequate for 7 out of the 9 years that it has been in operation.

Out of the 19 Principals, only three have been permanent positions:

Mr John Reilly: Stepped down as headteacher in September 2013, after overseeing the new building finished and all operations transferred to the new site following a poor ofsted report and weak exam results.

Mr Showk Badat: a so-called ‘superhead’ brought to the Academy by Prospects Trust to help raise achievement and improve the 'school community'. Mr Badat also shortened the academy day on Friday, and introduced 'Enrichment Activities' for pupils to take part in. His overall plan was to provide every pupil with their own iPad to use in the classroom to aid with their learning. However he resigned on 22 May 2015 due to family commitments. He was later replaced by Mr Ian Frost.

Mr Ian Frost: Took over the top job in September 2015, and initially had some success with the school being removed from Special Measures and being rated as Requires Improvement with a Good judgement for Leadership & Management by Ofsted. Despite this, improvements were not sustained and exam outcomes were poor, Mr Frost subsequently resigned with immediate effect in April 2018 following the school being placed in Special Measures for the third time since opening in 2010. He has been replaced for the moment by the current Vice Principal Mr Andy Vinton who is Acting Principal, supported by White Horse Federation's Director of School Improvement Mrs Helen Glass, who was previously Headteacher at Gloucester Academy's predecessor school Central Technology College. In September 2018 it was announced that Mrs Glass had resigned from her role along with three members of the governing body.

Mr Jonathan Heap: Thanks to the movement from White Horse Federation to Greenshaw Learning Trust, Mr Heap took over the job in February 2020.
