= Wellington Parade =

Group of residential buildings

Coordinates: 51°52′02″N 2°14′19″W

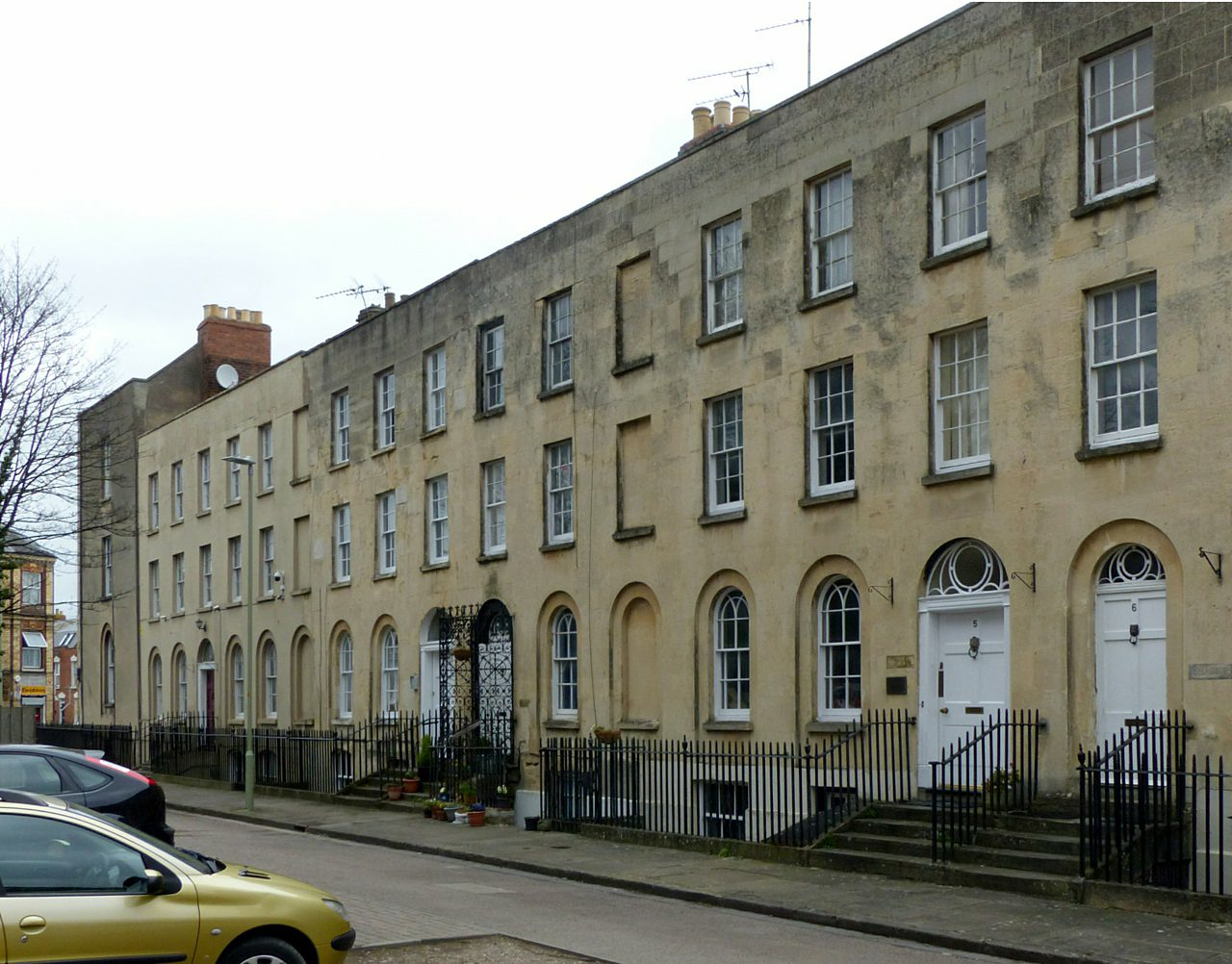
Wellington Parade

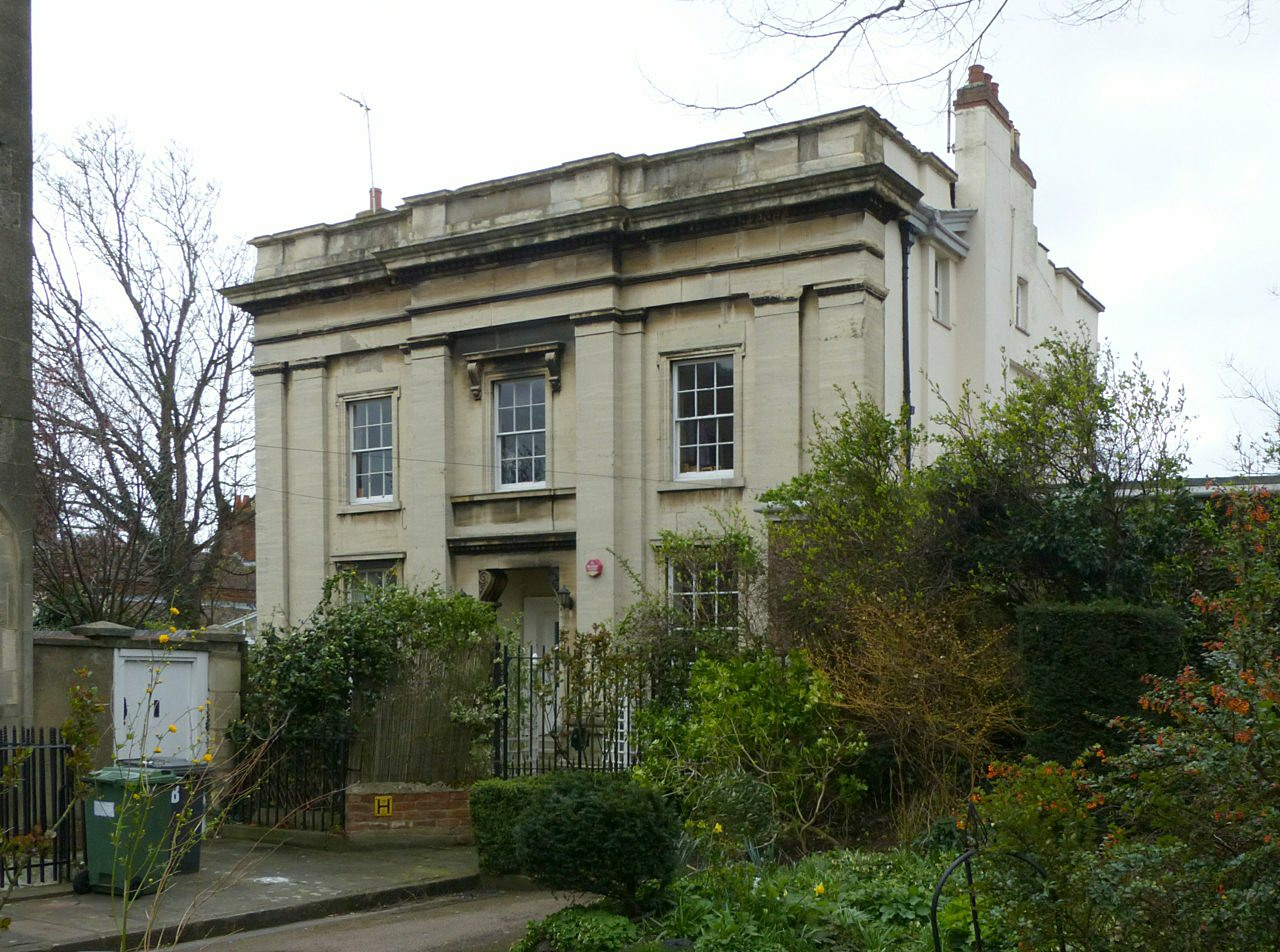
Picton House

Wellington Parade is a terrace of houses in the City of Gloucester, England, the whole of which is Grade II listed.

It runs south from London Road, parallel with Great Western Road. At the south end of the terrace is the grade II listed Picton House (c.1825).

At the north end on the corner with London Road is Sheraton House.
