= Charles S. Raleigh =

British-American painter (1831–1925)

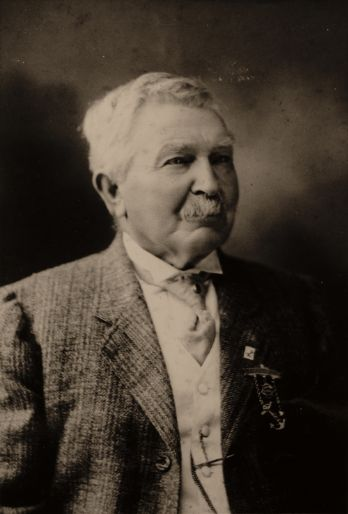
- Born: Charles Sidney Raleigh; 1830; Gloucester, England
- Died: March 28, 1925 (aged 94–95); Bourne, Massachusetts, U.S.
- Citizenship: American
- Occupations: Painter; sailor

Charles Sidney Raleigh (1830 – March 28, 1925) was a British-American painter born in Gloucester, England.

== Early life and career ==
Charles Sidney Raleigh was born in 1831 in Gloucester, England; he ran away when he was ten years old to sea and boarded a naval ship commanded by his uncle. He served in the United States Navy during the Mexican–American War and later became a merchant navy. In 1887 he got married and settled in New Bedford, Massachusetts. Raleigh was a self-taught artist who was an expert in ship portraits in the folk art tradition.

He also became a house painter and decorator. Raleigh often advertised himself as a “house, sign, ornamental, and carriage painter", although he painted over six hundred paintings of vessels. Raleigh's most famous painting is the Law of the Wild, painted in 1881.

== Portrait gallery ==
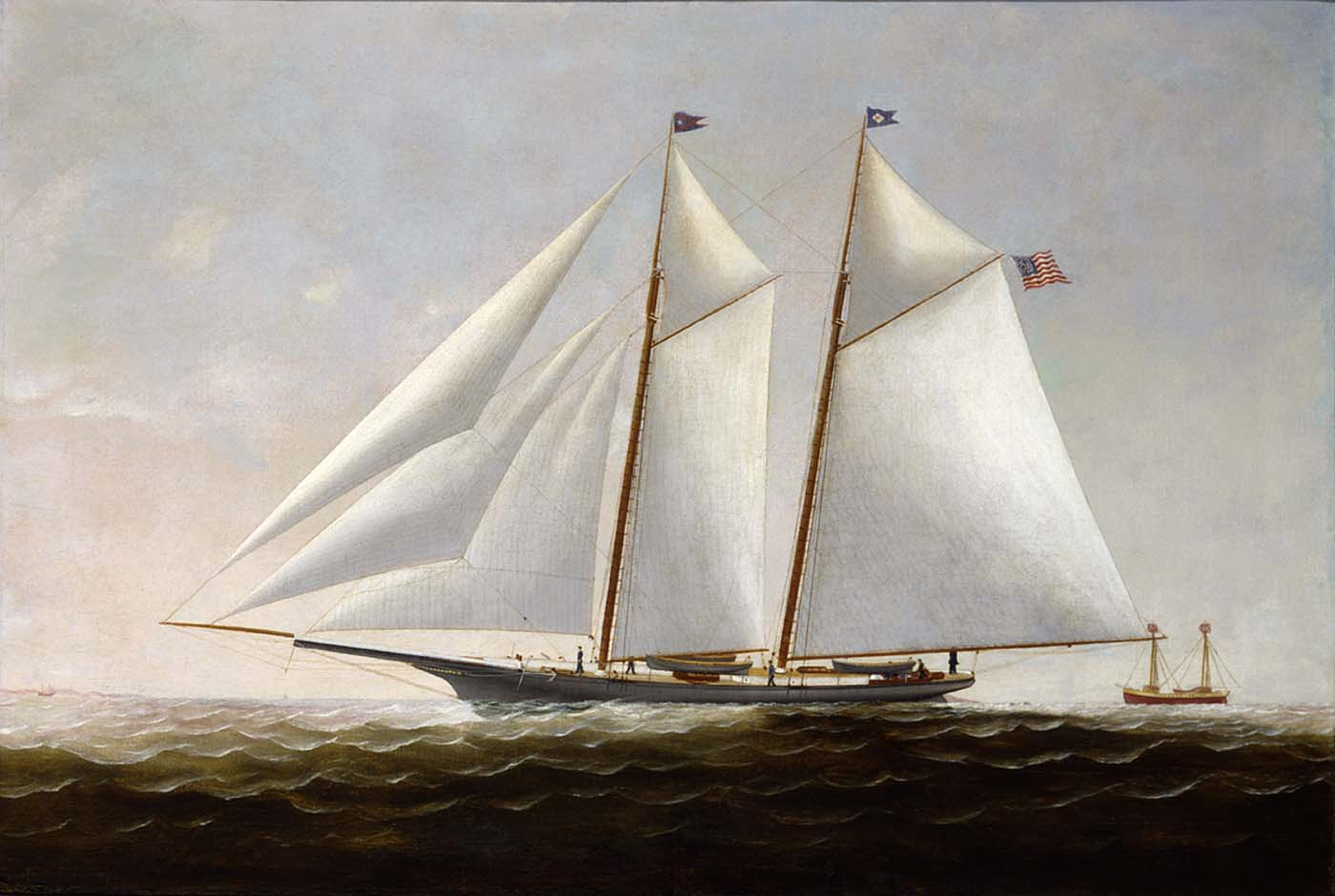
The Yacht America

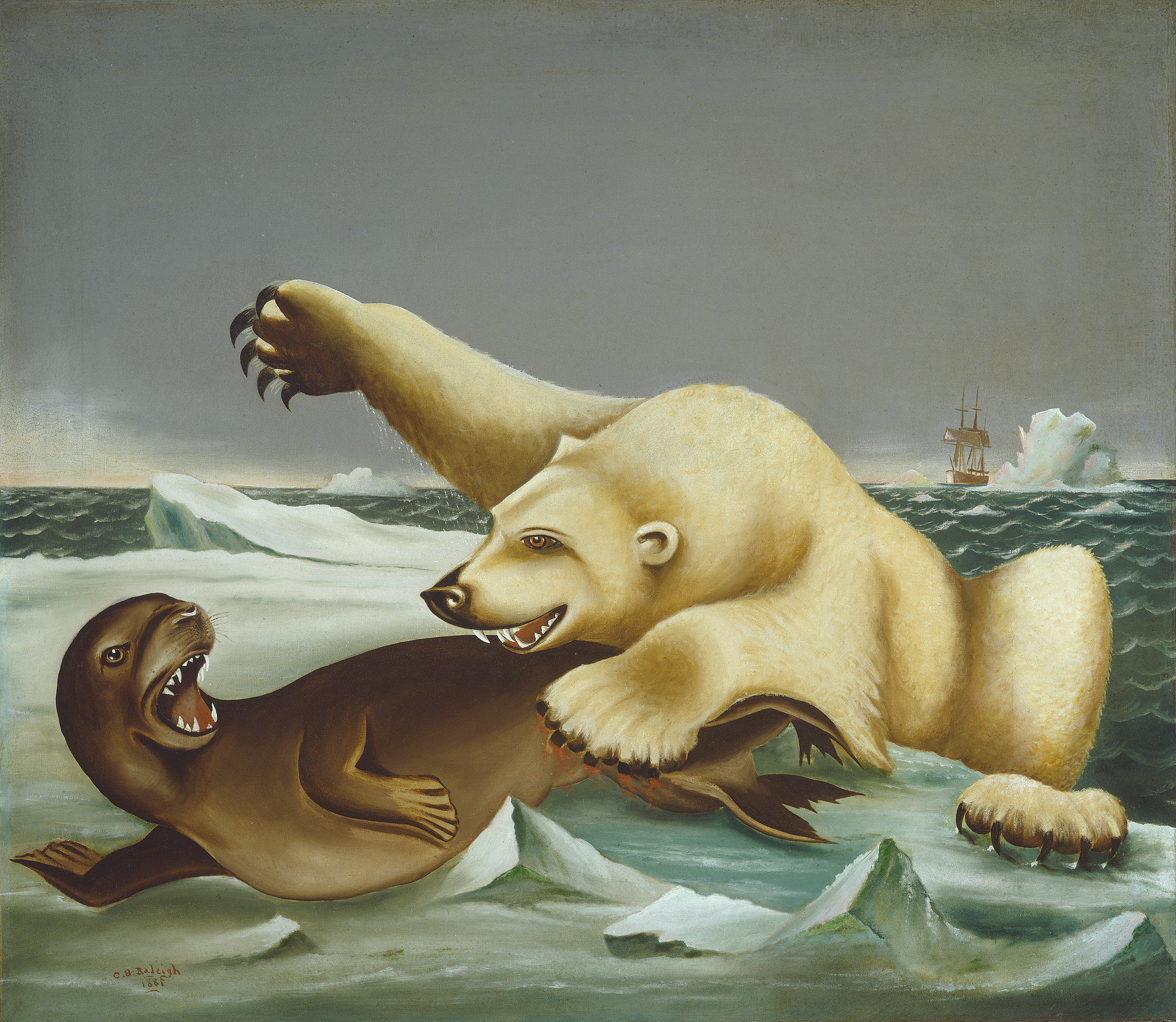
Law of the Wild

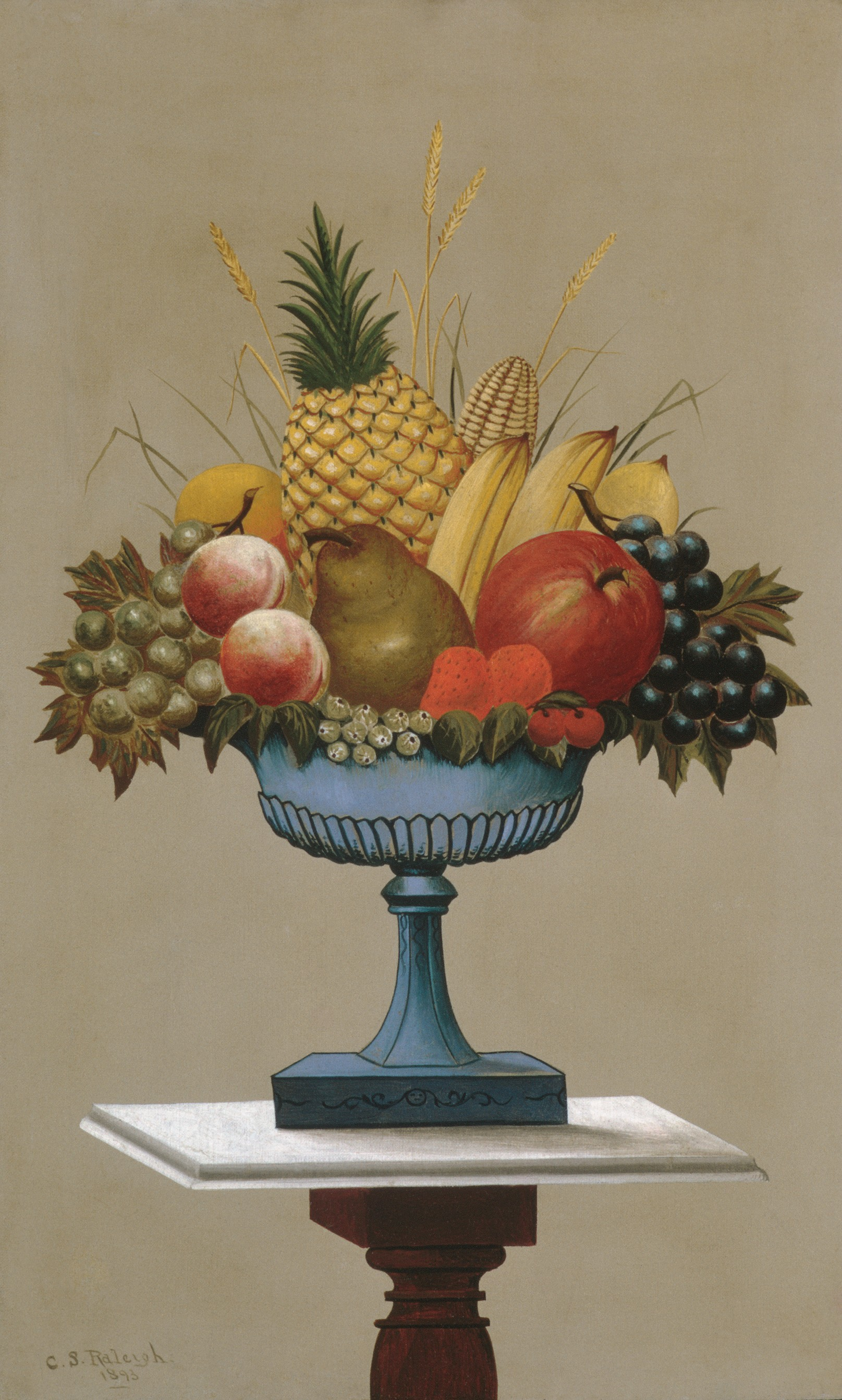
Fruit with Blue-footed Bowl
