= Charles Henry Wilton =

English musician (1761–1832)

Charles Henry Wilton (1761–1832) was an English violinist, singer, composer and teacher of violin and piano.

== Biography ==
Wilton was born in Gloucester (England) on 15 June 1761 and died on 15 August 1832 in Southport (Lancashire, England). A brief account of his life appears in recent editions of The New Grove Dictionary of Music and Musicians and there is also a brief mention in the Biographical Dictionary of Actors, Actresses, Musicians, Dancers, Managers and Other Stage Personnel in London, 1660–1800.

Gloucester is one home of the Three Choirs Festival and, as a young man, Wilton studied the violin under Felice Giardini, the leader of the festival orchestra. During the late 1770s their names appear together on handbills for chamber recitals in London, where Giardini was resident at that time. Wilton continued his studies in Italy and on his return in 1784 he succeeded Giardini as leader of the orchestra for the Three Choirs Festival. His place of residence is unknown but he was active in London at this time—he is recorded as the leader of the orchestra for a performance of the oratorio Judith at the Haymarket theatre, London, on 13 March 1785. At some stage he established his home in the north-west of England and for many years he was in demand as leader of orchestras in Liverpool, Manchester and York although he resided in Brentford for a period around 1805. Lysons claims that by 1812 he had given up the violin and had confined himself to teaching piano in the Liverpool area.

== Compositions ==
The British Library holds a number of scores including

Opus 1	Six Duetts, vn, va (London, c1780)
Opus 2	Six Duetts, 2 vn (London, 1794)
Opus 3	Six Solos, vn, bc (hpd) (Liverpool, 1789)
Opus 3d	Twelve Progressive Duetts, 2 vn (London, c1794)
Opus 5	A Set of Eighteen Lessons, pf/hpd (Liverpool, 1791)
Opus 6	Three Duetts with Scots Airs, 2 vn (London, 1795)
Opus 9	Six Sonatas, pf (London, ?1805)
--	A Set of Short & Familiar Pieces, org, 2 vols. (London, ?1805)
--	Sonatina in C
--	Coolun, Irish Air with Variations, pf/hpd (Liverpool, c1790)
--	100 Psalm & Hymn Tunes with Chants (London, 1827)

There are many other song settings.

== Recordings ==
Three of the six duets of Opus 2 have been recorded (as trios) with an additional bass continuo. They are coupled with a septet by Hummel on a disc available from Forgotten records.

A setting of Psalm 12 is included in a collection of psalm settings by the Choir of King's College Cambridge.

One of the Piano Sonatas is included (with incorrect dates) as the first piece in the series Classics to Moderns by Dénes Ágay. A free score is available. This popular piece has many YouTube recordings, some with interesting variations (Video on YouTube, Video on YouTube).
