= 1999 British Academy Television Awards =

UK television awards ceremony

- Date: 9 May 1999
- Site: Grosvenor House Hotel
- Hosted by: Michael Parkinson

Highlights
- Best Comedy Series: Father Ted
- Best Drama: The Cops
- Best Actor: Tom Courtenay; A Rather English Marriage
- Best Actress: Thora Hird; Waiting for the Telegram
- Best Comedy Performance: Dermot Morgan Father Ted

Television coverage
- Channel: BBC One
- Ratings: 8.84 million

The 1999 British Academy Television Awards were held on 9 May at the Grosvenor House Hotel in Park Lane, London. It was hosted solely by Michael Parkinson, who was due to share hosting duties with Jill Dando until her murder two weeks earlier.

== Winners and nominees ==
Winners are listed first and highlighted in boldface; the nominees are listed below.

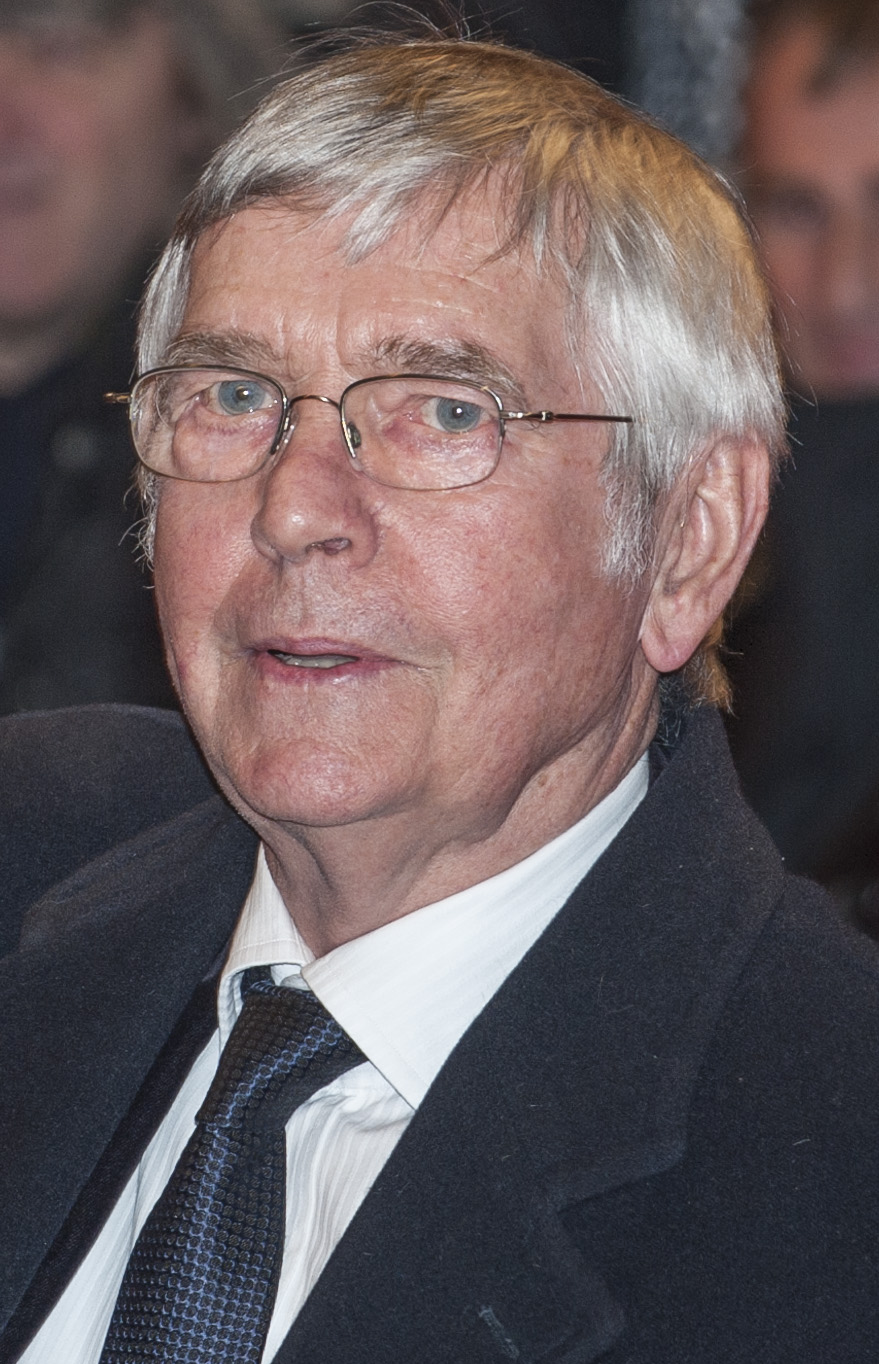
Best Actor award winner Tom Courtenay.

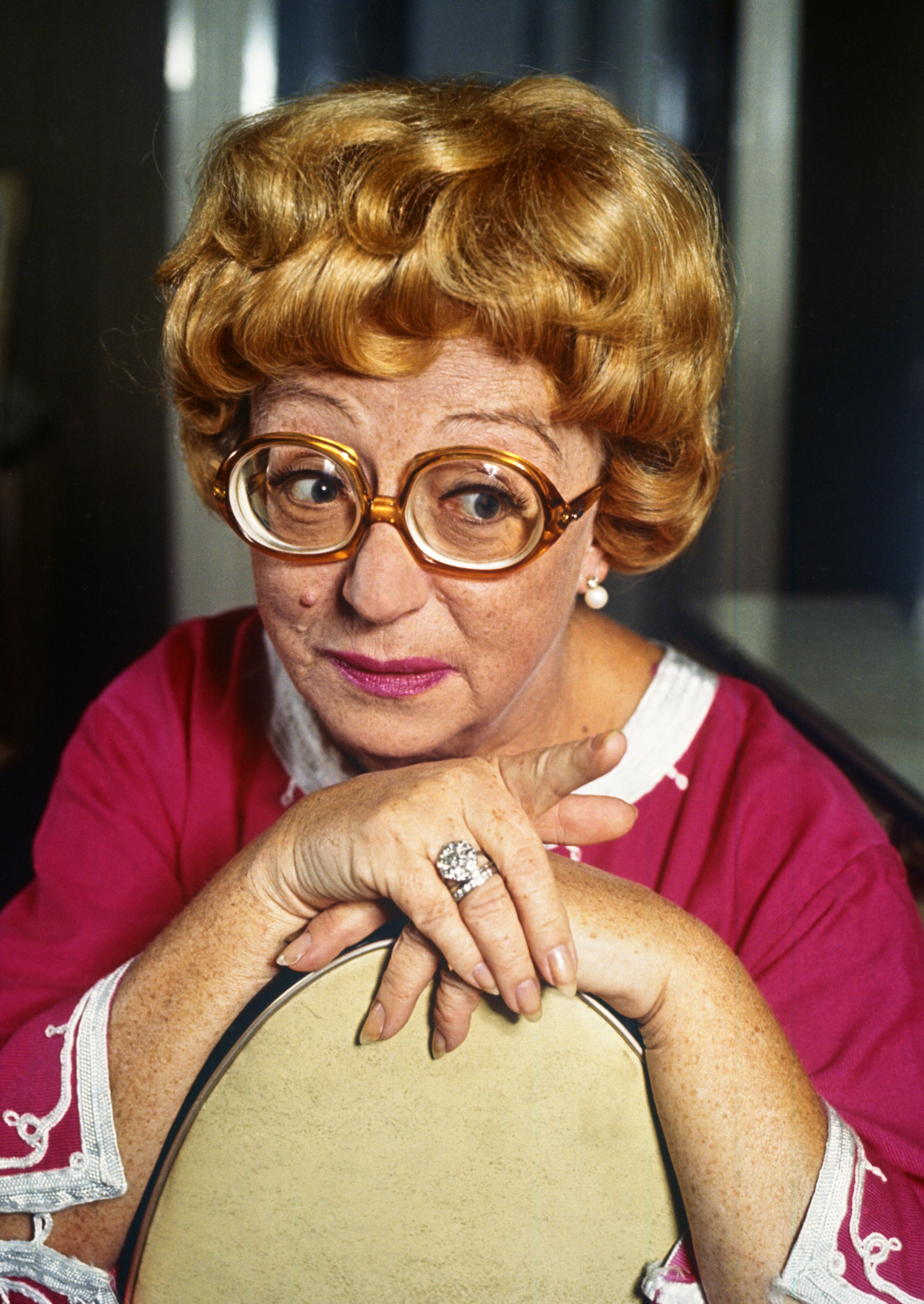
Best Actress winner Thora Hird.

Best Drama Series	Best Drama Serial
**The Cops (World Productions / BBC Two)**; Jonathan Creek (BBC / BBC One); Playing the Field (Tiger Aspect Productions / BBC One); Undercover Heart (BBC / BBC One)	**Our Mutual Friend (BBC / BBC One)**; Amongst Women (Parallel Film Productions Limited / BBC Two); A Respectable Trade (BBC / BBC One); Vanity Fair (BBC / A&E Network / BBC One)
Best Actor	Best Actress
**Tom Courtenay** — **A Rather English Marriage (BBC Two)**; Robert Carlyle — Looking After Jo Jo (BBC Two); Albert Finney — A Rather English Marriage (BBC Two); Timothy Spall — Our Mutual Friend (BBC Two)	**Thora Hird** — **Waiting for the Telegram (BBC Two)**; Francesca Annis — Reckless (ITV); Natasha Little — Vanity Fair (BBC One); Joanna Lumley — A Rather English Marriage (BBC Two)
Best Comedy (Programme or Series)	Best Comedy Performance
**Father Ted (Hat Trick Productions / Channel 4)**; Dinnerladies (Pozzitive TV / Good Fun / BBC One); The Royle Family (Granada Television / BBC One); The Vicar of Dibley (Tiger Aspect Productions / BBC One)	**Dermot Morgan** — **Father Ted (Channel 4)**; Caroline Aherne — The Royle Family (BBC One); Ardal O'Hanlon — Father Ted (Channel 4); Julie Walters — Dinnerladies (BBC One)
Best Single Drama	Best Factual Series
**A Rather English Marriage (Wall to wall television / BBC One)**; A Life For A Life – The True Story Of Stefan Kiszko (Picture Palace Productions / ITV); Playing Sandwiches (Slow Motion Limited / BBC Two); Waiting for the Telegram (Slow Motion Limited / BBC Two)	**The Human Body (BBC / BBC One)**; The Clintons - A Marriage of Power (Channel 4); Cold War (Jeremy Isaacs Television Limited / Channel 4); The Life of Birds (BBC / BBC One)
Best Feature	Best Soap Opera
**Back to the Floor (BBC / BBC Two)**; Changing Rooms (Bazal / BBC Two); House Doctor (TalkBack Productions / Channel 5); Time Team (Videotext Communications / Channel 4)	**EastEnders (BBC / BBC One)**; Brookside (Mersey Television / Channel 4); Coronation Street (Granada Television / ITV); Hollyoaks (Mersey Television / Channel 4)
Best Light Entertainment Performance	Best Light Entertainment Programme or Series
**Michael Parkinson** — **Parkinson (BBC One)**; John Bird and John Fortune — Rory Bremner - Who Else? (Channel 4); Kathy Burke — Harry Enfield's Yule Log Chums (BBC One); Billy Connolly — 30 Years of Billy Connolly (BBC One)	**Who Wants to Be a Millionaire? (Celador / ITV)**; Big Train (TalkBack Productions / BBC Two); Goodness Gracious Me (BBC / BBC Two); Rory Bremner - Who Else? (Kudos Film & Television / Channel 4)
Best News and Current Affairs Journalism	Best Live Outside Broadcast Coverage
**Dispatches: - Inside The Animal Liberation Front (Channel 4)**; Newsnight - Northern Ireland peace process (BBC / BBC Two); ETA: Coming In From The Cold (BBC / BBC Two); Omagh bombing (ITN / ITV)	**Derby Day (Channel 4)**; The Eurovision Song Contest (BBC One); Football World Cup Final Programme (BBC One); World Cup '98 – England v Argentina (ITV)
Flaherty Award for Single Documentary	Huw Wheldon Award for Arts Programme or Series
**After Lockerbie (BBC Two)**; 42 Up (Granada Television / BBC One); Mir Mortals; Tongue Tied	**Arena — The Brian Epstein Story (BBC / BBC Two)**; Arena – The Noël Coward Trilogy (BBC / BBC Two); The Secret Art of Government; Vile Bodies: Naked
Originality	Best International Programme or Series
**The Human Body (BBC One)**; Channel 5 News (Channel 5); The King of Chaos; Lemurs	**The Larry Sanders Show**; Ally McBeal; The Simpsons; The X-Files
The Lew Grade Award	The Dennis Potter Award
**Goodnight Mr Tom**	**David Renwick**; **Denise O'Donoghue**
The Alan Clarke Award	The Richard Dimbleby Award
**Jimmy Mulville**	**Trevor McDonald**

=== Craft Awards ===
Best Costume Design	Best Original Television Music
**A Respectable Trade** – **Frances Tempest**; Vanity Fair – Rosalind Ebbutt; Hornblower: The Even Chance – John Mollo; Our Mutual Friend – Mike O'Neill	**A Rather English Marriage** – **Jim Parker**; Vanity Fair – Murray Gold; Our Mutual Friend – Adrian Johnston; Hornblower: The Even Chance – John Keane
Best Design	Best Make-Up
**Our Mutual Friend** – **Malcolm Thornton**; Hornblower: The Even Chance – Andrew Mollo; Far from the Madding Crowd – Adrian Smith; Alice Through the Looking Glass – Anne Tilby	**Our Mutual Friend** – **Lisa Westcott**; Far from the Madding Crowd – Dorka Nieradzik; French and Saunders (Christmas Special) – Jan Sewell, Darren Phillips; Stars in Their Eyes – Glenda Wood
Best Photography - Factual	Best Photography and Lighting - Fiction
**42 Up** – **George Jesse Turner**; Arena — The Brian Epstein Story – Luke Cardiff; Born to Be Wild: Operation Lemur with John Cleese – Mike Eley, Warwick Sloss, Gavin Thurston; The Human Body – Chris Hartley, David Barlow, Tim Shepherd, Rob Franklin	**Far from the Madding Crowd** – **John Daly**; Vanity Fair – Oliver Curtis; Cold Feet – Peter Middleton; Our Mutual Friend – David Odd
Best Editing - Factual	Best Editing - Fiction/Entertainment
**Lockerbie: A Night Remembered** – **Brian Tagg**; Arena — The Brian Epstein Story – Roy Deverell, Guy Crossman; Arena — The Noël Coward Story – David Kitson; Bring Me Sunshine: The Heart And Soul Of Eric Morecambe (Omnibus) – Andrew Quigley	**A Rather English Marriage** – **Dave King**; Vanity Fair – Bill Diver; Hornblower: The Even Chance – Keith Palmer; Our Mutual Friend – Frances Parker
Best Sound - Factual	Best Sound - Fiction/Entertainment
**The Life of Birds** – **Team**; Omnibus: Andre Previn – Bob Blauvelt, Bill Chesneau, Steve Jankowski, Peter Davies; Lockerbie: A Night Remembered – David Lindsay, Matt Skilton; The Human Body – Team	**Our Mutual Friend** – **Paul Hamblin, Catherine Hodgson, Graham Headicar, Richard Manton**; A Rather English Marriage – Jim Greenhorn, Colin Martin, Richard Skelton; The Eurovision Song Contest – Barry Hawes, Tim Davies; Hornblower: The Even Chance – Christian Wangler, Colin Martin, Michael Crouch
Best Graphic Design
**The Human Body** – **Tim Goodchild, David Haith**; World Cup 98 – Steven Aspinall; Body Story – Chris Hart; Eurotrash – Tim Varlow

=== Special awards ===
- **Richard Curtis**

== In Memoriam ==
- Ernie Wise
- Robin Bailey
- Patricia Hayes
- Bryan Mosley
- Ken Platt
- Betty Marsden
- Andrew Gardner
- Richard Dunn
- Johnny Morris
- John Hanson
- Rod Hull
- Sid Green
- Trevor Philpott
- Mary Millar
- Frank Gillard
- Robin Ray
- Johnny Speight
- Robin Nedwell
- Derek Nimmo
- Bob Peck
- Michael Samuelson
- Lew Grade
- Jill Dando
