= Rory McGrath =

English comedian (born 1956)

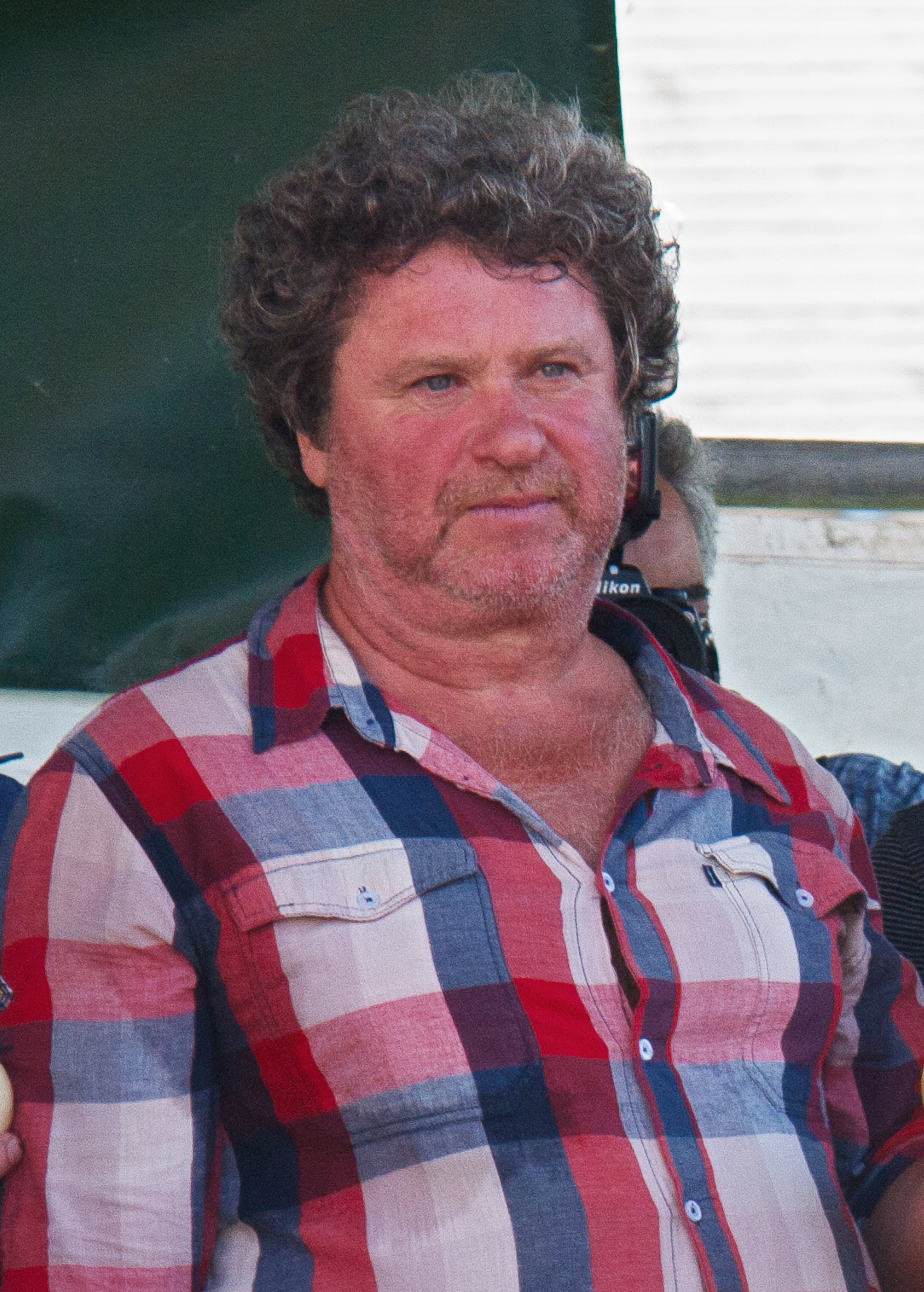
- McGrath in 2012
- Born: Patrick Rory McGrath; 17 March 1956 (age 70); Redruth, Cornwall, England
- Education: Emmanuel College, Cambridge (BA)
- Occupations: Comedian; writer
- Years active: 1979–present

Patrick Rory McGrath (born 17 March 1956) is a British comedian, television personality, and writer. He came to prominence in the comedy show Who Dares Wins and was a regular panellist on the game show They Think It's All Over. He acted in the sitcom Chelmsford 123 and appeared in the ITV reality show Sugar Free Farm.

== Early life ==
McGrath was born in Redruth, Cornwall, England. He studied at Redruth Grammar School and Emmanuel College, Cambridge, from which he received a lower second class degree in modern languages.

== Career ==
McGrath became a member of the Footlights while at Cambridge and met Jimmy Mulville, with whom he wrote and performed. After university, they wrote BBC radio scripts for Frankie Howerd and Windsor Davies. McGrath also co-wrote Black Cinderella Two Goes East with Clive Anderson for BBC Radio 2 in 1978. McGrath and Mulville went on to write for shows such as Not the Nine O'Clock News and Alas Smith and Jones, and they were part of the team of writer/performers behind BBC Radio 4's Injury Time (1980–1982), and the Channel 4 comedy sketch series Who Dares Wins. In 1981 McGrath wrote and performed in the radio show Glompus Van De Hloed's Tales From The Crypt, alongside Andrew Sachs, Chrissy Roberts, Griff Rhys Jones and Mel Smith, from which an album was produced.

In 1986, McGrath, with Jimmy Mulville and Denise O'Donoghue, co-founded the independent British TV production company Hat Trick Productions. An early production was Chelmsford 123 (1988 and 1990), which McGrath and Mulville wrote and performed. In 1990, he hosted the game show Trivial Pursuit on BBC One, but in 1992 he was dismissed from Hat Trick. The confrontation came days after McGrath had left his wife and two young children. He was a panel member on the BBC comedy sports quiz They Think It's All Over (1995–2006). He was presenter of the series Rory's Commercial Breakdown (1997), where humorous adverts were shown from different countries. He has made two football DVDs, Own Goals and Gaffs – The Premiership in 2002 and More Own Goals and Gaffs in 2003. McGrath also appeared in an episode of the Sooty Show (Time Capsule), as a scuba diver who appeared from anywhere to stop Matthew Corbett and Sooty from burying their time capsule.

From 2006 to 2011, McGrath starred in the BBC's Three Men in a Boat series, alongside Dara Ó Briain and Griff Rhys Jones. The series has included the trio rowing up the River Thames (similar to the eponymous 1889 novel Three Men in a Boat by Jerome K. Jerome), sailing from London to the Isle of Wight for a sailing yacht race, borrowing numerous vessels to make their way from Plymouth to the Isles of Scilly, taking to the Irish canals and rivers along with Ó Briain's dog (Snip Nua), travelling in the Mediterranean to Venice and attempting to find a boat to take to the anniversary of the Statue of Liberty, where in response to a challenge between Ó Briain and Rhys Jones (who had each secured a boat and refused to give it up to use the other's), he secured permission to use the Nantucket Lightship. He also hosted Industrial Revelations: Best of British Engineering, series 5, first broadcast in 2008.

His first book, Bearded Tit – Confessions of a Birdwatcher, was published by Ebury Press on 1 May 2008 and was serialised by BBC Radio 4.

First airing in August 2008, McGrath co-starred in a four-part television series with British comedian Paddy McGuinness, broadcast on Channel 5, Rory and Paddy's Great British Adventure. In the series McGuinness and McGrath embarked on a nationwide road-trip, "on a mission to explore Britain's sporting heritage by probing the hidden life of its towns and villages". The series documented numerous arcane sports, such as cheese rolling, toe wrestling and swamp soccer. In 2011, McGrath presented Pub Dig for History. He presented two series of The Lakes for ITV and, in 2016, he took part in ITV's Sugar Free Farm which saw him go sugar-free for two weeks.

== Personal life ==
McGrath's partner is called Nicola. They met at Cambridge, but married other people. After both their marriages ended, she contacted him and they restarted their relationship in 1995.

McGrath supports Arsenal, Celtic and Plymouth Argyle. He and Peter Cook (a Tottenham supporter) used to have a friendly rivalry over their respective clubs. On the night that Cook died in January 1995, Tottenham had beaten Arsenal. McGrath found out about his friend's death after failing to receive Cook's usual abusive phonecall the next morning. McGrath is a friend and fan of Ralph McTell. He contributed sleeve notes to Affairs of the Heart, a McTell compilation album.

=== Criminal record ===
In May 2013, McGrath assaulted two people whilst intoxicated, leaving one person with a bloody nose and scratches. He received a caution.

In January 2017, McGrath was sentenced to 10 weeks in jail, suspended for 18 months, for harassing a former lover.

== Publications ==
- McGrath, Rory (2008). Bearded Tit. London: Ebury Press. ISBN 978-0-09-192269-6. (story of the author's life among birds)
- McGrath, Rory (2011). The Father, the Son and the Ghostly Hole: Confessions from a Guilt-edged Life. London: Ebury Press. ISBN 978-0-09-192461-4. (A memoir of a lapsed Catholic who can't quite fully escape)
