= Who Dares Wins (TV series) =

British comedy sketch show (1983–88)

- Genre: Sketch comedy
- Starring: Jimmy Mulville; Rory McGrath; Philip Pope; Julia Hills; Tony Robinson
- Country of origin: United Kingdom
- Original language: English
- No. of series: 4
- No. of episodes: 31

Production
- Producers: Andy Hamilton; Denise O'Donoghue
- Production location: Limehouse Studios
- Running time: 60 mins / 45 mins
- Production companies: Holmes Associates; Who Dares Wins Productions

Original release
- Network: Channel 4
- Release: 4 November 1983 – 25 May 1988

Who Dares Wins is a British television comedy sketch show, an adaptation of BBC Radio 4's Injury Time, broadcast between 1983 and 1988, featuring Jimmy Mulville, Rory McGrath, Philip Pope, Julia Hills and Tony Robinson. It was broadcast by Channel 4 late at night (the opening title sequence shows a man staggering home from the pub to get to the television in time for the programme). It was eventually aired by the Playboy Channel in cable television outlets in the United States.

The show's title is also the motto of the British Special Air Service regiment (see Who Dares Wins), whose badge, parodied to depict a flying pig, featured in the title sequence, and was often supplemented by a subtitle, e.g., "a week in Benidorm" or "Frank Bough’s Cardigan".

The broadcast pilot featured Brenda Blethyn and American actor William Hootkins in the cast. Neither returned for the series, with Blethyn replaced with Julia Hills.

Four series were broadcast between Mays 1984 and 1988, the first three of eight episodes, and the last of six. Although the second and third series' final episodes were broadcast in the last week of Advent, there were no separate Christmas episodes.

Mulville, McGrath and Pope had all contributed material to Not the Nine O'Clock News. Other script material was provided by Not the Nine O'Clock News regulars Colin Bostock-Smith and Andy Hamilton as well as alternative comedy writer Tony Sarchet. The show was recorded at the former independent production facility Limehouse Studios, on a soundstage in front of a live audience.

The programme sometimes satirised current events but the mainstay was simple observational comedy and frequently employed base humour (for example, the tracking camera shot in the title sequence showed a drunk who had urinated in his trousers).

The show pioneered a sketch style involving a roaming camera - the camera would move from character to character as they delivered their lines.

Notable sketches included:

- "The Pandas" - a recurring sketch with two male giant pandas (Terry and Wang-Wang) in a zoo, discussing life and bamboo shoots. The animals were portrayed with the stereotype mannerisms, attitudes - and strong language - of contemporary young, working-class men;
- Philip Pope singing a Barry Manilow-style song, initially praising a lost love, but realising how horrible she was and changing his lyrics accordingly;
- Tony Robinson appearing in a sketch possibly inspired by The Emperor's New Clothes, as a man being sold "going naked" by a pair of tailors. The sketch involved Robinson actually appearing on stage totally naked... and then hanging around in later sketches, still naked, seemingly not knowing what to do with himself;
- A parody of Channel 4's "red triangle". ( These were programmes with content regarded as "more explicit" than that normally shown on British TV, and were often foreign-language films. ) The parody showed clips from a supposed Eskimo pornographic film featuring "explicit nose rubbing" and "nose masturbation";
- A guest appearance by comedian Frankie Howerd playing a man who has never been on stage or TV, but just happens to look exactly like... Frankie Howerd ( "The resemblance is uncanny, isn't it ?" );
- A controversial sketch that parodied contemporary airline adverts by explicitly stating the air-hostesses were sexually available. Unfortunately, the name chosen for the fictional airline turned out to be the name of a real, lesser-known airline;
- A sketch before the opening credits, filmed in the style of a soft-core pornographic film, featuring a young couple simulating sexual intercourse... which turns out to be a "language course" - they are conjugating the French verb venir (to come);

Earlier series of the show were produced by Holmes Associates for Channel 4 Television, and later ones by Who Dares Wins Productions, with Mulville and McGrath going on to create Chelmsford 123.
