= Rory and Paddy's Great British Adventure =

- Title screen from Series 1
- Also known as: Rory and Paddy's Even Greater British Adventure
- Directed by: Marc Heffernan; Jamie Goold
- Presented by: Rory McGrath; Paddy McGuinness
- Country of origin: United Kingdom
- No. of series: 2
- No. of episodes: 10

Production
- Producers: Marc Heffernan; Jamie Goold
- Production company: IWC Media

Original release
- Network: Five
- Release: 13 August 2008 – 10 October 2010

Rory and Paddy's Great British Adventure is a television documentary series presented by comedians Rory McGrath and Paddy McGuinness. The series was broadcast on Five between 13 August and 3 September 2008. The series follows McGrath and McGuinness travelling around Great Britain, taking part in "strange but quintessentially British sporting events". Examples of sports that appeared in the series include cheese rolling, pie eating, bog snorkelling, Eton Fives and Egg Throwing. A second series, Rory and Paddy's Even Greater British Adventure, began on 20 September 2010 and ended on 18 October 2010.

== Plot ==
Rory and Paddy's Great British Adventure saw McGrath and McGuinness competing against both the public and themselves in unusual sports around Britain. For the first series, the contest was split into four parts: Middle England; Scotland and Northern England; Wales and the Shires; and Southern England. In each edition, McGrath and McGuinness go head-to-head at different sports, and also take part in a separate sport each. The results were recorded in their "Black book", with McGrath and McGuinness fighting each other to see who is best.

In the second series, the contest was split into six parts, with results recording their "Red book". The separate sports were removed from the show, so now each contest is a head-to-head between McGrath and McGuinness.

== Reception ==
The series received mixed reviews. The programme was originally broadcast during the 2008 Summer Olympics, which resulted in some media outlets saying that Britain should play in sports depicted in the show, rather than actual Olympic events. Andrew Tong wrote in The Independent on Sunday that; "we mustn't play them at their own game. Rather we should regale them with all the sports we invented but which the IOC won't allow in the Olympics. Not cricket and rugby, but games at which we're the best in the world, such as toe wrestling, mountain bike bog snorkelling, egg throwing and, of course, worm charming."

Noam Friedlander in Metro gave the programme four stars out of five, saying: "The pair packed a lot into the hour but a swifter romp through Middle England would have been more welcome. At least the eccentricities that make Britain 'great' got their minutes of fame. It makes a change to give these genuine characters airtime rather than the caterwauling wannabes we'll be seeing on this weekend's The X Factor auditions."

However, James Walton in the Daily Telegraph was more critical of Rory and Paddy's Great British Adventure saying, "that a sense of almost existential pointlessness had soon settled over the entire programme – a sense not banished by perhaps the least alluring pre-advert announcement in TV history. "Coming up," said Paddy, 'Rory's a no-hoper at tiddlywinks.'"

== Episodes ==
=== Series 1: Rory and Paddy's Great British Adventure ===
Episode	Air date	Sports	Winner
1 – Middle England	13 August 2008	Cheese rolling; Dwile flonking; Snail racing; River football (Paddy's solo sport); Tiddlywinks (Rory's solo sport); Tetbury Woolsack Races; Shin kicking; Overall winner	Paddy; Rory; Paddy; None declared; None declared; Paddy; Paddy; Paddy
2 – Scotland and Northern England	20 August 2008	Axe throwing; Bed racing (Rory's solo sport); Red Hose Race (Paddy's solo sport); Pie eating; Swamp soccer; Stone skimming; Caber tossing; Overall winner	Rory; None declared; None declared; Rory; On the same side; Paddy; Paddy; Draw declared
3 – Wales and the Shires	27 August 2008	Toe wrestling; Vintage cycling (Rory's solo sport); Bog snorkelling (Paddy's solo sport); Egg throwing; Worm charming; Caravan demolition derby; Overall winner	Paddy; Winner; Loser; Paddy; Rory; Draw; Draw declared
4 – Southern England	3 September 2008	Pedal Car Racing; Eton Fives; Stinging nettle eating (Rory's solo sport); Bat and trap (Paddy's solo sport); Cornish wrestling; Gig racing; Overall winner	Rory; Paddy; Loser; Winner; Rory; Paddy; Paddy (Episode and series)

=== Series 2: Rory and Paddy's Even Greater British Adventure ===
Episode	Air date	Sports	Winner
1 – Scotland	20 September 2010	Glen Nevis River Race; Haggis hurling; Free Fencing; Broadsword Fighting; Dog sleding; Overall winner	Paddy (Note: While the race technically ended in a draw; due to Rory failing to finish and Paddy opting out of the thirty-foot jump near the end of the course, Rory decided to give Paddy his "half-point" at the end of the episode, effectively giving Paddy a 5–0 win for the Scottish leg of the series.); Paddy; Paddy; Paddy; Paddy; Paddy
2 – Wales	27 September 2010	Trotting; Sheepdog trial; Clog Dancing; Coracle Racing; Longbow; Overall winner	Rory; Paddy; Rory; Paddy; Paddy; Paddy
3 – The North	4 October 2010	Chainsaw Sculpting; Black Pudding Throwing (Paddy's solo event); Crown Green Bowls (Rory's solo event); Dry Stone Walling; Civil War Re-enactment; Overall winner	Paddy; Victory (Note: Despite Paddy only hitting a cameraman, the duo agreed to settle for obtaining a point each, because Paddy didn't believe that southerner Rory had gone to Bolton.); Victory; Rory; Paddy; Paddy
4 – The South	11 October 2010	Punting; Hastings Old Town Pram Race; Bramble Bank Cricket (Rory's solo sport); Glass Blowing (Paddy's solo sport); Street luge; Overall winner	Caroline & Rory (Note: While Rory was on the winning punt, Rory employed the vastly superior expertise of the woman who trained him – Caroline – and had her pilot the punt in his stead, resulting in an easy victory, despite Paddy trying to even the odds by pulling his punt along the river by grabbing the bank.); Rory; Draw; Draw; Paddy; Rory
5 – The Shires	18 October 2010	Tree Climbing; Sheep Shearing; Hen Racing; Farriery; Lawnmower Racing; Overall winner	Rory; Paddy; Rory; Rory; Rory; Rory (Note: "Dark forces were at work!" – Paddy McGuinness, commenting on the so-called dubious ways (see also: excuses) in which Rory was declared victorious; befriending the farrier before the competition, having his tree climbing ropes arranged into a pulley to aid his ascent, Paddy's lawnmower being rendered out of action half a lap before victory with a broken chain, etc.)
6 – The South West	25 October 2010		
