= Chris Anderson =

Chris Anderson may refer to:

== Sports ==
- Chris Anderson (baseball) (born 1992), American baseball player
- Chris Anderson (cheese roller), 23-time winner of annual cheese rolling
- Chris Anderson (footballer, born 1925) (1925–1986), Scottish footballer
- Chris Anderson (footballer, born 1990), English footballer
- Chris Anderson (golfer, born 1961) (1961–2023), American professional golfer
- Chris Anderson (golfer, born 1970), American professional golfer
- Chris Anderson (high jumper) (born 1968), Australian high jumper
- Chris Anderson (rugby) (born 1952), Australian rugby league player and coach, rugby union coach

== Music ==
- Chris Anderson (trumpeter), American trumpet player, with Southside Johnny and the Asbury Jukes
- Chris Anderson (pianist) (1926–2008), American jazz pianist

== Other ==
- Chris Anderson (entrepreneur) (born 1957), Pakistan-born British publisher, entrepreneur and head of TED
- Chris Anderson (writer) (born 1961), American business writer, former editor-in-chief of Wired Magazine, popularized "The Long Tail"
- Chris Anderson (politician), American politician and Democratic Party political activist

== See also ==
- Chris Andersen (born 1978), American retired basketball player
- Christopher Anderson (disambiguation)
- Christopher Andersen (born 1949), American journalist and author
