= Owl Art Studio =

Coordinates: 51.5501°N 0.2210°W

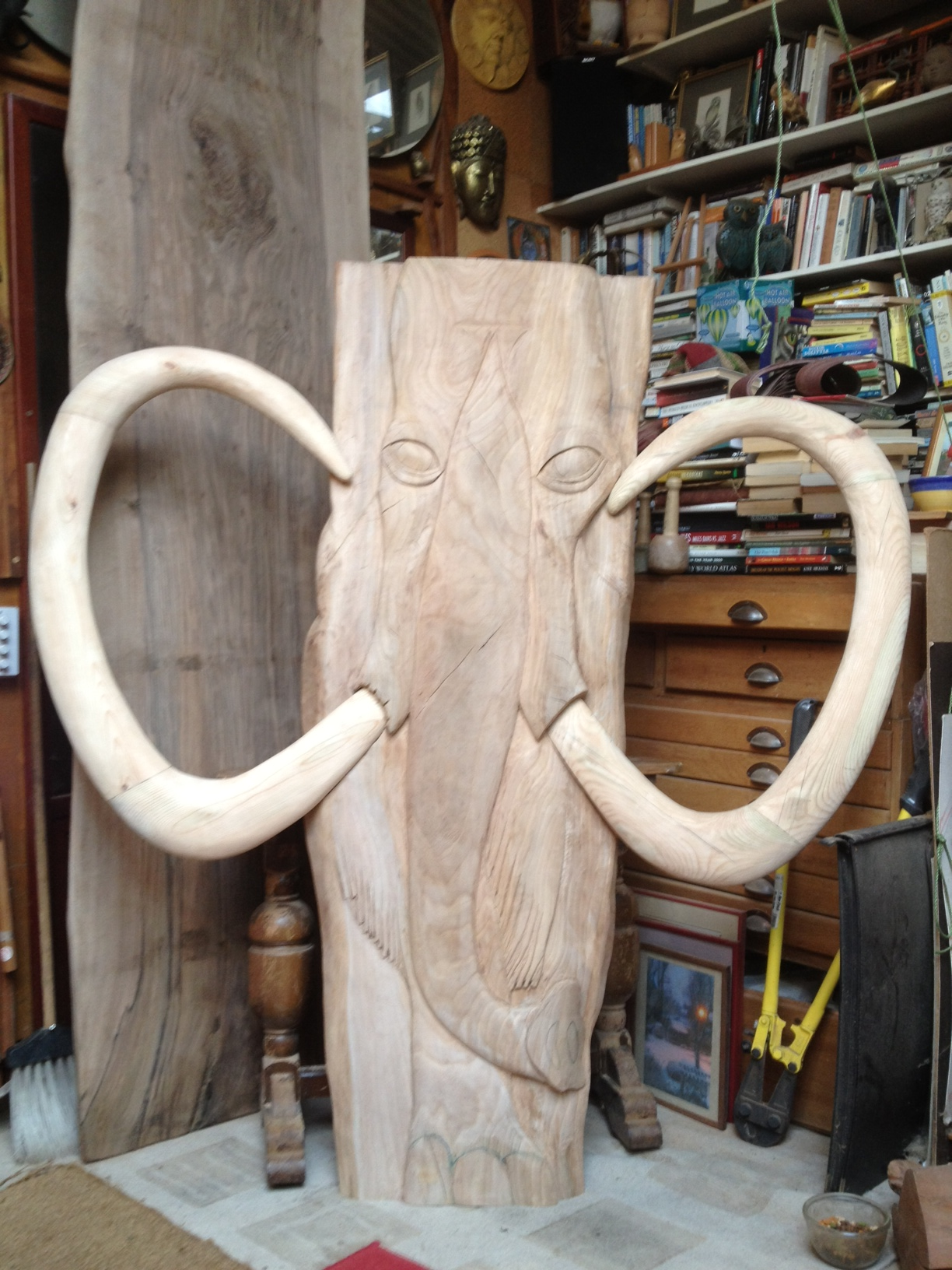
mammoth (work in progress) by robin tatham, owl art studio 2013

Owl Art Studio (motto: "it seemed like a good idea at the time") is an art studio based in Willesden Green, London, NW2 England. The artistic director is Robin Tatham. The studio is involved in printmaking, wood carving, and public artworks including large-scale sculpture and public space gardening projects.

The public space artwork projects are influenced by the work of Andy Goldsworthy, Richard Long, and Christo and Jeanne-Claude.

The studio has been the subject of the documentary, The Owls Inside by film-maker Steven Rose.

== Projects ==
- A sequence of large-scale woodcarvings from dead trees in the public park local to owl art studio, executed from 2000-2005.
- The treatment of a small London street as a coherent art work within itself, involving the refurbishment of the neglected gardens and public space, based on a recycling ethos.
- Various carving commissions.

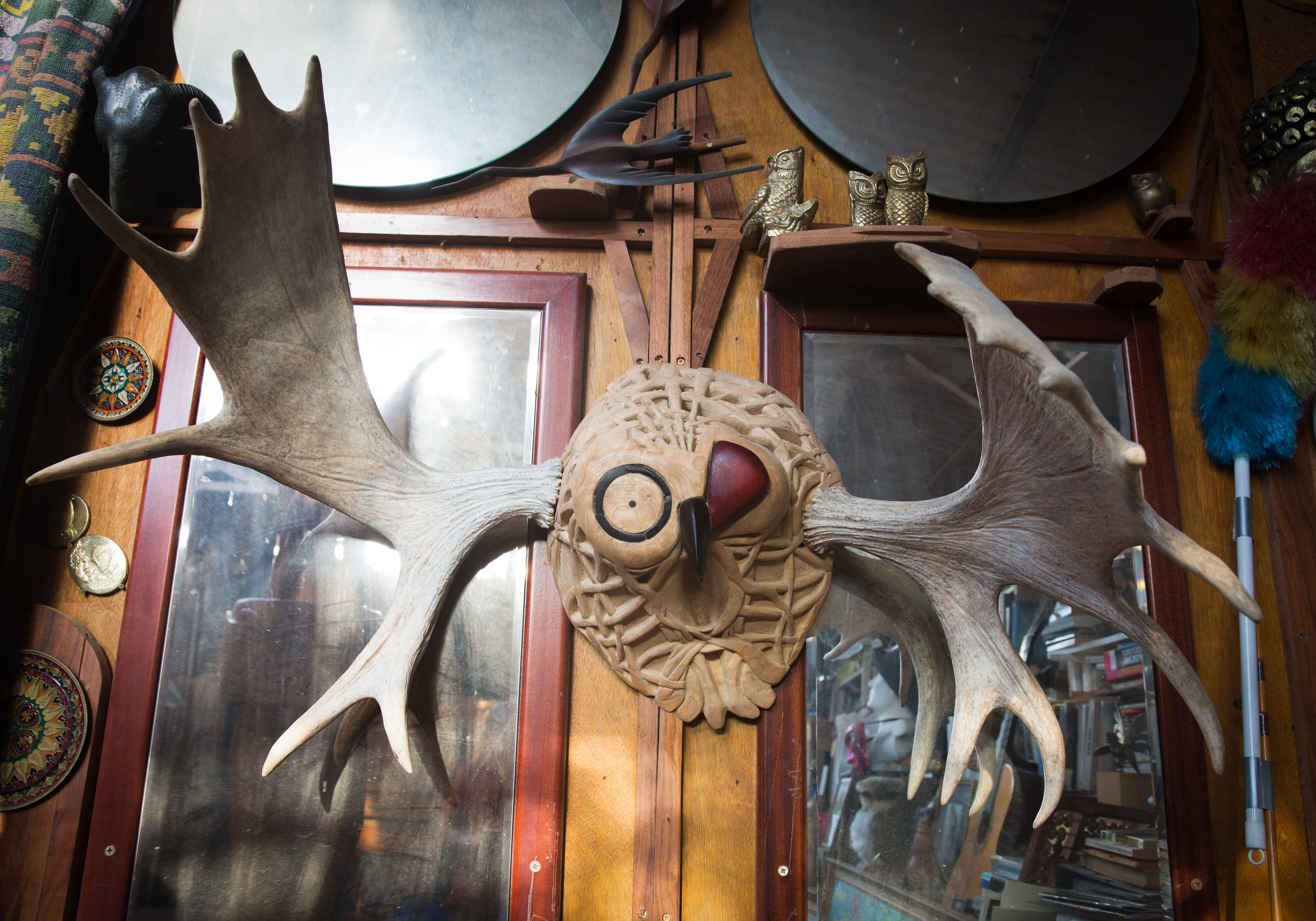
moose-winged owl carving, robin tatham, owl art studio 2012

== Awards ==
- 2000, Millennium Award for Community-based Artwork

== Patrons ==
Patrons include:

- Bill Nighy
- Russell Brand
- Jimmy Mulville
- Alan Fox
- Philip Barry
