= Chris Anderson (cheese roller) =

English provincial race champion

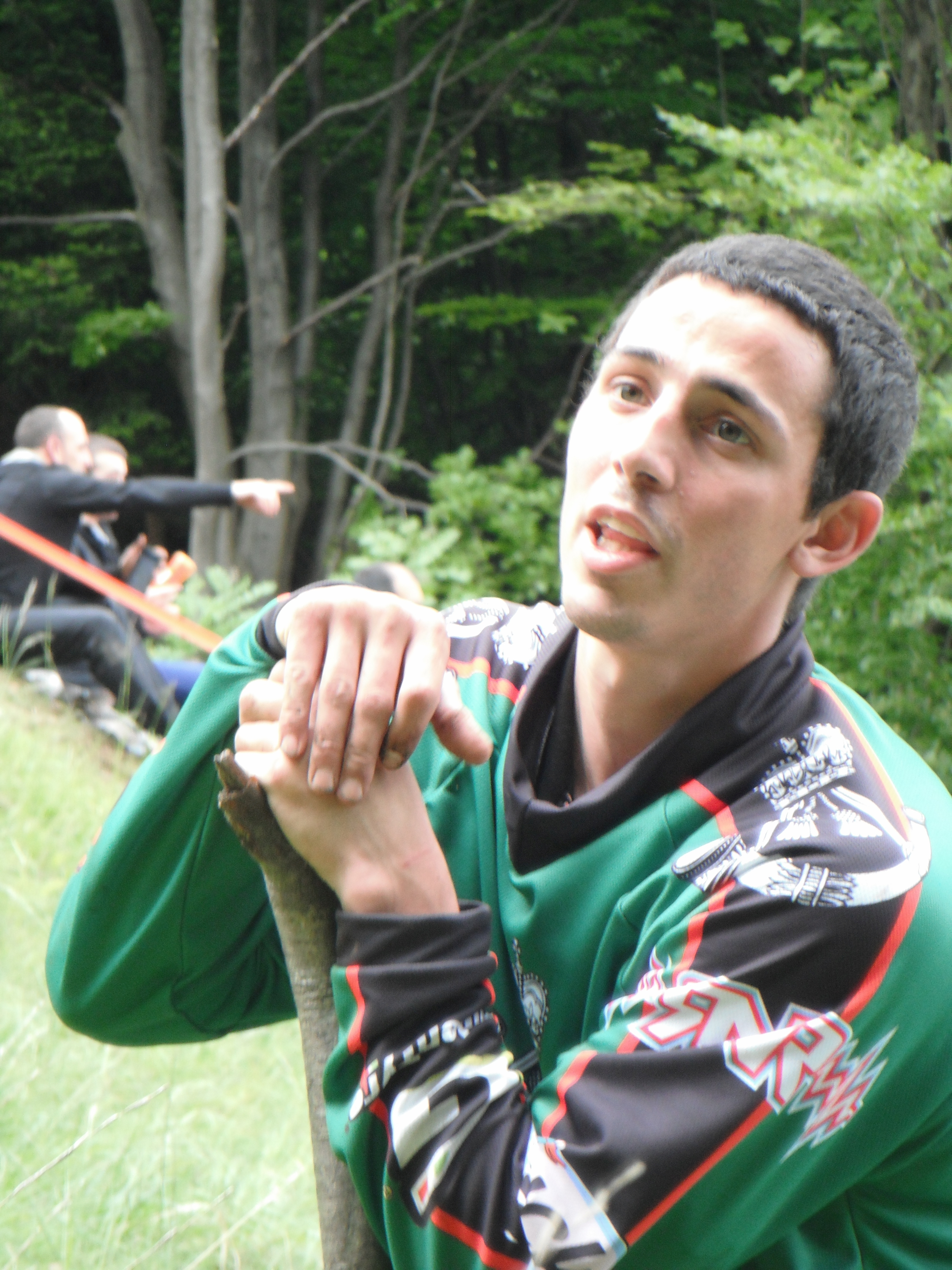
- Born: United Kingdom
- Occupations: Light infantryman, Cheese roller

Christopher Anderson is a groundworker and a British Army veteran, best known for winning the annual cheese rolling at Cooper's Hill in Gloucestershire a record 23 times. He now spends his spare time training with Severn AC running club and entering local races.

== Biography ==
Chris Anderson is a former light infantryman in the 1st Battalion, The Rifles of the British Army. He comes from Brockworth, the village in Gloucestershire at the foot of Cooper's Hill, venue for the Cooper's Hill Cheese-Rolling and Wake.

Anderson first competed in the annual cheese rolling in 2004 at the age of 17 and came second. He won his first race in 2005 and beat the record, held by Stephen Gyde, in 2018. In his 14 years of competition he has suffered a broken ankle, concussion, a torn calf muscle and bruised kidneys.

Despite taking home 23 Double Gloucester cheeses, he only likes cheddar. After winning three races in 2017, he auctioned one of his three cheeses for a charity in aid of the condition nonketotic hyperglycinemia (NKH).

Anderson believes that the secret to winning the cheese rolling is to stay on your feet and not fall over. However, footage of him winning the cheese rolling for a record 21st time reveals that he does in fact fall over, but has a particular talent for getting up swiftly, propelling himself down the hill in a single seamless movement while fallers behind roll multiple times before coming to a stop. Anderson has since announced his retirement from running the hill but continues to run on and off road for Gloucester's Severn AC.

== Cheese rolling record ==
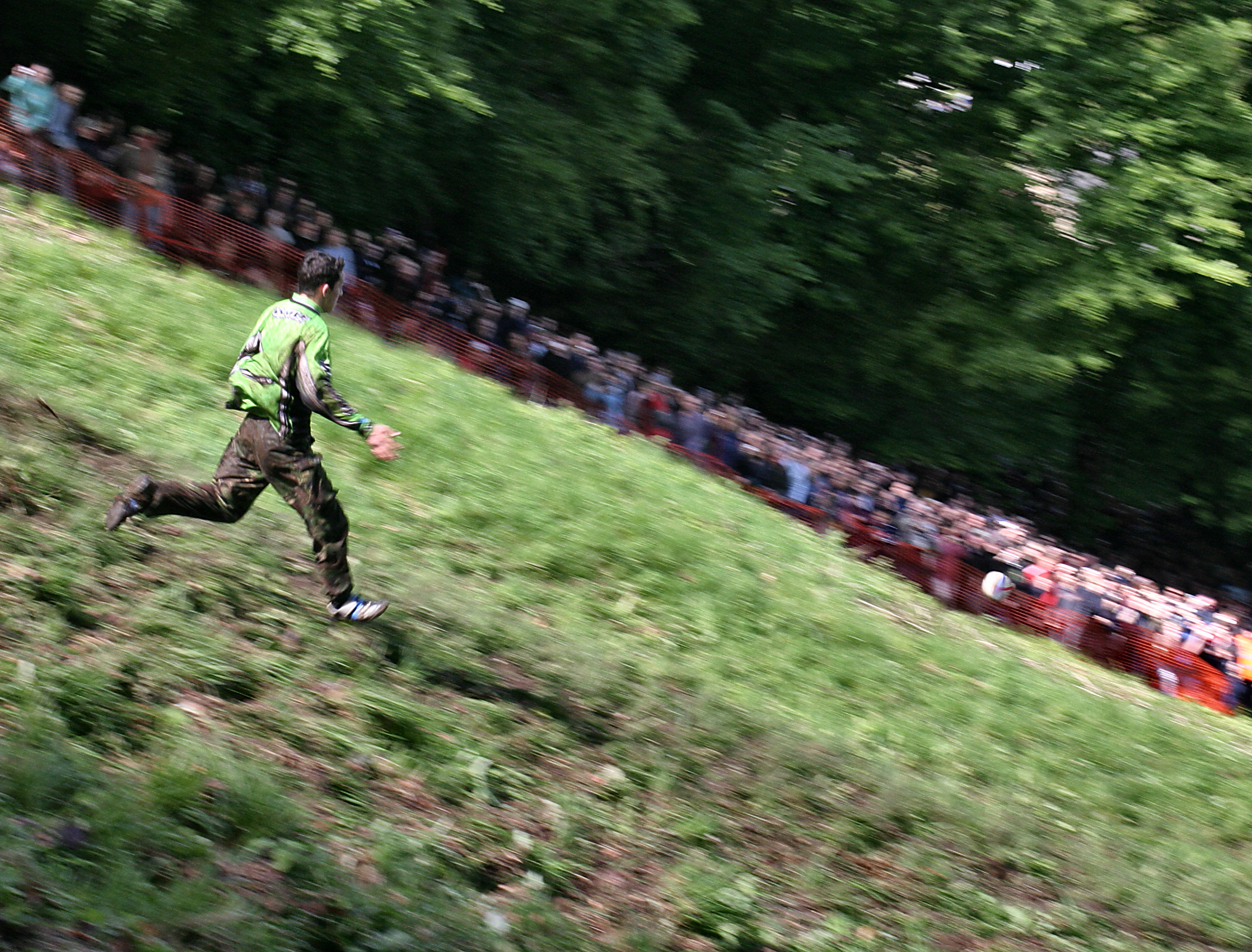
Chris Anderson leading the 3rd men's downhill race in 2006 on his way to his second victory

- 2005 1 win.
- 2006 1 win.
- 2007 1 win.
- 2008 1 win.
- 2009 2 wins.
- 2010 2 wins.
- 2011 3 wins.
- 2012 2 wins.
- 2015 2 wins.
- 2016 2 wins.
- 2017 3 wins.
- 2018 2 wins.
- 2022 1 win.
