= Cooper's Hill Cheese-Rolling and Wake =

Annual event held in Gloucestershire, England

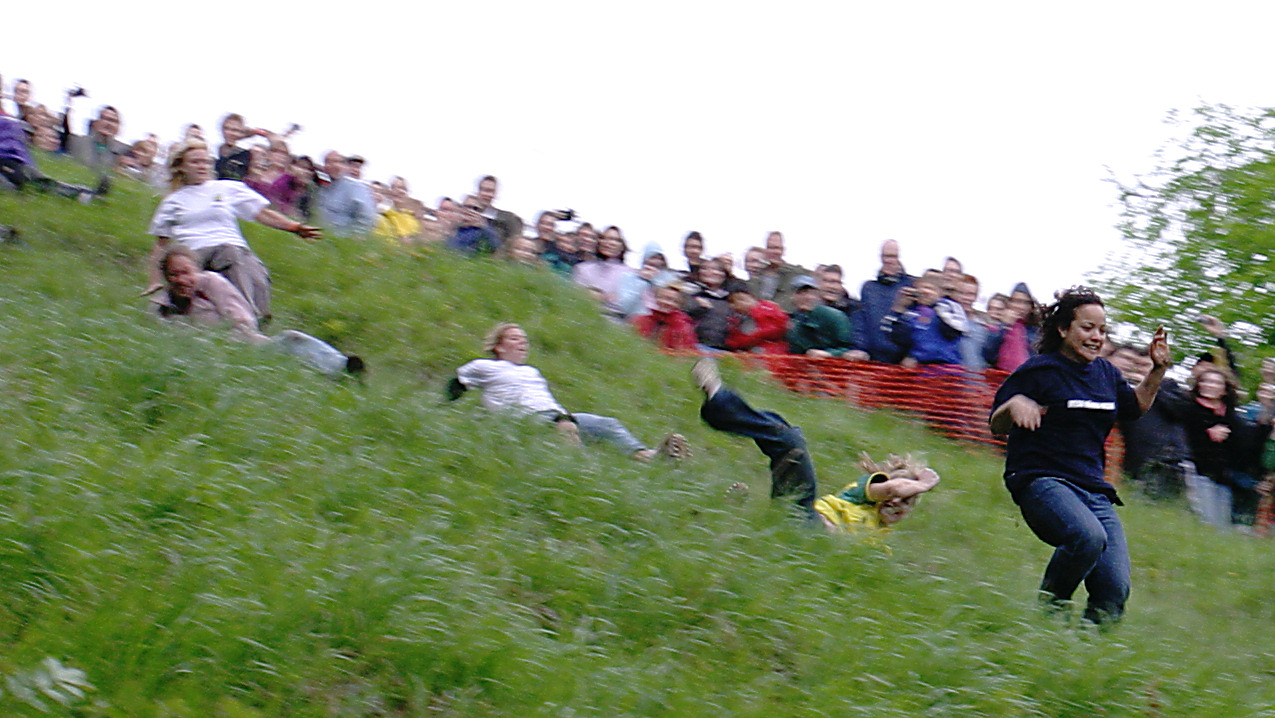
- Dionne Carter (NZ) leading Ladies downhill race 2006
- Status: Active
- Frequency: Annually
- Location: Cooper's Hill
- Coordinates: 51°49′48″N 2°09′29″W
- Country: England, United Kingdom
- Years active: c. 1836 (Note: 9 June 1836 marks the first written evidence of the event, though it is possible it began even earlier. See § Origins.) – present
- Most recent: 25 May 2026

The Cooper's Hill Cheese-Rolling and Wake is an annual event held on the Spring Bank Holiday at Cooper's Hill in Brockworth, Gloucestershire, England. Participants race down the 200-yard (180 m) long hill chasing a wheel of Double Gloucester cheese. Its earliest known written attestation was in 1836, though it is possibly even older. Now people from a wide range of countries take part in the competition as well. The Guardian in 2013 called it a "world-famous event", with winners coming from Australia, Belgium, Canada, Egypt, Germany, Japan, New Zealand, and the United States.

== Format ==
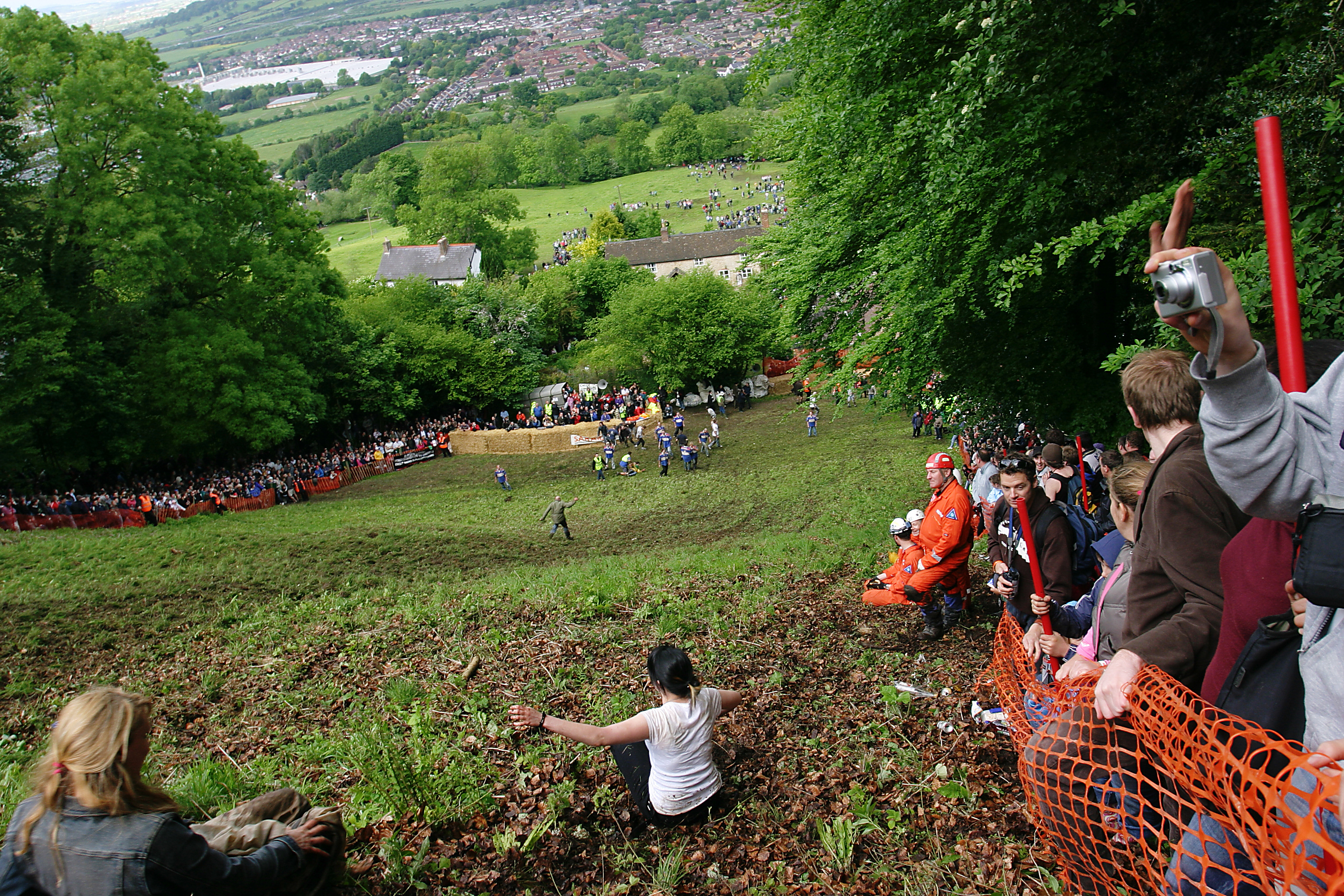
View down Cooper's Hill during the 2006 race

From the top of Cooper's Hill, a 7–9-pound (3–4-kilogram) round of Double Gloucester cheese is sent rolling down the hill, which is 287 metres (942 ft) high, 200 yards (180 m) long, and has a slope of around 50 percent. Competitors then start racing down the hill after the cheese.

The competitors aim to catch the cheese; however, it has around a one-second head start and can reach high speeds, enough to knock over and injure a spectator. The first person over the finish line at the bottom of the hill wins the cheese, even though the cheese is never actually caught. Multiple races are held during the day, with separate events for men and women. Participants in the downhill races must be over the age of 18.

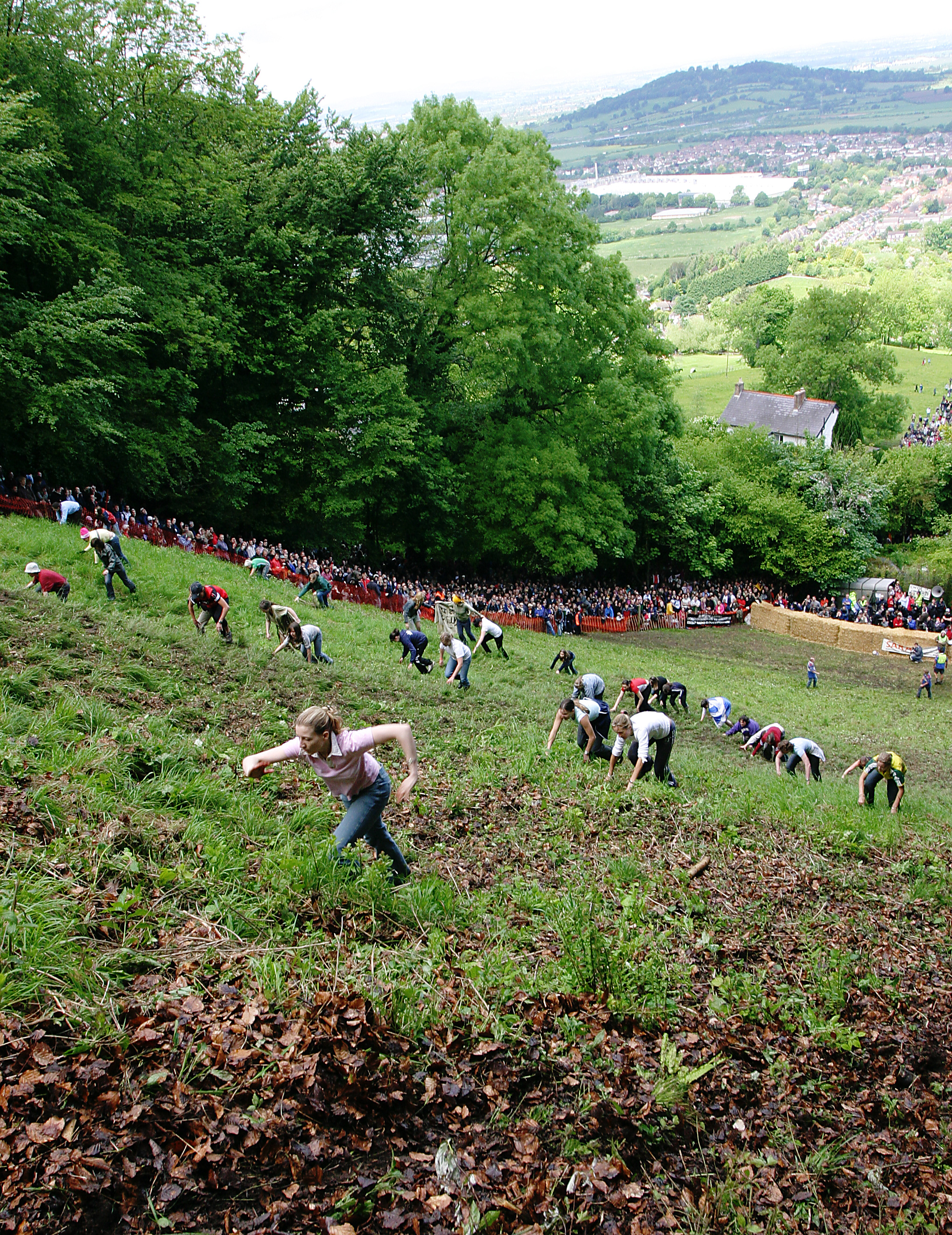
2006 Ladies Uphill Race

There are separate uphill races. Considerably less hazardous, these races are open to minors. In the past (e.g. 2014), the uphill race categories have been "boys 14 and under" and "girls 14 and under". In the most recent races in 2025, the children's uphill categories were "under 11" and "11 and over". The adult's uphill race was mixed.

The number of races held during the event has varied over the years, but there are usually four downhill races (three men's, one women's) and a number of uphill races (adults and children).

In the 2013 competition, a foam replica replaced the cheese for safety reasons, but a real cheese wheel was restored the following year.

== History ==
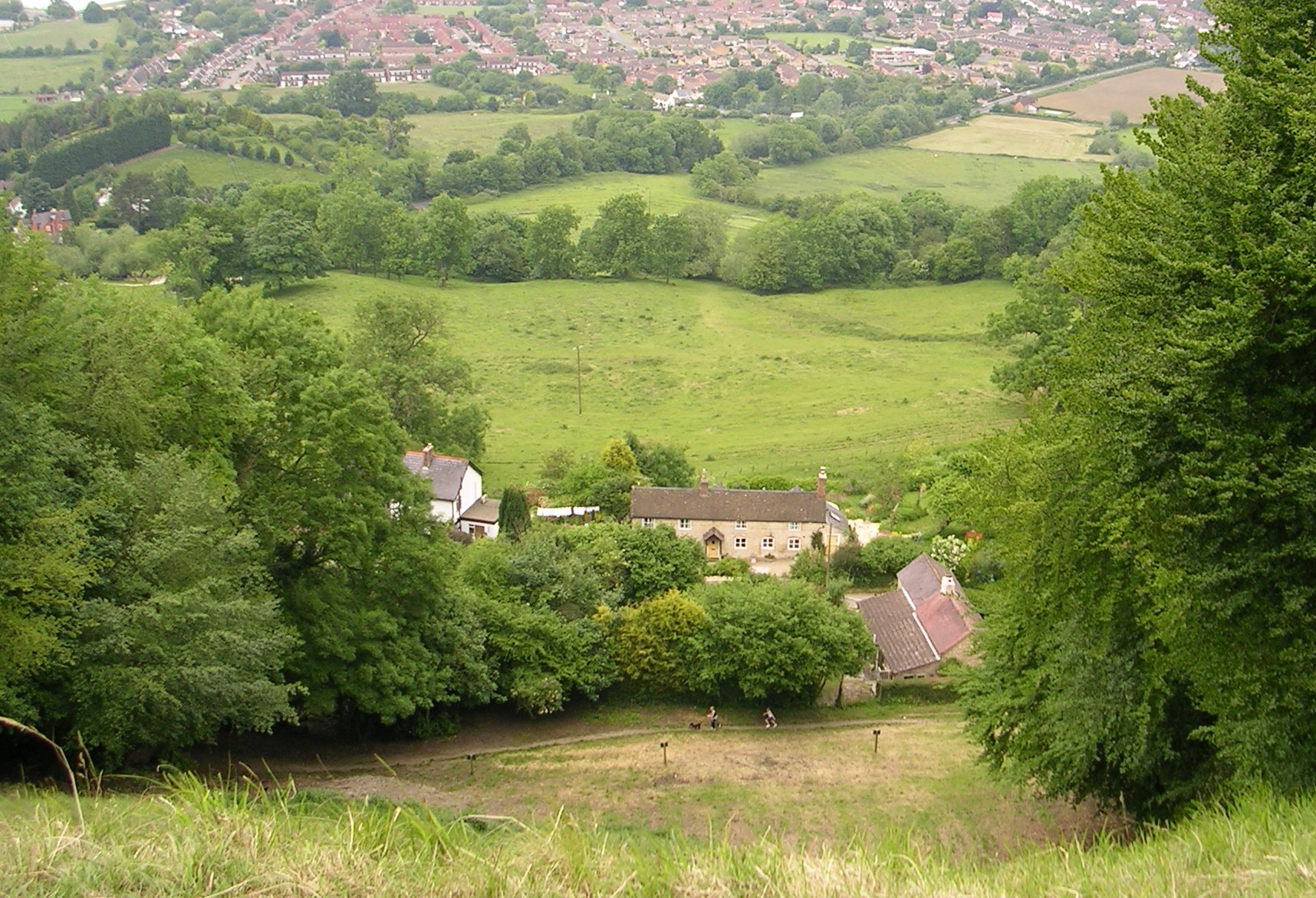
A view down Cooper's Hill, from the start point of the race to the finish, taken on 3 October 2005

The first written evidence of cheese rolling is found in a message written to the Gloucester town crier, published in Berrow's Worcester Journal on 9 June 1836. Despite this, the tradition is believed to be even older. The BBC states that there are "suggestions it began 10 years earlier" than the 1836 date. National Geographic said that the "first recorded Gloucestershire Cheese-Roll happened in 1826, although the tradition is possibly older". The BBC stated in 2025 that "theories suggest it may have started at least 600 years ago". Dorothy Gladys Spicer stated in the 1954 book "Yearbook of English Festivals" that the tradition had "been famous for at least five hundred years."

The event previously took place each Whit Monday, but was moved to the Spring Bank Holiday. According to Jean Jefferies, who has written a book about, and set up the original website for, the event: "It seems originally the event took place at midsummer", was moved "at some point" to Whit Monday, and then moved to the Spring Bank Holiday in 1967.

Two possible origins have been proposed for the ceremony. First, it may have evolved from a requirement for maintaining grazing rights on the common. Second, there may be pagan origins for the custom of rolling objects down the hill. It is thought that bundles of burning brushwood were rolled down the hill to represent the birth of the New Year after winter. Connected with this belief is the traditional scattering of buns, biscuits and sweets at the top of the hill by the Master of Ceremonies. This is said to be a fertility rite to encourage the fruits of harvest.

In 1982, a team of students from the University of Bristol filmed the 31 May event using film cameras, with one camera overcranked to produce slow motion.

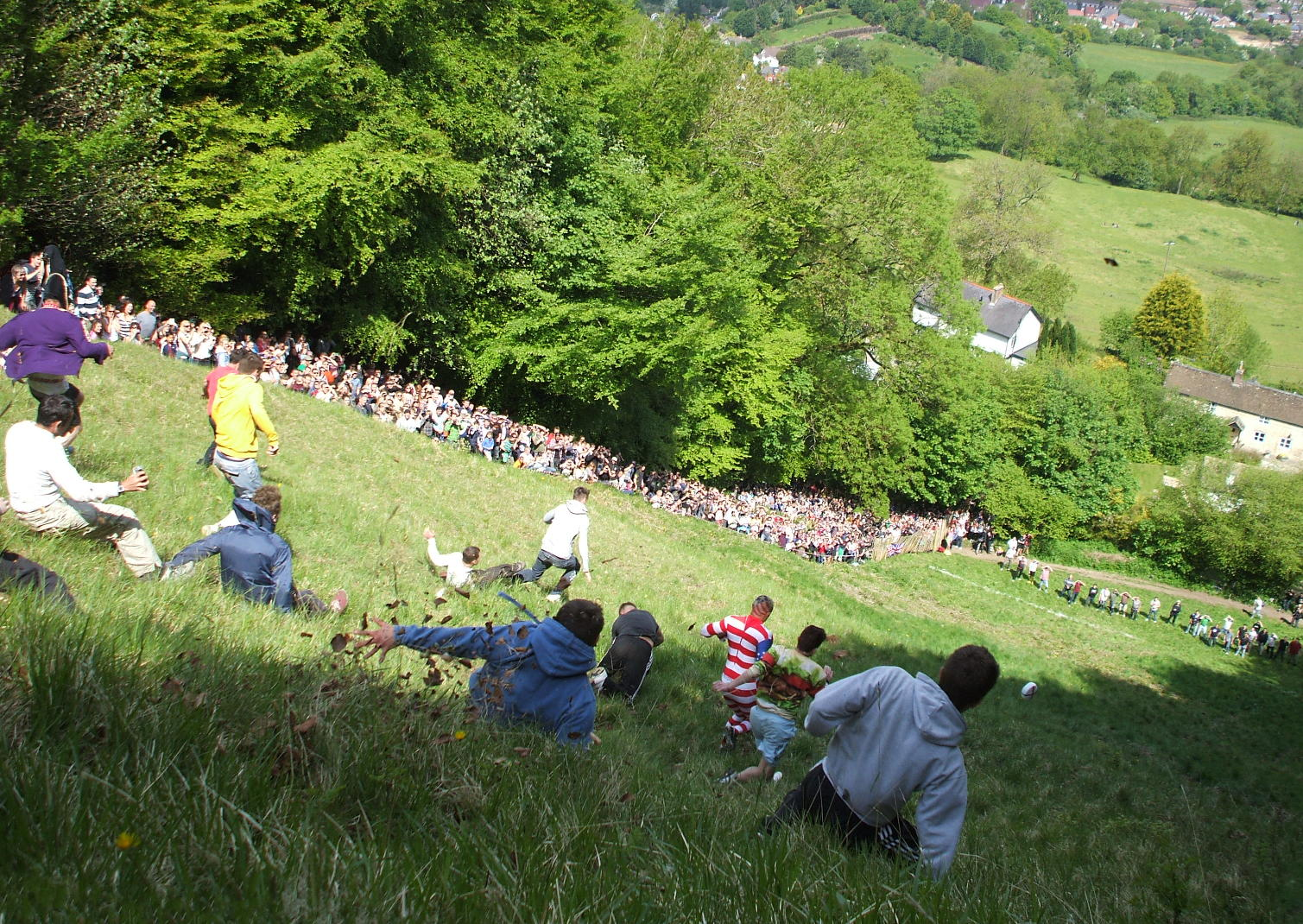
A race on 27 May 2013

In 1993, sixteen people were injured, four of them seriously, during the event. In 2009, safety concerns were raised after 15,000 spectators arrived, when there was only space for around 5,000. These concerns led to the organisers cancelling the 2010 event. Despite the cancellation, around 100 people attended and held an unofficial event.

In 2011, a new two-day ticketed event was proposed in order to address the safety concerns raised in previous years and to allow the event to continue operating. The proposals were received negatively due to the cost of tickets, and the proposed event was cancelled following the organisers receiving abuse. Despite the cancellation, the event continued unofficially with around 200 people attending. The event has continued without official management or planning alongside the Council Safety Advisory Group.

In 2020 and 2021, the event was cancelled as a result of the COVID-19 pandemic. It returned on Sunday 5 June 2022, ending a two-year absence. (Note: The spring bank holiday was moved to 2 June, due to the Platinum Jubilee of Elizabeth II.)

The 2026 edition of the event marked the first time in the competition's recorded history that every men's downhill race was won by non-British competitors, with the winning runners hailing from Germany, the Netherlands, and the United States.

== Cheese ==
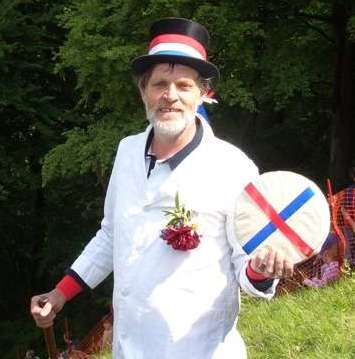
Photo from 2006 or earlier of master of ceremonies Rob Seex, holding a Double Gloucester cheese

The cheese currently used in the event is 7–9-pound (3–4-kilogram) Double Gloucester, a hard cheese traditionally made in a circular shape. Each is protected for the rolling by a wooden casing round the side, and it is decorated with ribbons at the start of the race. Formerly, three cheeses were presented by parishioners, and the cheeses were usually rolled by them. A collection is usually made now to purchase them, as well as sweets, and also to provide prize money.

Since 1988, the cheese has been supplied by local cheesemaker Diana Smart and her son Rod from their Churcham farm. In May 2013, a police inspector warned all of those involved in planning the event, including the 86-year-old cheesemaker, that they could be held responsible for any injuries. Diana Smart died in 2021.

In 2013, organisers of the event switched to a lightweight foam version of the cheese for safety reasons. In the second race of 2013, Australian Caleb Stalder managed to catch the fake cheese and claim victory despite being some way behind the leaders. In 2014, the organisers returned to using real cheese.

== Injuries ==
Due to the steepness and uneven surface of Cooper's Hill, there are usually several injuries each year. St John Ambulance have previously provided first aid cover at the event; however, this stopped in 2012 when the event was no longer being officially managed. The lack of official medical provision on site has led to concerns from the local resilience forum about the safety of the event.

Canadian competitor Delaney Irving won the ladies' race in 2023, despite finishing unconscious, and only learning of her victory in the medical enclosure. Six competitors were taken to hospital by ambulance for treatment following the event.

== Results ==
Winners of the Cooper's Hill Cheese-Rolling & Wake
Year	Race 1 (men's downhill)	Race 2 (men's downhill)	Race 3 (women's downhill)	Race 4 (men's downhill)	Race 5 (men's downhill)	Race 6 (11 and under uphill)	Race 7 (12 to 16 uphill)	Race 8 (adults' mixed uphill)	Notes
1948	Roy Mitchell (1)	Roy Mitchell (2)	Jean Simpson	M.J. Russell					
1949	Roy Mitchell (3)	J. Binder	Betty Hunt	Bernard Morgan (1)					
1950	T. Brewster	H. Ireland	M.E. Light	Ken Davis	Bernard Morgan (2)				
1951	Tom Holliday (1)	M.C. Pinchin	Jean MacDonald	J. Bailey					
1952	Tom Holliday (2)	Hugh Atkinson (1)	Hilary Cooke	no race					
1953	Tom Holliday (3)	Ronald Ray	Rosemary Cooke (1)	no race					
1954	Michael Price (1)	Eric Avent	Elke Ellaway	Hugh Atkinson (2)					
1955	Michael Price (2)	Hugh Atkinson (3)	Rosemary Cooke (2)	Roy Holliday					
1956	Michael Price (3)	Hugh Atkinson (4)	Rosemary Cooke (3)	Glyn Jenkins					Rosemary Cooke sets women's record of 3 wins
1957	Izzy John (1)	Izzy John (2)	June Wheeler	Hugh Atkinson (5)	Frank Faulkner				
1958	Izzy John (3)	Izzy John (4)	unknown	Clive Walker	Izzy John (5)				
1959	Izzy John (6)*	Izzy John (7)*	Mary Bancroft	unknown					* unconfirmed
1960	Izzy John (8)	Stanley Wilson-Copp	Sheena McBryde	Raymond Beard					
1961	Izzy John (9)	Izzy John (10)	no race	Paul Quarry (1)	Paul Quarry (2)				
1962	Paul Quarry (3)	Paul Quarry (4)	no race	Roger Windo (1)	Izzy John (11)				
1963	Roger Windo (2)	Roger Windo (3)	Pat Harding	Clive Whittaker (1)					
1964	Clive Whittaker (2)	Roger Windo (4)	Julie Tiffany	Izzy John (12)					Izzy John sets the record with unconfirmed 12 wins
1965	Raymond Giles (1)	Michael Davis	Janet Ballinger	Clive Whittaker (3)					
1966	Raymond Giles (2)	Raymond Giles (3)	Janet Beesley	Michael Giles					
1967	R.A. Copley	Eric Huckins	Diane Bowers (1)	George Duckett					
1968	Hugh Oxenham	Eric Huckins	Barbara Bayne	Michael Giles					
1969	Richard Giles (1)	Richard Giles (2)	Diane Bowers (2)	Joe Johnson					
1970	Richard Giles (3)	Richard Giles (4)	Lynda Burnell (1)	Peter Davis					Gloucestershire Echo wrongly reported her name as Lynda Burnett
1971	Steve Lott (1)	Peter Davis	Lynda Burnell (2)	Gordon Graham					
1972	Steve Lott (2)	Christopher Woodhouse (1)	Deborah Harwood (1)	John Hendzell	Steve Lott (3)				
1973	Christopher Woodhouse (2)	Alan Thorpe	Deborah Harwood (2)	Patrick Hendzell (1)					
1974	Stephen Giles	Patrick Hendzell (2)	Susan Keavy	Christopher Woodhouse (3)					
1975	Paul Chandler	Patrick Hendzell (3)	Joanna Evans (1)	Paul Brammer					
1976	George Duckett	Stephen Gyde (1)	Joanna Evans (2)	Paul Williams					
1977	Tony Hendzell	David Lawlor	Megan Morris	Rory Martin					
1978	Tony Hendzell	John Lowe	Janice McGrory	Stephen Gyde (2)					
1979	Stephen Gyde (3)	Stephen Gyde (4)	Candice Phillips	Tony Hendzell					
1980	Stephen Gyde (5)	Stephen Gyde (6)	Mandy Day	Stephen Gyde (7)					
1981	Kevin Gyde (1)	Kevin Gyde (2)	Amanda Turner (1)	Andy Fuller					
1982	Stephen Gyde (8)	Stephen Gyde (9)	Amanda Turner (2)	Kevin Gyde (3)					
1983	Colin Hill	Stephen Gyde (10)	Amanda Turner (3)	'Digger' Gardener					Amanda Turner ties the women's record of 3 wins
1984	Stephen Gyde (11)	Steven Brain (1)	Claudia Dart	Ian Campbell					
1985	Stephen Gyde (12)	Stephen Gyde (13)	Leticia Burns (1)	Costas Logothetis					
1986	Steven Brain (2)	Steven Brain (3)	Leticia Burns (2)	Stephen Gyde (14)					
1987	Steven Brain (4)	Stephen Gyde (15)	Rebecca Haines (1)	Steven Brain (5)					
1988	Stephen Gyde (16)	Stephen Gyde (17)	Rebecca Haines (2)	Steven Brain (6)					
1989	Paul Andrews	Lawrence Farlow	Kathleen Underwood	Julian Pritchard					
1990	Steven Brain (7)	Stephen Gyde (18)	Jacqueline McGinn	Steven Brain (8)					
1991	Stephen Gyde (19)	Stephen Gyde (20)	Christie Sweeney	Stephen Gyde (21)					Stephen Gyde retires with an all-time record of 21 wins
1992	Terry Sawczuk	Stuart Heggs		Rob Preece (1)	Star Royles				
1993	Rob Preece (2)	Rob Preece (3)		Jamie Barnes	Andrew Deveson (1)				
1994	Rob Preece (4)	Andrew Deveson (2)		Star Royles	Craig Carter (1)				
1995	Stephen Brain (9)	Jonathan Smith	Claire Carter	Darren Yates					
1996	Steven Brain (10)	Harry Hancy	Marie Andow	John Shelton					
1997	Steven Brain (11)	Steven Brain (12)	Tina Rimmer	Craig Carter (2)					
1998	Peter Astman		Amelia Hardwick						Two races cancelled for safety due to 33 injuries the previous year
1999	Steven Brain (13)	Steven Brain (14)	Helen Thorpe	Steven Brain (15)					
2000	Steven Brain (16)	Steven Brain (17)	Kirby Shepherd	Craig Brown (1)					
2001	Event cancelled due to the 2001 United Kingdom foot-and-mouth outbreak. Cheese still rolled to maintain tradition								
2002	Simon Fowler	Craig Brown (2)	Saskia Thomas	Alan Barth					Event took place on Tuesday due to Queen's Jubilee celebrations
2003	Event cancelled due to volunteer safety team being diverted to assist in the aftermath of the 2003 Boumerdès earthquake. Cheese still rolled to maintain tradition.								
2004	Padam Shreer (Nepal)	Marc Ellis (New Zealand)	Dionne Carter (1) (New Zealand)	Aaron Walden (1) (United Kingdom)		Boys'	Boys'	Men's	Padam Shreer becomes the first winner from Asia. Marc Ellis and Dionne Carter become the first winners from Oceania
2004	Padam Shreer (Nepal)	Marc Ellis (New Zealand)	Dionne Carter (1) (New Zealand)	Aaron Walden (1) (United Kingdom)		Girls'	Girls'	Women's	Padam Shreer becomes the first winner from Asia. Marc Ellis and Dionne Carter become the first winners from Oceania
2005	Jason Crowther (1) (United Kingdom)	Chris Anderson (1) (United Kingdom)	Dionne Carter (2) (New Zealand)	Aaron Walden (2) (United Kingdom)		Boys'	Boys'	Men's	Adam Dunsford wins "uphill open race".
2005	Jason Crowther (1) (United Kingdom)	Chris Anderson (1) (United Kingdom)	Dionne Carter (2) (New Zealand)	Aaron Walden (2) (United Kingdom)			Chris Calver-Jones	Adam Dunsford	Adam Dunsford wins "uphill open race".
2005	Jason Crowther (1) (United Kingdom)	Chris Anderson (1) (United Kingdom)	Dionne Carter (2) (New Zealand)	Aaron Walden (2) (United Kingdom)		Girls'	Girls'	Women's	Adam Dunsford wins "uphill open race".
2005	Jason Crowther (1) (United Kingdom)	Chris Anderson (1) (United Kingdom)	Dionne Carter (2) (New Zealand)	Aaron Walden (2) (United Kingdom)			Hannah Jones		Adam Dunsford wins "uphill open race".
2006	Jason Crowther (2) (United Kingdom)	Craig Fairley (1) (United Kingdom)	Dionne Carter (3) (New Zealand)	Chris Anderson (2) (United Kingdom)	Andrew Brewin (United Kingdom) (Note: Fifth race added for more competitors.)	Boys'	Boys'	Men's	Dionne Carter ties the women's record of 3 wins.
2006	Jason Crowther (2) (United Kingdom)	Craig Fairley (1) (United Kingdom)	Dionne Carter (3) (New Zealand)	Chris Anderson (2) (United Kingdom)	Andrew Brewin (United Kingdom)	Josh Prike		Julian Gray (New Zealand)	Dionne Carter ties the women's record of 3 wins.
2006	Jason Crowther (2) (United Kingdom)	Craig Fairley (1) (United Kingdom)	Dionne Carter (3) (New Zealand)	Chris Anderson (2) (United Kingdom)	Andrew Brewin (United Kingdom)	Girls'	Girls'	Women's	Dionne Carter ties the women's record of 3 wins.
2006	Jason Crowther (2) (United Kingdom)	Craig Fairley (1) (United Kingdom)	Dionne Carter (3) (New Zealand)	Chris Anderson (2) (United Kingdom)	Andrew Brewin (United Kingdom)	Kelley Beckett		Ruth Bradbrook	Dionne Carter ties the women's record of 3 wins.
2007	Jason Crowther (3) (United Kingdom)	Aaron Walden (3) (United Kingdom)	Jemima Bullock (New Zealand)	Alan Morris (United Kingdom)	Chris Anderson (3) (United Kingdom)	Boys'	Boys'	Men's	
2007	Jason Crowther (3) (United Kingdom)	Aaron Walden (3) (United Kingdom)	Jemima Bullock (New Zealand)	Alan Morris (United Kingdom)	Chris Anderson (3) (United Kingdom)	Girls'	Girls'	Women's	
2008	Chris Anderson (4) (United Kingdom)	Peter Mackenzie-Shaw (United Kingdom)	Flo Early (1) (United Kingdom)	Craig Fairley (2) (United Kingdom)	Wade Sansom (United Kingdom)	Boys'	Boys'	Men's	
2008	Chris Anderson (4) (United Kingdom)	Peter Mackenzie-Shaw (United Kingdom)	Flo Early (1) (United Kingdom)	Craig Fairley (2) (United Kingdom)	Wade Sansom (United Kingdom)	Girls'	Girls'	Women's	
2009	Chris Anderson (5) (United Kingdom)	Scott Bevan (United Kingdom)	Michelle Kokiri-Gisbon (New Zealand)	Chris Anderson (6) (United Kingdom)	Josh Geitz (Australia)	Boys'	Boys'	Men's	
2009	Chris Anderson (5) (United Kingdom)	Scott Bevan (United Kingdom)	Michelle Kokiri-Gisbon (New Zealand)	Chris Anderson (6) (United Kingdom)	Josh Geitz (Australia)	Jason Baugh		Toby Payton (New Zealand)	
2009	Chris Anderson (5) (United Kingdom)	Scott Bevan (United Kingdom)	Michelle Kokiri-Gisbon (New Zealand)	Chris Anderson (6) (United Kingdom)	Josh Geitz (Australia)	Girls'	Girls'	Women's	
2009	Chris Anderson (5) (United Kingdom)	Scott Bevan (United Kingdom)	Michelle Kokiri-Gisbon (New Zealand)	Chris Anderson (6) (United Kingdom)	Josh Geitz (Australia)	Maddie Morris		Jessica Ledger (Australia)	
2010	Chris Anderson (7) (United Kingdom)	Craig Fairley (3) (United Kingdom)	Tanya Silverman (United Kingdom)	Chris Anderson (8) (United Kingdom)		Boys'	Boys'	Men's	
2010	Chris Anderson (7) (United Kingdom)	Craig Fairley (3) (United Kingdom)	Tanya Silverman (United Kingdom)	Chris Anderson (8) (United Kingdom)		Girls'	Girls'	Women's	
2011	Chris Anderson (9) (United Kingdom)	Chris Anderson (10) (United Kingdom)	Jo Guest (United Kingdom)	Chris Anderson (11) (United Kingdom)		Boys'	Boys'	Men's	
2011	Chris Anderson (9) (United Kingdom)	Chris Anderson (10) (United Kingdom)	Jo Guest (United Kingdom)	Chris Anderson (11) (United Kingdom)		Girls'	Girls'	Women's	
2012	Chris Anderson (12) (United Kingdom)	Chris Anderson (13) (United Kingdom)	Lucy Townsend (1) (United Kingdom)	Craig Fairley (4) (United Kingdom)		Boys'	Boys'	Men's	
2012	Chris Anderson (12) (United Kingdom)	Chris Anderson (13) (United Kingdom)	Lucy Townsend (1) (United Kingdom)	Craig Fairley (4) (United Kingdom)		Girls'	Girls'	Women's	
2013	Kenny Rackers (United States)	Keleb Stalder (Australia)	Lucy Townsend (2) (United Kingdom)	Ryan Fairley (1) (United Kingdom)	Tomoaki Tanaka (Japan)	Boys'	Boys'	Men's	Kenny Rackers becomes the first winner from North America.
2013	Kenny Rackers (United States)	Keleb Stalder (Australia)	Lucy Townsend (2) (United Kingdom)	Ryan Fairley (1) (United Kingdom)	Tomoaki Tanaka (Japan)			Kenny Rackers (United States)	Kenny Rackers becomes the first winner from North America.
2013	Kenny Rackers (United States)	Keleb Stalder (Australia)	Lucy Townsend (2) (United Kingdom)	Ryan Fairley (1) (United Kingdom)	Tomoaki Tanaka (Japan)	Girls'	Girls'	Women's	Kenny Rackers becomes the first winner from North America.
2014	Joshua Shepherd (1) (United Kingdom)	Ryan Fairley (2) (United Kingdom)	Lucy Townsend (3) (United Kingdom)	Sheldon Ronald (Australia)		Boys'	Boys'	Men's	Lucy Townsend ties the women's record of 3 wins. Sam Parrant wins "mixed, open uphill" race. Kaspar Wickens-Shaw wins "boys 14 and under" uphill race. Mollie D’Arcy Rice wins "girls 14 and under" race.
2014	Joshua Shepherd (1) (United Kingdom)	Ryan Fairley (2) (United Kingdom)	Lucy Townsend (3) (United Kingdom)	Sheldon Ronald (Australia)		Kaspar Wickens-Shaw (1) (United Kingdom)		Sam Parrant	Lucy Townsend ties the women's record of 3 wins. Sam Parrant wins "mixed, open uphill" race. Kaspar Wickens-Shaw wins "boys 14 and under" uphill race. Mollie D’Arcy Rice wins "girls 14 and under" race.
2014	Joshua Shepherd (1) (United Kingdom)	Ryan Fairley (2) (United Kingdom)	Lucy Townsend (3) (United Kingdom)	Sheldon Ronald (Australia)		Girls'	Girls'	Women's	Lucy Townsend ties the women's record of 3 wins. Sam Parrant wins "mixed, open uphill" race. Kaspar Wickens-Shaw wins "boys 14 and under" uphill race. Mollie D’Arcy Rice wins "girls 14 and under" race.
2014	Joshua Shepherd (1) (United Kingdom)	Ryan Fairley (2) (United Kingdom)	Lucy Townsend (3) (United Kingdom)	Sheldon Ronald (Australia)			Mollie D’Arcy Rice		
2015	Chris Anderson (14) (United Kingdom)	Ryan Fairley (3) (United Kingdom)	Keavy Morgan (1) (United Kingdom)	Chris Anderson (15) (United Kingdom)		Boys'	Boys'	Men's	. Kaspar Wickens-Shaw wins "boys 14 and under" uphill race. Kacie Anderson wins "girls 14 and under" uphill race.
2015	Chris Anderson (14) (United Kingdom)	Ryan Fairley (3) (United Kingdom)	Keavy Morgan (1) (United Kingdom)	Chris Anderson (15) (United Kingdom)		Kaspar Wickens-Shaw (2) (United Kingdom)			. Kaspar Wickens-Shaw wins "boys 14 and under" uphill race. Kacie Anderson wins "girls 14 and under" uphill race.
2015	Chris Anderson (14) (United Kingdom)	Ryan Fairley (3) (United Kingdom)	Keavy Morgan (1) (United Kingdom)	Chris Anderson (15) (United Kingdom)		Girls'	Girls'	Women's	. Kaspar Wickens-Shaw wins "boys 14 and under" uphill race. Kacie Anderson wins "girls 14 and under" uphill race.
2015	Chris Anderson (14) (United Kingdom)	Ryan Fairley (3) (United Kingdom)	Keavy Morgan (1) (United Kingdom)	Chris Anderson (15) (United Kingdom)			Kacie Anderson (1) (United Kingdom)		. Kaspar Wickens-Shaw wins "boys 14 and under" uphill race. Kacie Anderson wins "girls 14 and under" uphill race.
2016	Chris Anderson (16) (United Kingdom)	Chris Anderson (17) (United Kingdom)	Flo Early (United Kingdom) (2)	Ryan Fairley (4) (United Kingdom)		Boys'	Boys'	Men's	
2016	Chris Anderson (16) (United Kingdom)	Chris Anderson (17) (United Kingdom)	Flo Early (United Kingdom) (2)	Ryan Fairley (4) (United Kingdom)		Girls'	Girls'	Women's	
2017	Chris Anderson (18) (United Kingdom)	Chris Anderson (19) (United Kingdom)	Keavy Morgan (2) (United Kingdom)	Chris Anderson (20) (United Kingdom)		Boys'	Boys'	Men's	
2017	Chris Anderson (18) (United Kingdom)	Chris Anderson (19) (United Kingdom)	Keavy Morgan (2) (United Kingdom)	Chris Anderson (20) (United Kingdom)		Girls'	Girls'	Women's	
2017	Chris Anderson (18) (United Kingdom)	Chris Anderson (19) (United Kingdom)	Keavy Morgan (2) (United Kingdom)	Chris Anderson (20) (United Kingdom)			Kacie Anderson (2)		
2018	Chris Anderson (21) (United Kingdom)	Christopher Parperis (United Kingdom)	Flo Early (3) (United Kingdom)	Chris Anderson (22) (United Kingdom)		Boys'	Boys'	Men's	Chris Anderson sets all-time record of 22 wins Flo Early ties the women's record of 3 wins
2018	Chris Anderson (21) (United Kingdom)	Christopher Parperis (United Kingdom)	Flo Early (3) (United Kingdom)	Chris Anderson (22) (United Kingdom)		Girls'	Girls'	Women's	Chris Anderson sets all-time record of 22 wins Flo Early ties the women's record of 3 wins
2018	Chris Anderson (21) (United Kingdom)	Christopher Parperis (United Kingdom)	Flo Early (3) (United Kingdom)	Chris Anderson (22) (United Kingdom)		Leilani Ryder (1)		Amy Hill	Chris Anderson sets all-time record of 22 wins Flo Early ties the women's record of 3 wins
2019	Max McDougall (United Kingdom)	Ryan Fairley (5) (United Kingdom)	Flo Early (4) (United Kingdom)	Mark Kit (Canada)		Boys'	Boys'	Men's	Flo Early sets a new women's record of 4 wins
2019	Max McDougall (United Kingdom)	Ryan Fairley (5) (United Kingdom)	Flo Early (4) (United Kingdom)	Mark Kit (Canada)			Jacob Perkins		Flo Early sets a new women's record of 4 wins
2019	Max McDougall (United Kingdom)	Ryan Fairley (5) (United Kingdom)	Flo Early (4) (United Kingdom)	Mark Kit (Canada)		Girls'	Girls'	Women's	Flo Early sets a new women's record of 4 wins
2019	Max McDougall (United Kingdom)	Ryan Fairley (5) (United Kingdom)	Flo Early (4) (United Kingdom)	Mark Kit (Canada)		Leilani Ryder (2)	Millie Elliot		Flo Early sets a new women's record of 4 wins
2020	Event cancelled due to the COVID-19 pandemic in England. Cheese still rolled to maintain tradition.								
2021	Event cancelled due to the COVID-19 pandemic in England. Cheese still rolled to maintain tradition.								
2022	Chris Anderson (23) (United Kingdom)	Jamie Evans (United Kingdom)	Abby Lampe (1) (United States)	Robbe Gabriels (Belgium) / Amr El Shourbagy (Egypt) (joint winners)		Boys'	Boys'	Men's	Chris Anderson retires with an all-time record of 23 wins Robbe Gabriels becomes the first winner from Continental Europe. Amr El Shourbagy becomes the first winner from Africa.
2022	Chris Anderson (23) (United Kingdom)	Jamie Evans (United Kingdom)	Abby Lampe (1) (United States)	Robbe Gabriels (Belgium) / Amr El Shourbagy (Egypt) (joint winners)		Alfie Townsend (1)			Chris Anderson retires with an all-time record of 23 wins Robbe Gabriels becomes the first winner from Continental Europe. Amr El Shourbagy becomes the first winner from Africa.
2022	Chris Anderson (23) (United Kingdom)	Jamie Evans (United Kingdom)	Abby Lampe (1) (United States)	Robbe Gabriels (Belgium) / Amr El Shourbagy (Egypt) (joint winners)		Girls'	Girls'	Women's	Chris Anderson retires with an all-time record of 23 wins Robbe Gabriels becomes the first winner from Continental Europe. Amr El Shourbagy becomes the first winner from Africa.
2022	Chris Anderson (23) (United Kingdom)	Jamie Evans (United Kingdom)	Abby Lampe (1) (United States)	Robbe Gabriels (Belgium) / Amr El Shourbagy (Egypt) (joint winners)		Leilani Ryder (3)			Chris Anderson retires with an all-time record of 23 wins Robbe Gabriels becomes the first winner from Continental Europe. Amr El Shourbagy becomes the first winner from Africa.
2023	Matt Crolla (United Kingdom)	Cooper Cummings (United States)	Delaney Irving (Canada)	Ryoya Minami (Japan)		Boys'	Boys'	Men's	Cooper Cummings sets record for fastest race time at 13 seconds
2023	Matt Crolla (United Kingdom)	Cooper Cummings (United States)	Delaney Irving (Canada)	Ryoya Minami (Japan)		Riley Parker	Rocco Cove	Elliot	Cooper Cummings sets record for fastest race time at 13 seconds
2023	Matt Crolla (United Kingdom)	Cooper Cummings (United States)	Delaney Irving (Canada)	Ryoya Minami (Japan)		Girls'	Girls'	Women's	Cooper Cummings sets record for fastest race time at 13 seconds
2023	Matt Crolla (United Kingdom)	Cooper Cummings (United States)	Delaney Irving (Canada)	Ryoya Minami (Japan)		Evie	Leilani Ryder (4)	Megan	Cooper Cummings sets record for fastest race time at 13 seconds
2024	Tom Kopke (1) (Germany)	Dylan Twiss (Australia)	Abby Lampe (2) (United States)	Joshua Shepherd (2) (United Kingdom)		Boys'	Boys'	Men's	Tom Kopke, known online as Tooleko, is the first person from Germany to win.
2024	Tom Kopke (1) (Germany)	Dylan Twiss (Australia)	Abby Lampe (2) (United States)	Joshua Shepherd (2) (United Kingdom)		Louie Baker (1)	Liam Daunter		Tom Kopke, known online as Tooleko, is the first person from Germany to win.
2024	Tom Kopke (1) (Germany)	Dylan Twiss (Australia)	Abby Lampe (2) (United States)	Joshua Shepherd (2) (United Kingdom)		Girls'	Girls'	Women's	Tom Kopke, known online as Tooleko, is the first person from Germany to win.
2024	Tom Kopke (1) (Germany)	Dylan Twiss (Australia)	Abby Lampe (2) (United States)	Joshua Shepherd (2) (United Kingdom)		Orion Ryder	Leilani Ryder (5)		Tom Kopke, known online as Tooleko, is the first person from Germany to win.
2025	Tom Kopke (2) (Germany)	Luke Preece (United Kingdom)	Ava Sender Logan (United Kingdom)	Byron Smith (New Zealand)		Boys'	Boys'	Men's	Luke Preece (also reported as Luke Briggs) is the son of four-time winner Rob Preece.
2025	Tom Kopke (2) (Germany)	Luke Preece (United Kingdom)	Ava Sender Logan (United Kingdom)	Byron Smith (New Zealand)		Louie Baker (2)	Alfie Townsend (2)	?	Luke Preece (also reported as Luke Briggs) is the son of four-time winner Rob Preece.
2025	Tom Kopke (2) (Germany)	Luke Preece (United Kingdom)	Ava Sender Logan (United Kingdom)	Byron Smith (New Zealand)		Girls'	Girls'	Women's	Luke Preece (also reported as Luke Briggs) is the son of four-time winner Rob Preece.
2025	Tom Kopke (2) (Germany)	Luke Preece (United Kingdom)	Ava Sender Logan (United Kingdom)	Byron Smith (New Zealand)		Sadie	Leilani Ryder (6)	Ariel Dempsey (1) (United States)	Luke Preece (also reported as Luke Briggs) is the son of four-time winner Rob Preece.
2026	Tom Kopke (3) (Germany)	Niels Wennemars (Netherlands)	Alix Heugas (France)	Otto Linkogle (United States)		Boys'	Boys'	Men's	William and Xander Anderson are sons of 23-time winner Chris Anderson
2026	Tom Kopke (3) (Germany)	Niels Wennemars (Netherlands)	Alix Heugas (France)	Otto Linkogle (United States)		William Anderson (England)	Xander Anderson (England)	Jamie (England)	William and Xander Anderson are sons of 23-time winner Chris Anderson
2026	Tom Kopke (3) (Germany)	Niels Wennemars (Netherlands)	Alix Heugas (France)	Otto Linkogle (United States)		Girls'	Girls'	Women's	William and Xander Anderson are sons of 23-time winner Chris Anderson
2026	Tom Kopke (3) (Germany)	Niels Wennemars (Netherlands)	Alix Heugas (France)	Otto Linkogle (United States)		Ariadne	Dotty (England)	Ariel Dempsey (2) (United States)	William and Xander Anderson are sons of 23-time winner Chris Anderson

Note: All competitors before 2004 were British so a nationality flag is omitted.

=== Multiple winners ===
Men’s Champion	Wins	Years
Chris Anderson	23	2005–2022
Stephen Gyde	21	1976–1991
Steven Brain	17	1984–2000
Islwyn "Izzy" John	12	1957–1964
Hugh Atkinson	5	1952, 1954, 1955, 1956, 1957
Ryan Fairley	5	2013, 2014, 2015, 2016, 2019
Craig Fairley	4	2006, 2008, 2010, 2012
Richard Giles	4	1969, 1969, 1970, 1970
Paul Quarry	4	1961, 1961, 1962, 1962
Roger Windo	4	1962, 1962, 1963, 1964
Jason Crowther	3	2005, 2006, 2007
Raymond Giles	3	1965, 1966, 1966
Kevin Gyde	3	1981, 1981, 1982
Patrick Hendzell	3	1973, 1974, 1975
Tony Hendzell	3	1977, 1978, 1979
Tom Holliday	3	1951, 1952, 1953
Tom Kopke	3	2024, 2025, 2026
Steve Lott	3	1971, 1972, 1972
Roy Mitchell	3	1948, 1948, 1949
Michael Price	3	1954, 1955, 1956
Aaron Walden	3	2004, 2005, 2007
Clive Whittaker	3	1963, 1964, 1965
Christopher Woodhouse	3	1972, 1973, 1974
Craig Brown	2	2000, 2002
Craig Carter	2	1994, 1997
Peter Davis	2	1970, 1971
Andrew Deveson	2	1993, 1994
Eric Huckins	2	1967, 1968
Bernard Morgan	2	1949, 1950
Star Royles	2	1992, 1994
Joshua Shepherd	2	2014, 2024

Women’s Champion	Wins	Years
Flo Early	4	2008, 2016, 2018, 2019
Dionne Carter	3	2004, 2005, 2006
Rosemary Cooke	3	1953, 1955, 1956
Lucy Townsend	3	2012, 2013, 2014
Amanda Turner	3	1981, 1982, 1983
Diane Bowers	2	1967, 1969
Lynda Burnell	2	1970, 1971
Leticia Burns	2	1985, 1986
Joanna Evans	2	1975, 1976
Rebecca Haines	2	1987, 1988
Deborah Harwood	2	1972, 1973
Abby Lampe	2	2022, 2024
Keavy Morgan	2	2015, 2017

Women's Uphill Champion	Wins	Years
Ariel Dempsey	2	2025, 2026

Children's Uphill Champion	Wins	Years
Leilani Ryder	6	2018, 2019, 2022–2025
Kacie Anderson	2	2015, 2017
Louie Baker	2	2024, 2025
Alfie Townsend	2	2022, 2025
Kaspar Wickens-Shaw	2	2014, 2015

== Cheese-rolling in popular culture ==
- 1948: Cheese Rolling on Cooper's Hill, a painting by Charles March Gere, is part of the Museum of Gloucester collection, and depicts the event.

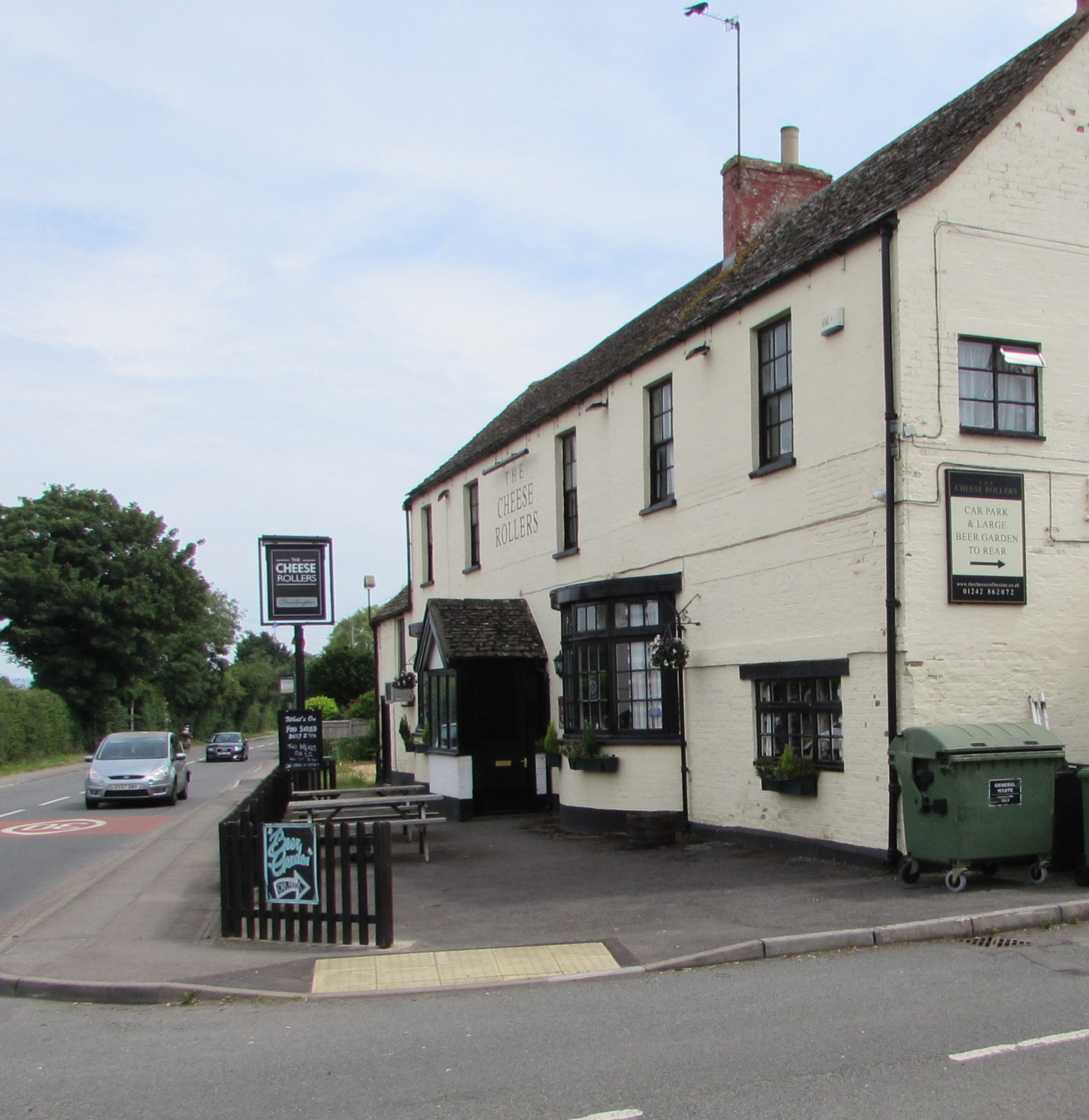
The Cheese Rollers Pub & Restaurant, Shurdington, 2019

- Early 1970s: The New Inn pub was renamed 'The Cheese Rollers Bar & Restaurant' in the early 1970s. Located in the neighbouring village of Shurdington, it is named after the event, and has a collection of previous cheese casings along with photographs and articles about the event.
- 1997: The American author Thomas Pynchon, in his novel Mason & Dixon, describes the rolling of a fictitious "octuple Gloucester," a wheel 512 times more massive than ordinary, in the Gloucestershire village of Randwick.
- 2006: Comedian Bridget Christie performed a show about cheese rolling at the Edinburgh Festival Fringe, inspired by seeing the Cooper's Hill event as a child.
- 2008: Cheese rolling was featured in the first episode of the Five television series Rory & Paddy's Great British Adventure, broadcast on 13 August 2008, and was described as "the grandaddy of weird sports" by presenters Rory McGrath and Paddy McGuinness.
- 2009: The video for the single "Can You Give It" by the Maccabees was filmed around the event, and featured Chris Anderson, the most successful known cheese roller.
- 2010: English author Terry Prachett referenced cheese rolling in his urban fantasy novel, I Shall Wear Midnight. Pratchett made the cheese roll a competition between the humans and the fairy folk known as the Nac Mac Feegle who used a sentient cheese, Horace, to win the race.
- 2018: The contest was the subject of the BBC One programme The Great Cheese Chase. The contest was also featured in the German reality show Joko gegen Klaas – Das Duell um die Welt, in which former German footballer Thorsten Legat was expected to participate but ultimately refused to do so.
- 2019: Let's Roll is a short film directed by Chris Thomas about a teenage girl, Antonia (Amy Bowden), attempting to emulate her brother's success in cheese rolling. The film was screened at the BAFTA-qualifying Norwich and Edinburgh film festivals.
- 2019: Royal Mail issued a collectible stamp edition titled UK Weird and Wonderful Customs, which included Bog snorkelling, the World Gurning Championship, Up Helly Aa, Burning the Clocks, the 'Obby 'Oss festival, Samhain Celtic festival (Halloween), the Abbots Bromley Horn Dance, and cheese rolling at Cooper's Hill.
- 2020: Netflix released the documentary series We Are the Champions, which covered six unusual events and competitions from around the world, beginning with cheese rolling at Cooper's Hill. The episode follows Flo Early in her preparations for the 2019 event and her attempt to win the women's race for the fourth time.
- 2021: The game Animal Crossing: New Horizons featured a special item called Double Gloucester cheese, available only from 22 to 31 May, coinciding with the traditional period of the event.
- 2023: The Longest Johns and El Pony Pisador released the joint album The Longest Pony, which included "Wheels of Glory" as the opening track. This later led to the bands bringing a wheel of Double Gloucester cheese on their February 2025 Longest Pony tour.
- 2025: A multiplayer PC game titled Cheese Rolling was released on Steam. Players control ragdoll medieval characters competing to catch a cheese wheel rolling down various steep slopes loosely modelled after Cooper's Hill. It was released on 20 August 2025 by developer The Interviewed.

== See also ==
- Coopers Edge
- Cooper's Hill, Brockworth
