= Chelmsford 123 =

British television series

- title screen
- Genre: Comedy
- Created by: Rory McGrath; Jimmy Mulville
- Written by: Rory McGrath; Jimmy Mulville
- Starring: Jimmy Mulville; Rory McGrath; Philip Pope; Neil Pearson
- Country of origin: United Kingdom
- Original languages: English, Latin
- No. of series: 2
- No. of episodes: 13

Production
- Running time: 24 minutes
- Production company: Hat Trick Productions

Original release
- Network: Channel 4
- Release: 9 March 1988 – 20 February 1990

Chelmsford 123 is a British television sitcom produced for Channel 4 by Hat Trick Productions. It originally ran for two series, of six and seven episodes respectively, between 9 March 1988 and 20 February 1990.

The series is set in the British town of Chelmsford in the year AD 123 and concerned the power struggle between Roman governor Aulus Paulinus (Jimmy Mulville) and the British chieftain, Badvoc (Rory McGrath). Britain is a miserable place, cold and wet – just the place to exile Aulus for accidentally insulting the Emperor's horse, but it also give him something useful to do. Aulus (probably a play on Aulus Platorius Nepos, the real governor of Roman Britain between 122 and 125) is a rather delicate Roman and is usually outwitted by the scheming Badvoc, who has not had a haircut for twenty-five years. There are also appearances by many of the other regular "Hat Trick" actors, previously seen in shows such as Who Dares Wins.

Both series are available to stream on Channel 4, and have been shown in the UK on Rewind TV.

Series 1 and 2 were released on DVD by Acorn Media UK on 15 September 2011.

== Principal cast ==
- Rory McGrath as Badvoc, A British chieftain
- Jimmy Mulville as Aulus Paulinus, the Roman Governor of Britain
- Philip Pope as Grasientus, Aulus' Brother in-law. (Pope also wrote the series' title music.)
- Howard Lew Lewis as Blag
- Neil Pearson as Mungo
- Erika Hoffman as Gargamadua, Badvoc's girlfriend (Series 1 only)
- Robert Austin as Functio (Series 1 only)
- Geoffrey McGivern as Wolfbane (one episode in Series 1, regular cast member in Series 2)

Also appearing in a number of episodes were:

- Geoffrey Whitehead as Viatorus, engineer, bringer of rain, sculptor (3 episodes)
- Andy Hamilton as Taranis, British "warrior" (2 episodes) (also sometime programme associate).
- Chris Langham as The Gate Guard and later Chief Of Security (2 episodes)
- Bill Wallis as Emperor Hadrian (2 episodes).

== Episode list ==
=== Series 1: 1988 ===
- Arrivederci Roma—9 March 1988 (sections in Italy played entirely in Latin, until Aulus arrives in Britain)
- What's Your Poison?—16 March 1988
- The Girl of My Dreams—23 March 1988
- One For The Road—30 March 1988
- Vidi Vici Veni—6 April 1988
- Peeled Grapes and Pedicures—13 April 1988

=== Series 2: 1990 ===
- Heads You Lose—9 January 1990
- Get Well Soon—16 January 1990
- Bird Trouble—23 January 1990
- Odi, et Amo—30 January 1990
- The Secret War—6 February 1990
- Mine's a Double—13 February 1990
- Something Beginning With 'E' —20 February 1990 (as with first episode, sections in Italy played entirely in Latin, until the Emperor arrives in Britain)

== See also ==
British sitcom
