= Christopher Anderson =

Christopher Anderson may refer to:

- Christopher Anderson (theologian) (1782–1852), Scottish theologian
- Christopher M. Anderson, American music director
- Christopher W. Anderson or C. W. Anderson (born 1970), American wrestler, real name Chris Wright
- Christopher Anderson (born 1972), American folk musician, part of Chris and Thomas
- Christopher B. Anderson (born 1976), American ecologist
- Christopher Anderson (photographer) (born 1970), Canadian photographer

== See also ==
- Chris Anderson (disambiguation)
- Chris Andersen (born 1978), American former basketball player
- Christopher Andersen (born 1949), American journalist and author
- Christoffer Andersen (born 1980), blues guitarist from Norway
