= Injury Time (radio series) =

- Genre: Sketch show
- Running time: 30 minutes
- Home station: BBC Radio 4
- TV adaptations: Who Dares Wins
- Starring: Robert Bathurst; Martin Bergman; Rory McGrath; Jimmy Mulville; Emma Thompson
- Written by: The cast; Douglas Adams; Clive Anderson; Owen Brenman; Stephen Fry; Griff Rhys-Jones
- Produced by: Geoffrey Perkins
- Original release: 1 August 1980 – 10 August 1982
- No. of series: 3
- No. of episodes: 18
- Opening theme: "You've Got My Number (Why Don't You Use It?)"

Injury Time is a radio comedy programme, broadcast on BBC Radio 4 during the summers of 1980, 1981 and 1982, with a 1982 New Year's Special

The show starred Robert Bathurst, Griff Rhys-Jones, Martin Bergman, Rory McGrath, Jimmy Mulville and Emma Thompson.

Sketches included Rory McGrath parodying Shaw Taylor in Police 5.
