= Leg wrestling =

Sport between two competitors

- First played: c. 8th century CE

Characteristics
- Contact: Yes
- Team members: No
- Mixed-sex: No (competition)
- Equipment: No needed, flat surface only

Presence
- Country or region: International
- Olympic: No

Leg wrestling (also spelled legwrestling), also known as Indian leg wrestling, is a traditional strength and balance game in which two participants side by side opposite directions on their backs on the ground attempting to flip each other over using their legs.

The game is played by hooking one leg around the opponent’s leg and using leverage, core strength, and timing to pull or turn the other player onto their back or side. Leg wrestling is commonly played informally among children, athletes, and military personnel, and is known in several countries under different names.

In Scandinavia, the game is traditionally known as rævkrok in Norwegian and rövkrok in Swedish. Both roughly translated to "ass hook". The game has associations with old Nordic strength games and folk traditions.

The game has no universally standardized rules, and local variations exist. In some countries, informal competitions and festival events are organized around the activity.

Although usually played recreationally, leg wrestling has occasionally been promoted as a competitive sport and appears in physical education, scouting activities, and traditional games festivals, including these being Gutniska lekar on Gotland, Sweden.

== See also ==
- Arm wrestling
- Toe wrestling
