= Morecambe and Wise: Bring Me Sunshine =

Bring Me Sunshine was originally a three-part retrospective in tribute to Eric Morecambe and was hosted by the comedian and author Ben Elton, who is a big fan of Morecambe and Wise; the first episode was screened on 14 May 1994, which would have been his 68th birthday and featured interviews with many people who had guest starred in The Morecambe & Wise Show during its run from 1968 to 1977 and also had a host of memorable clips from the shows. Those interviewed included John Thaw, Roy Castle who died a few months afterwards, Diana Rigg as well as comments and tributes from modern day double acts Hale & Pace and Fry & Laurie.

Such was the popularity of the show (which aired in a Saturday evening prime-time slot) that three further editions were hastily commissioned and shown on BBC1 but the three later additions did not include interviews, just classic clips. This meant that the duo, having last performed together in late 1983, made an unexpected and triumphant return to prime time television after a break of over 10 years. Ernie Wise was not asked to participate, which upset him; he was quoted as saying "...you'd have thought they'd have asked for my memories...". The BBC said they didn't want "Too many talking heads". However, the fact that Wise was recovering from a minor stroke he suffered just before Christmas 1993 might have been a factor in his exclusion.

The programmes did much to lift the profile of the double-act, and began a resurgence of interest in their work. In August 1998, Wise was asked to take part in the documentary Bring Me Sunshine: The Heart and Soul of Eric Morecambe. He agreed to do so but he was too ill by the time he was due to be interviewed in late 1998. He died on 21 March 1999.
