= Gloucester cheese =

English semi-hard cheese

Gloucester
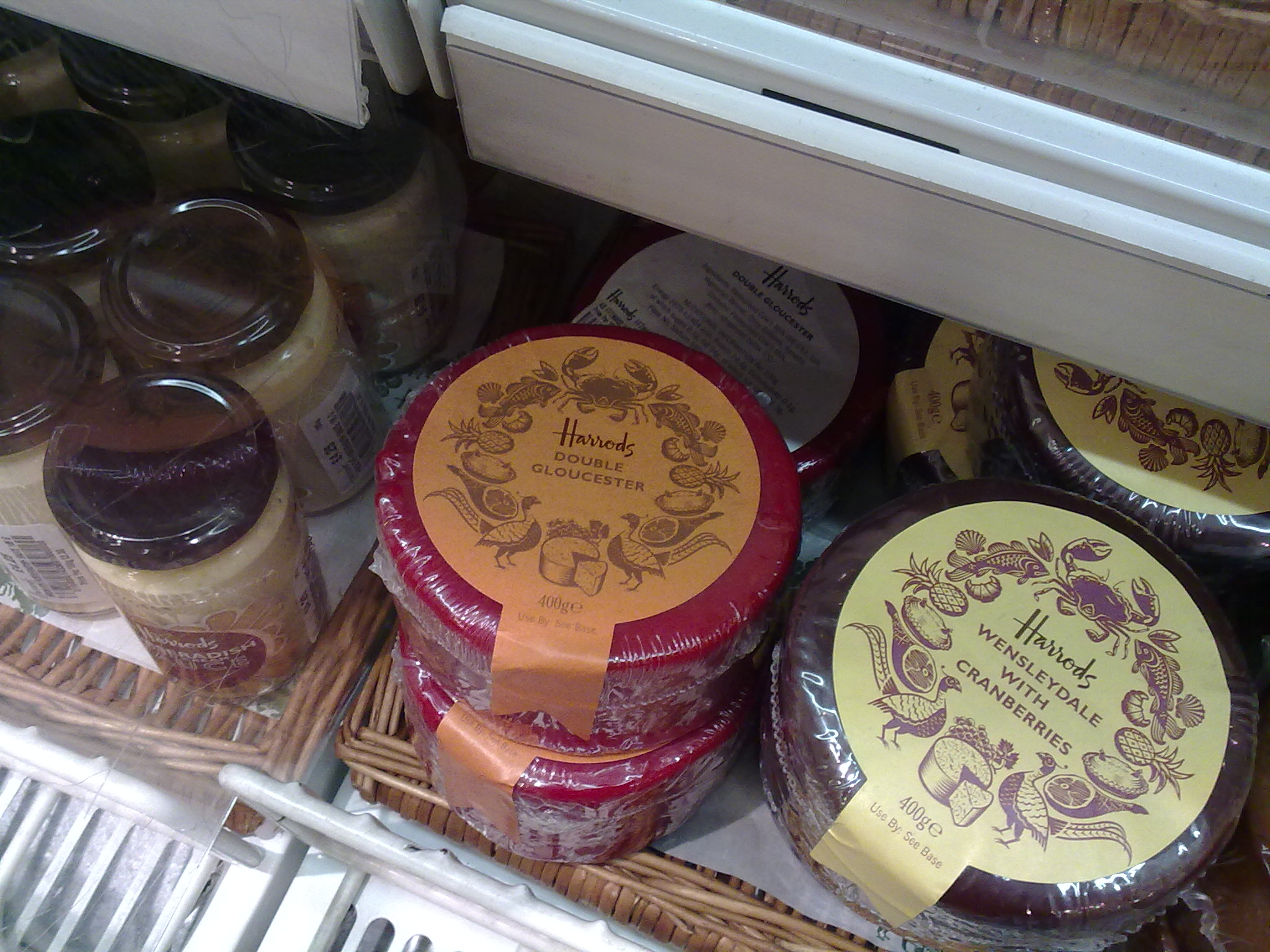
- Country of origin: England
- Region: Gloucestershire
- Source of milk: Traditionally from Gloucester cattle
- Pasteurised: Traditionally no
- Texture: semi-hard
- Aging time: 36 weeks
- Certification: Single Gloucester: PDO
- Named after: Gloucester

Gloucester is a traditional, semi-hard cheese which has been made in Gloucestershire, England, since the 16th century. There are two varieties of the cheese, Single and Double; both are traditionally made from milk from Gloucester cattle. Both types have a natural rind and a hard texture, but Single Gloucester is more crumbly, lighter in texture and lower in fat. Double Gloucester is allowed to age for longer periods than Single, and it has a stronger and more savoury flavour. It is also slightly firmer. The wild flower Galium verum, known colloquially as lady's bedstraw, was originally responsible for the distinctively yellow colour of Double Gloucester cheese.

In the United Kingdom today, Double Gloucester is more widely sold. Both types are produced in round shapes, but Double Gloucester rounds are larger. Traditionally whereas the Double Gloucester was a prized cheese comparable in quality to the best Cheddar or Cheshire, and was exported out of the county, Single Gloucester tended to be consumed within Gloucestershire.

Most Double Gloucester sold in UK supermarkets is slab cheese, made in large creameries operated by major dairy companies such as Dairy Crest. Supermarkets normally sell Double Gloucester under their own store brand. This version of the cheese is pasteurised, but not processed.

== Revival of Farmhouse Gloucester ==
Manufacture of traditional Gloucester cheeses from the Gloucester cow died out in the 1950s along with most of the Gloucester cattle. However, in 1973 Charles Martell managed to gather 3 Old Gloucester cows from the herd of less than 50 left in the county. A BBC TV series A Taste of Britain filmed his successful attempt to revive the tradition of farmhouse Double Gloucester that year. In 1978 Charles Martell went on to revive the lost single Gloucester cheese. Traditionally produced Gloucester cheese has been supported by the Slow Food movement since 2004. Single Gloucester cheese has Protected Designation of Origin and can only be made in Gloucestershire on farms with Gloucester cows. As of 2010 six cheese makers are producing this cheese.

== Variations ==
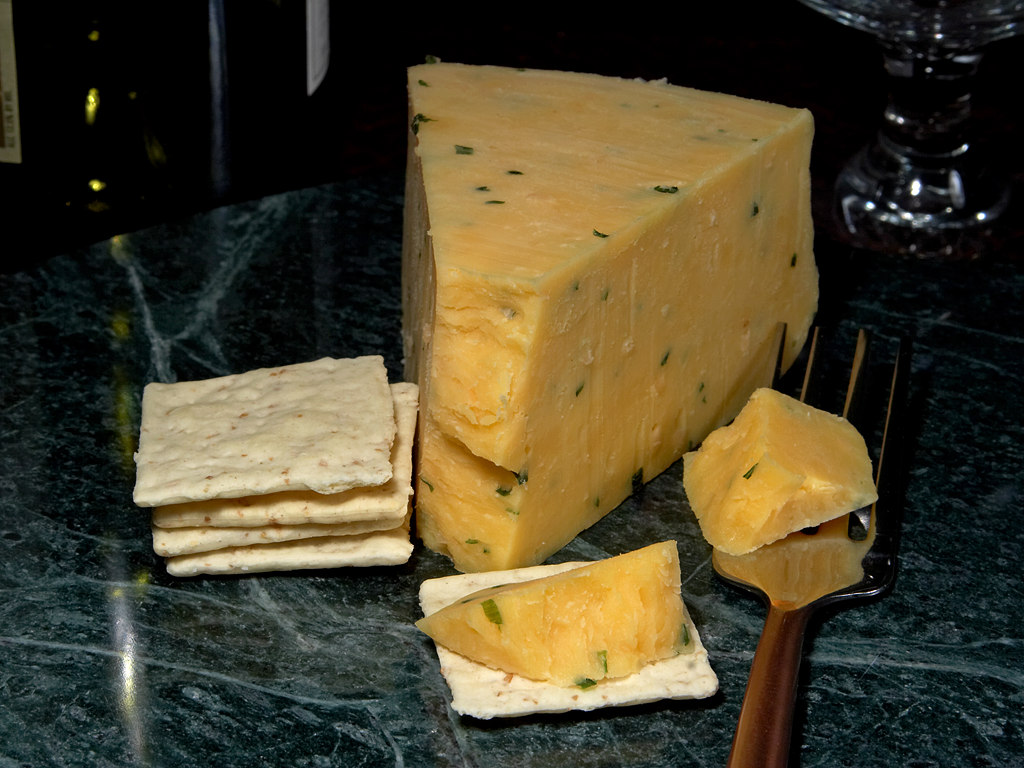
'Cotswold' with crackers

Double Gloucester is often blended with other ingredients. One variety made by blending with chives and spring onions has been marketed as Cotswold cheese, though this is not a traditional English cheese name. This cheese is supposedly coloured similarly to Cotswold stone.

Huntsman cheese is made with alternating layers of Double Gloucester and Stilton.

== Origin of double and single names ==
The reason for the two types of Gloucester cheese being called 'double' and 'single' is not known. The main theories are:

- because the creamy milk had to be skimmed twice to make the double variety, or
- because cream from the morning milk was added to the evening milk, or
- because a Double Gloucester cheese is typically twice the height.

== Cheese-rolling ==
A wheel of Double Gloucester cheese is also used every spring for the Cooper's Hill Cheese-Rolling and Wake, in which competitors chase the cheese down a steep Gloucestershire hillside; the first person to reach the bottom of the 50% gradient, 200 yards (180 m) slope wins the cheese. The wheel has a one-second head start. During its roll, it can accelerate to speeds of at least 70 mph under the effects of gravity.
