= Hat Trick Productions =

British independent TV and radio production company

Hat Trick Productions Limited
- Type: Limited company
- Industry: Television production
- Founded: 1986; 40 years ago
- Founders: Rory McGrath; Jimmy Mulville; Denise O'Donoghue
- Headquarters: London, England, UK
- Key people: Geoffrey Perkins (former director)
- Website: hattrick.co.uk

Hat Trick Productions Limited is an independent British production company that produces television and radio programmes, mainly specialising in comedy, based in London. The company's logo is depicted as an anthropomorphic rabbit pulling a man out of a hat instead of the other way around.

== History ==
Hat Trick Productions was founded in 1986 by Rory McGrath, Jimmy Mulville, and Denise O'Donoghue. Its first commission was Chelmsford 123, a situation comedy for Channel 4. Two years later, Geoffrey Perkins became company director, and helped to produce shows such as Father Ted, Whose Line Is It Anyway?, and Have I Got News for You. Perkins left the organisation in 1995, to become head of comedy for BBC Television.

In 2016 Hat Trick launched a joint venture with British television writer Jed Mercurio called HTM Television, with this production company responsible for dramas such as Bloodlands with James Nesbitt and DI Ray with Parminder Nagra.

In 2021 Hat Trick International struck a first look distribution deal with Cardiff Productions

== Current programmes ==
- Celebrity Mastermind (BBC One, 2019–2024; BBC Two, 2024–present)
- Have I Got News for You (BBC Two, 1990–2000; BBC One, 2000–present)
- Have I Got News for You (US) (CNN, 2024–present)
- Mastermind (BBC Two, 2019–present)
- Rich House Poor House (Channel 5, 2017–present)
- Smoggie Queens (BBC Three, 2024–present)
- Trigger Point (ITV, 2022–present)

== Former programmes ==
- The Armstrong & Miller Show (BBC One 2007–2010)
- Ballot Monkeys (Channel 4 2015)
- Bedtime (BBC One 2001–2003)
- The Big One (Channel 4 1992)
- Bike Squad (ITV 2008)
- Bloodlands (BBC One 2021–2022)
- Bodies (BBC Three 2004–2006)
- Boomers (BBC One 2014–2016)
- Boyz Unlimited (Channel 4 1999)
- The Brain Drain (BBC Two 1992–1993)
- Bromwell High (The Detour On Teletoon (All episodes) February 2005, Channel 4 (Episodes 1-6) August 2005, DVD (Episodes 7-13) 2006)
- The Bubble (BBC Two 2010)
- Case Sensitive (ITV 2011–2012)
- Chartjackers (BBC Two 2009)
- Cheap Cheap Cheap (Channel 4 2017)
- Chelmsford 123 (Channel 4 1988–1990)
- Chopratown (BBC One 2005)
- Confessions (BBC One 1995–1998)
- Critical (Sky1 2015)
- Derry Girls (Channel 4 2018–2022)
- Dinner Date (ITV 2010–2012, ITVBe 2014–2023)
- Doctor Thorne (ITV 2016)
- Drop Dead Gorgeous (BBC Three 2006–2007)
- Drop the Dead Donkey (Channel 4 1990–1998)
- Episodes (BBC Two 2011–2018, Showtime 2011–2017)
- Facejacker (Channel 4 2010–2012)
- Fairy Tales (BBC One 2008)
- The Fake News Show (Channel 4 2017)
- Father Ted (Channel 4 1995–1998)
- Flack (POP TV and Showtime On Demand 2019–2020)
- Fonejacker (E4 2006–2012)
- Game On (BBC Two 1995–1998)
- Game Show in My Head (CBS 2009)
- God on Trial (BBC Two 2008)
- Great Night Out (ITV 2013)
- Harry Enfield's Television Programme (BBC Two 1990–1992)
- Horrible Science (CITV 2015)
- How to Get to Heaven from Belfast (Netflix 2026)
- Hypothetical (Dave 2019–2022)
- If I Ruled The World (BBC Two 1998–1999)
- In Denial of Murder (BBC One 2004)
- It's Only a Theory (BBC Four 2009)
- Jeffrey Archer: The Truth (BBC One 2002)
- Kate & Koji (ITV 2020–2022)
- Kröd Mändoon and the Flaming Sword of Fire (BBC Two 2009, Comedy Central 2009)
- The Kumars at No. 42 (BBC Two 2001–2004, BBC One 2005–2006, Sky1 2014)
- Life Isn't All Ha Ha Hee Hee (BBC One 2005)
- Miss Marie Lloyd – Queen of The Music Hall (BBC Four 2007)
- Mutual Friends (BBC One 2008)
- Never Mind the Horrocks (Channel 4 1996)
- News Knight with Sir Trevor McDonald (ITV 2007)
- Norbert Smith – a Life (Channel 4 1989)
- Outnumbered (BBC One 2007–2014; 2016; 2024)
- The Omid Djalili Show (BBC One 2007–2009)
- Paul Merton: The Series (Channel 4 1991–1993)
- The Peter Principle (BBC One 1995–2000)
- Power Monkeys (Channel 4 2016)
- Revolting (BBC One 2017)
- The Revolution Will Be Televised (BBC Three 2012–2015)
- Room 101 (BBC Two 1994–2007, BBC One 2012–2018)
- Round the Bend (CITV 1989–1991)
- The Royal Bodyguard (BBC One 2011–2012)
- The Secret (ITV 2016)
- The Slow Norris (CITV 1995–1999)
- Small Potatoes (Channel 4 1999–2001)
- Some Girls (BBC Three 2012–2014)
- Spy (Sky1 2011–2012)
- Stephen (ITV 2021)
- Stuck (BBC Two 2022)
- The Suspicions of Mr Whicher (ITV 2011–2014)
- This is David Lander (Channel 4 1988)
- Trevor's World of Sport (BBC One 2003)
- Turn Back Time (BBC One 2006)
- The Waiting Game (BBC One 2001–2002)
- Warren (BBC One 2019)
- Whatever You Want (BBC One 1997–2000)
- Whose Line is it Anyway? (Channel 4 1988–1999)
- Whose Line Is It Anyway? (US) (ABC, 1998–2004; ABC Family, 2004–2007; The CW, 2013–2024)
- Whistle Through the Shamrocks (2021)
- Worst Week (CBS 2008–2009)
- The Worst Week of My Life (BBC One 2004–2006)
