= Jimmy Mulville =

British comedy writer and producer (born 1955)

- Born: James Thomas Mulville; 5 January 1955 (age 71); Liverpool, England
- Occupations: Actor; writer; comedian; producer
- Years active: 1983–present
- Spouses: Denise O'Donoghue (m. 1987, divorced): Karen Mulville
- Children: 4

James Thomas Mulville (born 5 January 1955) is an English actor, comedian, comedy writer, producer and television presenter. He is best known for co-founding (in 1986) the British independent television production company Hat Trick Productions with Denise O'Donoghue and Rory McGrath (who left in 1992). In 2003, Mulville and O'Donoghue, as co-founders of Hat Trick, were listed in The Observer as two of the 50 funniest people in Britain.

== Early career ==
Brought up in Walton, Liverpool, Mulville attended Alsop High School, a local comprehensive. He began his career as an actor and writer for the Cambridge Footlights, whilst reading French and Classics at Jesus College, Cambridge.

At Cambridge, Mulville met Rory McGrath with whom he both performed and wrote. He became president of Cambridge Footlights in 1977 and after graduating, went on to work for BBC Radio comedy for four years, producing shows such as Injury Time (1980–1982) and Radio Active, before moving to television in 1984 as script editor and producer of Alas Smith and Jones.

== TV appearances and radio broadcasts ==
He appeared in and co-wrote the cult TV show Who Dares Wins (1983–1988). He was one of the cast of the British comedy series The Steam Video Company (1984). He starred in the ITV sitcom That's Love in the 1980s, along with Diana Hardcastle and Tony Slattery.

He co-wrote and starred with Rory McGrath in the two series of Chelmsford 123, a comedy set in Roman Britain, broadcast on Channel 4 in 1988 and 1990. They also co-wrote the radio comedy Glompus Van Der Hloed's Tales From The Crypt, which starred Andrew Sachs, Mel Smith and Griff Rhys Jones, which aired on Capital Radio in the early 1980s and subsequently released in an abridged version as an album. He featured on the radio version, as well as the television pilot, of the UK improvisation show Whose Line Is It Anyway?, alongside Stephen Fry and Nonny Williams.

Mulville had a non-comic acting role in Alan Bleasdale's G.B.H. in 1991, playing a researcher hired by the lead character Michael Murray to trace his childhood nemesis. On radio, he appeared in the BBC Radio 4 comedy series Old Harry's Game (1995–2012) as Thomas Quentin Crimp; he and writer and co-star Andy Hamilton are old friends, having met at Cambridge, where they were at university with Rory McGrath, Clive Anderson and Griff Rhys Jones.

== Personal life ==
He has been married three times, with the first two marriages ending in divorce. He has four children, a step-daughter and three sons. His second marriage was to Denise O'Donoghue, with whom he continued to work after they divorced. In 1999 Mulville and O'Donoghue jointly received the BAFTA Alan Clarke Award for their creative contribution to television. His third wife is Karen Mulville, the co-founder of the retirement complex Auriens.

He is an Everton F.C. supporter. In 2004 he was awarded an honorary degree by the University of Liverpool.
