= Trevor Philpott =

British journalist and television reporter (1924–1998)

- Born: Trevor Philpott; 30 May 1924; Northampton, England
- Died: 29 July 1998 (aged 74); Winchester, England
- Occupations: Writer; broadcaster; director

Trevor Philpott (1924–1998) was a British journalist, writer and director. He was most known in the UK for his work on the TV shows The Philpott File (1969–1980), Man Alive (1965) and Tonight (1957).

He appeared on Desert Island Discs on 12 November 1973. His favourite track was 'Dusk', by Duke Ellington and His Famous Orchestra.
