= Denise O'Donoghue =

British television producer

Denise O'Donoghue, OBE (born 13 April 1955, in Wembley) is a British television production company executive.

== Early life ==
She attended the Catholic St Dominic's Convent Grammar School in north-west London (became St Dominic's Sixth Form College in 1979). She graduated in 1979 with a BA in Politics from University of York.

== Career ==
With Rory McGrath and Jimmy Mulville, she co-founded the independent British TV production company Hat Trick Productions in 1986. As a television producer, O'Donoghue has worked on shows such as the original British version of Whose Line is it Anyway?, and Have I Got News for You. McGrath left the company in 1992.

In 2003, O'Donoghue and Mulville, as the remaining co-founders of Hat Trick, were listed in The Observer as two of the 50 funniest people in Britain.

== Personal life ==
O'Donoghue married Mulville in 1987. They divorced in the mid-1990s but continued to work together. In 2006, she married Michael Holland, an oil shipping businessman, whose wife, Jane Attenborough (daughter of Richard Attenborough), their daughter Lucy, and his mother, Jane Holland, drowned in the tsunami in December 2004. He founded the charity Oil Aid.

She was appointed an OBE for services to television in the New Year Honours list of 1999.
