= Toe wrestling =

Style of wrestling using feet

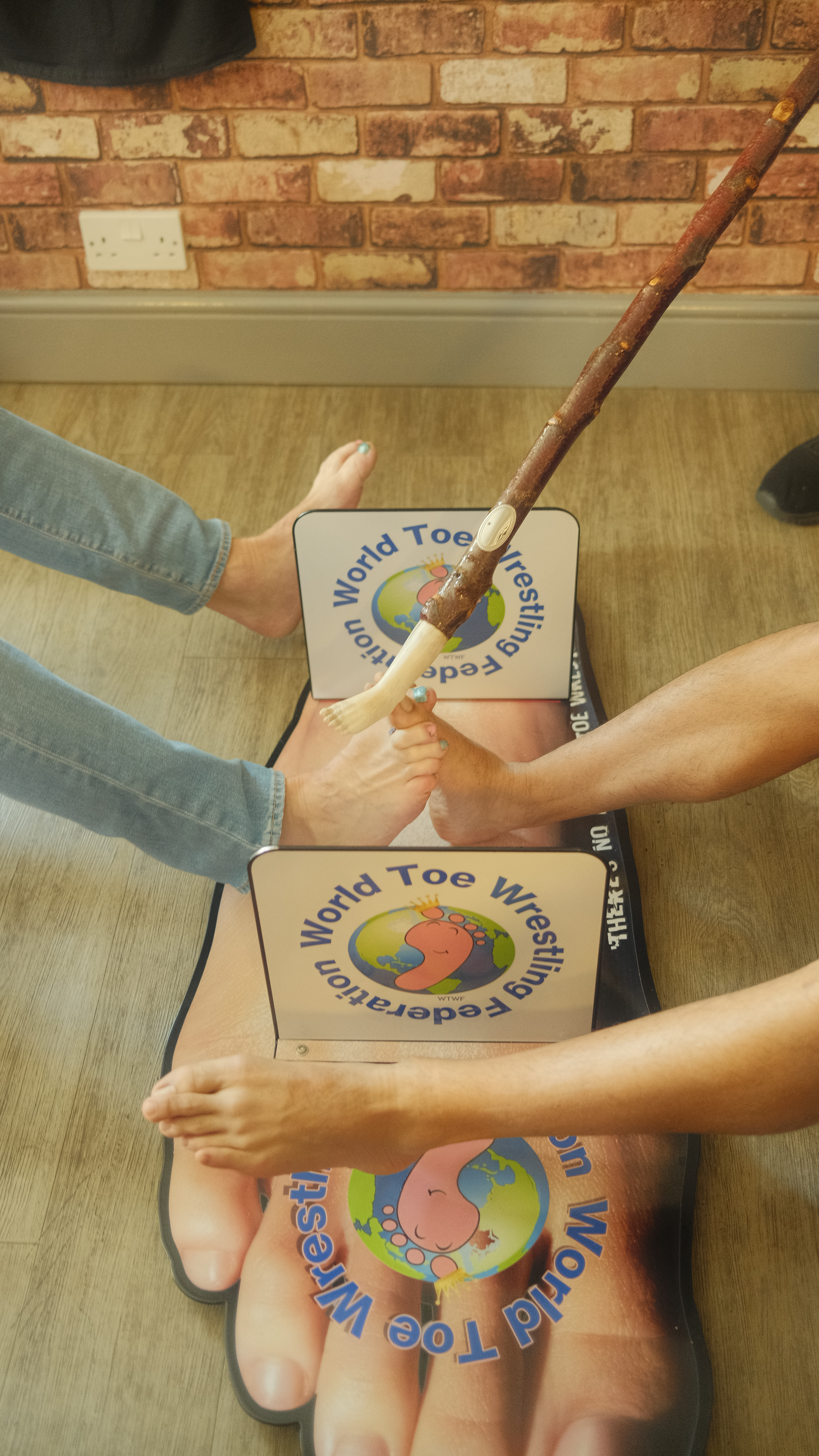
Toe wrestlers compete on a "toedium"

Toe wrestling is a sport in which two opponents lock toes and attempt to pin each other's feet down, similar to arm wrestling. The World Toe Wrestling Federation holds annual world championships in Derbyshire, England.

== History ==
Toe wrestling was created in 1974 by drinkers who were frustrated about the World Cup and wanted a sport in which the British would dominate. The year after the sport's debut competition, which was held in the Ye Olde Royal Oak Inn in Staffordshire, the winner was Canadian.

The World Toe Wrestling Championship is held annually in Derbyshire, England. The most prolific player is superchampion Alan "Nasty" Nash, with at least fourteen wins, called golden toes. Other successful toe wrestlers include Lisa "Twinkletoes" Shenton and Ben "Toe-tal Destruction" Woodroffe. Alan "Nasty" Nash and Ben "Toe-tal Destruction" Woodroffe, the co-owners of The World Toe Wrestling Federation, train regularly and have suffered toe wrestling injuries. Nash has broken at least four toes, and Woodroffe's ankle has snapped in two places. Woodruffe had his toenails surgically removed.

The Championship celebrated its fiftieth anniversary in 2024, welcoming international competitors from India, China, and the United States.

== Rules ==
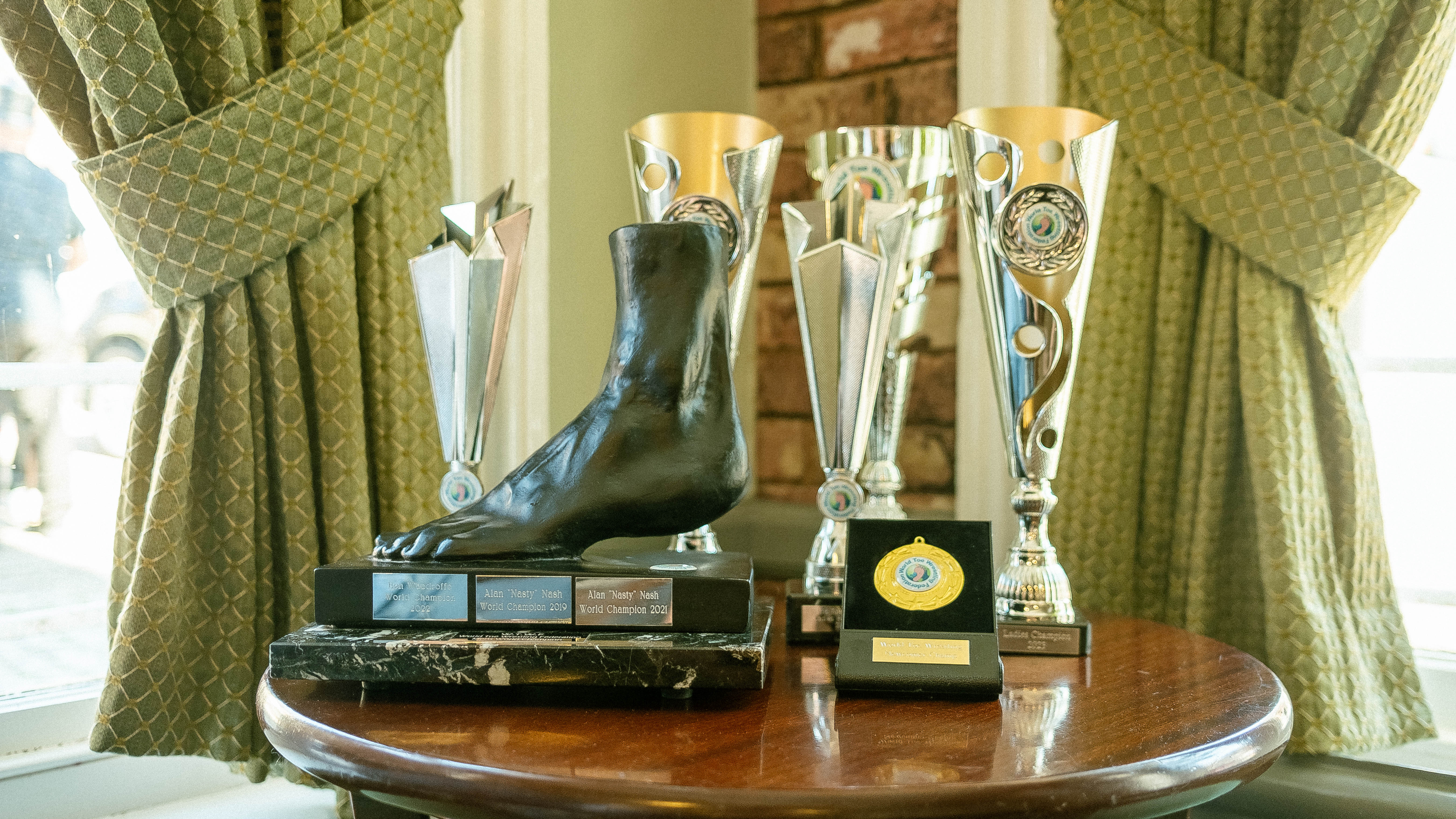
Collection of Toe Wrestling Trophies at The World Toe Wrestling Championship 2023

The official rules of toe wrestling include a ban on stimulants. Referees check feet for warts and infections before competition. Rounds begin when the referee shouts "toes away". Players link toes and each must keep their foot flat against their competitor's while attempting to bring the opposite player's foot to the wall of the "toedium". Three rounds are played, and wrestlers alternate feet each round: first right foot, then left, then right again if necessary.

== See also ==
- Thumb twiddling
- Thumb wrestling
- Leg wrestling
