= List of people from Gloucestershire =

A list of notable people from the county of Gloucestershire:

- Sean Arnold, actor
- Sir Robert Atkyns, baron of the Exchequer
- Sir Robert Atkyns, author of a history of Gloucestershire
- Thomas Aufield, Roman Catholic martyr
- Charles Bannister, actor and singer
- Steve Banyard, football commentator, lives in the Cotswolds
- Wayne Barnes, international rugby union referee
- John Bayliss, poet
- Joseph Bennett, music critic and librettist, born in Berkeley
- Siân Berry, politician and Green Party member
- John Biddle, Unitarian
- Hubert Cecil Booth, engineer and inventor, founder of Goblin Vacuum Cleaners
- Lorraine Bowen, singer and songwriter
- Matthew Boyce, cricketer
- Herbert Brewer, organist and composer, Gloucester Cathedral
- Edwin Beard Budding, inventor of the lawnmower
- John Canton, physicist
- Cornelius Cardew, composer, born in Winchcombe
- Johnny Coppin, folk musician and composer, lives in the county
- Ernest Cossart, Hollywood actor; brother of Gustav Holst
- P. J. Crook, artist, born and lives near Cheltenham
- William Davis, miner, shot dead by police during a miners' demonstration in Canada and commemorated by Davis Day
- Ian Dench, musician and songwriter
- Sir George Dowty, founder of Dowty Rotol
- David Drew, MP for Stroud
- Eddie "The Eagle" Edwards, born in Cheltenham
- Air Chief Marshal Sir Basil Embry
- Sir Martin Evans, winner of the Nobel Prize in Physiology or Medicine
- Mabel FitzRobert of Gloucester, heiress and wife of Robert, 1st Earl of Gloucester
- Winifred Foley, writer, best known for her autobiography A Child in the Forest
- Richard Freeman, judge
- Gabrielle Glaister, actress
- W. G. Grace, cricketer
- Christopher Gunning, composer
- Ivor Gurney, composer and poet
- Button Gwinnett, second of the signatories (first signature on the left) on the United States Declaration of Independence
- Sir Frederick Handley Page, aircraft designer, best known for WW2 aircraft, including the Halifax bomber
- Robert Hardy, actor
- Ricci Harnett, actor
- Sir Arthur Harris, head of RAF Bomber Command during WWII
- William Ernest Henley, poet, author of Invictus
- William Stephen Raikes Hodson, soldier and commander of Hodson's Horse during the Indian Mutiny
- Gustav Holst, composer, born in Cheltenham
- Imogen Holst, composer and conductor
- Lionelle Howard, silent era film actor, born in Cirencester
- Herbert Howells, composer
- Wilfrid Hyde-White, actor, born in Bourton-on-the-Water
- Edward Jenner, discovered vaccination, initially against smallpox, lived in Berkeley
- Brian Jones, ex-guitarist of the Rolling Stones
- Alex Kapranos, lead singer and guitarist for the band Franz Ferdinand
- Martin Kent ("Ace"), guitarist and vocals with Skunk Anansie, born in Cheltenham
- H. D. F. Kitto, classical scholar
- Laurie Lee, poet and author of Cider with Rosie and other autobiographical works
- Jackie Lewis, motor racing driver
- Thomas Linley the elder, composer
- David Loder, racehorse trainer
- Emma McClarkin, politician
- Joe Meek, 1960s pop record producer and pioneer, born in Newent
- Christopher Merret, physician and scientist
- Henry Miles, dissenting minister and writer on science
- Royce Mills, actor
- Ben Morgan, Gloucester and England Rugby player
- William Moseley, actor best known for Peter in The Chronicles of Narnia
- Richard O'Brien, of the Rocky Horror Show
- J. I. Packer, theologian
- Simon Pegg, actor and comedian
- Emily Pidgeon, athlete
- Dennis Potter, dramatist
- Cozy Powell, rock drummer, born in Cirencester
- Michael Praed, actor
- Zac Purchase, Olympic gold medallist
- Robert Raikes, founder of the Sunday School movement
- Scott Redding, British Superbike Champion 2019
- William Reynolds, footballer
- Frederick C. Roberts, cricketer
- Jeremy Dale Roberts, composer
- J. K. Rowling, author of the Harry Potter books
- Samuel Rudder, topographer, printer and antiquarian, born in Uley
- Robert Charles "Jack" Russell, former Gloucestershire and England cricketer, now an artist
- Frederick Sanger, double winner of the Nobel Prize for Chemistry, born in Rendcomb
- John Stafford Smith, composer of the tune "The Star-Spangled Banner"
- Jonathan Smith, novelist
- Tom Smith, lead singer of the rock band Editors
- Nathan Sykes, former member of The Wanted
- Bert Tayler, cricketer
- John Taylor, the "Water Poet"
- Kate Thornton, TV presenter born in Cheltenham
- Keith Tippett, pianist and improviser
- Edith Tolkien, née Bratt, wife of J. R. R. Tolkien
- FKA Twigs, singer, producer
- William Tyndale, Bible translator
- Thomas Twining, tea merchant, born in Painswick
- Abel Wantner (c. 1639–1714) Historian
- Christopher Warren-Green, violinist and conductor
- Oliver Weeks, composer and arranger
- Fred West, one of Britain's most notorious serial killers
- Sir Charles Wheatstone, physicist
- George Whitefield, preacher
- Richard Whittington, four times Lord Mayor of London, and inspiration for the pantomime character Dick Whittington
- Ralph Vaughan Williams, composer, born in Down Ampney
- Edward Adrian Wilson, Antarctic explorer
- James (Jemmy) Wood, banker
- James Wood-Mason, zoologist
- John Woolrich, composer, born in Cirencester
- Jimmy Young, singer and radio DJ, born in Cinderford

== See also ==
- List of freemen of the City of Gloucester
- Category:People from Gloucestershire
