= Hucclecote (parish) =

Civil parish in Gloucestershire, England

Coordinates: 51.857°N 2.199°W

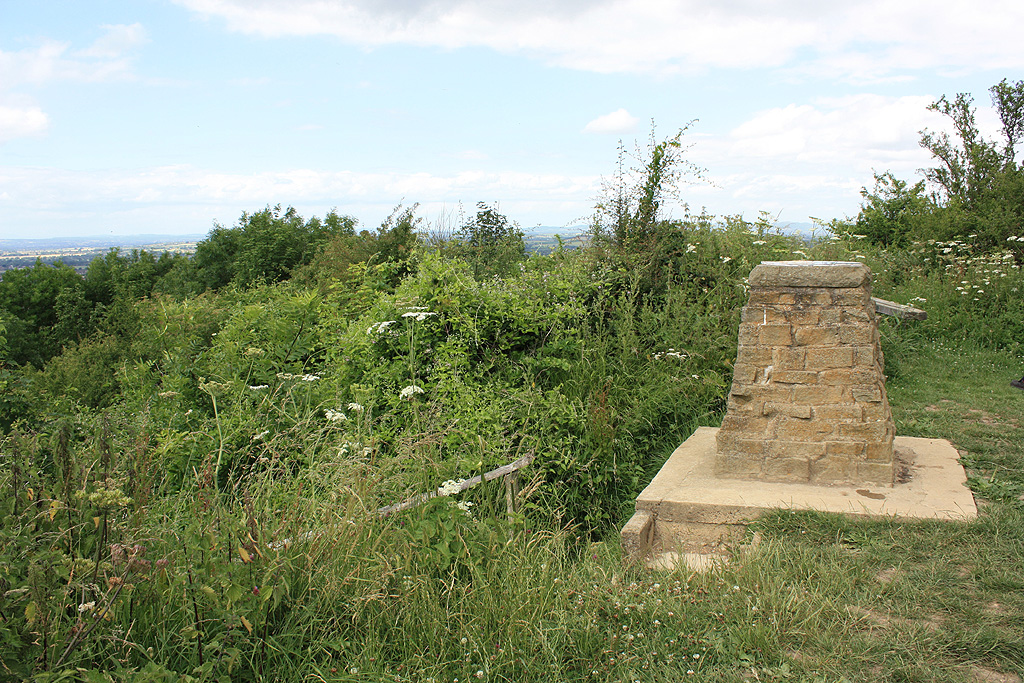
- Churchdown Hill Trig Point

- Location within Gloucestershire
- Population: 2,703 (2019)
- OS grid reference: SO864176
- Civil parish: Hucclecote
- District: Tewkesbury
- Shire county: Gloucestershire
- Region: South West
- Country: England
- Sovereign state: United Kingdom
- Post town: Gloucester
- Postcode district: GL3
- Police: Gloucestershire
- Fire: Gloucestershire
- Ambulance: South Western
- UK Parliament: North Cotswolds
- Website: Parish Council

Hucclecote is a civil parish in the Tewkesbury district, in the county of Gloucestershire, England. It lies just west of Brockworth and about 3 miles (5 km) south-east of Gloucester city centre. As of 2019, the parish had a population of 2,703.

21st-century housing in the south of the parish is part of the Coopers Edge development.

Following boundary changes in 2024, for Westminster elections the parish is part of the North Cotswolds constituency.

The parish is separate from the Gloucester suburb of Hucclecote which lies west of the parish on the other side of the M5 motorway.
