= Coopers Edge =

Suburb in Gloucestershire, England

Coordinates: 51°50′33″N 2°10′55″W

- Suburb
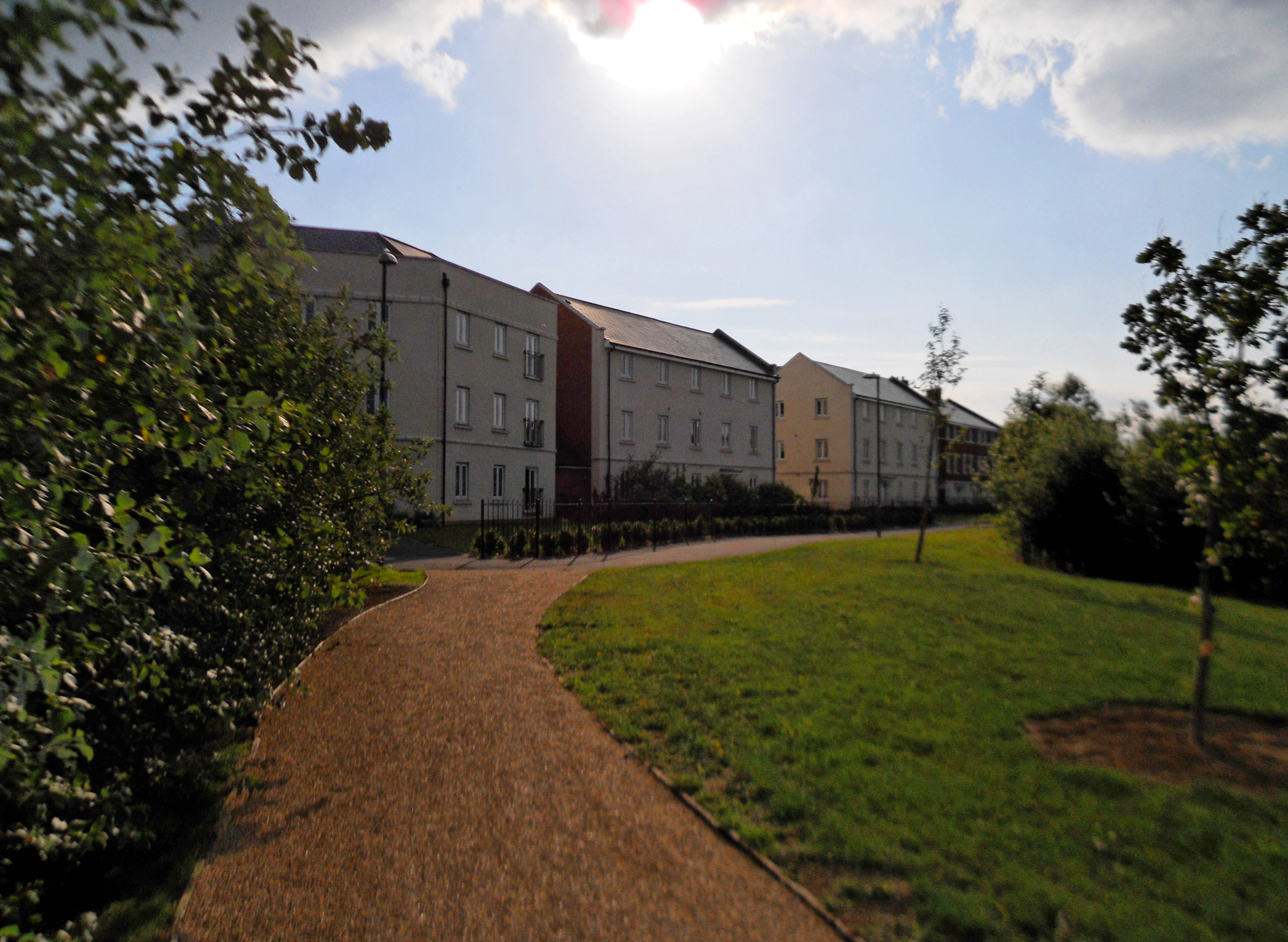

- Location within Gloucestershire
- Population: 6,908 (ward, 2021)
- OS grid reference: SO8716
- Civil parish: Brockworth; Upton St Leonards
- District: Gloucester
- Shire county: Gloucestershire
- Region: South West
- Country: England
- Sovereign state: United Kingdom
- Post town: Gloucester
- Postcode district: GL4
- Dialling code: 01452
- Police: Gloucestershire
- Fire: Gloucestershire
- Ambulance: South Western
- UK Parliament: North Cotswolds

Coopers Edge is a residential suburb on the edge of Gloucester, England, about 3 miles (5 km) south-east of the city centre and 6 miles (10 km) south-west of Cheltenham. It was developed on land at Brockworth that was formerly the Gloster Aircraft Company factory and airfield, and takes its name from Cooper's Hill, further to the south-east.

Development of the land commenced in 2006, initially for 1900 houses and community facilities.

== Governance ==
The area spans three civil parishes: the south-east sector is in Brockworth parish, while the south-west sector (with the school and community centre) is in Upton St Leonards, and the northern part is in Hucclecote. For the next tier of local government, Upton St Leonards is part of Stroud district and the other areas are part of Tewkesbury district. At the top tier, the whole is within the area of Gloucestershire County Council.

For Westminster elections, following boundary changes which came into effect in 2024, Coopers Edge is within the North Cotswolds constituency.

== Transport ==
Coopers Edge is less than 2 miles from the junction of the M5 motorway and the A417, via a link road which also serves Gloucester Business Park. The A417 leads to Swindon and connects to the A40 to Oxford.

The area is served by Stagecoach West, with direct buses to Cheltenham, Stroud and Gloucester.

== Community ==
There is a community centre, @The Edge Community Centre, which consists of a community cafe, sports hall, meeting rooms and garden.

The neighbourhood also has a sports centre, home to Barnwood United Football Club, which was completed in 2021, although was not opened until February 2024 due to issues with the Section 106 agreement between the developers and Tewkesbury Borough Council, and lack of interest from local groups to manage the facilities.

A primary school with the capacity for 420 students was opened in September 2011, and was the first school in the county to be managed as an Academy.
