= John P. Connolly (businessman) =

English businessman (1950–2025)

- Born: John Patrick Connolly; 29 August 1950; Manchester, England
- Died: 22 December 2025 (aged 75)
- Education: St Bede's College, Manchester
- Known for: Senior partner and CEO, Deloitte; Founder, Cogital
- Title: Chairman, G4S; Chairman, Amec Foster Wheeler
- Board member of: G4S; Amec Foster Wheeler; Cogital; Great Ormond Street Hospital
- Spouse: Odile Lesley Griffith (m. 1992)
- Children: 2

John Patrick Connolly (29 August 1950 – 22 December 2025) was an English businessman. He was chairman of Eisner Advisory Group LLC, Interpath Advisory, Stonehage Fleming and Metric Capital Partners. He was chairman of two FTSE-100 companies, G4S and Amec Foster Wheeler. Prior to that he was senior partner and chief executive of Deloitte in the UK, and global managing partner and global chairman of Deloitte until his retirement from the firm in June 2011.

== Early life ==
John Connolly was born in Manchester on 29 August 1950. His father was John Connolly and his mother, Mary Morrison. He was educated at St Bede's College, Manchester.

== Career ==
Connolly ran an office for Deloitte in the Middle East, was partner-in-charge of its Leeds office and a regional managing partner. He was also head of the London office and UK managing partner.

He became embroiled with the Barlow Clowes affair. He was heavily criticised by the accountancy profession in 1995 for his role when the report into the scandal was published.

Connolly served as the chairman of G4S from January 2012 until May 2021. He also served as the chairman of Amec Foster Wheeler.

In October 2016, Connolly founded Cogital (now Azets), a British multinational accounting and business services company, with the financial backing of the private equity firm Hg Capital.

== Philanthropy and equine interests ==
Connolly served as the chairman of the Great Ormond Street Hospital until July 2019.

He was also the owner of four horses at a stable near the South Coast.

== Personal life and death ==
Connolly married Odile Lesley Griffith in 1992. He had a son and a daughter.

Connolly died from complications of cancer on 22 December 2025, at the age of 75.
