= GFM =

GFM may refer to:

== Science and technology ==
- Gas gangrene or gas forming myonecrosis
- GitHub Flavored Markdown, a variant of Markdown
- GoFundMe, a popular crowdfunding website

== Other uses ==
- Gesellschaft für Musikforschung (GfM), the German Musicological Society
- GFM cloche, a defensive armament on the Maginot Line
- Gloucester FM, an English radio station
- Gruyère–Fribourg–Morat railway, a Swiss railway
- Government-furnished materials, to fulfill contract obligations under US Federal Acquisition Regulations
