= Hucclecote =

Suburb of Gloucester, England

Coordinates: 51.85°N 2.18°W

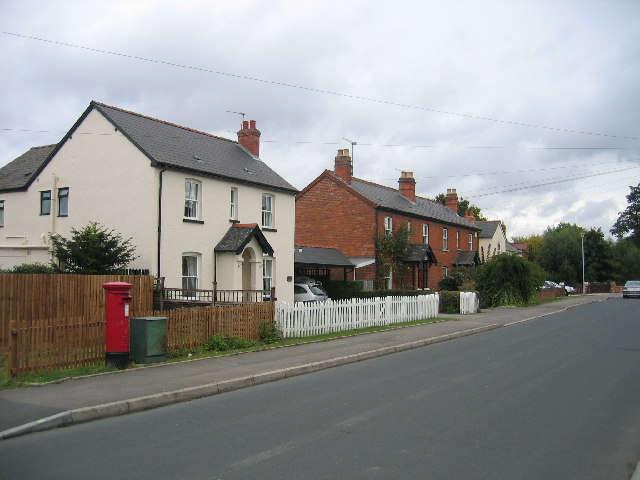
- Kingscroft Road in Hucclecote

- Location within Gloucestershire
- Population: 8,826 (2011)
- OS grid reference: SO873168
- Shire county: Gloucestershire
- Region: South West
- Country: England
- Sovereign state: United Kingdom
- Post town: GLOUCESTER
- Postcode district: GL3
- Dialling code: 01452
- Police: Gloucestershire
- Fire: Gloucestershire
- Ambulance: South Western
- UK Parliament: Gloucester and Tewkesbury

Hucclecote is a suburb in Gloucestershire, United Kingdom, comprising a ward (population 8,826) in the City of Gloucester. It is located on the periphery of the city, between Barnwood and Brockworth, along Ermin Way, an old Roman road connecting Gloucester with Cirencester and the Cotswolds.

== History and background ==
Hucclecote has been settled since ancient times, and a Roman villa dating from the second or third century AD has been found at Hucclecote. By the time that the Domesday Book was written in 1086, the village comprised 16 households. Administratively, it was recorded as lying within the hundred of Dudstone, in the county of Gloucestershire.

Later, Hucclecote was a hamlet in the ancient parish of Churchdown.

Hucclecote was a small village until development began prior to the outbreak of World War II in 1939. Development was halted during the war and the area was bombed by the Luftwaffe due to the aircraft factories and other industrial facilities in the area, which were originally within the boundary of Brockworth. Due to redistricting, the airfield from which the world's first jet fighter, the Gloster Meteor, took off for test flights is now within the boundary of Hucclecote. The area bordering Brockworth is currently undergoing redevelopment, with the derelict land that formerly housed the airfield and factory having made way for Coopers Edge, a housing development of 1,900 homes, as well as shops and a school. The nearby Gloucester Business Park currently has a Tesco Supermarket, a Premier Inn, and many office buildings, with restaurants and other retail facilities currently being added.

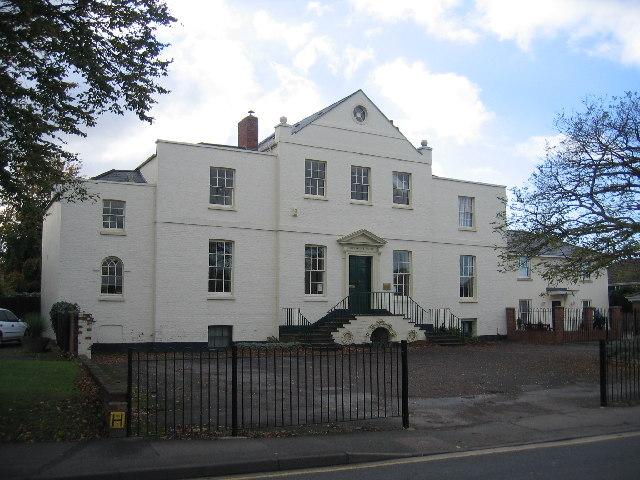
Hucclecote Court, currently the offices of a local firm of solicitors

Ermin Way through Hucclecote was a major trunk route until the construction of the Brockworth Bypass in 1995. Until the construction of the Severn Bridge in 1966, this was a strategic route from the south of England to south Wales, as the lowest bridge crossing of the River Severn was at Gloucester.

Hucclecote is split into two parts; with the dividing line being the M5 Motorway bridge. The part to the west of the bridge, and thus closest to Gloucester, is the larger part, and falls under Gloucester City Council, while to the east of the bridge, the Parish of Hucclecote is part of Tewkesbury Borough Council.

== Toponymy ==
Possibly, though very doubtfully, Hucclecote derives from Welsh: 'Uchel'+'coed' = high wood (cf Wotton & Barnwood) meaning that the name 'Hucclecote' could be rendered as 'tall trees' or 'lofty woods'.

A "cote" is: A small shed or shelter for sheep or birds. [Middle English, from Old English.] cote

2 (k t). tr.v. cot·ed, cot·ing, cotes Obsolete. To go around by the side of; skirt.

Eilert Ekwall gives the meaning as The COT of Hucel's people.

== Floods of Summer 2007 ==
During the floods of Summer 2007, Hucclecote escaped the damage on the scale that afflicted other parts of Gloucester. However, on Friday 20 July 2007, a few roads were submerged, which prevented access to many homes, and were blocked off by the Police. During the period, many homes were without water for two weeks, and some were also without electricity.

The Dinglewell area was badly affected, with one house receiving 18" of brook water throughout the lower floors.

== Amenities ==
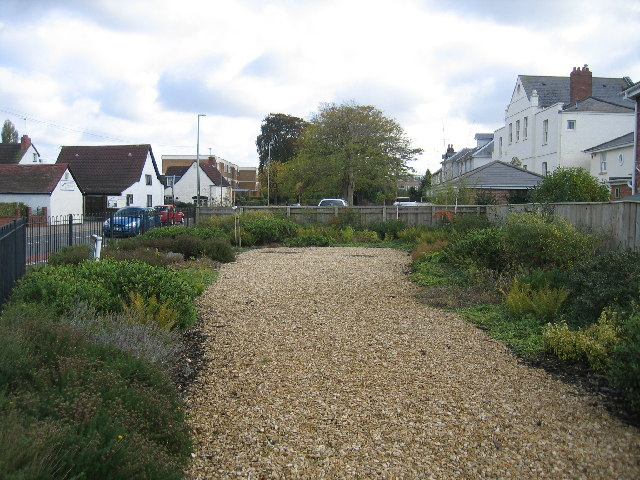
Hucclecote Millennium Garden by the side of Ermin Way/Hucclecote Road

Hucclecote has many locally owned shops and two pubs; The Royal Oak and The Wagon & Horses, both operated by national chains. There's also the Community Centre Club Bar. National brands such as The Co-operative and Lloyds Pharmacy have branches in the village. There are three schools in Hucclecote: Hillview primary school and Dinglewell Infants and Juniors.

In 2018, over 10,000 visitors are expected to the Hucclecote Show, a fayre held in George V playing fields and run by the Hucclecote Community Association.

== Economy ==
The average household income was £27,040 in 2012.

== Notable residents ==
The antiquary Richard Furney lived in Hucclecote.

The noted amateur rose grower Conway Jones (1846–1929) lived at Blenheim House.

The local solicitor, amateur botanist, poet and bibliophile John Wilton Haines (1875–1960) was a friend of the Dymock poets and his archive includes correspondence with various twentieth century literary figures.
