= North Cotswolds =

UK Parliament constituency (since 2024)

- County constituency for the House of Commons
- Boundary of North Cotswolds in South West England
- County: Gloucestershire
- Electorate: 70,915 (2023)
- Major settlements: Bourton-on-the-Water, Brockworth, Chipping Campden, Churchdown, Minchinhampton, Moreton-in-Marsh,Stow-on-the-Wold

Current constituency
- Created: 2024
- Member of Parliament: Geoffrey Clifton-Brown (Conservative)
- Seats: One
- Created from: The Cotswolds (part), Stroud (part), Tewkesbury (part)

North Cotswolds is a constituency of the House of Commons in the UK Parliament. Created as a result of the 2023 review of Westminster constituencies, it was first contested at the 2024 general election, when it was won by Conservative Geoffrey Clifton-Brown, who had represented Cirencester and Tewkesbury then The Cotswolds since 1992.

== Constituency profile ==
North Cotswolds is a constituency in Gloucestershire. It includes some of Gloucester's outer suburban villages (Churchdown, Brockworth, Hucclecote and Hardwicke) and a large rural area to the east of the city covering much of the Cotswolds. Settlements in the constituency include the towns of Minchinhampton, Painswick, Northleach, Stow-on-the-Wold, Moreton-in-Marsh and Chipping Campden, the village of Bourton-on-the-Water and many smaller villages.

The Cotswolds is a range of rolling hills designated as a National Landscape. The area is popular with tourists for its picturesque stone-built villages; Bourton-on-the-Water receives around 300,000 visitors each year, almost one hundred times the resident population, and Arlington Row in Bibury is depicted on the inside cover of British passports. The constituency is generally affluent with low levels of deprivation and house prices are higher than regional and national averages.

North Cotswolds has a large retired population and a low proportion of young adults. In general, residents are well-educated, more religious and more likely to be homeowners compared to the rest of the country. Household income is high and the child poverty rate is low. A high proportion of residents work in professional occupations, particularly in the manufacturing and tourism sectors, and a low percentage claim unemployment benefits. White people made up 96% of the population at the 2021 census.

At the local council level, the west of the constituency (Minchinhampton and Painswick) is represented by Green Party councillors, the centre (Brockworth, Churchdown and Northleach) by Liberal Democrats and the east (Stow-on-the-Wold, Moreton-in-Marsh and Chipping Campden) by Conservatives. An estimated 52% of voters in North Cotswolds supported remaining in the European Union in the 2016 referendum, higher than the nationwide figure of 48%.

== Boundaries ==
Map of boundaries from 2024

The constituency was formed from a split of the former Cotswolds constituency, with the other half reformed as part of the new South Cotswolds constituency. The constituency is composed of the following wards (as they existed on 1 December 2020):

- The District of Cotswold wards of: Blockley; Bourton Vale; Bourton Village; Campden & Vale; Chedworth & Churn Valley; Coln Valley; Ermin; Fosseridge; Moreton East; Moreton West; Northleach; Sandywell; Stow; The Rissingtons.
- The District of Stroud wards of: Bisley; Hardwicke; Minchinhampton; Painswick & Upton.
- The Borough of Tewkesbury wards of: Badgeworth; Brockworth East; Brockworth West; Churchdown Brookfield with Hucclecote; Churchdown St. John’s; Shurdington.

The seat covers northern parts of the Cotswolds area of outstanding natural beauty. It comprises the following areas:

- Just under half (by electorate) of the abolished constituency of The Cotswolds, including the towns of Chipping Campden, Moreton-in-Marsh, Stow-on-the-Wold, Bourton-on-the-Water and Minchinhampton
- Communities lying between Cheltenham and Gloucester, including Badgeworth, Brockworth, Churchdown, Coopers Edge and Shurdington, transferred from Tewkesbury
- Northernmost parts of the Stroud constituency, including Bisley, Hardwicke and Painswick

== Members of Parliament ==
Election	Member	Party
2024	Geoffrey Clifton-Brown	Conservative

== Elections ==
=== Elections in the 2020s ===
General election 2024: North Cotswolds
Party	Candidate	Votes	%	±%
Conservative	Geoffrey Clifton-Brown	17,426	34.7	−24.6
Liberal Democrats	Paul Hodgkinson	14,069	28.0	+10.0
Labour	Anna Mainwaring	8,593	17.1	+0.6
Reform	Jason Preece	6,502	12.9	+12.6
Green	Chloe Turner	3,191	6.4	+0.6
Independent	Jean Blackbeard	448	0.9	N/A
Majority		3,357	6.7	−36.6
Turnout		50,229	69.3	−2.3
Registered electors		72,513		
Conservative hold		Swing	−17.3	

=== Elections in the 2010s ===
2019 notional result
Party	Vote	%
Conservative	30,140	59.3
Liberal Democrats	9,143	18.0
Labour	8,391	16.5
Green	2,944	5.8
Brexit Party	175	0.3
Turnout	50,793	71.6
Electorate	70,915	
