= Samuel Rudder =

Samuel Rudder (c. 1726 – 15 March 1801) was a Gloucestershire topographer, printer and antiquarian who was born at Uley and baptised 5 December 1726. He was the son of Roger Rudder (c. 1687–1771), a shopkeeper and pig-killer. Rudder ran a printing and bookselling business in Cirencester in the 1750s and wrote and published several works on the history of Gloucestershire.

Samuel married Mary Hinton (1724–1800) on 22 June 1749, the daughter of a maltster, and it has been speculated that Mary might have been related to the Cirencester printer Thomas Hinton.

== A New History of Gloucestershire ==
Rudder's A New History of Gloucestershire was compiled from printed questionnaires, which he said made him very troublesome to his friends, Sir Robert Atkyns' Ancient and Present State of Glostershire (1712), and an unpublished manuscript history of the City of Gloucester by the Rev. Richard Furney.

The work was well received by critics and Horace Walpole described it as "the most sensible history of a county that we have had yet". The work had taken him twelve years to complete during which time a competing work had been published and Rudder was forced to deny rumours that he had abandoned the work. His later works on Cirencester (1780) and Gloucester (1781) were extracted from his New History. Some of the other works published by Rudder were of a less serious nature.

== Selected publications ==
- The History of Fairford Church, in Gloucestershire. (1763)
- A New History of Gloucestershire. (1779) (free download)
- The History and Antiquities of Cirencester. (1780)
- The History and Antiquities of Gloucester. (1781) (free download)

== Other works printed by Rudder ==
- By an impartial hand. The Cirencester contest. : Containing all the letters, papers, verses, songs, &c. relative to the election, that have been printed on all sides, from the beginning of the opposition to this time. And some originals. Connected and disposed in the same order they came out; and each paper connected with the preceding one, in such manner as to make the whole a compleat narrative of the most material passages on that occasion. With an introductory preface, and a few remarks and observations. c. 1750.
- Anonymous. A new fortune-book. Being a new art of courtship, open'd for young men and maids, widows widowers and batchelors, instructions for young men and maids. c. 1770
- Anonymous. The new art and mystery of gossiping. Being a genuine account of all the women's club's in and about the city and suburbs of London, with the manner of their club orders. c. 1770.
- Graham, Dougal. The comical sayings of Pady from Cork. Being an elegant conference between English Tom, and Irish Teague. c. 1780.

== See also ==
- Thomas Rudge
