= Hardwicke, Stroud =

Village in Gloucestershire, England

Coordinates: 51°48′50″N 2°17′5″W

Hardwicke
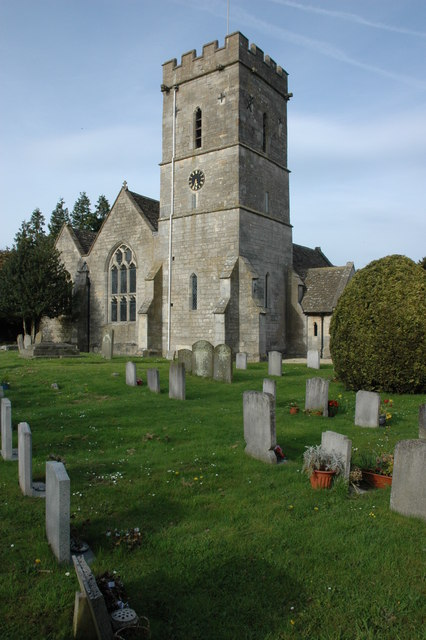
- Saint Nicholas's Church, Hardwicke

- Location within Gloucestershire
- Population: 4,395 (2021 Census)
- District: Stroud
- Shire county: Gloucestershire
- Region: South West
- Country: England
- Sovereign state: United Kingdom
- Post town: Gloucester
- Postcode district: GL2
- Police: Gloucestershire
- Fire: Gloucestershire
- Ambulance: South Western
- UK Parliament: North Cotswolds

Hardwicke is a village in the Stroud District of Gloucestershire, England. It is located to the south of the city of Gloucester. The population of the village taken at the United Kingdom Census 2011 was 3,901.

With its name deriving from the Old English heorde wic, "herd [tending] settlement", farming is still the major industry of the parish. Hardwicke was once renowned for its ciders and cheese, this may have led to its survival during the battle for Gloucester in the Civil War – neither side wanted to damage a source of much appreciated sustenance.

Though there is a typical village green and pond on Green Lane, along with some of the village's oldest cottages, there was never a distinct centre to the village and other parts have a distinct "Victorian" feel. Added to this are the newer developments of the 1970s and 1980s, which have gradually become contiguous with the Quedgeley district of Gloucester to the north.

The village had three public houses, 'The Pilot' (on the Gloucester & Sharpness Canal), 'The Cross Keys' (now demolished) 'The Morning Star' (now a private house, Morning Star Cottage) next door to 'The Starting Gate' (formerly 'The Morning Star', on Bristol Road (B4008)). The latter has now closed and been refitted and opened as a One Stop in 2015. There is also a branch of The Royal British Legion, a village hall and a shop.

In the centre of the village is the Hardwicke Parochial School, a Church of England school that teaches children from the ages of four to eleven.

Planning proposals have been put forward to Stroud District Council to build 1200 new dwellings on the South side of the parish.

== Hardwicke Court ==
Hardwicke Court has since the late 18th century been the principal Gloucestershire seat of the Lloyd-Baker family. The extant house was designed in neo-Classical style by Robert Smirke in 1817–19, although it retains a canal feature from the early 18th-century gardens of the Trye family. The house and gardens are occasionally open to the public in the summer. It is a grade II* listed building.

== Governance ==
An electoral ward in the same name exists. The ward starts in the north west at Elmore, passes by Harwicke and ends in the south west at Haresfield. The total ward population taken at the 2011 census was 4,783.

== Religion ==
Saint Nicholas Church, a grade I listed building, is located on Church Lane in the oldest part of the village. There are records of a chapel on the site since 1092, although that may have been built over an Anglo-Saxon church foundation. The present church, founded in the 1200s, contains ancient to past lords of the manor and their families and some ancient gravestones. It boasts a fine lych gate that was built as the village war memorial. It has experienced certain restoration over the years, but still performs regular Church of England Sunday services and annual flower shows.

== Sport ==
Hardwicke has a number of local youth football teams collectively called Hardwicke Rangers FC. The club was founded in 1990 by local parents of the village who wanted a team for their children to compete in. As of 2007, the club had over three hundred members, making it one of the largest in Gloucestershire. There are teams for different age groups that range from under 7s to under 16s. Each team plays in their corresponding age group in the Gloucester and Stroud Youth Leagues. In 2006–07, Hardwicke Rangers Youth FC entered its first girls’ team.

Hardwicke Cricket Club runs several senior sides and has a successful youth section (Hawks). The club enters league and cup competitions for all teams organised by the Stroud District Cricket Association. In 2007, the senior teams were bolstered by the introduction of a 2nd XI. The club is run by committee which meets throughout the year.

== Media ==
The village has a free magazine, "Hardwicke Matters" (started in 1989), that is delivered to 2,500 households and business in the parish and beyond.

Severn FM is internet broadcast from Hardwicke.

== Historical ==
=== Hardwicke Reformatory ===
Hardwicke Reformatory, established in 1852, has been claimed as the first approved school for boys in the world. The local squire, T. B. Lloyd Baker, was one of its founders. The Reformatory attracted attention from other parts of Britain and the rest of the world. The boys, mainly from inner cities, were given an education and worked within the parish if they were old enough. Many of them gained honours during the First World War and a roll of honour is on display in the church. The Reformatory closed in 1922 and the building was neglected after the World War Two and was demolished in 2001.

=== Madam's End Farm ===
The story of the farm is that Henry VIII was on one of his processions around the country when he came to Hardwicke late in the afternoon. His wife, Anne Boleyn, declared that she was too tired that day to face the pomp and ceremony of Henry's entry into the city of Gloucester. Thus they ended their journey for the day by imposing themselves on the farmer.
