= Gloucester Business Park =

Business park in Gloucester, England

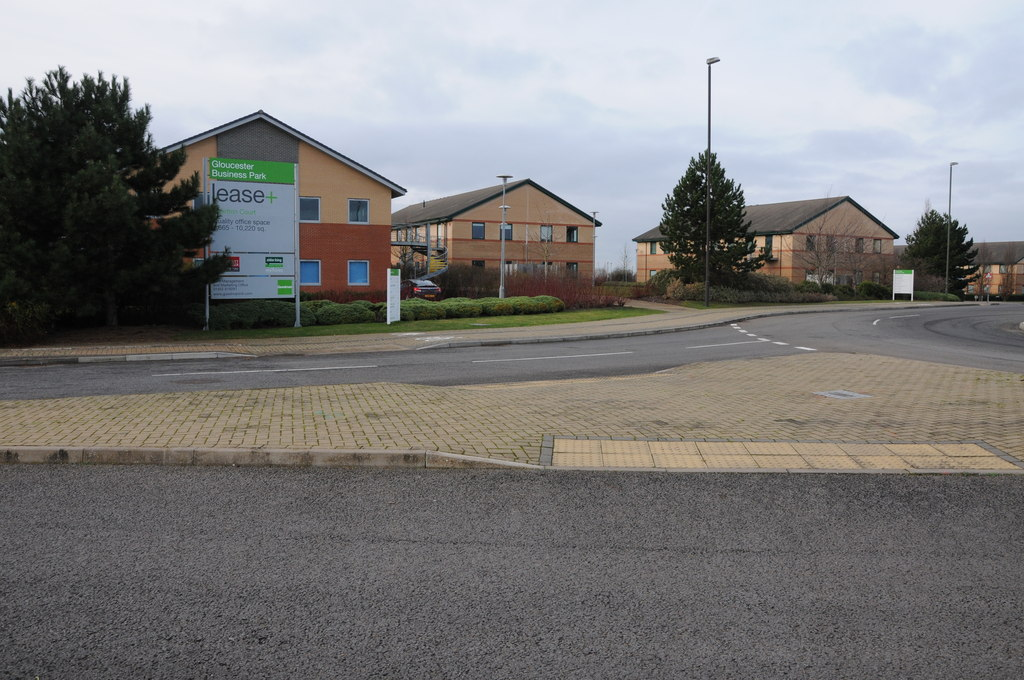
- Gloucester Business Park in 2013

- Location within Gloucester
- Location: Brockworth, Gloucester
- Coordinates: 51.844°N 2.173°W
- Opening date: 2000
- Owner: Straight Trading Company
- Size: 276 acres (112 ha)
- Website: www.gloucesterbusinesspark.co.uk

Gloucester Business Park is a business park situated in Brockworth on the outskirts of Gloucester, England, with close links to the M5 and A417. The Park has received an award from the British Association of Landscape Industries.

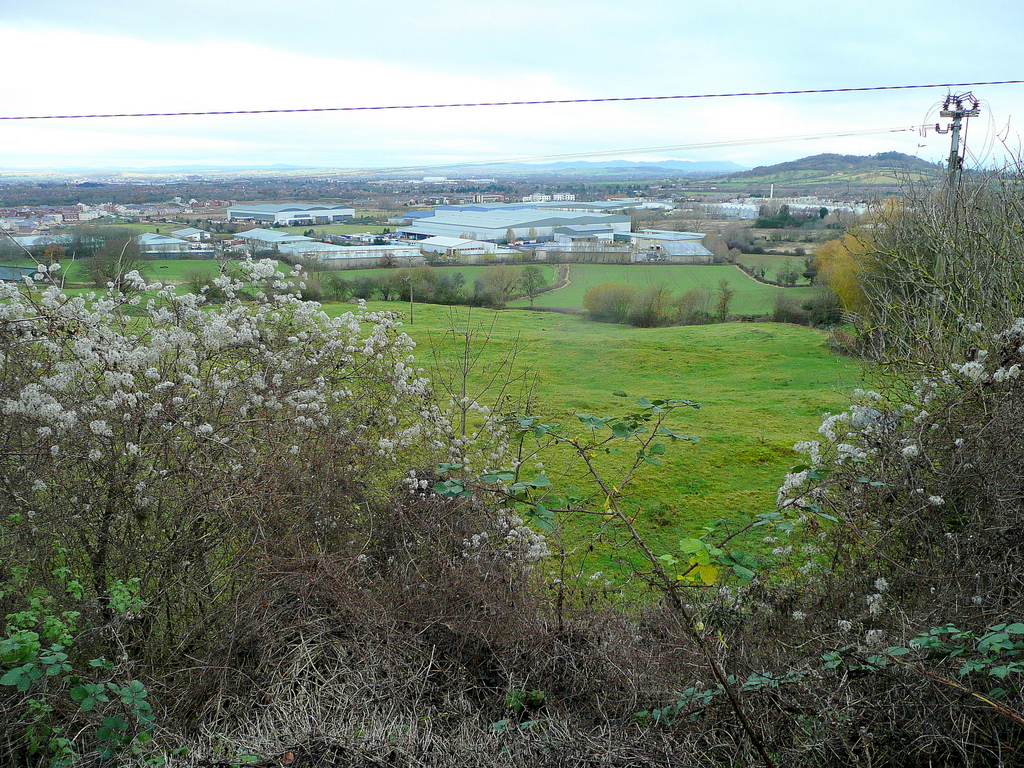
View over Gloucester Business Park in 2011

== History ==
Gloucester Business Park was formerly the factory and test airfield for the Gloster Aircraft Company, which built the Hawker Hurricane during the 1940s and the Gloster Javelin during the 1950s. The airfield ceased to be operational in 1962, and in 1964, the site became a trading estate. In the late 1980s, the trading estate closed and in the 1990s, it was then redeveloped by Arlington into the Gloucester Business Park.

On 1 July 2022, Straight Trading Company announced the acquisition of the park for £130 million.

== Tenants and facilities ==
The current tenants of the business park include: Lockheed Martin, CGI, BAE Systems, Digital Intelligence, the NHS, Ageas, Ultra Electronics, Wynne Jones, Laithwaites, Partnerships in Care, SHS Group, Influit, Vitruvius, Baxter Healthcare, LivaNova, Mears Group, VWS Westgarth, Capula, Q&M Services, Willis Moss, TBS Engineering, Dowty Propellers, G-TEM, DHL, Tomcat, Springfast, EIG and Azets.

There is also a retail and leisure section within the park which includes:

- The Whittle Inn (a restaurant owned by Brewers Fayre)
- Costa Coffee
- David Lloyd Leisure
- Greggs
- Premier Inn
- Subway
- Tesco (Extra store)

== Transport ==
As of October 2025, bus routes serving the park include the Number 8 and 66.
