= Frederick Roberts (cricketer, born 1862) =

English cricketer and umpire

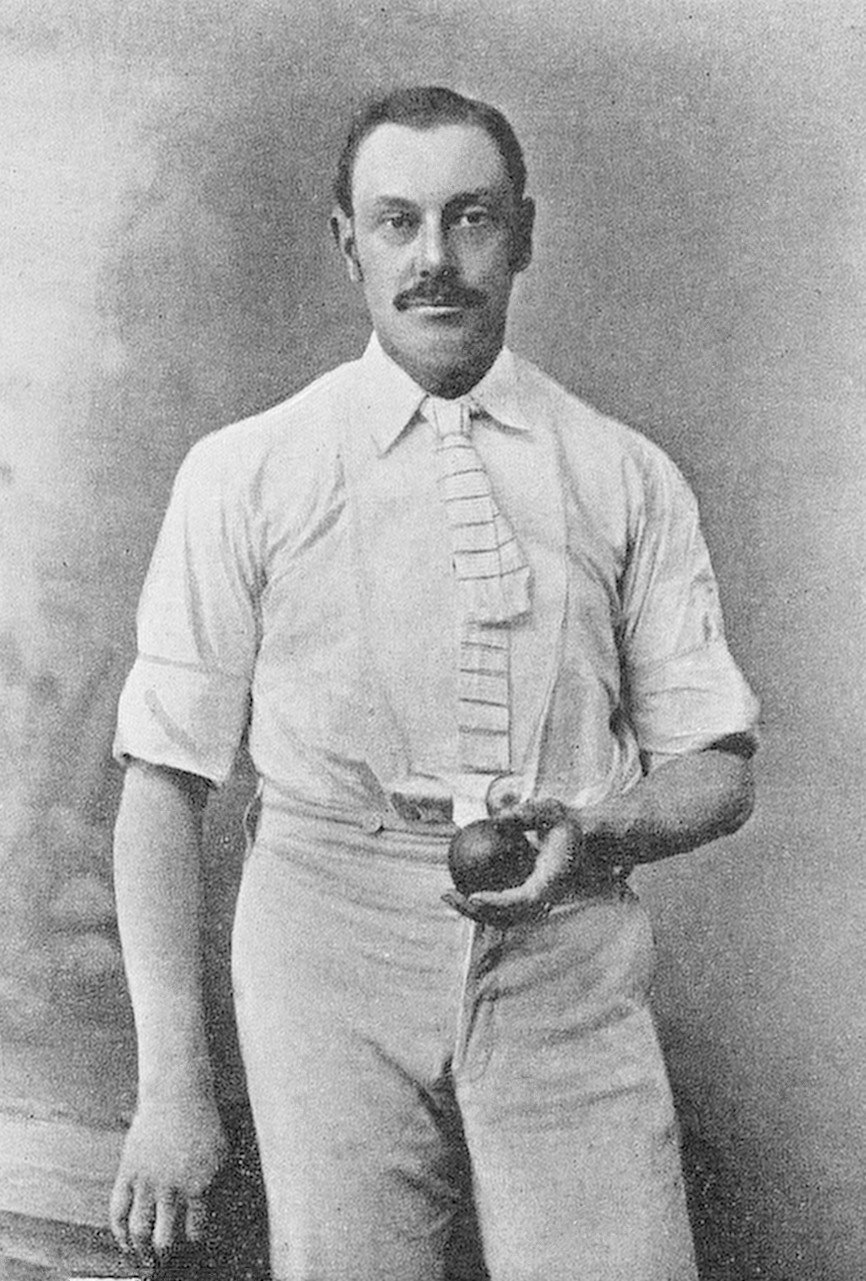

Personal information
- Full name: Frederick George Roberts
- Born: 1 April 1862; Mickleton, Gloucestershire, England
- Died: 7 April 1936 (aged 74); Bristol, England
- Batting: Left-handed
- Bowling: Left-arm fast

Domestic team information
- Years: Team
- 1887–1905: Gloucestershire

Career statistics
Competition	First-class
Matches	261
Runs scored	1,927
Batting average	7.38
100s/50s	0/0
Top score	38
Balls bowled	52,251
Wickets	970
Bowling average	21.96
5 wickets in innings	62
10 wickets in match	8
Best bowling	8/40
Catches/stumpings	97/–
- Source: CricketArchive, 26 September 2012

Frederick George Roberts (1 April 1862 – 7 April 1936) was an English cricketer and umpire who played first-class cricket for Gloucestershire from 1887 to 1905.

Roberts made his debut for Gloucestershire against Yorkshire in July 1887. The left-handed cricketer appeared in 211 matches for his county. His best bowling performance was 8–40 in a match versus Kent in May 1897. After his playing career had ended, Roberts became an umpire and officiated in 201 first-class matches between 1906 and 1923
