= Thomas Hinton (printer) =

Printer

Thomas Hinton was a printer in Cirencester who produced the first edition of the Cirencester Post or Gloucestershire Mercury in about October or November 1718. He is known to have been active as a printer in the town between 1709 and 1724. The Cirencester printer Samuel Rudder was married in 1749 to a Mary Hinton, and it has been speculated that Mary may have been related to Thomas Hinton.
