= Severn FM =

Coordinates: 51.81206°N 2.29797°W

England
- Broadcast area: Gloucester, UK
- Frequency: N/A Internet

Programming
- Format: Talk, Music, Sport, Local & Worldwide interest

Ownership
- Owner: Ringtone.net Ltd

History
- First air date: 18 June 2011

Links
- Website: www.severnfm.com

Severn FM is an internet radio station in the United Kingdom, which started broadcasting online in June 2011, and officially launched from its studio in Hardwicke on 3 December 2011 with the Severn Bore Breakfast Show, the launch coincided with its first 28-day RSL broadcast on 87.9 FM. The brainchild of Andy Clarke (Managing Director of South Gloucester Media CIC and Ringtone.net Ltd) who used his skills gained as a mobile network consultant, it initially followed the standard community radio model but has evolved along the way under the leadership of Andy and his Board of Directors (Barry Kirby, Caro Kingsnorth and Fr Andrew James) along with the presenters and other volunteers who form part of this growing and evolving South Gloucester "Community Project".

Severn FM is a 24/7 Internet Radio Station broadcasting on the internet.

== About the station ==
Severn FM is a registered trademark of Ringtone.net Ltd which has owned the brand since concept in 2011. It was licensed to South Gloucester CIC from August 2011 to March 2013 when then CIC was put into liquidation. Since March 2013 it has been operated by Ringtone.net Ltd from its new studio in Hardwicke, Gloucestershire.

== Programming ==
Severn FM provides a wide range of programmes including news, sport, interviews, chat and music. These are all produced by presenters in Gloucester and around the UK. It broadcasts 24 hours a day with program's such as "The Mystery Train", "Keepin it Country", "The Encyclopedia of Rock", "The Blues Hour", "Dance Attack", "Greet the Week", "Monkey Madness with Paul & Jools", "The Saturday Showcase", "The Severn Bore Breakfast Show" and many more. From 2012 Severn FM also linked up with Gloucester City AFC as part of its sports coverage to broadcast live match commentaries from the football club's fixtures. In June 2014, The Spanish Show "Extraños en la noche con Luis Cebrian" is also broadcast (simulcast) on 22 FM stations throughout Spain. Classic American Top 40 airs on Sunday afternoons.

== Technical ==
=== FM transmission ===
During the December 2011 RSL the coverage area reached as far as central Cheltenham, Stroud, Coleford and Michael Wood services on the M5. This far exceeded the anticipated range of Hardwicke, Quedgeley, Kingsway, Elmore, Haresfield, Whaddon, Brookthorpe & Epney.

=== Online 24/7 ===
Severn FM broadcasts its output across the world 365 days a year, 24 hours a day on its website and mobile portal. Severn FM has two streams 128Kbs and 64Kbs which are both operated and managed in house by Severn FM. There is a mobile portal.

== Closing ==
On the 19th March 2024, Andy Clarke announced that Severn FM was to close on the 30th June 2024. He has closed his limited company Ringtone.net Ltd, that has been operating Severn FM for the past 11 years, due to the impacts of IR35 and the current financial climate. Andy will continue to fund the operation until it closes on the 30th June 2024. Andy expressed this was done with a very heavy heart.
