= Witcombe Festival =

Annual music festival in Gloucestershire, England

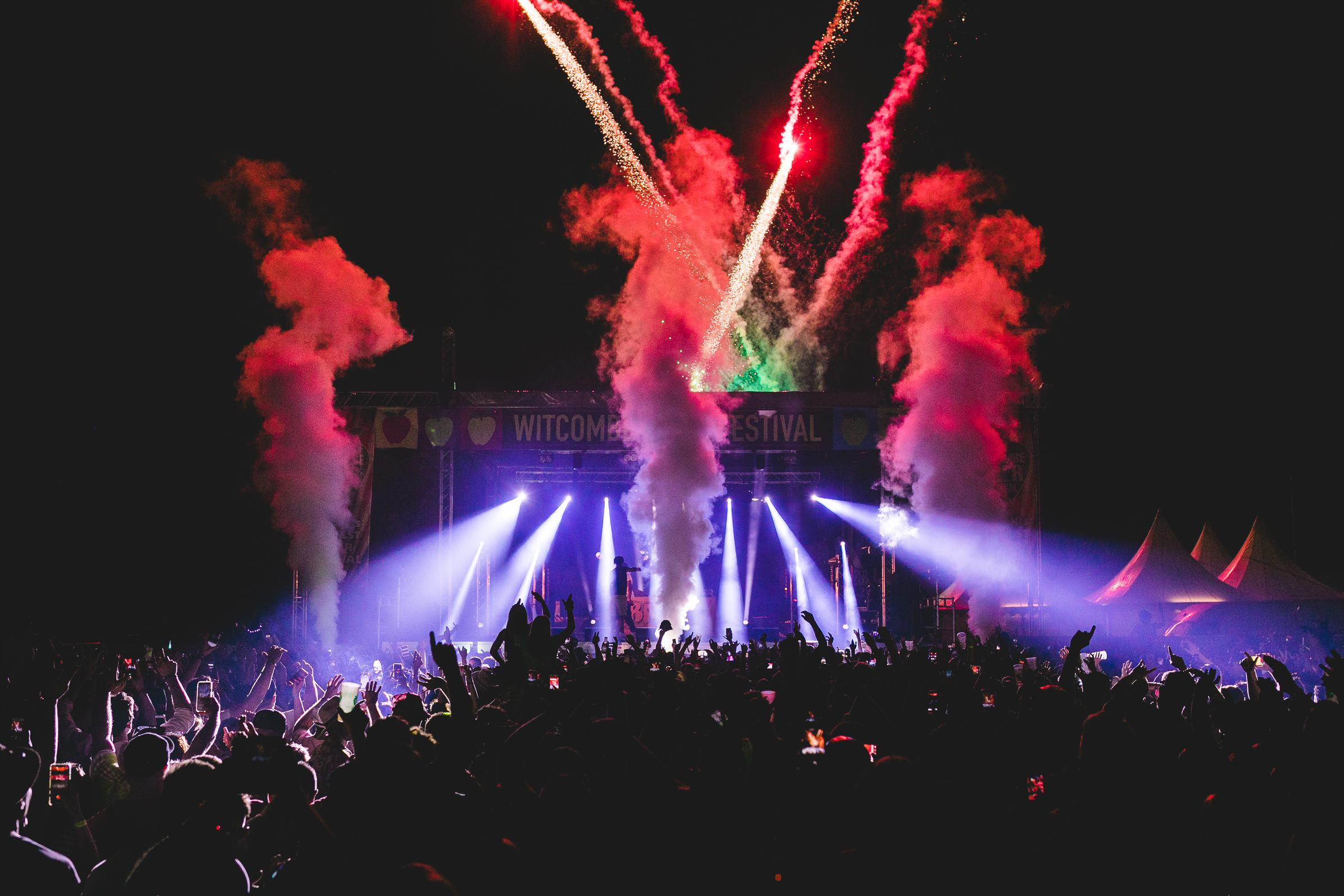
- The festival's main stage in August 2019
- Genre: Music Festival
- Frequency: Annually, on the August Bank Holiday weekend
- Locations: Brockworth, Gloucester, England
- Years active: 2012–present
- Founder: Joe Pointon
- Attendance: 17,500 (2019)
- Website: witcombefestival.co.uk

Witcombe Festival is an annual music festival held in Brockworth, Gloucestershire, over the August Bank Holiday weekend. Previously known as Witcombe Cider Festival the festival dropped the word cider from the title to become Witcombe Festival in spring 2020. As well as music, the three-day festival has it roots deep in cider. The festival consists of four stages and had been headlined by; Rag'n'Bone Man, Chase & Status, Bugzy Malone, Sean Paul, Craig David, Rudimental, Basement Jaxx, Tinie Tempah, John Newman, Annie Mac, Dizzie Rascal, Plan B, Sigma, Ella Eyre, Example, Wiley, Heather Small, Lethal Bizzle, Tinchy Stryder. The festival is partnered with charity Rugby For Heroes for whom Nick Knowles is an ambassador.

== History ==
The very first Witcombe Cider Festival took place at Witcombe Cricket club on Saturday 25 August 2012. 200 cider and music fans gathered to enjoy a selection of Gloucestershire ciders and local bands. The festival was headlined by X Factor contestant Kitty Brucknell.

- 2013 a new licence was granted at fields at the foot of the cheese rolling hill. The festival featured 19 live acts over the weekend. Saturday 24 August 2013 acts; Juey, Damon T, Prime Position, Little Victories, Hired Guns, The Me! Me! Me's? Check da Cone, Swift Manoeuver, My Design. Sunday 25 August acts 2013 acts; Alec Fullerton, The Black Feathers, Oui Legionnaires, The Vast, Stress Echoes, The Scout Killers, The Lost Gonzos, BBC's The Voice Smith & Jones, Charlie Baxter. As well as 8 local Gloucestershire ciders.
- 2014 Festival had over 30 different ciders from the best local brewers. The mainstage featured 20 live acts over the weekend including; Goldie Lookin Chain, Sonique, Scratch Perverts, Duke, Reeps One, Ball-Zee, Matt Bond, Josh Flowers & The Wild, Son of Jack, Normanton Street, Check da Cone, Charlie Baxter, Emi McDade, Blossom Calderone, Ethemia, Smith & Jones, Michigan Avenue, King Solomon.
- 2015 Headlined by Tinchy Stryder on Saturday 29 August 2015 and Heather Small on Sunday 30 August 2015.
- 2016 The 5th Witcombe Cider Festival. Headlined on Saturday 27 August 2016 by Lethal Bizzle, supported by The Artful Dodger and N-trance. Sunday 28 August headlined by former BBC Radio 1 dj Judge Jules, supported by Duke and The Happy Mondays tribute band.
- 2017 The godfather of grime, Wiley headlined Saturday 26 August 2017 and renowned festival headliner Example, headlined Sunday 27 August 2017.
- 2018 Saw the festival move to its new site on Brockworth Road, Brockworth, having out grown the previous site on Painswick Road, Brockworth. The festival was headline by Ella Eyre on Saturday 25 August 2018 and supported by MNEK. Sunday 26 August 2018 was headlined by Sigma and supported by ShifyK3y and DJ Luck & MC Neat.
- 2019 Friday night 23 August 2019 was kicked off with a high energy Drum & Bass set from DJ Bison and headlined by Faithless, Saturday 24 August 2019 headlined by Plan B, with support from Sub Focus, Yungen, Shy FX, DJ Yoda, Lisa Maffia. Sunday 25 August 2019 was headlined by Dizzee Rascal, supported by legend David Rodigan, DJ Luck & Neat, General Levy, Ex The Wanted front man Max George, Preditah.
- 2020 lineup is yet to be announced. The Witcombe Festival management team cancelled the 2020 festival due to the Covid-19 Pandemic.
- 2021 Friday 27 August headlined by Basement Jaxx supported by DJ Luck & MC Neat, Artful Dodger (duo), Louis Capaldi. Saturday 28 August headlined by John Newman (singer) supported by DJ EZ, Andy C, Joel Corry. Sunday 29 August headlined by Tinie Tempah supported by Annie Mac, Raye, Nathan Evans (singer). The craft stage was introduced this year featuring acoustic acts. The organisers gave away 500 free tickets to NHS staff. Witcombe Festival voted best for dance
- 2022 Sean Paul, Craig David, Rudimental to headline Witcombe Festival, with support from Sigala, Bru-C, Wes Nelson, HRVY, Gentlemen's Dub Club, DJ Luck and MC Neat, James Haskell, Ellie Sax and Sweet Female Attitude Nominated as Best Small Festival 2022
- 2023 Rag'n'Bone Man, Chase & Status, Bugzy Malone headlined, with support from DJ Fresh, Venbee, Not3s, Tom Zanetti, Bad Boy Chiller Crew, A Little Sound, Arielle Free, Charlie Sloth, Kele Le Roc, DJ Luck & MC Neat. Nominated for Best Small Festival 2023
- 2024 - Cancelled due to the "Cost of living crisis", not enough tickets were sold to make the event commercially viable.
