= Gloucester FM =

English radio station

Coordinates: 51.8575°N 2.2394°W

Gloucester FM (which describes itself on air exclusively as GFM) is a community radio station in Gloucestershire. It broadcasts countywide on 96.6FM FM, Mobile and Online.

The stations strapline is 'Serving the Community', Gloucester FM is the only local radio station in the City of Gloucester providing music, news, information & advice. GFM is the only station in Gloucester where all programmes are broadcast from Gloucester, 24 hours-a-day 365 days-a-year.

Gloucester FM is a 'not-for-profit organisation'. All of the station's presenters and behind the scene staff are volunteers.

Presenters working on the station include: Jerry 'the hippo' Hipkiss (Weekday Breakfast), Fredlocks (Drivetime), Carol Francis (Community Link Show) DJ Cage (Weekday Afternoons), Rich Edwards (Monday Evenings) JJ Watkins (Saturday Lunchtimes), Daddy English (Saturday afternoons) Rico (Showtime) Leon Brown ( Northern Soul Wednesday Evenings).

Former presenters include Shaun Moore.

Gloucester FM's presenter led programming starts from 8am-1am (Weekdays), 7am-1am (Weekends).

The stations studio's are based in the Barton and Tredworth Trust Centre, Gloucester.

Sky News Radio provide the station with National News Bulletins [Weekdays & Weekends], Local News is written and produced from the GFM Studios [Weekdays]. GFM also provides up-to-date Caribbean news headlines alongside local and national UK news.

== News Team ==
- Carol Francis
