= Richard Furney =

English Anglican priest (1694–1753)

Richard Furney (1694-1753) was an Anglican priest and antiquary.

== Life ==
Furney was born in Gloucester and was educated at Oriel College, Oxford, graduating B.A. in 1715 and M.A. He was ordained in 1718 and became curate at St Michael, Gloucester. He was master of The Crypt School in Gloucester from 1719 to 1724. He held livings at Doynton near Bristol (1720-27), Houghton (1727-29), Cheriton (1729-53) and Tichborne. He served as Archdeacon of Surrey from 1725 until his death on 17 February 1753. Despite his association with Hampshire and Surrey, he purchased an estate in Hucclecote, Gloucestershire, where he was living at the time of his death.

His antiquarian interests were predominantly the history of Gloucestershire and ecclesiastical history. He left a number of manuscripts, including Abel Wantner's drafts for a history of Gloucestershire, but published nothing. He was a correspondent of Thomas Hearne, providing him with access to ecclesiastical records. He was also associated with Thomas Tanner.
