= Abel Wantner =

English antiquary (c.1639–1714)

Abel Wantner or Wontner (c. 1639–1714) was an antiquary from Gloucester.

== Life ==
Wantner, the son of an innkeeper, was born in Gloucester and was made a freeman of the city in 1666. He married Alice Elton, the daughter of a Tetbury doctor, by whom he had 19 children in 17 years. He compiled a collection of heraldic and other antiquarian material relating to the history of Gloucestershire. At the time of the heralds' visitation of Gloucestershire in 1682 and 1683 he was landlord of the White Hart in Minchinhampton, and his encounter with the heralds when they stayed at the inn may have encouraged him to try to get his manuscript published. He intended to finance publication through subscription and in 1685 produced a brief prospectus including 126 names of potential subscribers. By 1691 he had returned to Gloucester and become the parish clerk of St John Baptist, Gloucester. He worked on the manuscript throughout his life, but failed to bring it to publication. The first history of Gloucestershire by Sir Robert Atkyns was published two years before his death.

Wantner's manuscript history of Gloucestershire and a volume of miscellaneous notes, which included a short history of Bristol, were acquired after his death buy Richard Furney and eventually passed to the Bodleian Library in Oxford: MSS Bodl. Top. Gloucs. c.2 (S.C. 27827) & MSS Bodl. Top. Gloucs. c.3 (S.C. 27828). Other manuscripts appear to have been lost. Although his unpublished work was criticized by later historians of Gloucestershire such as Furney and Thomas Fosbroke, that did not prevent them mining it for material.
