= Azets =

Scottish firm of accountants and business advisors

Campbell Dallas
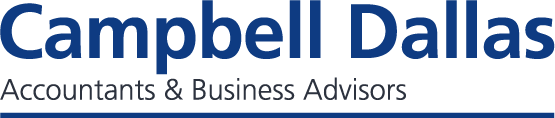
- Company type: Accountants & Business Advisors
- Industry: Professional services
- Founded: 1999; 27 years ago
- Headquarters: Glasgow, Scotland
- Area served: United Kingdom
- Services: Accountants / Tax advice / Financial and business adviser, training provider, Corporate Finance
- Number of employees: 500+ (2017)
- Parent: Azets
- Website: www.campbelldallas.co.uk

Campbell Dallas is a firm of accountants & business advisors in Scotland, which now forms part of Azets.

Campbell Dallas was formed in 1999 with the merger of Campbell & Co of Bearsden & Paisley and Dallas Nicoll & Co of Paisley. More acquisitions followed: in 2003, they acquired Reeves & Neylan Chartered Accountants of Perth, in 2005 they acquired MacMillan Chartered Accountants of Glasgow, in 2006 MacPherson & Company of Aberdeen and Gordon Ferguson & Company of Stirling, and in 2016 W White & Co of Kilmarnock and Bell & Company of Perth. In 2017 they became part of Cogital and in 2020 the business rebranded to Azets.

The firm had over 500 staff including 50 partners, operating from 7 locations across Scotland; Aberdeen, Ayr, Edinburgh, Glasgow, Inverness, Perth, and Stirling. The business now operates under the Azets brand in Scotland.

== Awards ==
Campbell Dallas is Scotland's Accountancy Firm of the Year 2017, 2016 and 2015 and award holders of the Training Team of the Year. They are currently ranked as one of the Top Five Scottish Accountancy firms and scooped up Corporate Finance Team of the Year and Restructuring Team of the Year at the Scottish Accountancy and Finance Awards, 2016. They were a finalist in the mid-tier category at the British Accountancy Awards 2017, winners of Best Tax Practice in a Devolved Administration at the Tolley's Taxation Awards 2017 and Aileen Scott received a Scottish Women's Award for Services to Accountancy and Finance 2017.

== Sustainability ==
In December 2015 the roof of their Glasgow office was kitted out with 300 solar panels to harness clean and renewable energy to help power the office. In April 2017 they acquired two electric cars which staff can use for business travel. The solar panels in one year produced enough green energy to drive a company BMW i3 nearly ten times around the world – or 250,000 miles. The investment in electric vehicles and solar panels is a core part of the firm's desire to place sustainability at the heart of its corporate culture.

== Investing in people ==
Campbell Dallas is an ICAS approved training provider, an ACCA Platinum Level Accredited Training Firm and an AAT Accredited Employer. They hold the Investors in Young People Gold Accreditation, which recognises the importance the firm places on the recruitment, retention and development of young people.

== Azets ==
In 2017, the firm became part of the international group Azets. and in September 2020 the business rebranded to Azets across the UK, Europe and Nordics.
