= Brockworth =

Village and parish in Gloucestershire, England

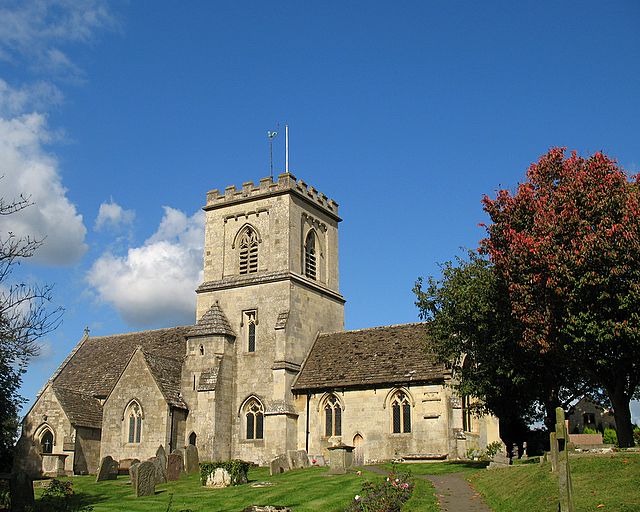
- St George's Church, Brockworth

- Location within Gloucestershire
- Population: 9,422 (2021 Census)
- District: Tewkesbury
- Shire county: Gloucestershire
- Region: South West
- Country: England
- Sovereign state: United Kingdom
- Post town: Gloucester
- Postcode district: GL3
- Police: Gloucestershire
- Fire: Gloucestershire
- Ambulance: South Western
- UK Parliament: North Cotswolds
- Website: Parish Council

Brockworth is a village and parish in the Borough of Tewkesbury, Gloucestershire, England, on the old Roman road that connects the City of Gloucester with Barnwood. It lies 4 miles (6.4 km) southeast of central Gloucester, 6 miles (9.7 km) southwest of Cheltenham and 11.5 miles (18.5 km) north of Stroud. The population at the 2021 census was 9,422, an increase on the 7,387 recorded in 2011.

Since the mid-20th century, Brockworth has been known locally for the annual rolling of Double Gloucester cheese down Cooper's Hill. During World War II the Gloster Aircraft Company produced the famous Hawker Hurricane fighter, and following the war it gained renewed fame for producing several notable aircraft, including Britain's first jet aircraft, which was test flown here.

== History ==
The name Brockworth is derived from the Saxon name Brocwurthin, combining "broc" for brook and "wurthin" for enclosure. Settlement is believed to have occurred around 600 AD, after the defeat of the Gloucester-based Romano British at the Battle of Dyrham in 577 AD. Older, Roman remains have been found locally but they indicate an estate rather than a village. Also, the Saxon-derived name suggests that the first settlers were Saxons.

The oldest surviving building in the village is the Grade I listed building St George's Church, which dates back to 1142. The present structure has elements from then until the nineteenth century. Adjacent to this is the Tudor manor house Brockworth Court, a Grade II* listed building, that was built between 1534 and 1539 for Richard Hart, the last prior of Llanthony Priory.

Brockworth was the third in a series of rural villages located along an old Roman road following a more-or-less straight line to the inland port city of Gloucester. Its original semi-remote location made it ideal for the location of an aircraft factory (now the Gloucester Business Park) where aeroplanes could be built and tested without worries about noise. Also, land availability made the area ideal for a flight test airfield.

=== Gloster Aircraft Company ===
The Gloster Aircraft Company was first formed at Hucclecote, Gloucestershire in 1915, as the Gloucestershire Aircraft Company. In 1926 the name of the company was abbreviated to Gloster Aircraft Company because customers outside of the United Kingdom found the original name too difficult to pronounce. In May 1934 the company was purchased by Hawker Aircraft but the company name was unchanged.

From 1921 the company produced the following aircraft types: Sparrowhawk, Nighthawk, Nightjar, Grouse, Grebe, Gamecock, Gorcock, Guan, Gambit, Gnatsnapper, Gauntlet, Gladiator, Hawker Hurricane; Hawker Typhoon; Gloster Meteor and Gloster Javelin and its runway became famous for the first flight of Sir Frank Whittle's turbo-jet aircraft.

The Gloster Aircraft Company (known locally as GAC) drew upon an employment pool from the surrounding area and it was responsible for much of the growth in the development of housing estates which was halted by the outbreak of World War II. During the war Brockworth and the surrounding area were bombed by the Luftwaffe in an attempt to halt the production of aircraft.

=== 1939–45 WWII production ===
As the pre-war biplane Gladiator was rapidly rendered obsolete by faster monoplanes, the Brockworth factory was available to manufacture Hawker aircraft. In 1939 the company built 1,000 Hawker Hurricanes in the first 12 months of World War II; it delivered the last of 2,750 Hurricanes in 1942. Production was then switched to building 3,330 Hawker Typhoons for the Royal Air Force. On 8 April 1941 the first test flight of the Gloster E28/39 with a single turbo-jet engine (invented by Sir Frank Whittle) took off from the company's flight test airfield at Brockworth. This was followed by the twin-engined Gloster Meteor, the only jet to be used by the Allied Forces during World War II. The speed of the Meteor enabled it to fly alongside V1 flying bombs and tip them off course, to crash before they could arrive at their London target. In 1945 the Meteor set a world speed record of 606 mph (975 km/h) and it was eventually put into service by 12 nations.

=== Post-WWII ===
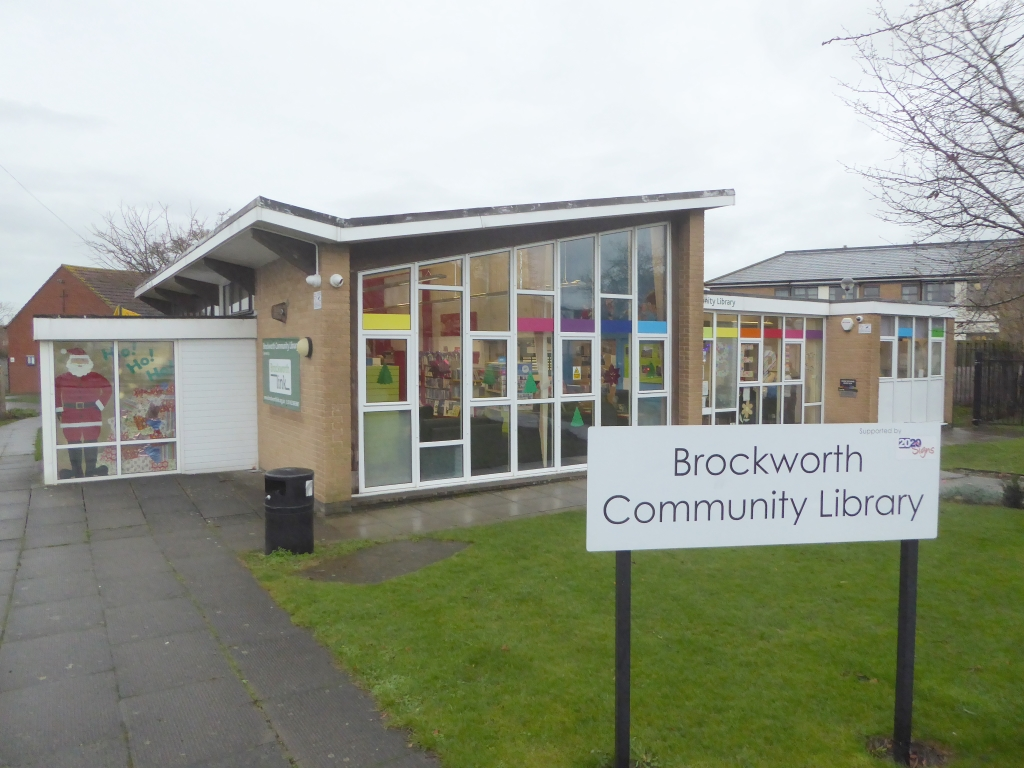
Brockworth Community Library

Following World War II it took the area many years to revive; but after the mid-1950s, renewed housing growth, the development of motorways and redistricting eventually changed the entire look of Brockworth and what were once adjoining villages. In 1952 the Brockworth factory produced the two seat, delta-winged Gloster Javelin which was developed as an all weather fighter that could fly above 50,000 feet at almost the speed of sound. In 1962 the Gloster Aircraft Company closed. The airfield was redeveloped as Gloucester Business Park, with housing developments such as Coopers Edge growing around it.

== Notable residents ==
Brockworth is the birthplace of actor, comedian and writer Simon Pegg.

== Cooper's Hill ==
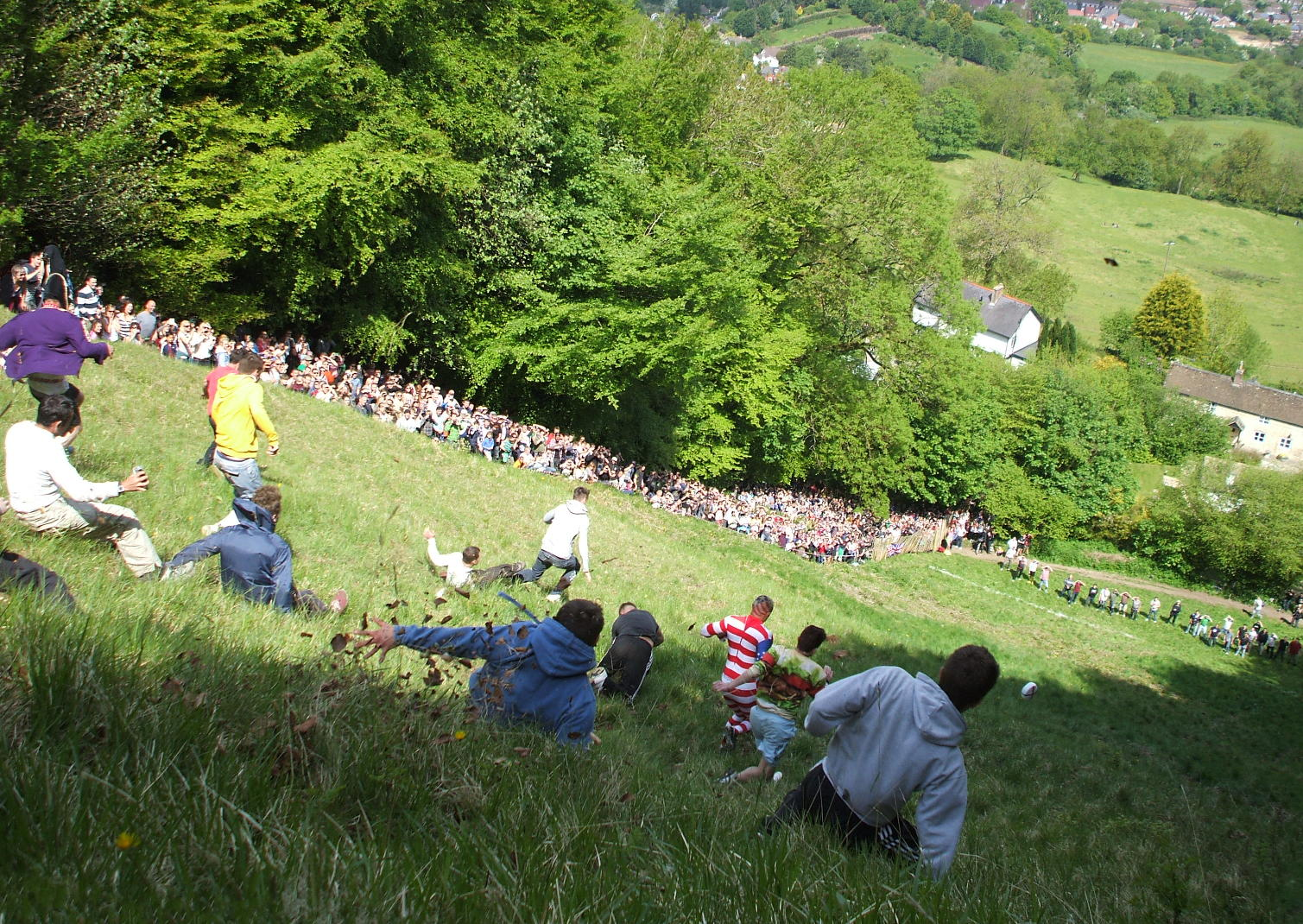
The annual Cooper's Hill Cheese-Rolling and Wake, 2013

Cooper's Hill (grid reference SO892146) is a local landmark within the parish of Brockworth, which is 200 yards (180 m) long, and with a slope of around 50 per cent (26.6 degrees). It is known in Britain and beyond for its annual cheese rolling contest. A large round cheese is rolled down the steep slope of the hill and chased by a group of "runners", who in fact spend most of their brief descent to the bottom of the hill falling and tumbling. Two hundred years ago this was part of a larger mid-summer festival with other activities and competitions, but the event is now confined to the cheese-rolling and is held in May during the Spring Bank-holiday Monday. It is usually said to have originated as a pagan festival celebrating the arrival of summer, fertility, or both.

The contest was the subject of the BBC One programme The Great Cheese Chase broadcast in 2018.

The Witcombe Festival was originally held at the bottom of Coopers Hill but since 2018 has been in Brockworth Road.

== See also ==
- Coopers Edge
- Cooper's Hill Cheese-Rolling and Wake
