= Gloucestershire =

County of England

- Non-metropolitan and ceremonial county
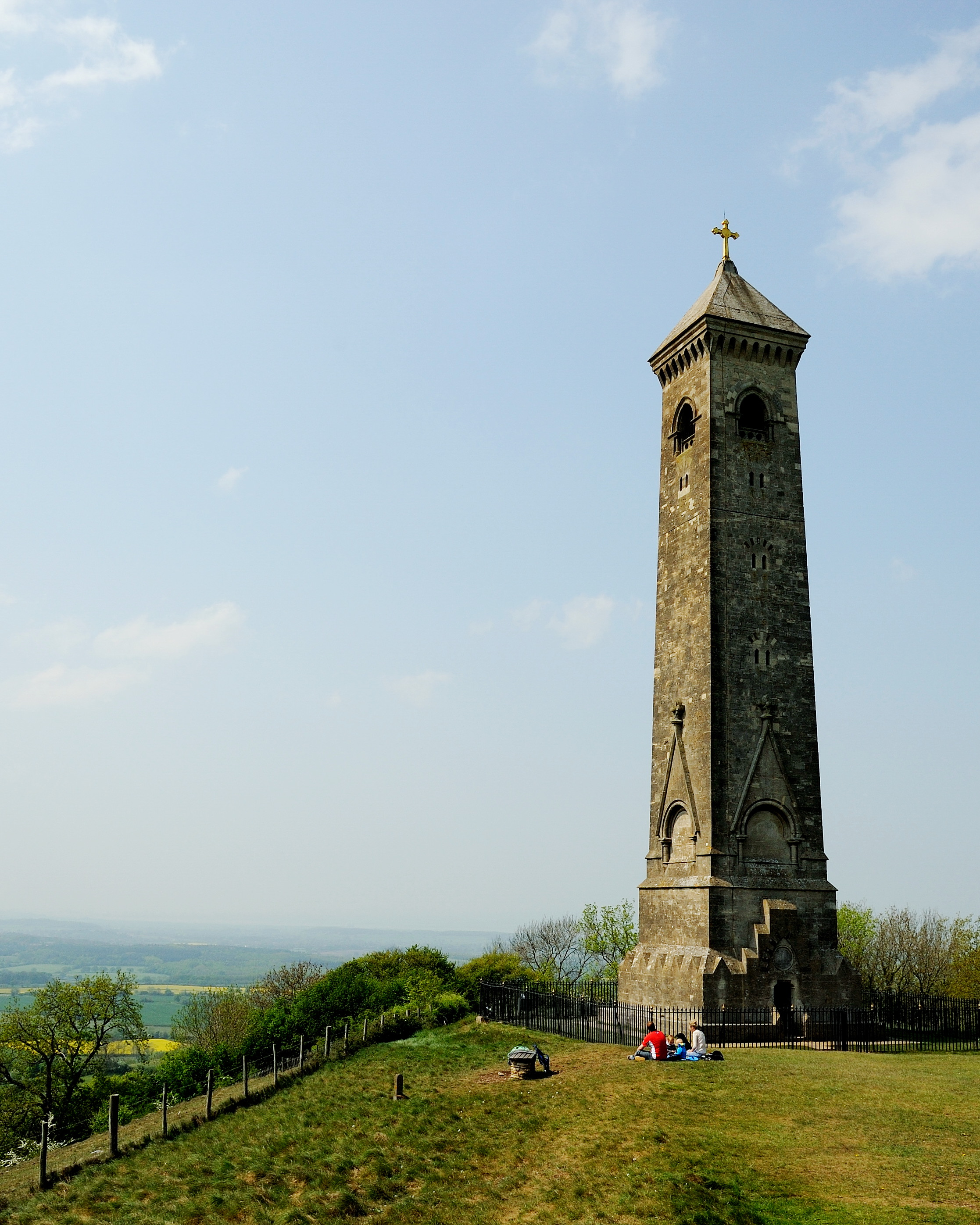
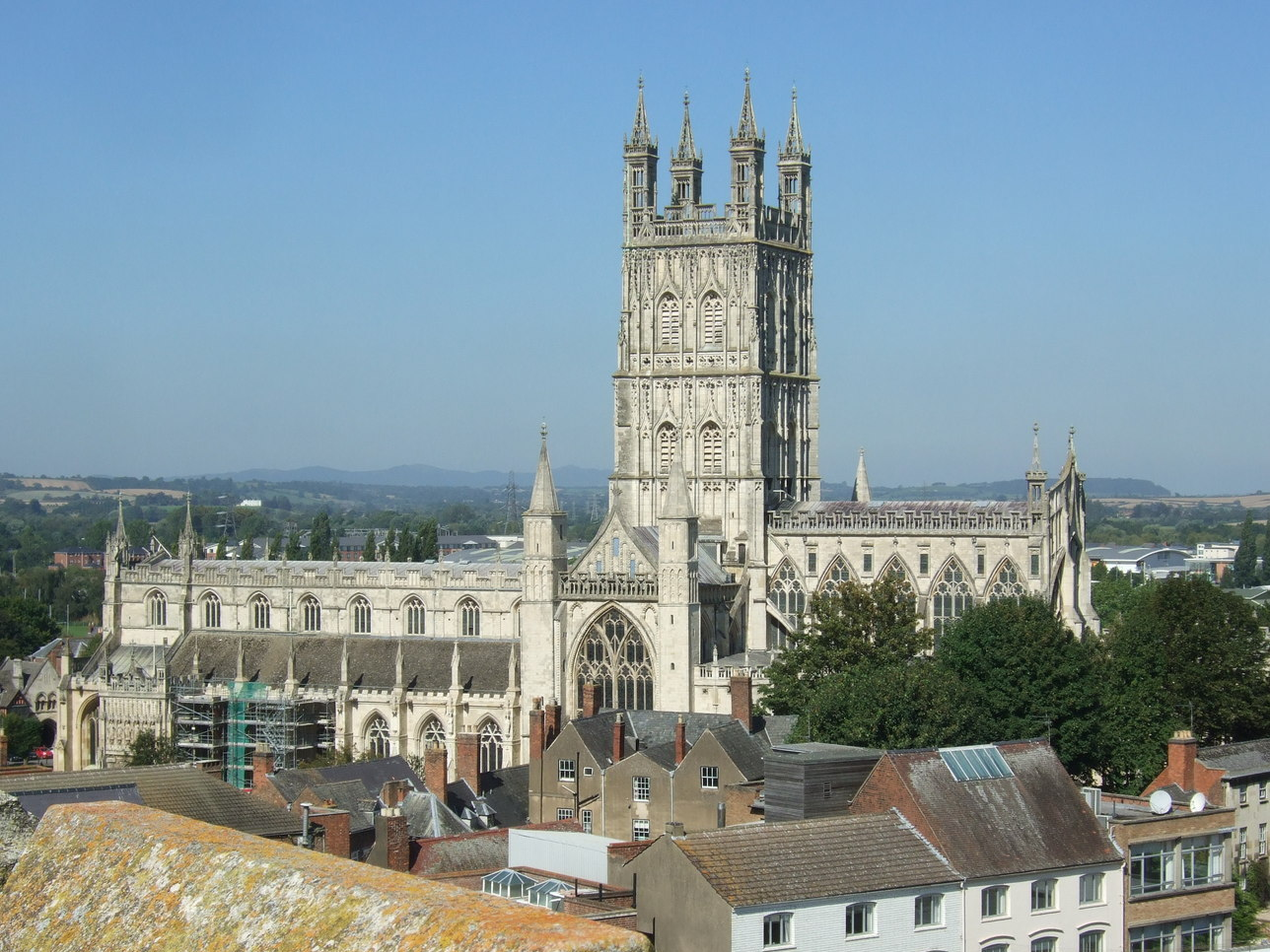
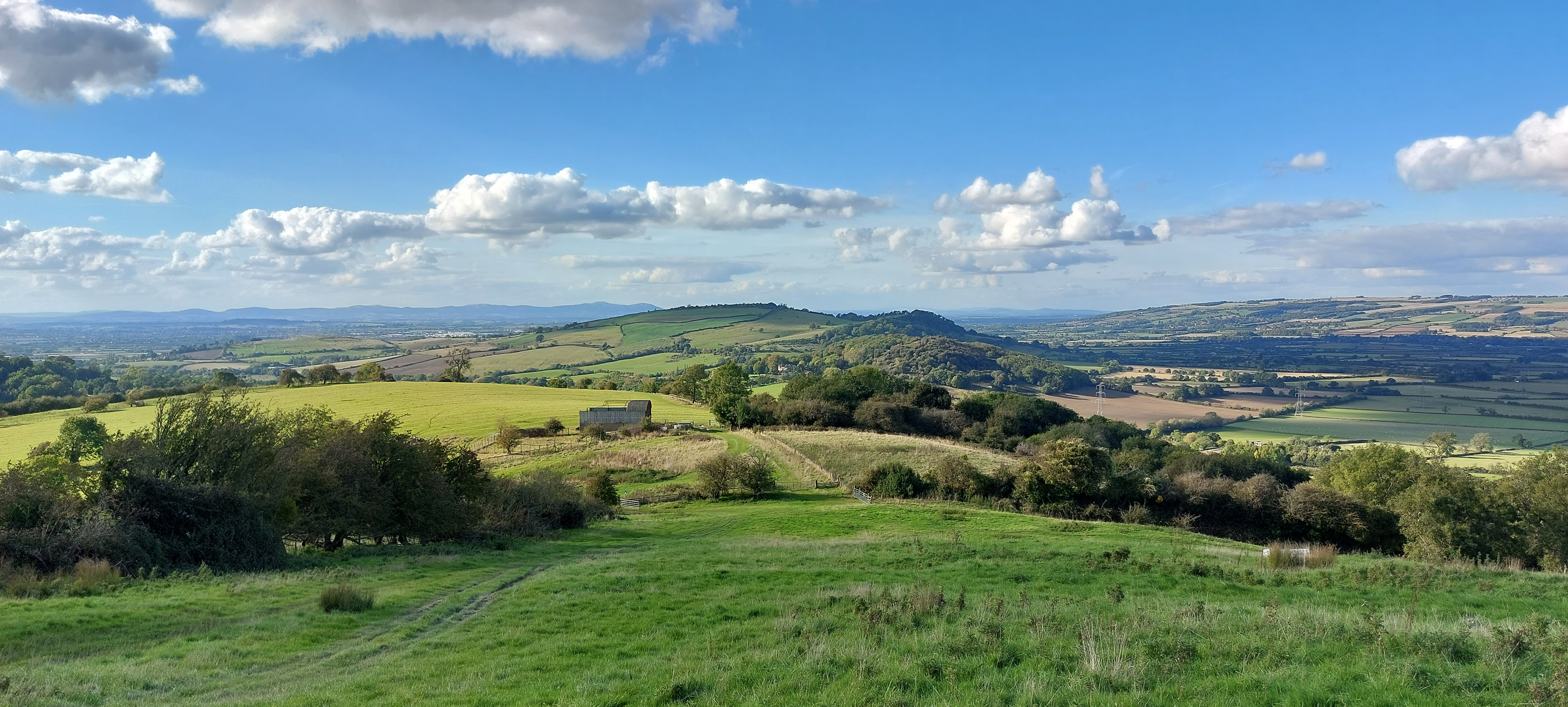
- Clockwise from top left: Tyndale Monument, North Nibley; Gloucester Cathedral; and the Cotswolds near Winchcombe

- Coordinates: 51.8°N 2.2°W
- Sovereign state: United Kingdom
- Constituent country: England
- Region: South West
- Established: Ancient
- Time zone: UTC+0 (GMT)
  - Summer (DST): UTC+1 (BST)
- UK Parliament: List of MPs
- Police: Gloucestershire Constabulary
- Ceremonial county
- Lord Lieutenant: Edward Gillespie
- High Sheriff: Dame Fiona Claire Reynolds
- Area: 3,149 km^{2} (1,216 sq mi)
  - Rank: 16th of 48
- Population (2024): 975,712
  - Rank: 24th of 48
  - Density: 310/km^{2} (800/sq mi)
- Non-metropolitan county
- County council: Gloucestershire County Council
- Control: No overall control
- Admin HQ: Gloucester
- Area: 2,652 km^{2} (1,024 sq mi)
  - Rank: 10th of 21
- Population (2024): 669,380
  - Rank: 18th of 21
  - Density: 252/km^{2} (650/sq mi)
- ISO 3166-2: GB-GLS
- GSS code: E10000013
- ITL: UKK13
- Website: gloucestershire.gov.uk
- Unitary authorities
- Councils: South Gloucestershire Council
- Districts
- Districts of Gloucestershire; Unitary County council area
- Districts: List: Tewkesbury; Forest of Dean; Gloucester; Cheltenham; Stroud; Cotswold; South Gloucestershire

Gloucestershire (/ˈɡlɒstərʃər/ GLOST-ər-shər, /-ʃɪər/ -sheer; abbreviated Glos.) is a ceremonial county in South West England. It is bordered by Herefordshire to the north-west, Worcestershire to the north, Warwickshire to the north-east, Oxfordshire to the east, Wiltshire to the south, Bristol and Somerset to the south-west, and the Welsh county of Monmouthshire to the west. The largest settlement is the city of Gloucester.

The county is predominantly rural, with an area of 3,150 square kilometres (1,220 sq mi), and an estimated population of 975,712 in 2024. Gloucester is in the north-centre of the county, and the spa town of Cheltenham is immediately to the east. Other towns include Tewkesbury in the north, Cirencester in the east, Stroud in the centre, and Yate in the south. The far south of the county, including Filton and Kingswood, is densely populated and forms part of the Bristol built-up area. For local government purposes Gloucestershire comprises a non-metropolitan county, with six districts, and the unitary authority area of South Gloucestershire. South Gloucestershire Council is a member of the West of England Combined Authority.

Gloucestershire is bisected by the River Severn, which enters the county near Tewkesbury and forms a wide valley down its centre before broadening into a large tidal estuary. The east of the county contains the majority of the Cotswolds, and the uplands in the west are part of the Forest of Dean and the Wye Valley. All three areas have been designated national landscapes.

Gloucestershire was likely established in the tenth century and expanded to approximately its current borders in the eleventh. The county was relatively settled during the late Middle Ages, and contained several wealthy monasteries such as Tewkesbury, Gloucester, Hailes, and Cirencester; the Forest of Dean was also a major iron-producing region in this period. The city of Bristol became an independent county in 1373, by which point it was the third-largest city in England. Gloucestershire was not heavily industrialised during the Industrial Revolution, but the Port of Gloucester was expanded with new docks and the small Forest of Dean coalfield was exploited.

== History ==
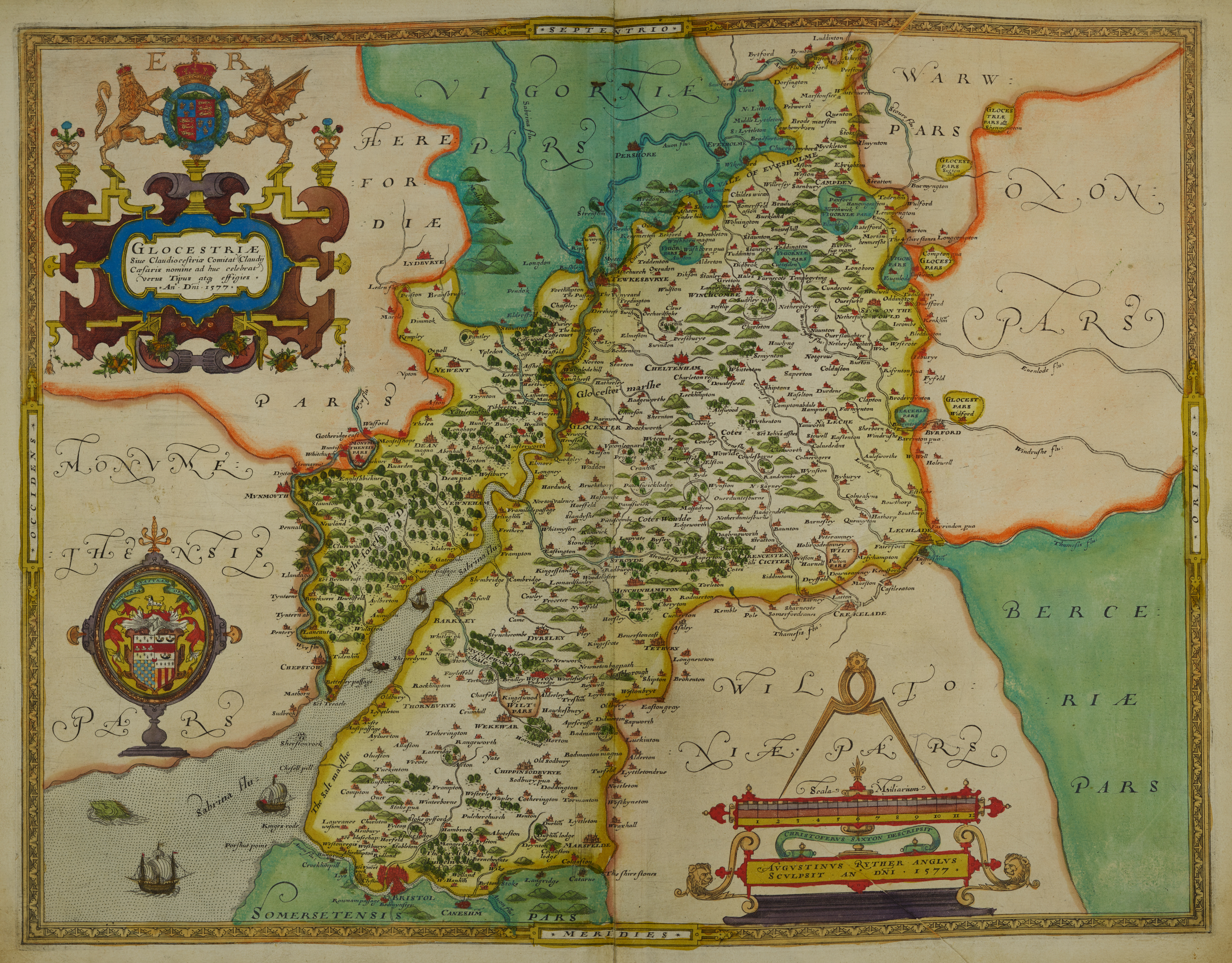
Hand-drawn map of Gloucestershire by Christopher Saxton in 1579

Gloucestershire is a historic county mentioned in the Anglo-Saxon Chronicle in the 10th century, though the areas of Winchcombe and the Forest of Dean were not added until the late 11th century.

Gloucestershire originally included Bristol, then a small town. Members of local rural communities moved to the port city (which was to become Bristol), and Bristol's population grew rapidly during the Industrial Revolution. Bristol became a county in its own right, separate from Gloucestershire and Somerset, in 1373. It later became part of the administrative County of Avon from 1974 to 1996. Some northern parts of the county, including Long Marston and Welford-on-Avon, were transferred to Warwickshire in 1931.

The flag of the historic county of Gloucestershire

Upon the abolition of Avon in 1996, the region north of Bristol became a unitary authority area of South Gloucestershire and is now part of the ceremonial county of Gloucestershire. In March 2008, the ceremonial county of Gloucestershire adopted a flag through a contest judged by the High Sheriff of Gloucestershire, Jonathan Carr.

In July 2007, Gloucestershire was subject to some of the worst flooding in recorded British history, with tens of thousands of residents affected. The RAF conducted the largest peacetime domestic operation in its history to rescue over 120 residents from flood-affected areas. The damage was estimated at over £2 billion.

== Geography and environment ==
Gloucestershire has three main landscape areas: a large part of the Cotswolds, the Royal Forest of Dean, and the Severn Vale. The Cotswolds take up a large portion of the east and south of the county, the Forest of Dean taking up the west, with the Severn and its valley running between these features. The Daffodil Way in the Leadon Valley, on the border of Gloucestershire and Herefordshire surrounding the village of Dymock, is known for its many spring flowers, orchards, and woodland, which attracts many walkers.

== Demography ==
=== Ethnicity ===
For the overwhelming majority of Gloucestershire’s history, the population of the ceremonial county was ethnically homogeneous, with the population being of White British ethnicity. In the 2021 census, the ceremonial county of Gloucestershire had a usual resident population of 935,500. The ceremonial county of Gloucestershire is divided between one non-metropolitan county: Gloucestershire County Council, which, in the 2021 census, had a usual resident population of 645,100, and one unitary authority: South Gloucestershire Council, which, in the 2021 census, had a usual resident population of 290,400. In the 2021 census, the ethnic composition of the ceremonial county of Gloucestershire comprised: 92.5% White; 3.2% Asian; 1.3% Black; 2.3% Mixed; and 0.8% Other.

- White (92.5%): English; Welsh; Scottish; Northern Irish or British (87.2%); Irish (0.6%); Gypsy or Irish Traveller (0.2%); Roma (0.1%); and Other White (4.5%).
- Asian (3.2%): Indian (1.4%); Pakistani (0.3%); Bangladeshi (0.2%); Chinese (0.5%); and Other Asian (0.7%).
- Black (1.3%): African (0.7%); Caribbean (0.4%); and Other Black (0.2%).
- Mixed (2.3%): White and Asian (0.6%); White and Black African (0.3%); White and Black Caribbean (0.8%); and Other Mixed or Multiple ethnic groups (0.5%).
- Other (0.8%): Arab (0.2%) and Any other ethnic group (0.6%).

Note: Sub-group totals may not sum exactly to the group total due to rounding. Data for the ceremonial county are aggregated from its constituent unitary authorities.

Ethnic groups in Gloucestershire (ceremonial county)
Ethnic Group	2001 Census	2011 Census	2021 Census				
Ethnic Group	2001 Census	2011 Census	2021 Census	White	97.3%	95.3%	92.5%
Asian	1.2%	2.2%	3.2%				
Black	0.5%	0.9%	1.3%				
Mixed	0.8%	1.4%	2.3%				
Other	0.2%	0.2%	0.8%				

Note: The 2001 census figures for 'Asian' and 'Other' have been adjusted to reflect the 2011 reclassification of the Chinese ethnic group from 'Other' to 'Asian' to allow comparison across census years.

=== Religion ===
Religion in Gloucestershire (ceremonial county) (2021 United Kingdom census)
1. Christianity (47.6%)
2. No religion (42.8%)
3. Islam (1.50%)
4. Hinduism (0.70%)
5. Buddhism (0.40%)
6. Sikhism (0.20%)
7. Judaism (0.10%)
8. Other religion (0.50%)
9. Not stated (6.10%)

In the 2021 census, the religious composition of the ceremonial county of Gloucestershire comprised: 47.6% Christianity; 42.8% No religion; 1.5% Islam; 0.7% Hinduism; 0.4% Buddhism; 0.2% Sikhism; 0.1% Judaism; 0.5% Other religion; and 6.1% Not stated.

Religion in Gloucestershire (ceremonial county)
Religion	2001 Census	2011 Census	2021 Census				
Religion	2001 Census	2011 Census	2021 Census	Christianity	75.3%	62.3%	47.6%
No religion	15.7%	27.9%	42.8%				
Islam	0.5%	0.9%	1.5%				
Hinduism	0.3%	0.5%	0.7%				
Buddhism	0.2%	0.3%	0.4%				
Sikhism	0.1%	0.1%	0.2%				
Judaism	0.1%	0.1%	0.1%				
Other religion	0.3%	0.4%	0.5%				
Not stated	7.5%	7.5%	6.1%				

== Governance ==
=== Gloucestershire County ===
The County Council shares responsibility with six district councils: Tewkesbury, Forest of Dean, City of Gloucester, Cheltenham, Stroud, and Cotswold.

Since the May 2025 election, Gloucestershire County Council has been governed by a Liberal Democrat minority administration led by Councillor Lisa Spivey. Reform UK became the second largest party in terms of seats. This shift ended 20 years of Conservative minority/majority rule. The Liberal Democrats received a plurality of the vote with 27.2%, followed closely by the Reform UK on 25.2% and Conservatives on 20.2%.

=== South Gloucestershire Council ===
The southernmost part of the county, South Gloucestershire, is governed by South Gloucestershire Council, which is a unitary authority council independent of the county council, but the unitary authority is still part of the ceremonial county. Previously, the area of South Gloucestershire was part of the county of Avon. Although Avon was abolished in 1996, some services in South Gloucestershire are still provided in conjunction with other former parts of Avon county, such as the Avon Fire and Rescue Service. Since 2017, South Gloucestershire has been part of the West of England Combined Authority, which is led by the mayor of the West of England.

Since the May 2023 election, South Gloucestershire Council has been governed by a Liberal Democrat–Labour coalition administration led by Councillor Maggie Tyrrell since July 2024. The Conservatives remained the largest party in terms of seats. This shift ended 16 years of Conservative minority/majority rule. The Conservatives received a plurality of the vote with 35.9%, followed closely by the Liberal Democrats on 33.9% and Labour on 24.2%.

=== Future ===
In July 2026, the UK Government announced its intention to reorganise the non-metropolitan county of Gloucestershire into a single unitary authority area by April 2028. Elections to the new unitary council will take place in May 2027. South Gloucestershire will not be affected.

In July 2026, the government confirmed that the new unitary authority would be called Gloucestershire Council and would have 110 councillors. The new authority is scheduled to replace the existing county and district councils in April 2028, with elections to a shadow authority due to take place in May 2027.

=== Westminster Parliamentary ===
Following the 2023 Periodic Review of Westminster constituencies, the ceremonial county of Gloucestershire is represented by seven parliamentary constituencies. This change included pairing Gloucestershire with Wiltshire to create the cross-county South Cotswolds constituency.

== Economy ==
This is a chart of trend of regional gross value added of Gloucestershire at current basic prices published (pp. 240–253) by Office for National Statistics with figures in millions of Pounds Sterling.

Year	Regional Gross Value Added	Agriculture	Industry	Services
1995	5,771	196	1,877	3,698
2000	8,163	148	2,677	5,338
2003	10,617	166	2,933	7,517

The following is a chart of Gloucestershire's gross value added total in millions of Pounds Sterling from 1997 to 2009 based upon the Office for National Statistics figures

Year	GVA (£ million)
1997	7,167
1998	7,630
1999	8,034
2000	8,414
2001	8,947
2002	9,504
2003	10,117
2004	10,525
2005	10,680
2006	11,073
2007	11,563
2008	11,666
2009	11,452

The 2009 estimation of £11,452 million GVA can be compared to the South West regional average of £7,927 million.

== Education ==
=== Secondary schools ===
Gloucestershire has mainly comprehensive schools with seven selective grammar schools; two are in Stroud, Stroud High School for girls and Marling School for boys, one in Cheltenham, Pate's Grammar, and four in Gloucester, Sir Thomas Rich's for boys (aged 11–18) and girls (aged 16–18, in the sixth form), and Denmark Road High School and Ribston Hall for girls and The Crypt which is mixed. There are 42 state secondary schools, not including sixth form colleges, and 12 independent schools, including Cheltenham Ladies' College, Cheltenham College, and Dean Close School. All but about two schools in each district have a sixth form, but the Forest of Dean only has two schools with sixth forms. All schools in South Gloucestershire have sixth forms.

=== Higher and further education ===
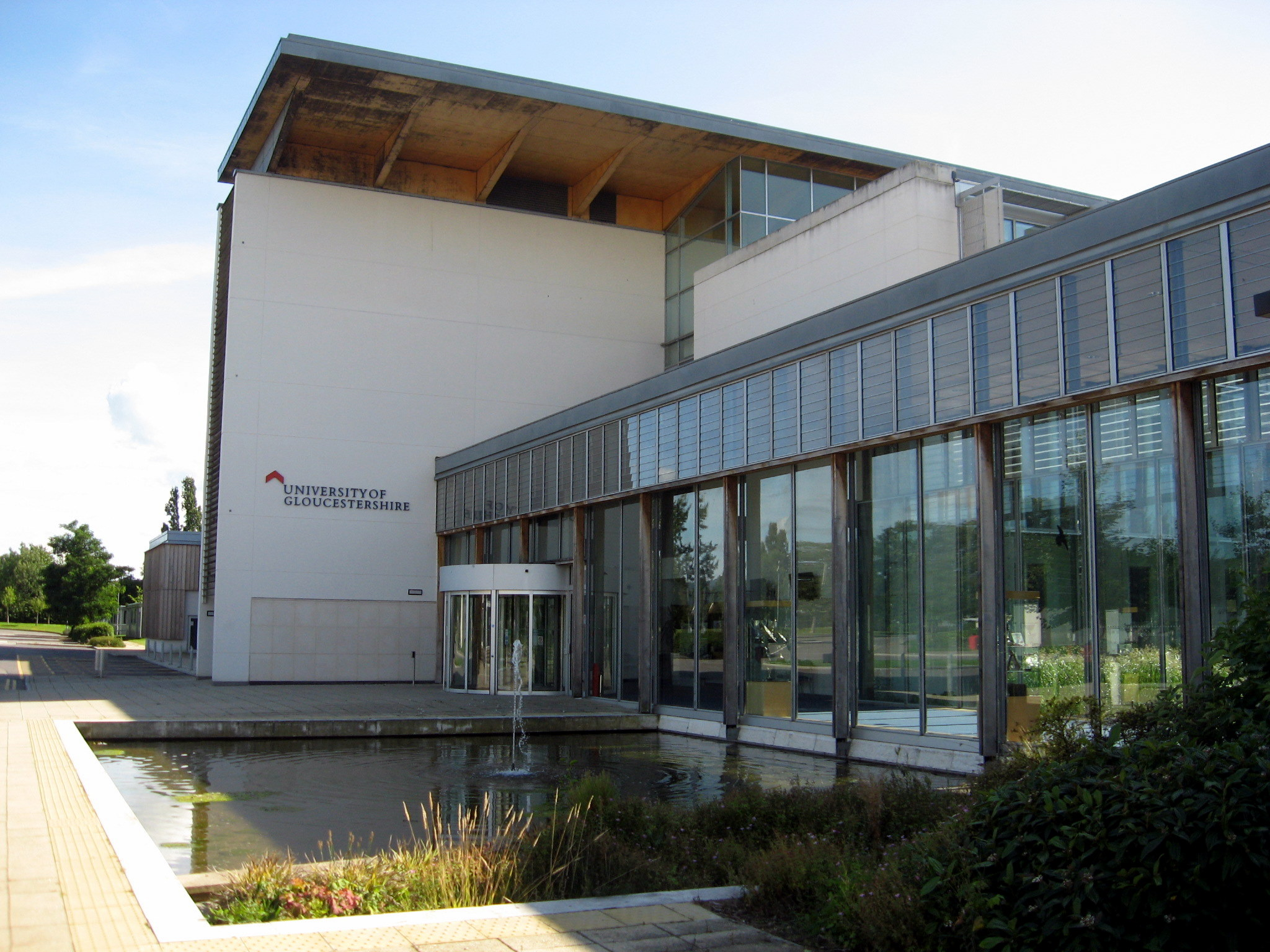
A campus of the University of Gloucestershire

Gloucestershire has three universities: the University of Gloucestershire with campuses in Cheltenham and Gloucester, the Royal Agricultural University, and Hartpury University which is also a further education college. There are four further education colleges, all of which also deliver some higher education: Gloucestershire College, Cirencester College, South Gloucestershire and Stroud College, and the Royal Forest of Dean College. Each has campuses at multiple locations throughout the county.

The University of the West of England also has two locations in Gloucestershire: a regional centre at the Gloucester Docks, Alexandra Warehouse, specialising in Adult and Mental Health Nursing; and Frenchay Campus in South Gloucestershire.

== Towns and cities ==
Gloucestershire has one city and 33 towns:

=== Cities ===
- Gloucester

=== Towns ===
The towns in Gloucestershire are:

- Berkeley
- Bradley Stoke
- Cheltenham
- Chipping Campden
- Chipping Sodbury
- Cinderford
- Cirencester
- Coleford
- Dursley
- Emersons Green
- Fairford
- Filton
- Kingswood
- Lechlade
- Lydney
- Minchinhampton
- Mitcheldean
- Moreton-in-Marsh
- Nailsworth
- Newent
- Northleach
- Painswick
- Patchway
- Quedgeley
- Stonehouse
- Stow-on-the-Wold
- Stroud
- Tetbury
- Tewkesbury
- Thornbury
- Winchcombe
- Wotton-under-Edge
- Yate

Suburban town of Stroud:

- Cainscross

Town in Monmouthshire with suburbs in Gloucestershire:

- Chepstow

=== Green belt ===
The county has two green belt areas, the first covers the southern area in the South Gloucestershire district, to protect outlying villages and towns between Thornbury and Chipping Sodbury from the urban sprawl of the Bristol conurbation. The second belt lies around Gloucester, Cheltenham, and Bishop's Cleeve, to afford those areas and villages in between a protection from urban sprawl and further convergence. Both belts intersect with the boundaries of the Cotswolds AONB.

== Transport ==
=== Railways ===
Gloucestershire once had a much larger railway network than it does now with over 100 stations in the county, the vast majority of which were closed during the Beeching cuts. Nowadays, only 15 remain within the county, mostly concentrated on the CrossCountry NE-SW route and around the North Fringe of Bristol. Some stations have been reopened in recent years; Cam and Dursley railway station opened in 1994, with Ashchurch for Tewkesbury opening three years later in 1997. Local campaign groups are also seeking to reopen several disused stations, including Charfield railway station in South Gloucestershire.

== Antiquities ==
There are a number of Roman remains scattered across the county, including the Eastgate Viewing Chamber in Gloucester and Chedworth Roman Villa.

There are a variety of religious buildings across the county, notably the cathedral of Gloucester, the abbey church of Tewkesbury (which is over 500 years old and has the tallest Norman tower in England), and the church of Cirencester. Of the abbey of Hailes near Winchcombe, founded by Richard, Earl of Cornwall, in 1246, little more than the foundations are left, but these have been excavated and fragments have been brought to light.

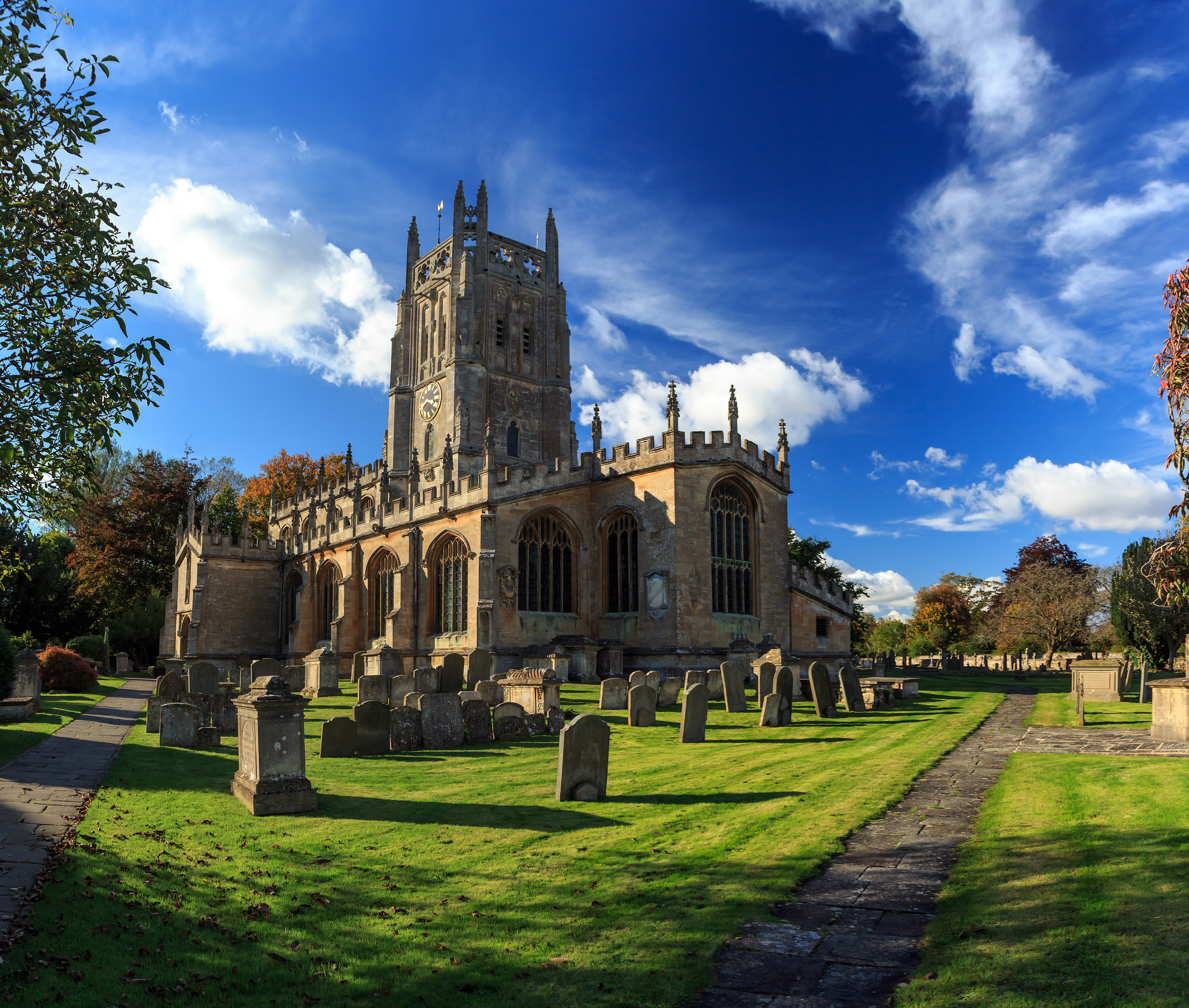
Parish Church of St. Mary, Fairford

Most of the old market towns have parish churches. At Deerhurst near Tewkesbury and Bishop's Cleeve near Cheltenham, there are churches of special interest on account of the pre-Norman work they retain. There is also a Perpendicular church in Lechlade, and that at Fairford was built (c. 1500), according to tradition, to contain a series of stained-glass windows which are said to have been brought from the Netherlands. These are, however, adjudged to be of English workmanship.

Other notable buildings include Calcot Barn in Calcot, a relic of Kingswood Abbey. Thornbury Castle is a Tudor country house, the pretensions of which evoked the jealousy of Cardinal Wolsey against its builder, Edward Stafford, duke of Buckingham, who was beheaded in 1521. Near Cheltenham is the 15th-century mansion of Southam de la Bere, of timber and stone. Memorials of the de la Bere family appear in the church at Cleeve. The mansion contains a tiled floor from Hailes Abbey. At Great Badminton is the mansion and vast domain of the Beauforts (formerly of the Botelers and others), on the south-eastern boundary of the county. Berkeley Castle at over 800 years old and the ruins of Witcombe Roman Villa at Great Witcombe are also notable heritage features.

There are several royal residences in Gloucestershire, including Highgrove House, Gatcombe Park, and (formerly) Nether Lypiatt Manor.

An annual "cheese-rolling" event takes place at Cooper's Hill, near Brockworth, and the Cotswold Games occurred within the county.

== Places of interest ==
Key
	Abbey/Priory/Cathedral
Accessible open space	Accessible open space
	Amusement/Theme Park
	Castle
Country Park	Country Park
	English Heritage
	Forestry Commission
Heritage railway	Heritage railway
Historic house	Historic House
Places of Worship	Places of Worship
Museum (free) Museum	Museum (free/not free)
National Trust	National Trust
	Theatre
	Zoo

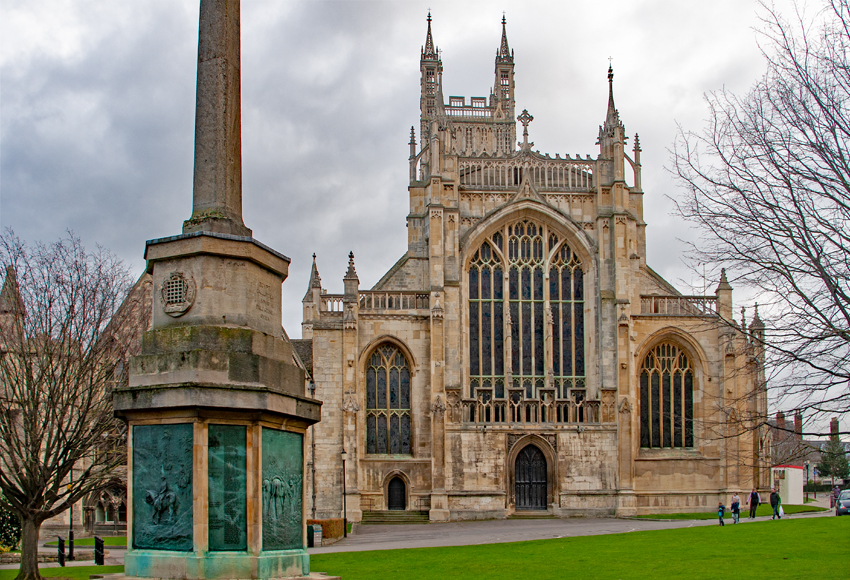
Gloucester cathedral west front

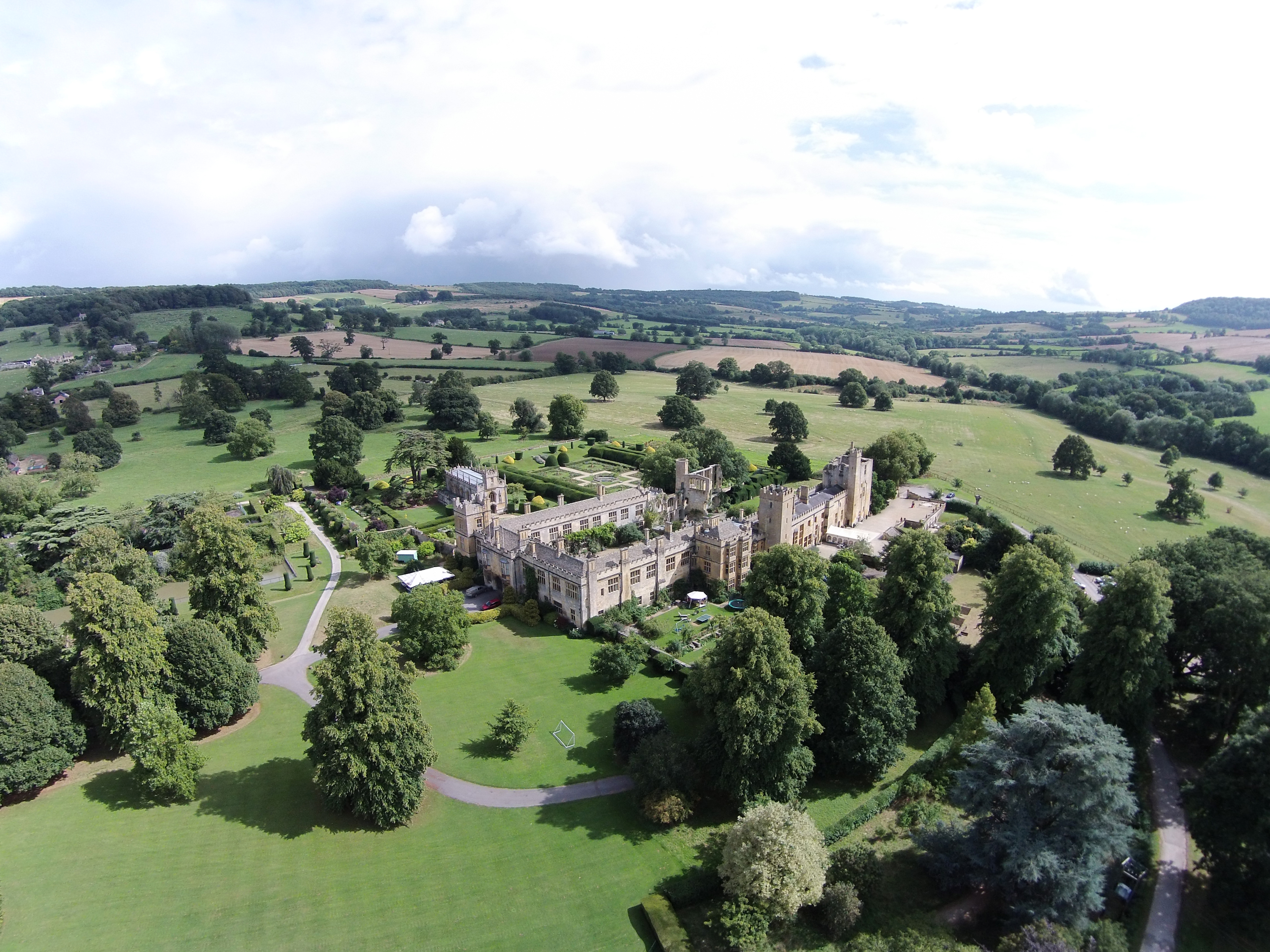
Aerial photo of Sudeley Castle

Places of interest in Gloucestershire include:

- Badminton House, residence of the Dukes of Beaufort
- Berkeley Castle, an example of a feudal stronghold.
- Beverston Castle
- Chavenage House
- Cheltenham Minster
- Clearwell Caves
- Dean Forest Railway
- Dyrham Park
- Edward Jenner's House
- Gloucester Cathedral
- Gloucestershire Warwickshire Railway
- Hailes Abbey
- Newark Park
- Owlpen Manor
- Rodborough and Minchinhampton Commons
- Snowshill Manor
- Sudeley Castle, burial place of Queen Catherine Parr, 6th wife and consort of King Henry VIII.
- Stanway House
- River Thames
- Rodmarton Manor
- Severn Bore
- St. John the Baptist Church, Cirencester
- Tewkesbury Abbey
- Tewkesbury Medieval Festival
- Tyndale Monument
- Wildfowl and Wetland Trust, Slimbridge
- Westbury Court Garden
- Westonbirt Arboretum
- Woodchester Mansion

Areas of countryside in Gloucestershire include:

- Forest of Dean
- Wye Valley

Scenic Railway Line:

- Gloucester to Newport Line

== Media ==
Gloucestershire's only daily newspaper is the Western Daily Press, while The Citizen, which covers Gloucester, Stroud and the Forest of Dean, and the Gloucestershire Echo, which covers Cheltenham, Tewkesbury and the Cotswolds, were published daily but since October 2017 have been weekly publications. All three, along with free weeklies 'The Forester', 'Stroud Life', 'The Gloucester News', and 'The Cheltenham and Tewkesbury News', are published by Local World. The Stroud News & Journal is a weekly paid-for newspaper based in Stroud. It is published in a tabloid format by Newsquest. Newsquest also produces the weekly Wilts and Gloucestershire Standard newspaper, which covers the southern and eastern parts of the county as well as the weekly Gloucestershire Gazette, which covers the south of the county and much of South Gloucestershire.

Gloucester News Centre is an independent news website with news and information for Gloucestershire.

Radio stations in Gloucestershire include BBC Radio Gloucestershire, BBC Radio Bristol (for South Gloucestershire), Heart West, Sunshine Radio and Greatest Hits Radio Gloucestershire. There are also several community radio stations including Gloucester FM, Radio Winchcombe, Forest of Dean Radio, North Cotswold Community Radio, and Severn FM.

Local TV for the county is provided by BBC West and ITV West Country from Bristol, although in the northern extremes of Gloucestershire, BBC Midlands and ITV Central (West) from Birmingham covers this area. Some eastern parts of the county (Cirencester and parts of the Cotswolds) receive BBC South and ITV Meridian from Oxford.

== In popular culture ==
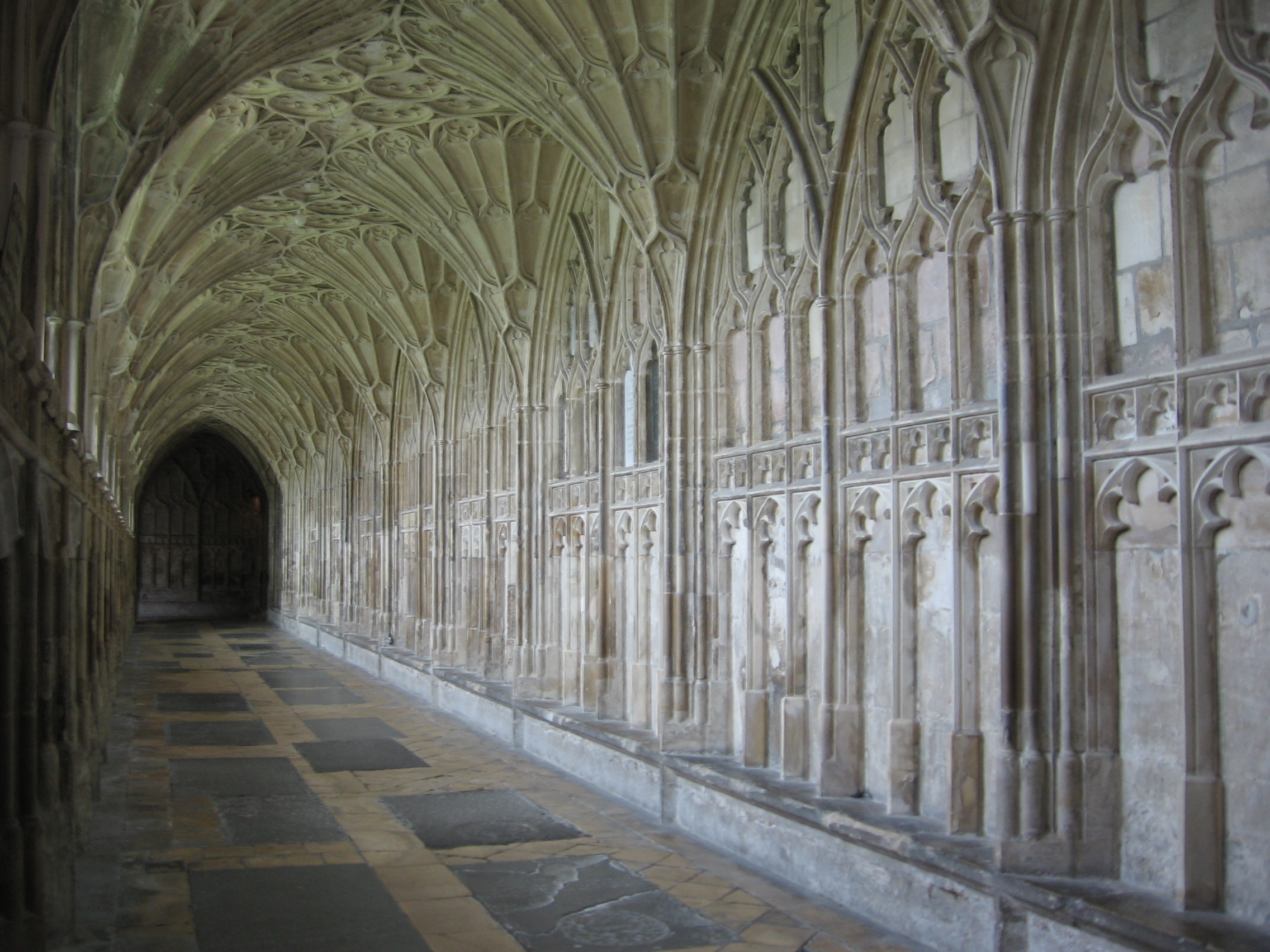
The south cloister of Gloucester Cathedral was used for filming scenes in the Harry Potter films.

There are two well-known accounts of childhood in rural Gloucestershire in the early 20th century, Laurie Lee's Cider With Rosie and Winifred Foley's A Child in the Forest. Part of Mrs. Craik's novel John Halifax, Gentleman is set in Enderley, a thinly disguised Amberley, where she lived at the time of writing. Most of the book is set in Nortonbury, easily recognisable as Tewkesbury.

The county has also been the setting for a number of high-profile movies and TV series, including Die Another Day, the Harry Potter films and the BBC TV series Butterflies.

"A Girl's Best Friend", the pilot for the proposed Doctor Who spin-off K-9 and Company, was filmed in Gloucestershire. The setting is the fictional town of Moreton Harwood. The fictional town of Leadworth in Doctor Who is in Gloucestershire. It is the home of companions Amy Pond, Rory Williams and River Song in their childhoods and young adulthoods. Additionally, the 2020 episode "Fugitive of the Judoon" was set and filmed at Gloucester Cathedral.

A fictional Brimpsfield was the village, home of Peter and Abby Grant, in the 1970s BBC TV series Survivors, with a railway connection to London.

Witcombe Festival is an annual music festival held in Brockworth. As well as music, the three-day festival has its roots deep in cider. The festival consists of four stages and has been headlined by Dizzee Rascal, Plan B, Sigma, Ella Eyre, Example, Wiley, Heather Small, Lethal Bizzle and Tinchy Stryder.

The Romano/Celtic temple ruins in Lydney Park contributed to J.R.R. Tolkien's description of The Shire in his Middle-earth Legendarium.

== Animals ==
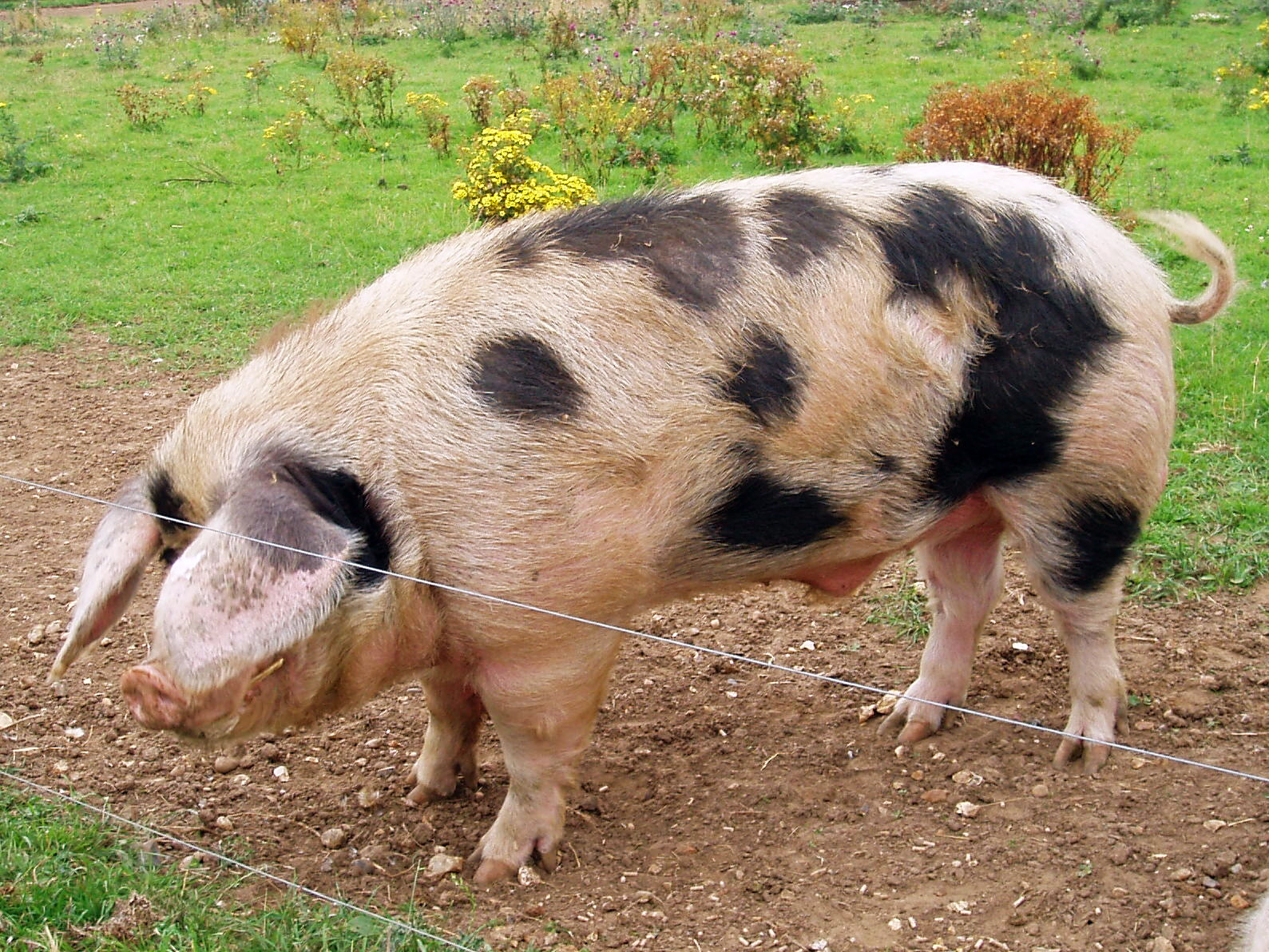
A boar of the local Gloucestershire Old Spot breed

The famous Gloucestershire Old Spots pig is named for Gloucestershire and is historically associated with the county. Sheep roam widely in the Forest of Dean. The Forest of Dean and the Wye Valley also have wild boar.

Gloucester cattle, a rare breed, can still be found in and around Gloucestershire. They can be recognised by the white stripe that runs down the centre of their backs to the tip of their tails. The cattle are famous for producing milk for both Single Gloucester and Double Gloucester cheeses.

== See also ==
- Custos Rotulorum of Gloucestershire – Keepers of the Rolls
- Diocese of Gloucester
- Gloucestershire (UK Parliament constituency) – Historical list of MPs for Gloucestershire constituency
- Gloucestershire County Cricket Club
- Gloucestershire Police and Crime Commissioner
- Gloucestershire Regiment
- High Sheriff of Gloucestershire
- Lord Lieutenant of Gloucestershire
- List of English and Welsh endowed schools (19th century)#Gloucestershire
- List of people from Gloucestershire
- List of hills of Gloucestershire
- Royal Gloucestershire Hussars
- West Country dialects
- Category:Grade I listed buildings in Gloucestershire
