= List of rural sports and games =

This page lists sports and games which have traditionally been played in rural areas.

Some take the form of annual events in a particular location associated with the tradition. Others have become more widespread, being played in local fairs or festivities in different areas. Some are pub games. Many remain somewhat obscure, and perhaps due to their unusual or quirky nature, have not developed into established sports.

- Aunt Sally – An Oxfordshire game, it is the under arm throwing of wooden sticks at a suspended target known as the doll or dolly. Each player in the team has 6 throws. The best score out of 24 wins.
- Bat and trap – An English bat-and-ball game, played in pub gardens mostly in Kent.
- Bog snorkelling – Competitors must complete two consecutive lengths of a water filled trench cut through a peat bog, in the shortest time possible.
- Coconut shy – Each player has 6 balls to throw at targets of coconuts balanced on raised stands. The player with the highest number of hits wins.
- Cooper's Hill Cheese-Rolling and Wake – Competitors race down a steep hill in Gloucestershire, attempting to catch a Double Gloucester cheese which has been set rolling from the top.
- Dwile Flonking – An East Anglian sport in which competitors use a pole to launch a beer soaked cloth at opponents. If you miss your target twice in a row, a "flonker" must quickly drink a pot of ale before the opposing team, standing in a circle, could pass around a rag one to the other.
- Ferret legging – Ferrets are trapped in trousers worn by a participant. The winner is the one who is the last to release the animals.
- Gravy wrestling – An annual charity event held in the Lancashire village of Stacksteads since 2007. Contestants wrestle in a pool of gravy (or in later years, a mixture of cornflour and caramel). Points are scored for fancy dress and entertainment value.
- Haggis hurling or throwing – A Scottish game involving throwing a haggis.
- Kubb – A lawn game originally from Sweden, which involves the throwing of wooden batons.
- River football – Played in the village of Bourton-on-the-Water in Gloucestershire.
- Shrovetide Football – Played over two days (Shrove Tuesday and Ash Wednesday) in the Derbyshire village of Ashbourne.
- Shin-kicking or hacking or purring – A combat sport that originated in England in the early 17th century. It involves two contestants attempting to kick each other on the shin to force their opponent to the ground.
- S.P.U.D. − Invented in Neptune Township, New Jersey, this a ball game where a ball is thrown into the air and the players try to peg the others.
- Tip-cat – The cat is a stubby six-inch projectile tapered at each end, which is placed on a flat surface. A baseball bat is then used to tap or hit it airborne; as it rises it is hit again with the baseball bat, as far as possible. Each player has three attempts; the team with the longest hit within the zone wins.
- Wellie wanging or gumboot throwing – Competitors are required to hurl a Wellington boot as far as possible within boundary lines, from a standing or running start.
- Wheelbarrow race – Teams of two players race with one teammate playing the role of the driver, and the other playing the role of the wheelbarrow. The driver holds on to the other player's ankles, while the other player walks with his hands. It is commonly played at fairs and family events.
- Wife carrying – Male competitors carry a female through a special obstacle track in the fastest time. The sport originated in Finland but is now played in several other countries.
- Woodchopping – Several related events, many of which are related to the speed of chopping through logs.

== See also ==
- Lumberjack-related sports
- Traditional games
