= Dwarf-tossing =

Type of bar entertainment

Dwarf-tossing, also called midget-tossing, is a pub/bar attraction or activity in which people with dwarfism, wearing special padded clothing or Velcro costumes, are thrown onto mattresses or at Velcro-coated walls. Participants compete to throw the person with dwarfism the farthest. Dwarf-tossing was started in Australia as a form of pub entertainment in the early 1980s. A related, formerly practiced activity was dwarf-bowling, in which a person with dwarfism was placed on a skateboard and used as a bowling ball.

Since its inception in the 1980s, the activity, due to its problematic name and nature, has been highly controversial; it remains controversial in the early 21st century.

== Medical risks ==
Individuals with skeletal dysplasia, such as dwarfism, often have specific medical conditions and vulnerabilities that increase the risk of complications. Throwing or tossing individuals with a growth disorder can have serious consequences, especially in cases involving kyphosis and scoliosis.

Kyphosis is a condition where the spine bends forward, leading to a curvature of the back. Scoliosis is a lateral curvature of the spine. Both conditions can cause pain, limited mobility, and respiratory problems. Dwarf tossing can increase the risk of injury and exacerbate these conditions, as it applies forces to the spine and other vulnerable parts of the body.

Various medical sources and organizations have warned about the dangers of dwarf tossing for individuals with growth disorders. There are known cases where individuals with growth disorders have suffered severe injuries and even died as a result of dwarf tossing.

== Controversy ==
Due to its nature and name, dwarf tossing has been controversial. The criticism centers on concerns about human dignity and the exploitation of little people, raising questions about the appropriateness of the practice. In the 1980s, opposition to the practice of dwarf tossing began to take shape. Advocates for banning this activity argued that it objectifies the individuals involved, reducing them to mere objects used for entertainment.

Critics of dwarf tossing assert that the practice dehumanizes the participants, treating them as if they were objects or toys. This dehumanization is perceived as detrimental because it undermines the concept of inherent human dignity, suggesting that individuals can be used in a way that disregards their autonomy and respect. This perspective is supported by research highlighting the fundamental role of human dignity in moral and legal frameworks.

The moral objections to dwarf tossing are rooted in the idea that reducing individuals to throwing objects for amusement denies their humanity and respect. This concept has been explored in various contexts, where objectification for entertainment raises broader ethical concerns. The practice can be viewed as a form of exploitation, disregarding the feelings, integrity, and self-respect of the participants.

== Legality ==
=== Australia ===
Australia is commonly thought of as the place where dwarf-tossing originated as a form of pub entertainment in the early 1980s. Laws may prohibit dwarf-tossing implicitly, but there are not explicit laws preventing a consenting dwarf from being "tossed".

=== Canada ===
In Ontario, Canada, the Dwarf Tossing Ban Act was introduced in 2003 by Windsor West MPP Sandra Pupatello in the Legislative Assembly of Ontario. This private member's public bill did not proceed beyond its introduction to second or third readings, nor did it receive royal assent, and therefore died at the close of the 37th Legislature. The bill proposed a fine of not more than $5,000 and/or imprisonment of not more than six months. The bill was hastily advanced in response to a dwarf-tossing contest that was held at Leopard's Lounge in Windsor, Ontario with a dwarf nicknamed "Tripod".

=== France ===
The mayor of the small French town of Morsang-sur-Orge prohibited dwarf-tossing. The case went through the appeal chain of administrative courts to the Conseil d'État, which found that an administrative authority could legally prohibit dwarf-tossing on grounds that the activity did not respect human dignity and was thus contrary to public order. It raised legal questions as to what was admissible as a motive for an administrative authority to ban an activity for motives of public order, especially as the conseil did not want to include "public morality" in public order. The ruling was taken by the full assembly and not a smaller panel—proof of the difficulty of the question. The conseil ruled similarly in another case between an entertainment company and the city of Aix-en-Provence.

The United Nations Human Rights Committee decided on 26 July 2002 that the ban was not discriminatory with respect to dwarfs. It ruled that the ban could be considered as "necessary to protect public order, which brings into play considerations of human dignity".

Nevertheless, dwarf-tossing is not prohibited outright in France. The Conseil d'État decided that a public authority could use gross infringement on human dignity as a motive of public order to cancel a spectacle, and that dwarf-tossing constituted such a gross infringement. However, it is up to individual authorities to make specific decisions regarding prohibition.

=== United States ===
Robert and Angela Van Etten, Florida members of the Little People of America, convinced the Florida Legislature in 1989 to make dwarf-tossing illegal. A measure banning dwarf-tossing was passed by a wide margin. The New York State Legislature later followed suit.

In 2001, Dave Flood, who appeared on the MJ Morning Show as "Dave the Dwarf", filed a lawsuit seeking to overturn the 1989 law allowing the state to fine or revoke the liquor license of a bar that allows dwarf-tossing. The pastime was popular in some Florida bars in the late 1980s.

In October 2011, Ritch Workman, a Republican member of the Florida House of Representatives, introduced legislation that would overturn the ban on dwarf-tossing, claiming such a ban to be an "unnecessary burden on the freedom and liberties of people" and "an example of Big Brother government". Although not a personal advocate of the activity, Workman stated "if a little person wants to make a fool out of themselves for money, they should have the same right to do so as any average sized person".

== Origin ==
The origin of dwarf tossing appears to stem from the historical human fascination with throwing living beings – whether roosters, foxes, or people – as a form of entertainment. Throwing at roosters and fox tossing, also known as blood sport, illustrates the human tendency to use living beings as objects in unusual forms of amusement. Although initially considered folk sports, these customs were eventually criticized and suppressed due to ethical concerns and the well-being of the involved animals. This evolution emphasizes the relationship between human entertainment, animal ethics, and the treatment of living beings as objects for amusement, with contemporary societies becoming more aware of the need to respect the dignity and well-being of individuals and animals.

== In popular culture ==
The American television drama L. A. Law (season 4, episode 4, 11/23/89 "The Mouse That Soared") featured a lawsuit to stop dwarf tossing at a local pub.

A scene in the 2002 film The Lord of the Rings: The Two Towers shows the dwarf Gimli reluctantly requesting the character Aragorn to "toss" him across a dangerous gap that he cannot jump. Gimli asks Aragorn not to tell "the elf", their comrade Legolas, and Aragorn promises. A stunt double, Brett Beattie, was the person actually thrown in the scene. In the preceding 2001 film, The Lord of the Rings: The Fellowship of the Ring, Gimli refused similar assistance, declaring, "No one tosses a dwarf!", and then almost fell to his death.

In the 2013 film The Wolf of Wall Street, a room full of boisterous stockbrokers can be seen taking turns hurling two dwarfs wearing helmets at a large dartboard, with the main character, Jordan Belfort, offering a $25,000 reward to the first "cock-sucker to nail a bullseye". Before the film's release, protests were made to distributor Paramount to remove the scene. The non-profit organization Little People of America released a statement stating they were "angry, disappointed and concerned" that the film "includes dwarf tossing scenes. [...] No matter the intent of The Wolf of Wall Street, any portrayal of dwarf tossing carries the risk of condoning the objectification of and abuse against people with dwarfism. As The Wolf of Wall Street continues to play in theaters, Little People of America hopes that movie audiences, Martin Scorsese, and Leonardo DiCaprio join us in condemning dwarf tossing and the threatening behavior it promotes." In the book The Wolf of Wall Street that the film is based on, the tossing of little people is only discussed as a possibility and Belfort said (through a representative) that he merely heard from several people that they were thrown sometime after he left the firm.

== See also ==
- Midget wrestling
