= Coconut shy =

Funfair game

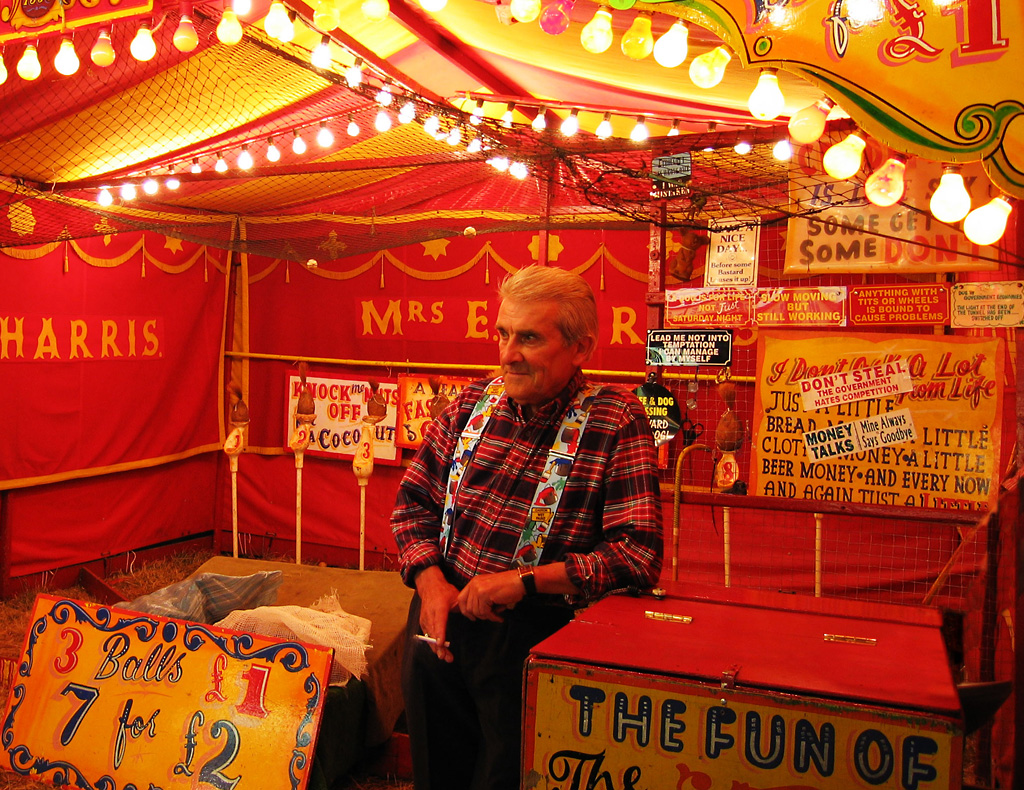
A traditional coconut shy run by Albert Harris. This particular stall was established by his mother, Mrs E. Harris, in 1936.

A coconut shy (or coconut shie) is a traditional British game frequently found as a sidestall at funfairs and fêtes. The game consists of throwing wooden balls at a row of coconuts balanced on posts. Typically a player buys three balls and wins when each coconut is successfully dislodged. In some cases other prizes may be won instead of the coconuts.

The word "shy" in this context means to toss or throw.

== Origins ==
The origins of the game are unclear, but early references to it appear in the late 1800s. It probably derives from the game of Aunt Sally, with coconuts being seen as an exotic prize in the late 19th century and into the 20th century. The National Fairground Archive holds a photograph of a coconut shy dating from 1890. The game is mentioned by Graham Greene in The Ministry of Fear in 1943, H. G. Wells in The Invisible Man in 1897, by E. Nesbit in The Story of the Treasure Seekers in 1899, and by P.G. Wodehouse in the short story "The Purity of the Turf". The term is first listed in the Oxford English Dictionary in 1903.

One theory suggests the coconut shy may have originated at the annual Pleasure Fair in Kingston upon Thames in 1867. That event took place on the town's Fairfield, not far from a coconut fibre mill on the Hogsmill river. The Surrey Comet reported how "for the small sum of one penny, you could have three throws with sticks with the prospect of getting a cocoa nut..." The coconuts could have come from nearby Middle Mill, which advertised in the Surrey Comet as "The Patent Cocoa Fibre Co Ltd the only cocoa nut fibre manufactory in Surrey. All descriptions of mats in cocoa nut fibre made to order wholesale". Today the only reminder of Kingston's association with coconuts is a pub in Mill Street, which was the principal route between Fairfield and Middle Mill for several centuries. Called "The Cocoanut", it is not only spelled the old way but is furthermore the only pub in Britain with that name.

However, there is a similar game shown in etchings by Thomas Rowlandson. Sketch on York Race Ground (1804) shows a carnival game in which sticks are thrown at various shaped objects atop posts; the drawing was etched and printed in 1805 titled Gaffers at a Country Fair, and a revised version was printed in 1808 titled Doncaster Fair the Industrious Yorkshirebites. An image in the lower left corner of A Prospect of Greenwich Fair, from Manners and Cvstoms of ye Englyshe in 1849, no 13, Getty Images, shows the same game with taller poles and the coconuts shown atop them.

According to a source described as an official from the Showman's Guild, coconut shies began at the Cambridge Midsummer Fair with cockerels as the targets rather than coconuts.

== Other countries ==
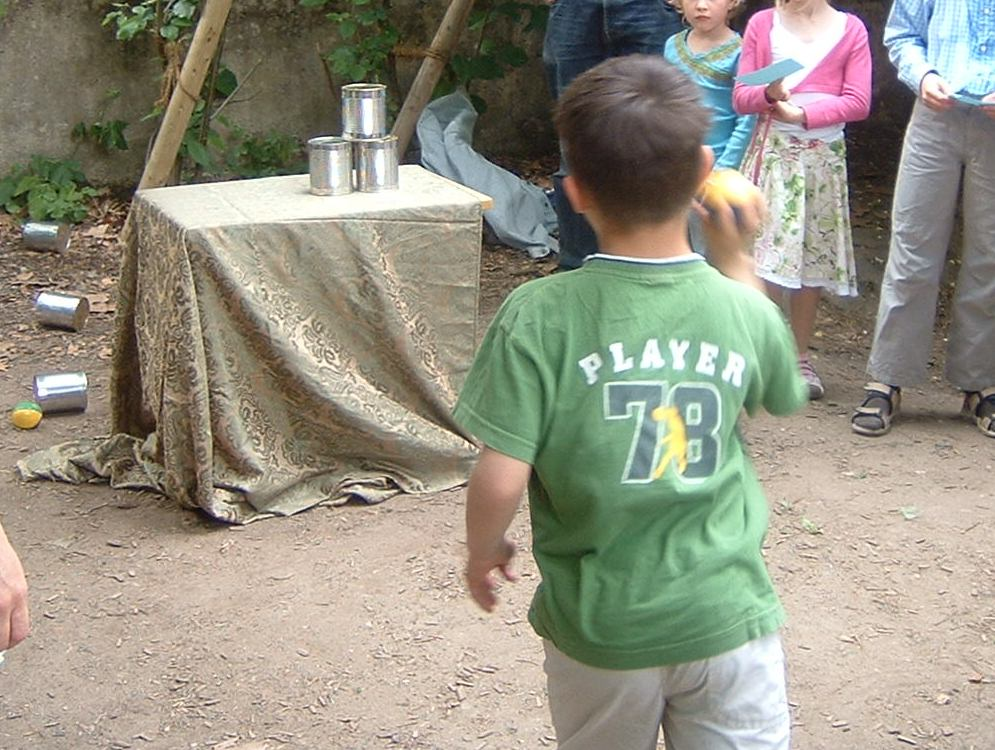
German Dosenwerfen

In German-speaking countries the game of Dosenwerfen (throw cans) is popular for school parties, as well as in professional stalls at fairgrounds. It involves throwing balls at stacks of empty tin cans.

In France, a similar game known as Chamboule-Tout is frequently found at fun fairs.

In the U.S. and Canada, milk cans are commonly used.

== See also ==
- British folk sports
