= Aunt Sally =

Traditional English pub game

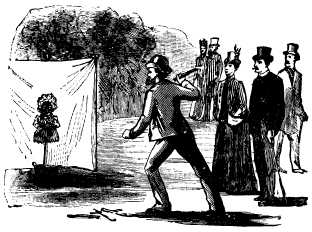
A game of "Aunt Sally". Drawing from the 1911 edition of Whiteley's General Catalogue.

Aunt Sally is a traditional English game usually played in pub gardens and fairgrounds, in which players throw sticks or battens at a ball, known as a 'dolly', balanced on top of a stick; traditionally, a model of an old woman's head was sometimes used. Leagues of pub teams still play the game, throughout the spring and summer months, mainly in Oxfordshire and some bordering counties. In France, the game is called jeu de massacre ("game of carnage").

The term Aunt Sally is also used for an argument or idea that is easily refutable and set up to invite criticism, equivalent to "straw man."

== Etymology ==
It was suggested by James Redding Ware that the term was based on a blackface doll, itself inspired by a low-life character named "Black Sal," which appeared in an 1821 novel entitled Life in London by Pierce Egan, a contemporary of Charles Dickens.

== History ==
The game dates back to the 17th century, although the name "Aunt Sally" may have been a later addition. It was traditionally played in central English pubs and fairgrounds. An Aunt Sally was originally the modelled head of an old woman with a clay pipe in her mouth; the object was for players to throw sticks at the head in order to break the pipe. The target has also been a puppet, live person, or a simple ball on a stick.

There are also other theories of how the game started. One such theory is that a live cockerel was placed on the stick, and people would throw sticks at it. Whoever killed it won the game and took home the chicken. Another theory is that in Port Meadow in Oxfordshire, at the time of the English Civil War, the Cavaliers (soldiers loyal to King Charles I) were bored and formed a game with sticks and makeshift materials similar to the game as understood today.

The game has also been played outside of the UK; picnic attendees were reported to play Aunt Sally in Australia in the 1880s.

Today, the game of Aunt Sally is still played as a pub game in Berkshire, Buckinghamshire, Gloucestershire, Oxfordshire, Northamptonshire and Warwickshire.

In 2011 the inaugural Aunt Sally Singles World Championship took place at the Charlbury Beer Festival in Charlbury, West Oxfordshire. Among the attendees was Prime Minister David Cameron. The tournament has continued there annually ever since.

On 24 August 2019, the first world championship for Aunt Sally pairs was held in the Bull, Launton, Oxfordshire, and was won by the pub team from The Bell, Bicester. Darren Moore and Billy Craig were the winners. Runners-up were Aimee Sheehan and Christopher Hulme.

== Modern rules ==
The game bears some resemblance to a coconut shy or skittles but with teams. Each team consists of eight players or five players depending on the local league.

The ball is on a short plinth about 4 to 6 inches (100 to 150 mm) high by 3 inches (75 mm) diameter, known as the "dolly", which is placed on a dog-legged metal spike (the swivel) about 30 to 40 inches (750 mm to 1000 mm) high. Players throw sticks or short battens, about 18 by 2 inches (450 x 50 mm) at the dolly, from ten yards away, trying to knock it off without hitting the spike. Successfully hitting the dolly off is known as a "doll"; however, if the spike is hit first, then the score does not count and is called an "iron". A zero score (after 6 sticks are thrown) is known as a "blob" and marked with an X on the scoreboard. If all legs are a blob the person is a "blobber".

== Cultural references ==
=== In literature ===
- G.K. Chesterton, in his anti-German book The Crimes of England (1915), refers to the wooden likeness of Paul von Hindenburg (described above) as a "wooden Aunt Sally".
- E. Nesbit, in Chapter VIII of the children's book Five Children and It (1902), describes a country fair: "There were some swings, and a hooting-tooting blaring merry-go-round, and a shooting-gallery and Aunt Sallies".
- In the 1979 television adaptation of Worzel Gummidge, the character of Aunt Sally (played by Una Stubbs) was reimagined by writers Keith Waterhouse and Willis Hall as a life-size fairground doll of the type traditionally used in the throwing game, rather than the character's original book lore where she was simply Worzel's aunt.

== See also ==
- African dodger, a carnival game in the United States with a live person as the target
- British folk sports
- PEMDAS (Please Excuse My Dear Aunt Sally), the order of mathematical operations
- Scapegoat
- Straw man
- The Adventures of Huckleberry Finn (1884) by Mark Twain, in which Aunt Sally is a character who attempts to adopt and "sivilize" Huck
- Whipping boy
