= Robert Dover (Cotswold Games) =

English attorney, author and wit

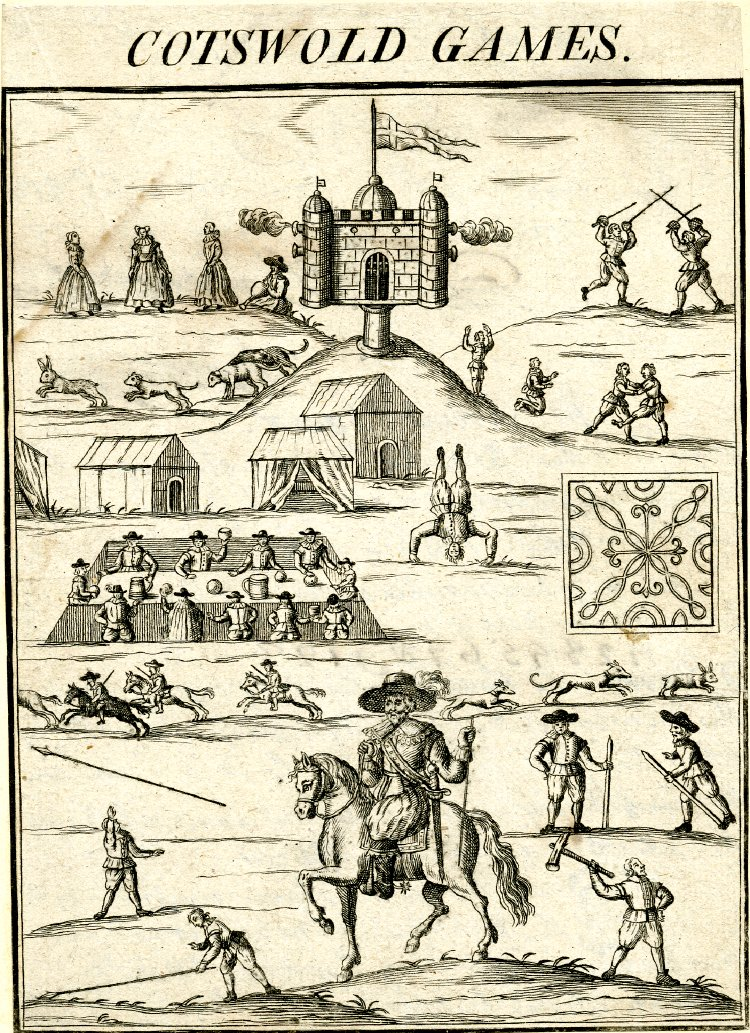
A 1636 woodcut showing Dover on horseback presiding over his Olimpick Games

Robert Dover (1575/82–1652) was an English attorney, author and wit, best known as the founder and for many years the director of the Cotswold Olimpick Games.

== Family ==
Robert was probably born between 1575 and 1582 in Norfolk, one of four children sired by a John Dover, but as the parish registers in Great Ellingham did not begin until 1630 it is impossible to be certain.

In 1610, Dover married Sibilla Sanford, daughter of William Cole, Dean of Lincoln and widow of John Sanford of Stow on the Wold; they had two sons (Robert, died in infancy, and John, 1614–1696) and two daughters (Sibella and Abigail).

== Education and professional life ==
Dover was a scholar at the University of Cambridge in 1595, possibly as a sizar at Queens' College: during his time at Cambridge the "Gog Magog Games" were held on the Gog Magog Hills outside Cambridge, although it is not known whether these were already being termed "Olympik" as was the case by 1620.

Dover left university early to avoid swearing the Oath of Supremacy; and a "Robert Dover" was among those questioned by Lord Burghley's officers looking for recusants in Norfolk.

On 27 February 1605, Dover was admitted to Gray's Inn, and was probably called to the bar in 1611.

Dover was known as a wit, and author of a lost poem The Wandering Jew: according to Peter Heylin, a pageant put on at Gray's Inn.

In 1611, he moved to Saintbury, near Chipping Campden.

After the inauguration of the Games, he obtained patronage from neighbour Endymion Porter, a well-connected courtier, who arranged for Dover to receive a cast-off set of royal garments to wear while presiding. Later in life he moved to Barton-on-the-Heath.

== Cotswold Olimpick Games ==
Dover founded his annual Games held in the Cotswold hills above Chipping Campden in about 1612, and presided over them for forty years. A mixture of courtly and folk events, the Cotswold Olimpicks were so named in Annalia Dubrensia, one of a series of literary celebrations of the events.

The games consisted of cudgel-playing, shin-kicking, wrestling, running at the quintain, jumping, casting the bar and hammer, hand-ball, gymnastics, rural dances and games and horse-racing, the winners in which received valuable prizes.

The Games, interrupted by the outbreak of the English Civil War in 1642, revived after the Restoration, and continued until 1852. They were revived, once more, in 1951.

== Death ==
Robert Dover was buried at Barton on 24 July 1652 (the date of 6 June 1641 appears to be a mistake).

== Remembered ==
There is a monument to Robert Dover at Dover's Hill, near Aston-sub-Edge.

== See also ==
- Cotswold Olimpick Games – Annual celebration of sports and games
- Shin-kicking – English combat sport
- Wenlock Olympian Games – Sporting event
