= Welly wanging =

Sport involving throwing a Wellington boot

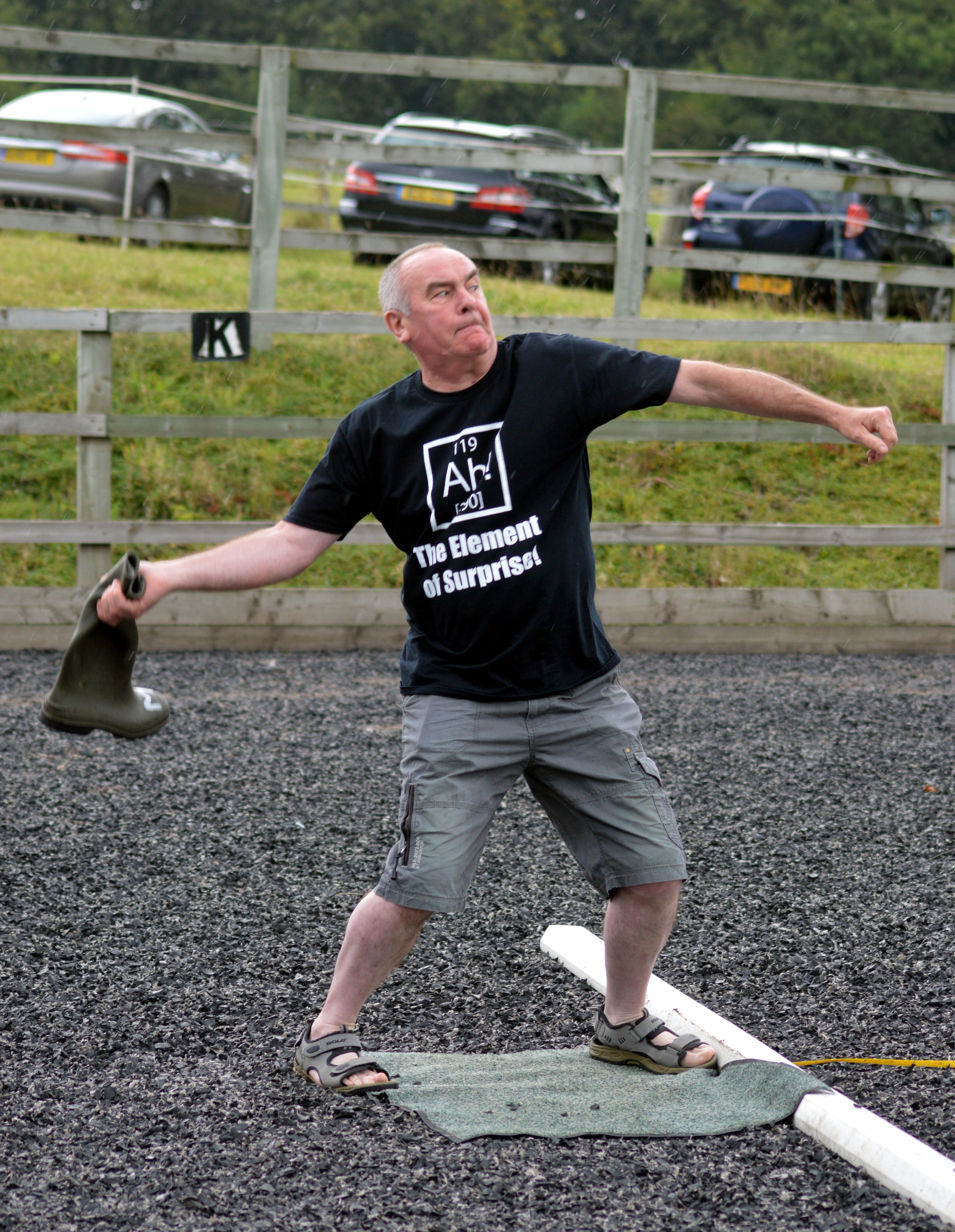
Welly throwing

Welly throwing, also known as welly hoying, welly wanging and boot throwing, is a sport in which competitors are required to throw a Wellington boot as far as possible. The sport appears to have originated in the West Country of England in the 1970s, and rapidly became a popular activity at village fêtes and fundraising events across Britain.

== Rules ==
Depending on local custom, different rules are applied to the sport. In parts of Somerset, for example, the boot is filled with water before being thrown. Some competitions allow a run up before releasing the boot, while others require the throw to be made from a standing position—which may be enforced by making the thrower stand in an empty dustbin. In Welbury, North Yorkshire, the size of the boot thrown must be large enough to comfortably fit the foot of the thrower. Other competitions, such as the Upperthong Welly Wanging Championships specify the size of the boot and the manufacturer.

== Associations ==
A number of associations have been formed to govern the sport, including the International Boot Throwing Association (based in Helsinki, Finland), the World Welly Wanging Association (Upperthong, UK), the World Welly Throwing Association (Settle, UK), the World Wellington Boot Throwing Association (Wellington, UK) and the New Zealand Boot Throwing Association (Taihape, New Zealand).

== Records ==
The first world record throw recognised by Guinness World Records was 52.73 metres (173.0 ft), set by Tony Rogers in Wiltshire, UK, in 1978, using a size 8 Dunlop "Challenger" boot. The current world records are 63.98 metres (209.9 ft) for men, set by Teppo Luoma of Finland in 1996, and 40.87 metres (134.1 ft) for women set by Sari Tirkkon, also of Finland and also in 1996.

== Gumboot day ==
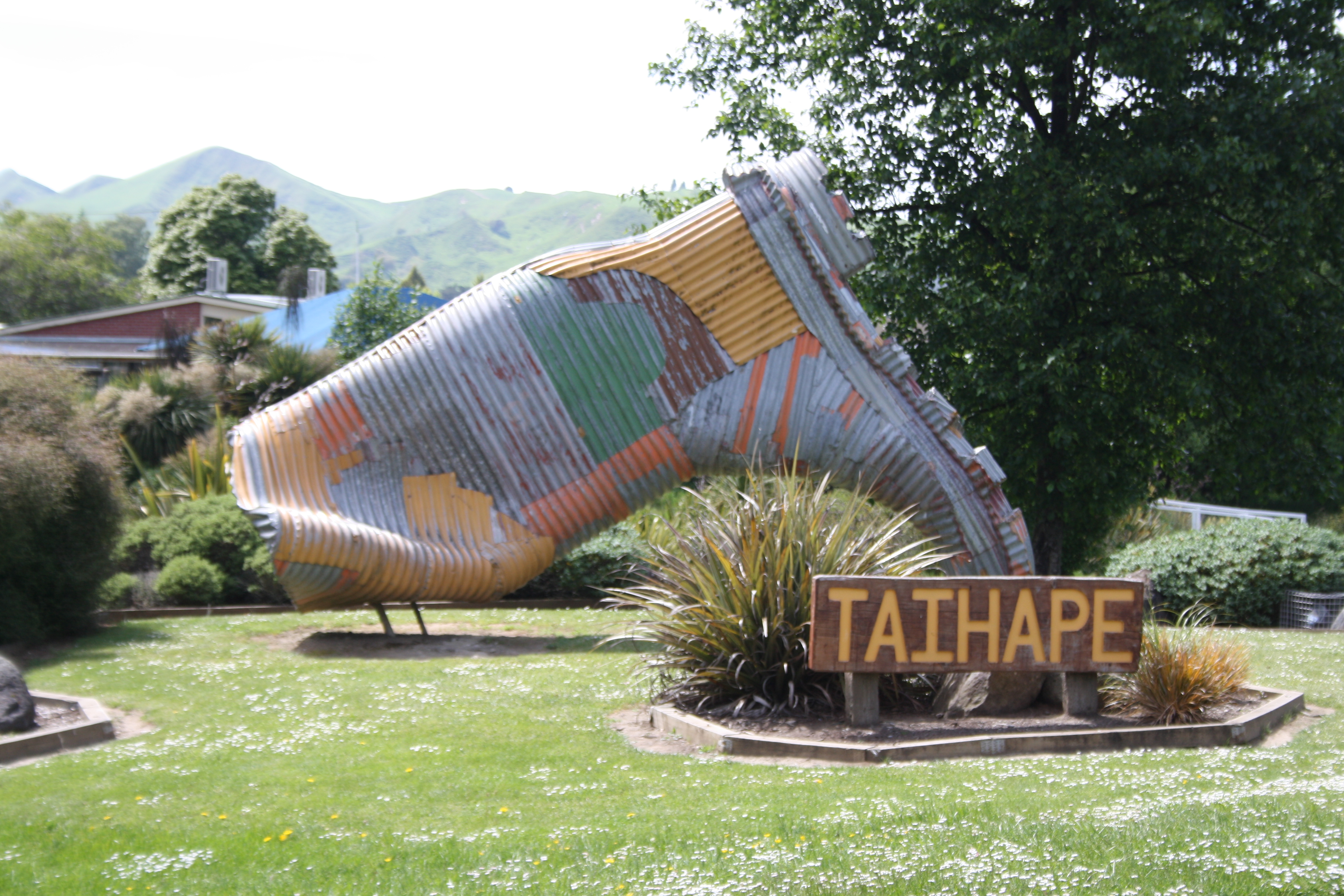
Gumboot Monument at the entrance to Taihape

Gumboot Day is a celebration in Taihape, in New Zealand. It occurs the Tuesday after Easter, and has been a regular event since 1985. It is a celebration of all things to do with gumboots, and includes the gumboot throwing contest.

The aim of the festival is to break the world record for the longest gumboot throw. It is a family event, which includes a number of other competitions such as the best-dressed gumboot and 'shoot the loop' with gumboots. Gumboots can also be tossed skyward on any day of the year in the official Gumboot throwing lane located in the 'Outback', just behind Taihape's main shopping centre.

In 2019, a mental health care fundraiser was held on Gumboot Day.

== See also ==
- List of rural sports and games
- Shoe tossing
- World Black Pudding Throwing Championships
