= Haggis hurling =

Scottish sport

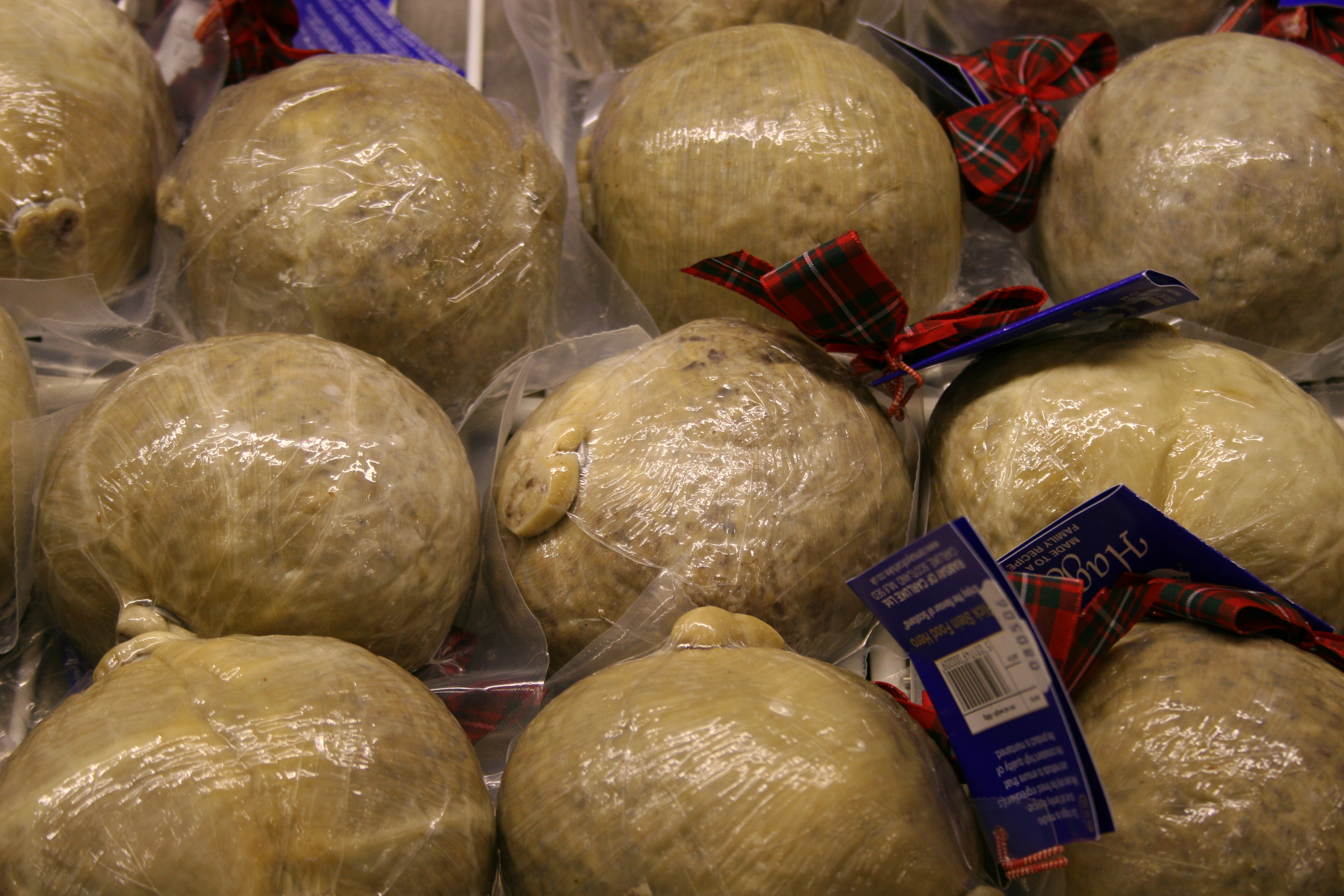
Haggis displayed for sale

Haggis hurling is a Scottish sport involving the hurling of a haggis as far as possible, for distance and accuracy.

== Background ==
Although its proponents often claim an ancient origin, haggis hurling is actually a very recent invention. In 2004 Robin Dunseath, publicist for Scottish entrepreneur Tom Farmer and ex-president of the World Haggis Hurling Association, said he invented the sport as a practical joke for the 1977 Gathering of the Clans in Edinburgh, later using it to raise funds for charity at Highland games. It appeared on the BBC TV program That's Life! around that time, when many people would have realised it was basically a joke.

Two variations have developed: one enacted at festivals, the other a professional sport.

The present world record for haggis hurling was set at 217 feet (66 metres) by Lorne Coltart at the Milngavie Highland Games on 11 June 2011, beating Allan Pettigrew's 180-foot (55-metre) record which had stood for over twenty years. However, the Australian cricket player Tom Moody was purported to have thrown a haggis in 1989 over 230 feet (70 metres).

Modern haggis hurling is judged on the basis of distance and accuracy of the hurl and a split or burst haggis is immediately disqualified, as the haggis must be fit to eat after landing. The sport requires subtle technique rather than brute force, as the hurl must result in a gentle landing to keep the haggis skin intact.

Plans to use a fake haggis in a hurling competition at a Highland festival in Melbourne split purists from those who are fearful of the mess a high-speed impacting may cause.

== Rules and regulations ==
The haggis must be of traditional construction, consisting of a tender boiled sheep's heart, lung and liver with spices, onions, suet and oatmeal and stock stuffed in a sheep's paunch, boiled for three hours.

At the time of hurling the haggis should be cooled and inspected to ensure no firming agents have been applied. Rules dictate that the haggis must be packed tight and secure, with no extra skin or flab.

The sporting haggis weighs 500 grams, with a maximum diameter of 18 cm and length of 22 cm. An allowance of ±30 grams is given and this weight is used in both junior and middle weight events.

The heavyweight event allows haggis up to 1 kg in weight, but the standard weight of 850 grams is more common, with an allowance of ±50 grams.

== Events ==
There is a World Haggis Hurling Championship.

Garry McClay from Kilmarnock is the current world champion. His furthest recorded throw which was covered by ITV on the day was 220ft at Ellisland Farm in Dumfries. https://www.facebook.com/share/v/1BvUG62kBf/

There is also a Canadian Haggis Hurling Championship in Perth, Ontario. The event is held in conjunction with the Perth World Record Kilt Run. The Canadian event in Perth is said to be the largest competition in the world, with over 140 measured competitors in 2013. The 2014 competition had 571 registered Hurlers. The competition in Perth uses M.P. Survey company and their precise laser equipment to measure the finals.

In 2004, a Highland festival in Melbourne made plans to use a fake haggis in a hurling competition there.

On 31 December 2021 the first Belgian competition was organised in the South of Deurne (Antwerp).

== See also ==
- British folk sports
- Fox tossing
- Dwarf-tossing
