= Barton-on-the-Heath =

Village in Warwickshire, England

Coordinates: 51.992°N 1.627°W

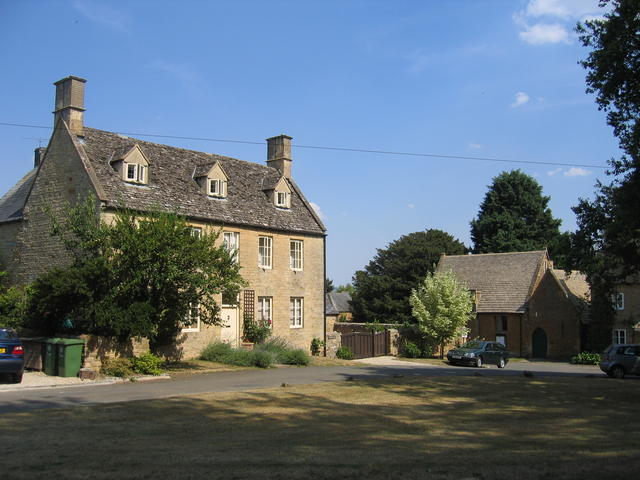
- A house in the heart of the village

- Location within Warwickshire
- Population: 85 (2001 census)
- Civil parish: Barton-on-the-Heath
- District: Stratford-on-Avon
- Shire county: Warwickshire
- Region: West Midlands
- Country: England
- Sovereign state: United Kingdom
- Police: Warwickshire
- Fire: Warwickshire
- Ambulance: West Midlands

Barton-on-the-Heath is a village and civil parish in the Stratford-on-Avon district of Warwickshire, England. According to the 2001 census the parish had a population of 85. From the Census 2011 population details are included in the neighbouring civil parish of Little Compton. The village is in the extreme south of Warwickshire, close to the borders with Gloucestershire and Oxfordshire. There is a church, dedicated to St Lawrence.

Robert Dover, organizer of the Cotswold Olimpick games, died at Shirley Farm, Barton in July 1652. His grandson, the lawyer and playwright, John Dover, was born there in October 1644.

Thomas Dover was born here in 1660.
