= World Gravy Wrestling Championships =

Sporting event

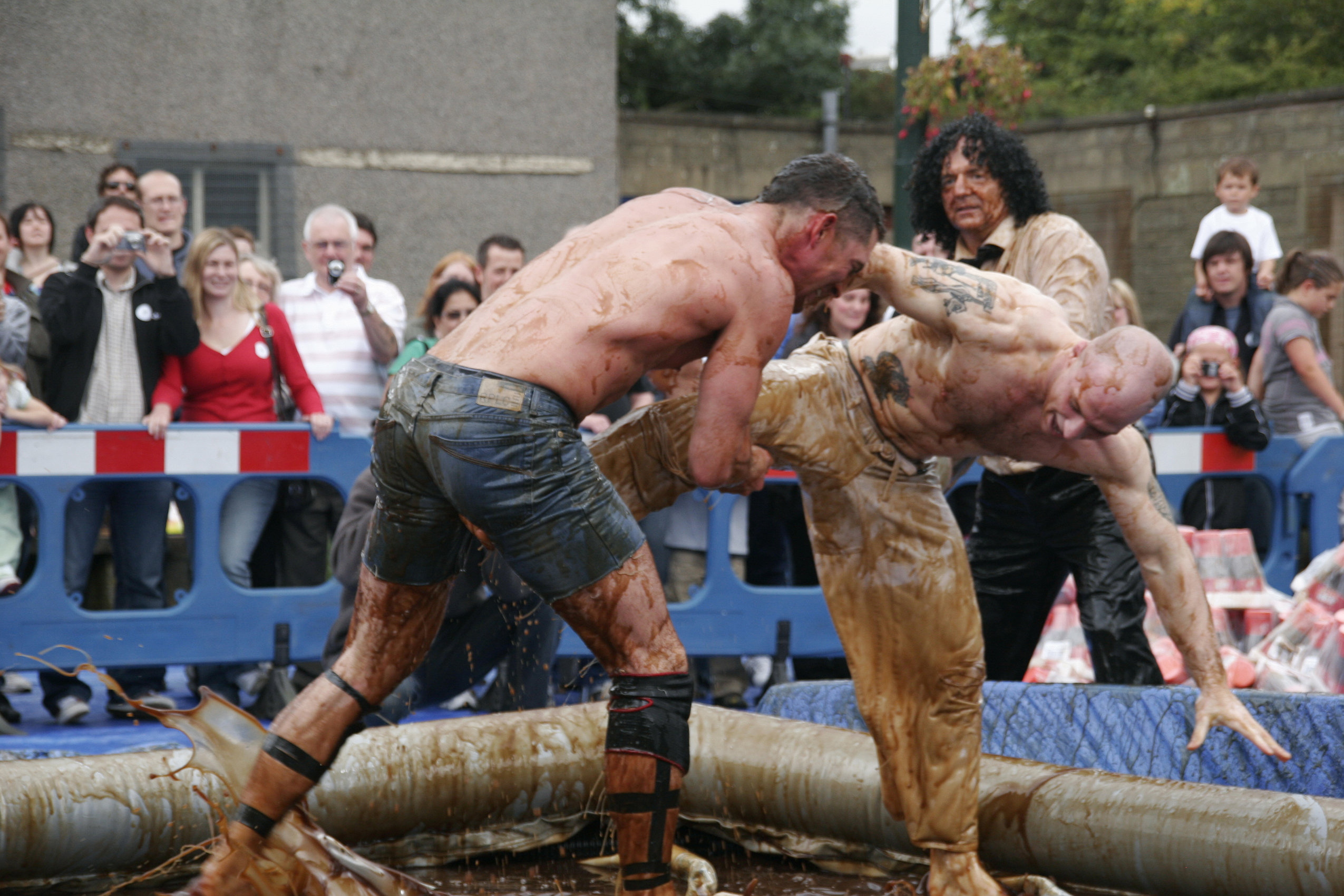
Joel Hicks (aka Stone Cold Steve Bisto) wrestling Danny Carr at the 2009 event

The World Gravy Wrestling Championships is an annual event held in the village of Stacksteads, Lancashire. The first championship was held in 2007.

Bouts last two minutes, and participants wrestle a shallow pool filled with "Lancashire Gravy". This was initially an actual gravy prepared with meat juices and vegetables, but after it was found to attract wasps it was replaced with a mixture of cornflour and caramel colouring.

Bout winners are decided not only on their wrestling skills, but also whether the participant has a better fancy dress costume.

Money raised by the Championship is donated to local charitable organisations.

Video clips from the 2010 event was featured on Australian television on The Footy Show in 2017, with a discussion about Aussie Rules ex-player panelists that should feature in it. Gravy wrestling championship results were included in the Guinness World Records in 2019.

== See also ==
- World Black Pudding Throwing Championships
