= Gog Magog Games =

Historic sports event in England

The Gog Magog Games or Gog Magog Olympiks were held annually on the Gog Magog Hills outside Cambridge, England in the 16th and 17th century.

The games were held in the 16th and 17th century outside Cambridge. In 1574 Cambridge University issued an edict against students taking part in the games. By 1620 they were being referred to as "Olympik" by Symonds D'Ewes.

Robert Dover, founder and for many years the director of the Cotswold Olimpick Games, was a scholar at the University of Cambridge in 1595, possibly as a sizar at Queens' College: although it is not known whether the term "Olympik" was already in use for the Games.

== See also ==
- Wenlock Olympian Games
