= Charlbury Riverside Festival =

Music festival in Oxfordshire, England

The Charlbury Riverside Festival is a regular open-air music festival held in the Cotswold town of Charlbury, Oxfordshire, England, on an area of watermeadow which forms an 'island' in the River Evenlode. First held in 1996 it is the largest free festival of its type in Oxfordshire. As well as live music there are stands selling a variety of merchandise, and a beer tent. The festival did not take place in 2006 due to incidents involving the police at the previous year's event, but the festival made a return in 2007.
