= World Aunt Sally Open Singles Championship =

The World Aunt Sally Open Singles Championship (WASOSC) is an annual competition that takes place at the Charlbury Beer Festival in Charlbury, West Oxfordshire. Aunt Sally is a traditional English throwing game played in pub gardens or fairgrounds dating back to the 17th century, in which players throw sticks or battens at a model of an old woman's head. The tournament is a knock out competition for individuals, with the winner's name then engraved onto the Finings Cup Trophy. The 2025 event attracted a record number of 91 competitors, players travel from as far afield as Germany.

The event returned in June 2022, after being cancelled for 2 years because of the COVID-19 pandemic.

The most recent event took place on Saturday 27th June 2026 at Charlbury Cricket Club, during the Charlbury beer festival. The winner for the 5th time, was defending champion Roger Goodall, meaning only 8 players have had the honour to lift the trophy in the tournament's 16 year history.

== WASOSC Rules ==
The World Aunt Sally Open Singles Championship is open to individuals who participate in a knock out competition. Before the competition starts, names are drawn from a hat to determine the order of play. Games consist of 3 legs, where in each leg the players take 6 throws, where a point is awarded when the stick hits the doll before the iron. If tied after 3 legs, players throw 3 sticks each to determine the winner. Should the scores remain level after those 3 sticks, a sudden-death round, throwing a single stick at a time, to a winning result. The victor proceeds to the next round. Otherwise, normal Aunt Sally league rules apply and players must abide by the umpire's decision.

== David Cameron video ==
- Prime minister David Cameron opens the inaugural 2011 Aunt Sally Singles World Championship

== World Aunt Sally Open Singles Championship results (2011 onwards) ==
Year	Date	Winner	Region	Runner-up	Region
2011	28 June	Trevor Dyer	(Gloucestershire) Churchill Arms, Paxford, Gloucs	George Williams	Charlbury Town FC, Oxfordshire
2012	14 July	Steve McAteer	(Gloucestershire) Churchill Arms, Paxford, Gloucs	Graham Barrett	(Gloucestershire) Fox 'A' Broadwell, Cotswolds, Gloucs
2013	29 June	Steve McAteer	(Gloucestershire) Churchill Arms, Paxford, Gloucs	Roger Goodall	(Oxfordshire) Black Prince, Woodstock, Oxon
2014	28 June	Henry Johnson	(Oxfordshire) Black Prince, Woodstock, Oxon	Barry Parker	(Oxfordshire) Abingdon United, Oxon
2015	28 June	Roger Goodall	(Oxfordshire) Black Prince, Woodstock, Oxon	Graham Barrett	(Gloucestershire) Fox 'A' Broadwell, Cotswolds, Gloucs
2016	25 June	Barry Parker	(Oxfordshire) Abingdon United, Oxon	Darren Cave	(Northamptonshire) Butcher's Arms ‘B’, Kings Sutton, Northants
2017	24 June	Roger Goodall	(Oxfordshire) Black Prince, Woodstock, Oxon	Ian McAteer	(Gloucestershire) Churchill Arms, Paxford, Gloucs
2018	30 June	Kevin Powney	(Oxfordshire) Black Bull 'A', Launton, Bicester, Oxon	Karl Budd	(Oxfordshire) Black Bull 'A', Launton, Bicester, Oxon
2019	29 June	Phil Adams	(Oxfordshire) Abingdon, Oxon	Dick Walsh	(Oxfordshire) Swan 'A', Oxon
2020 & 2021		Event cancelled (COVID-19)		-	-
2022	25 June	Rob Bradford	(Oxfordshire) Black Prince, Woodstock, Oxon	Phil Adams	(Oxfordshire) Abingdon, Oxon
2023	24 June	Rob Bradford	(Oxfordshire) White House, Bladon, Oxon	Pete Rampton	(Oxfordshire) Red Lion B, Kidlington, Oxon
2024	29 June	Roger Goodall	(Oxfordshire) White House, Bladon, Oxon	Alan Goodgame	(Oxfordshire) Black Horse, Oxon
2025	28 June	Roger Goodall	(Oxfordshire) White House, Bladon, Oxon	Mark Poulter	(Oxfordshire) Yarnton B.L. Oxon
2026	27 June	Roger Goodall	(Oxfordshire) White House, Bladon, Oxon	Wayne Townsend	(Oxfordshire)

=== Multiple world singles champions ===
- Roger Goodall 5 - (2015), (2017), (2024), (2025), (2026)
- Steve McAteer 2 - (2012), (2013)
- Rob Bradford 2 - (2022), (2023)
