= Charlbury Museum =

Public museum in Oxfordshire, England

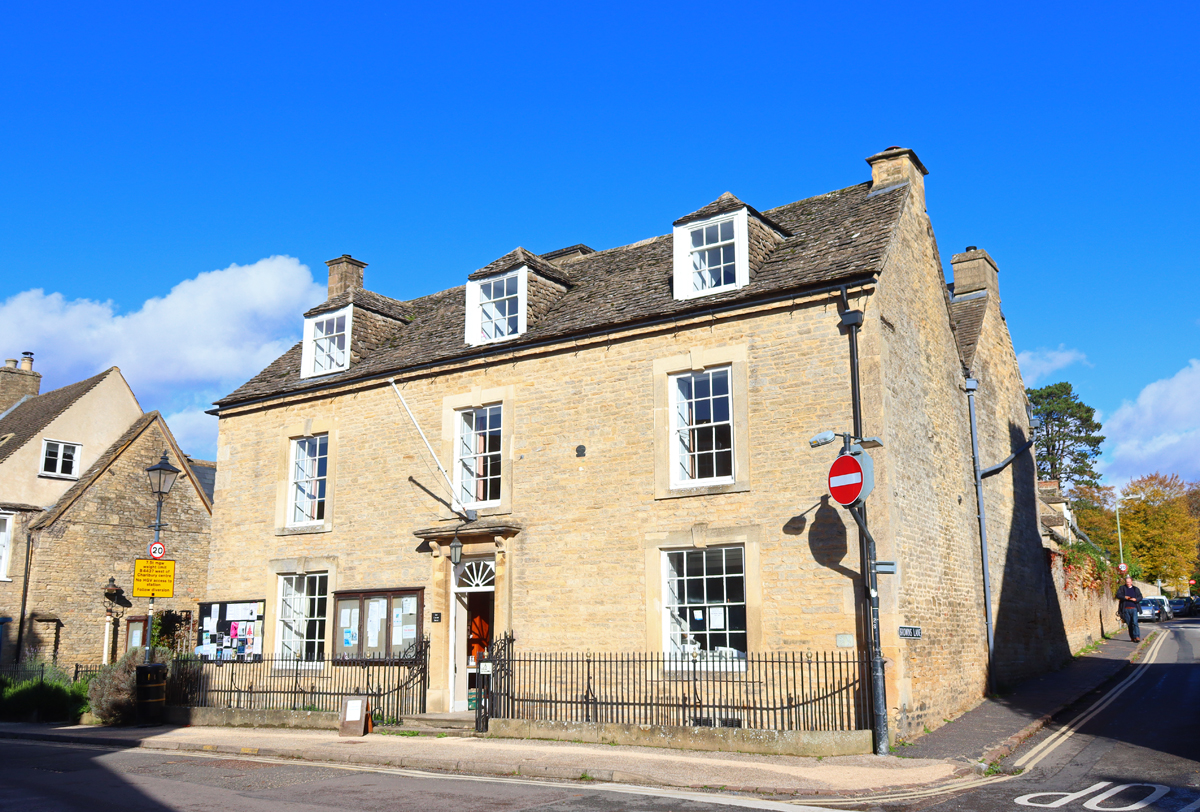
- View of the museum building
- Established: 1949 (collection); 1962 (current building)
- Location: Chalbury, Oxfordshire, England
- Coordinates: 51.8730°N 1.4824°W
- Type: Local museum
- Collections: 19th-century costumes, fossils, prehistoric objects, Romano-British artifacts
- Owner: Charlbury Society

Charlbury Museum is a local museum in the town of Charlbury, Oxfordshire, England. The museum and collections are organized and run by the Charlbury Society, which was founded in 1949.

The museum's displays present traditional crafts and industries of the town, including maps and photographs. The collection was started in 1949, and the museum opened in the current building in 1962. The museum's collections are housed in five rooms, including a newer entrance that was added in 2002. The galleries include exhibits of 19th-century costumes, fossils, prehistoric objects, and Romano-British artifacts. On the walls are pictures, shop/inn signs, local maps, and posters. There are copies of books by local authors, including Cornbury and the Forest of Wychwood by Vernon Watney. Items from local industries, such as glove-making are on display. Such industry was a feature of Charlbury for several centuries; the last factory closed in 1968. Also presented are a blacksmith's forge including bellows and a portable anvil, together with displays of tools used by carpenters, farmers, thatchers, and watchmakers. The museum has a garden, which was the site of the Star Inn, demolished in 1910. There is a lawn with flowerbeds.
