= Shin-kicking =

English combat sport

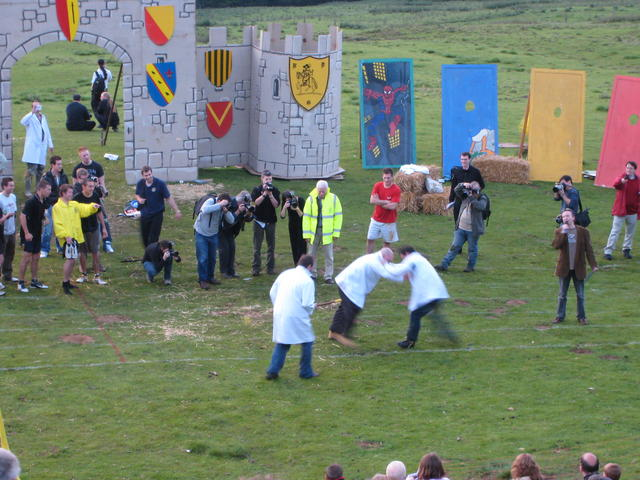
- A shin-kicking contest: Two men (in shepherds' smocks) grasp each other's shoulders and attempt to kick each other.
- Nicknames: Shin diggings; purring; clog fighting; sufficient
- First played: Early 17th century

Characteristics
- Contact: Semi-contact
- Team members: Individual
- Mixed-sex: No
- Type: Indoor; outdoor
- Equipment: Clogs or steel-toe boots

Presence
- Country or region: England
- Olympic: No
- Paralympic: No

Shin-kicking, also known as shin diggings or purring, is a combat sport that involves two contestants attempting to kick each other on the shin in order to force their opponent to the ground. It has been described as an English martial art, and originated in England in the early 17th century.

== History ==
It was one of the most popular events at the Cotswold Olimpick Games from 1612 until the Games ended in the 1850s. When the Games were revived, in 1951, the sport was included as the World Shin-Kicking Championships and remains one of its most popular events, drawing crowds of thousands of spectators.

Shin kicking also became a popular pastime among Cornish miners as a subset of Cornish wrestling. Known as clog fighting or 'purring' in the mill towns of Lancashire, it was a combative means of settling disputes popular in the later 19th century until the 1930s. Clog fighting and its associated gambling by spectators was illegal. In the late 19th and early 20th centuries, the sport was also practiced by British immigrants to the United States.

== Technique ==
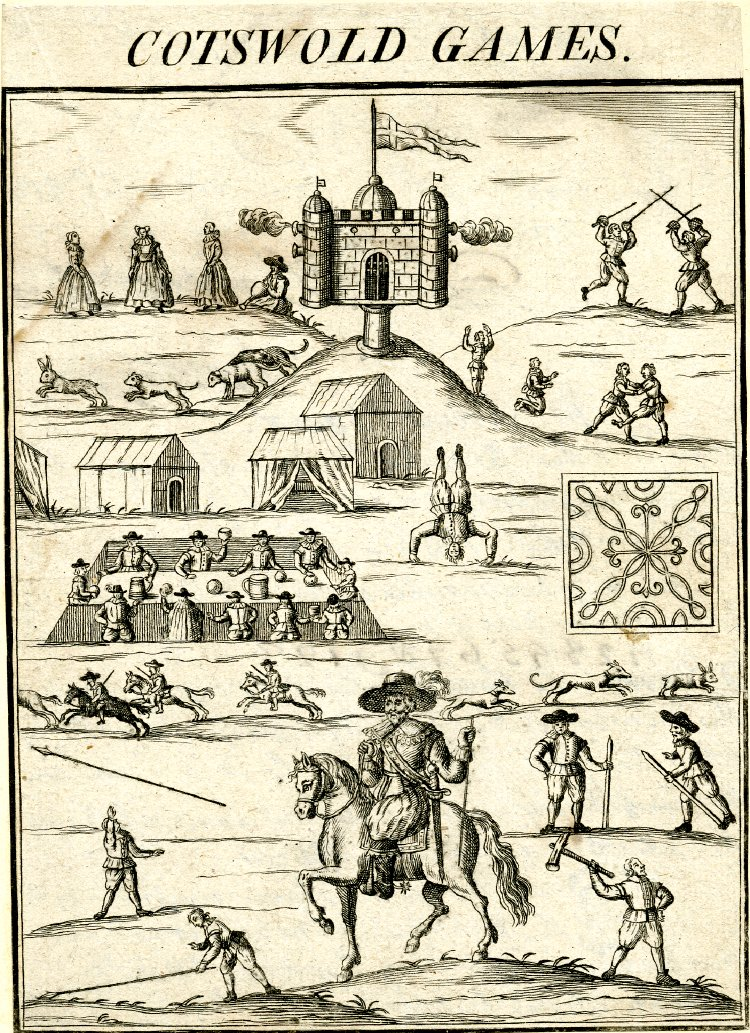
1636 woodcut of the Cotswold Olimpick Games. Two men are shin-kicking (near top right).

During each round, the combatants face each other and hold on to each other's collar or shoulders. Traditionally (in the Cotswold Olimpicks), they wear white coats, representing shepherds' smocks.

They typically attempt to strike their opponent's shin with the inside of the foot as well as their toes. Success in the event requires both agility and the ability to endure pain, the loser crying out "Sufficient" when he has had enough. The matches are observed by a referee, or stickler, who determines the score of the match. Modern competitions are won by the combatant who wins six out of ten against his competitor.

In modern competitions, the combatants are required to wear soft shoes and stuff their trouser legs with straw for padding. Ambulance crews also attend the events in case of injury.

== See also ==
- Clog (British) – Wooden soled footwear made in the United Kingdom
- Cotswold Olimpick Games – Annual celebration of sports and games
- Robert Dover (Cotswold Games) – English attorney, author and wit
- Wenlock Olympian Games – Sporting event

== Bibliography ==
- Drayton, Michael, et al. (1636), Annalia Dubrensia: upon the yearly celebration of Mr. Robert Dovers Olimpick Games upon Cotswold-Hills, London: Robert Raworth.
- Gandy, Rob (2021), "Bold Dover", The Fortean Times, FT408, (August 2021), pp.46-50.
