= Dwile flonking =

English pub game

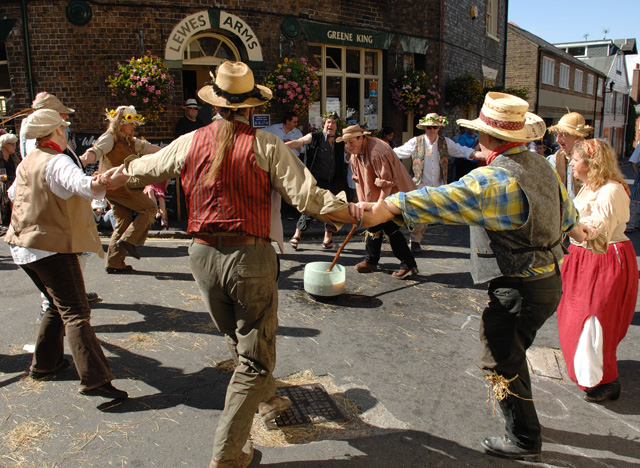
Dwile flonking at the Lewes Arms pub in Sussex

Dwile flonking, dwyle flunking, or nurdling is a British pub game played by two teams. One team dances around in a circle, while a player from the other team attempts to hit them by throwing a beer-soaked cloth. The game is associated with the counties of Norfolk and Suffolk. Although the game can supposedly be traced back to the 16th century, it is thought to have in fact been invented in the mid-1960s.

== History ==
The history of dwile flonking can supposedly be traced back to a manuscript of its rules from 1585. (Note: Different sources give the title of the manuscript as "Ye Olde Book of Suffolk Harvest Rituels" or the "Waveney Rules of 1585".) In 1966, following the supposed rediscovery of these rules in an attic, the game was allegedly revived for the summer fête in Beccles, Suffolk, by a group of apprentice printers. However, the Suffolk county archivist was unable to find any evidence for the game before 1966, and the supposed 1585 rules are a hoax. The game was in fact apparently invented for the Beccles fête.

Following the 1966 game, another game was filmed at Beccles by Pathé News, and dwile flonking was featured on the television programmes The Eamonn Andrews Show and Michael Bentine's All Square (Bentine called the game "nurdling"). For a period it became a popular pub game. It has been included in the Cotswold Olimpick Games, and dwile flonking continues to be played annually in Ufford and Beccles in Suffolk, and Lewes in Sussex.

== Gameplay ==
The game is played by two teams of twelve. One team form a circle and dance around in one direction. One member of the other team (the "flonker") stands in the centre of the circle and rotates in the opposite direction, holding a beer-soaked cloth ("dwile") on a pole. (Note: "dwile" is a genuine East Anglian dialect word for a dishcloth or mop; "flonk" and its derivatives are invented.) The flonker flings the cloth at the dancers, scoring points depending on where on the body they are hit; if they miss they must drink as a penalty. In 2010, a dwile flonking competition replaced this drinking penalty with non-alcoholic drinks, following a local council decision that it would violate licensing restrictions intended to prevent binge drinking.

== Works cited ==
- "Old pub game's speed-drinking ban in Norfolk". BBC. 28 May 2010.
- Collins, Tony; Martin, John; Vamplew, Wray (2005). Encyclopedia of Traditional British Rural Sports. Psychology Press.
- Cooper, Quentin; Sullivan, Paul (1994). Maypoles, Martyrs & Mayhem: 366 Days of British Customs, Myths and Eccentricities. Bloomsbury.
- "Ransom note for flonking prize". Eastern Daily Press. 31 August 2007.
- "Ufford: White Lion's beer festival to celebrate 20th annual 'dwile flonking' contest". East Anglian Daily Times. 20 August 2014. Archived from the original on 14 October 2025.
- Taylor, Arthur (2009). Played at the Pub: The Pub Games of Britain. English Heritage.
- Trudgill, Peter (11 February 2026). "Fakelore and the spurious pastime of dwile flonking". The New World.
- Wilks, Jon (2 March 2022). "Customs Uncovered: Dwile Flonking". Tradfolk.
- Williams, Victoria R. (2015). Weird Sports and Wacky Games from Around the World: From Bukzashi to Zorbing. Bloomsbury.
