= Fox tossing =

17th-18th century European blood sport

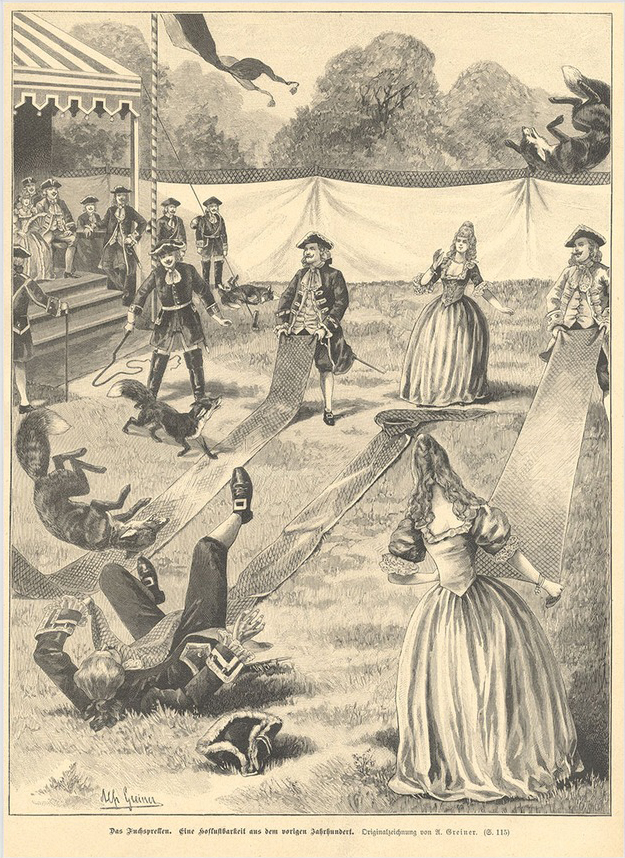
An engraving of German aristocrats engaged in the sport of fox tossing or Fuchsprellen (lit. "fox bouncing")

Fox tossing (German: Fuchsprellen) was a competitive blood sport popular in parts of Europe in the 17th and 18th centuries. It involved throwing live foxes and other animals high into the air. It was practiced by members of the aristocracy in an enclosed patch of ground or in a courtyard, using slings with a person on each end to catapult the animal upwards. It was particularly popular for mixed couples, even though it was hazardous for the people launching the animals as the animals would often turn on the participants. The result was often fatal for the tossed animals.

== Background ==
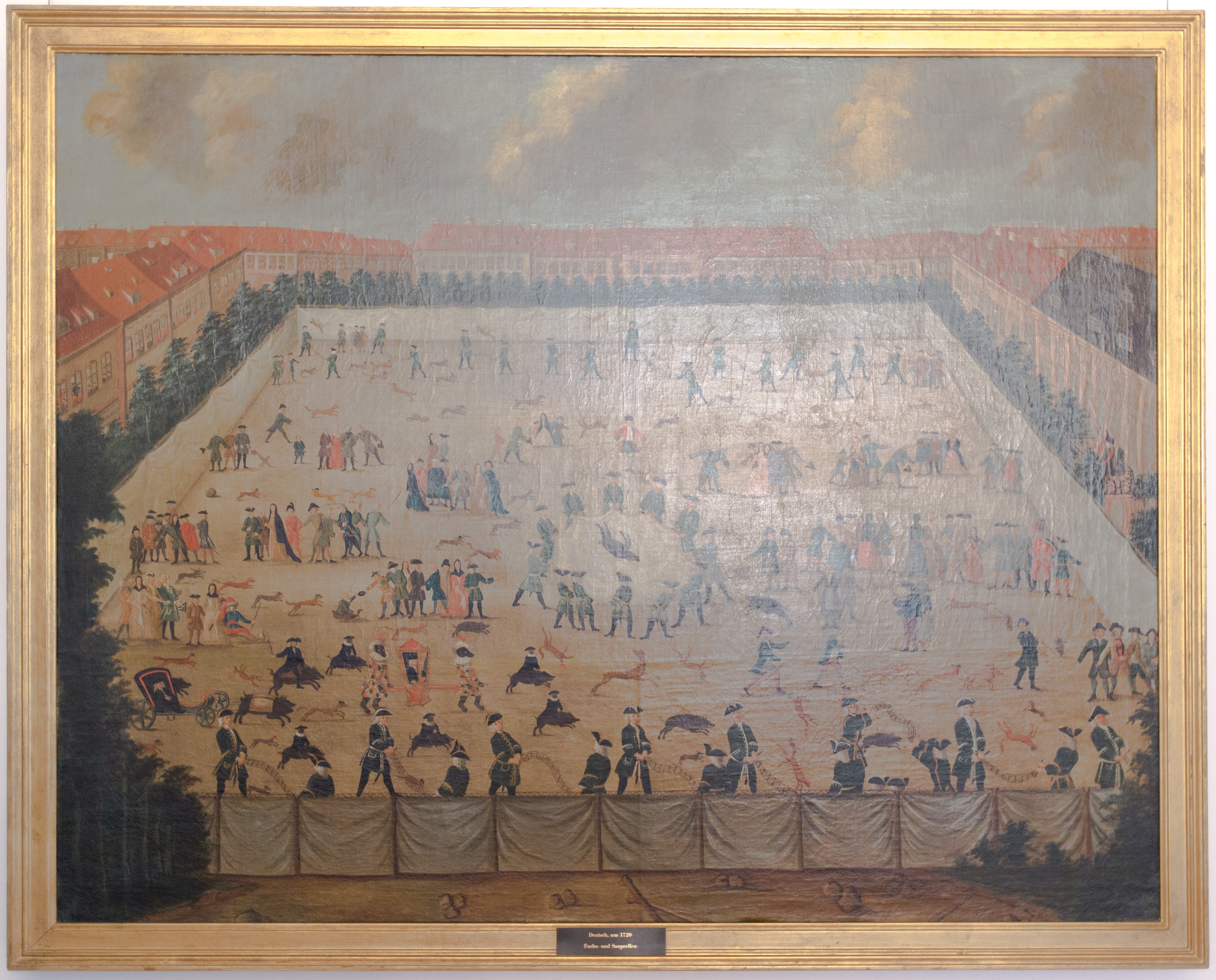
Fox and wild boar tossing. Painting from Jagdschloss Grunewald

Fox tossing would take place in an arena, usually either created by setting up a circle of canvas screens in the open or by using the courtyard of a castle or palace. Two people would stand six to seven-and-a-half metres (20 to 25 feet) apart, holding the ends of a webbed or cord sling known as a Prellgarn or Prelltuch ('bouncing cloth') which was laid flat on the ground. An animal such as a fox would then be released from a cage or trap and driven through the arena, across the sling. As it crossed the sling the participants pulled hard on the ends, throwing the animal high into the air. The highest throw would win the contest; expert competitors could achieve throws of as high as 7.5 m (24 ft). On occasion, several slings were laid in parallel, so that the animal would have to run the gauntlet of several teams.

The result was often fatal for the tossed animal. Augustus II the Strong, the King of Poland and Elector of Saxony, held a famous tossing contest in Dresden at which 647 foxes, 533 hares, 34 badgers and 21 wildcats were tossed and killed. Augustus himself participated, reportedly demonstrating his strength by holding the end of his sling by just one finger, with two of the strongest men in his court on the other end. Other rulers also participated in the sport. The Swedish envoy Esaias Pufendorf, witnessing a fox-tossing contest held in Vienna in March 1672, noted in his diary his surprise at seeing the Holy Roman Emperor Leopold I enthusiastically joining the court dwarfs and boys in clubbing to death the injured animals; he commented that it was remarkable to see the emperor having "small boys and fools as comrades, [which] was to my eyes a little alien from the imperial gravity."

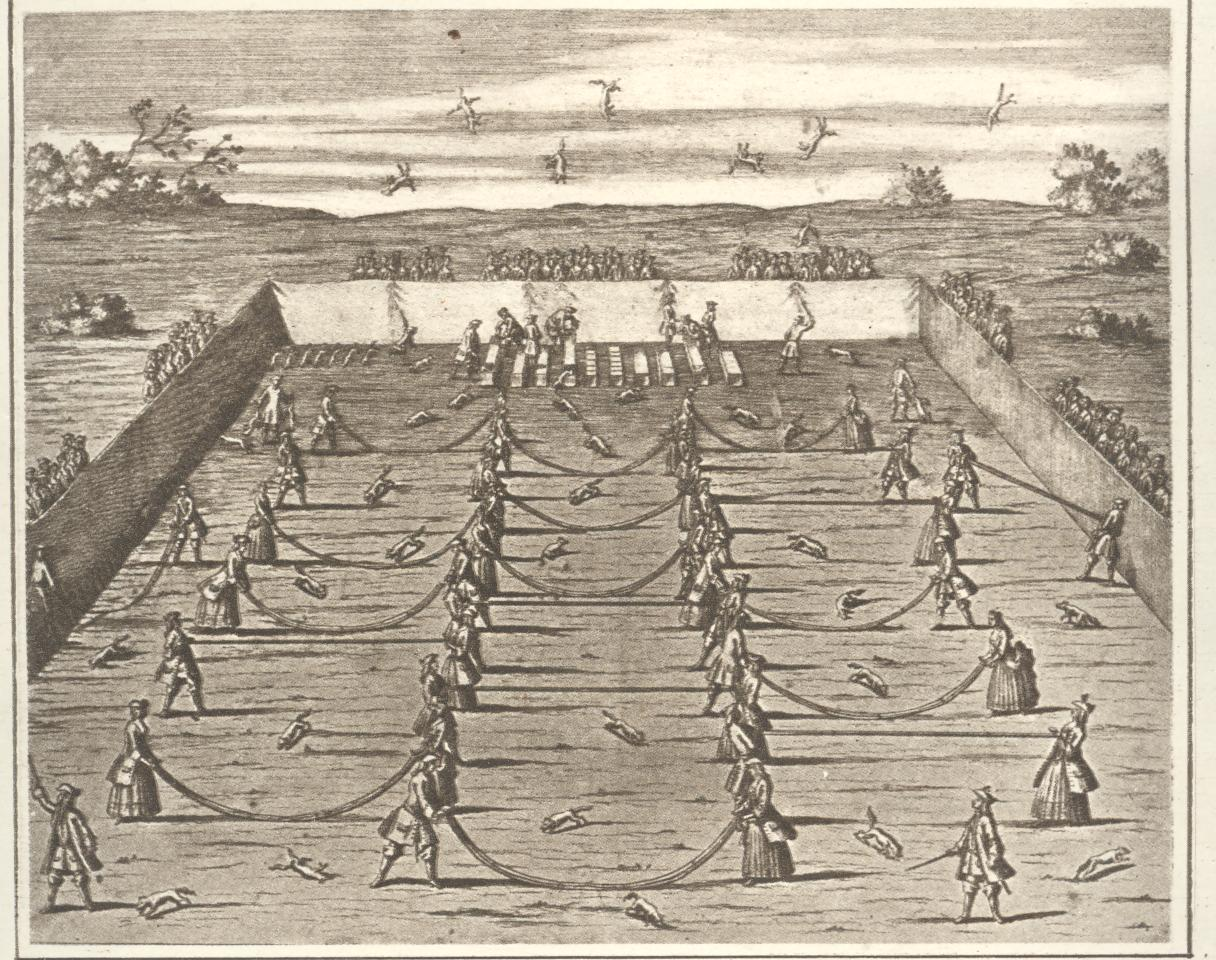
A fox-tossing tournament of the early 18th century, as depicted in Der vollkommene deutsche Jäger (1719)

The sport was especially popular as an activity for mixed couples, with the rivalry between the separate couples adding to the entertainment. At Augustus's 1648 contest, 34 boars were driven into the enclosure "to the great delectation of the cavaliers, but to the terror of the noble ladies, among whose hoop-skirts the wild boars committed great havoc, to the endless mirth of the assembled illustrious company." The same contest also saw the introduction of three wolves, but the reaction of the participants to this unusual departure is not recorded.

The tossing of foxes and other animals was not without risk to the participants, as it was common for the terrified animals to turn on the people taking part. Wildcats were particularly troublesome; as one writer remarked, they "do not give a pleasing kind of sport, for if they cannot bury their claws and teeth in the faces or legs of the tossers, they cling to the tossing-slings for dear life, and it is next to impossible to give one of these animals a skilful toss".

== Masquerade ==
On occasion, tossing formed part of a costumed masquerade in which the tossed animal as well as the participants would be decorated and masked. Gentlemen would dress as mythical heroes, Roman warriors, satyrs, centaurs or jesters. Ladies would dress as nymphs, goddesses or muses. The tossed animals—hares as well as foxes—would be "dressed up in bits of cardboard, gaudy cloth and tinsel", sometimes being decorated as caricatures of well-known individuals. At the conclusion of the tossing, the guests would head off in a torchlit procession or go indoors for a grand banquet.

== See also ==
- Bear baiting
- Bullfighting
- Cock throwing
- Cow tipping
- Fox hunting
- Goose pulling
- Haggis hurling
