= Charlbury =

Town in Oxfordshire, England

Coordinates: 51.872°N 1.482°W

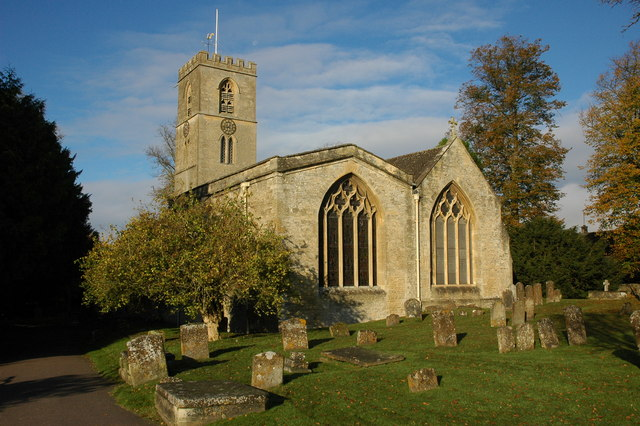
- St Mary's parish church from the southeast

- Location within Oxfordshire
- Population: 2,830 (2011 Census)
- OS grid reference: SP3519
- District: West Oxfordshire
- Shire county: Oxfordshire
- Region: South East
- Country: England
- Sovereign state: United Kingdom
- Post town: Chipping Norton
- Postcode district: OX7
- Dialling code: 01608
- Police: Thames Valley
- Fire: Oxfordshire
- Ambulance: South Central
- UK Parliament: Banbury
- Website: charlbury-tc.gov.uk

Charlbury (/ˈtʃɑːrlbəri, ˈtʃɔːrl-/) is a town and civil parish in the Evenlode valley, about 6 miles (10 km) north of Witney in the West Oxfordshire district of Oxfordshire, England. It is on the edge of Wychwood Forest and the Cotswolds. The 2011 Census recorded the parish's population as 2,830.

== Place name ==
Toponymic evidence suggests that Charlbury was an Anglo-Saxon settlement from an early date, and may be associated with 'Faerpinga in Middelenglum' listed in the Tribal Hidage of the 7th to 9th centuries. The name is a compound of two Old English elements. Burh is a fortified place. Ceorl (probably pronounced /tʃɔrl/) is a "freeman of the lowest class", but other sources suggest it was also a personal name. For this reason some hold the latter two pronunciations more valid than the former, and the current spelling not phonetic, preferring "Chorlbury". The similarity between "Ceorl" and the personal name Charles is no accident: "Charles", "ceorl" and "churl", along with the modern German name Karl derive from the same Proto-Germanic word *karlaz.

== Notable buildings ==
Lee Place (Grade II* listed), the former dower house of Ditchley is the home of Rosita Spencer-Churchill, Duchess of Marlborough. About one mile to the southwest, lies Cornbury Park (Grade I listed), owned by Lord Rotherwick, is a 17th-century country house designed partly by the architect Hugh May.

== Parish church ==
The Church of England parish church of St Mary the Virgin is by tradition associated with Saint Diuma, the 7th-century first Bishop of Mercia. By 1197 or 1198 the church belonged to Eynsham Abbey, which held the advowson of the parish until the Dissolution of the Monasteries in the 16th century, after which it passed to St John's College, Oxford. The arcade between the nave and north aisle is Norman. In the 13th century the building was greatly enlarged: the chancel was extended eastwards and the south aisle, west tower and north and south chapels were added. In the 14th century the present Decorated Gothic east windows of the chancel and south chapel were added. During or before the 15th century the north aisle was widened. In the 15th century Perpendicular Gothic additions were made to the building: the tower was extended higher and a west door was inserted in its base, a clerestory was added to the nave and new windows were inserted in both aisles.

In the 16th century the Perpendicular Gothic south porch was added. Two wooden galleries were added, possibly in the 18th century. In the 18th or early in the 19th century most of the windows lost their tracery. The church includes memorials to Elizabeth Norborne, Dowager Viscountess Hereford (d.1742). In 1856 the Gothic Revival architect G.E. Street had the galleries removed and the church refitted with new pews, and in 1874 the chancel was rebuilt to the designs of another Gothic Revival architect, Charles Buckeridge. Early in the 1990s an extensive reordering saw the pews removed and the main altar moved to the west end. The organ is a two-manual Wyvern digital instrument, installed in 2010 to replace a Makin digital in place since 1990. The bell tower has a ring of six bells, all cast in 1716 by Abraham I Rudhall of Gloucester plus a Sanctus bell cast by an unknown founder in about 1599.

== Religious Society of Friends ==
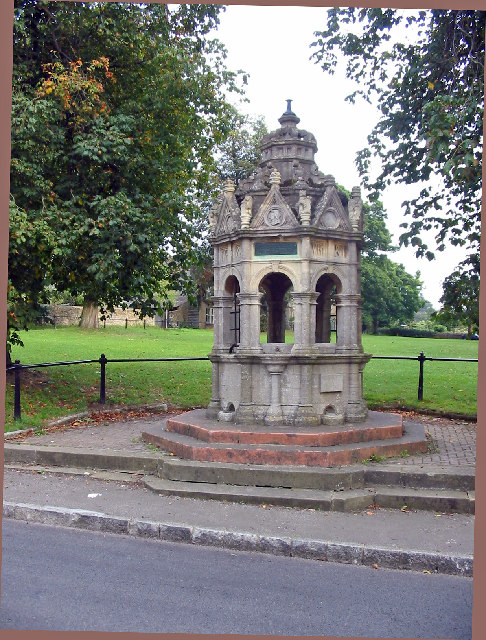
Jacobethan drinking fountain designed by John Kibble and erected in 1897 to commemorate the visit of Queen Victoria.

Quakerism reached Charlbury in the Commonwealth that followed the English Civil War. Anne Downer, the daughter of a former Vicar of Charlbury, joined the Religious Society of Friends in 1654. In 1655 she became the first Quaker woman preacher and the following year she preached in Chadlington. She preached at Charlbury, where Quaker meetings were held in the homes of two converts, William Cole and Alexander Harris. Many Quakers in Charlbury were distrained for refusing to pay the Church Rate. In 1660 a Chadlington Quaker who attended the Charlbury meetings was jailed for refusing to swear the Oath of Allegiance and in 1663 Henry Shad, a Quaker schoolmaster, was barred from teaching.

In 1669 about 30 members were meeting in Harris' house. In 1680 a meeting at Cole's house to hear Thomas Taylor, a preacher from the north of England, was so crowded that the local Quakers decided to build a meeting house. Quakers including Thomas Gilkes of Sibford Gower gave land on which a meeting house was built in 1681. By 1689 the meeting house had a burial ground, but early in the next century membership declined and for a time meetings were discontinued. In 1779 a new meeting house was built on the same site and the burial ground was enlarged. It is a square Georgian building with a hipped roof and arched windows. The number of members attending Quaker meetings was 35 in 1826 and 39 in 1851. After the First World War attendance declined rapidly and in the 1920s the meeting house was closed and turned into a preparatory school.

The Thomas Gilkes who helped to provide the land for the meeting house had a son of the same name who became a clockmaker in Sibford Gower. He trained his son – a third Thomas Gilkes (1704–57) – in the same trade. This Gilkes established his own clockmaking business in Charlbury, and was reputed also to be an eminent Quaker minister. He was succeeded by his son, a fourth Thomas Gilkes (1740–75). A number of longcase clocks made by the two men still exist. William Harrison was a later Quaker clockmaker at Charlbury. A longcase clock that he made in about 1770 is known to survive. Another longcase clock by Harrison is in the Charlbury Society Museum. In 1792 Harrison installed the turret clock at University College, Oxford. Quakers had to be apprenticed to fellow Quakers, and those at Charlbury were part of a network of Quaker clockmakers in north Oxfordshire who were all linked by either family, former apprenticeship or both. As well as Sibford and Charlbury, Adderbury and Deddington were also centres of Quaker clockmaking.

== Transport ==
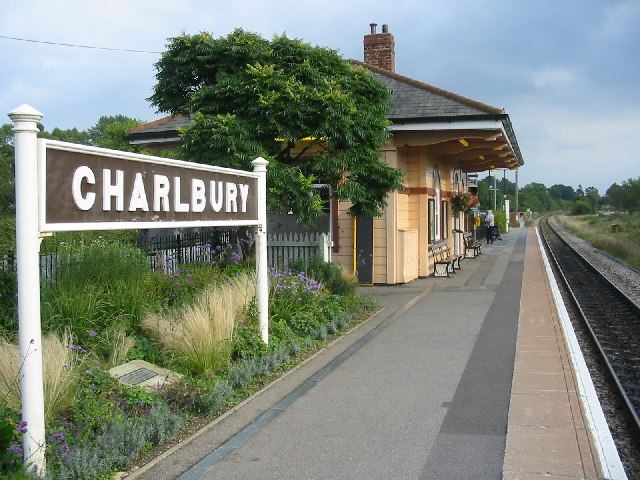
Charlbury railway station

Charlbury railway station is on the Cotswold Line. It is served by Great Western Railway trains between London Paddington, Oxford, Great Malvern, Worcester and Hereford. Bus services include a branch of Stagecoach in Oxfordshire route S3 between Charlbury and Oxford via Woodstock. Services on the Charlbury branch of route S3 run hourly, Monday – Saturday. Route S3 Sunday services do not serve Charlbury. Pulhams route X9 between Chipping Norton and Witney runs hourly via Charlbury, Monday – Saturday. There are other local bus services to and from Charlbury that run less than hourly.

== Media ==
Local news and television programmes are provided by BBC South and ITV Meridian. Television signals are received from the Oxford TV transmitter and the local relay transmitter. Local radio stations are BBC Radio Oxford on 95.2 FM, Heart South on 102.6 FM, Greatest Hits Radio South (formerly Jack FM) on 106.4 FM and Witney Radio, a community based station which broadcast to the town on 107.4 FM. The town is served by the local newspapers, Oxfordshire Guardian and the Charlbury Chronicle which is distributed free to every household in the town.

== Amenities ==
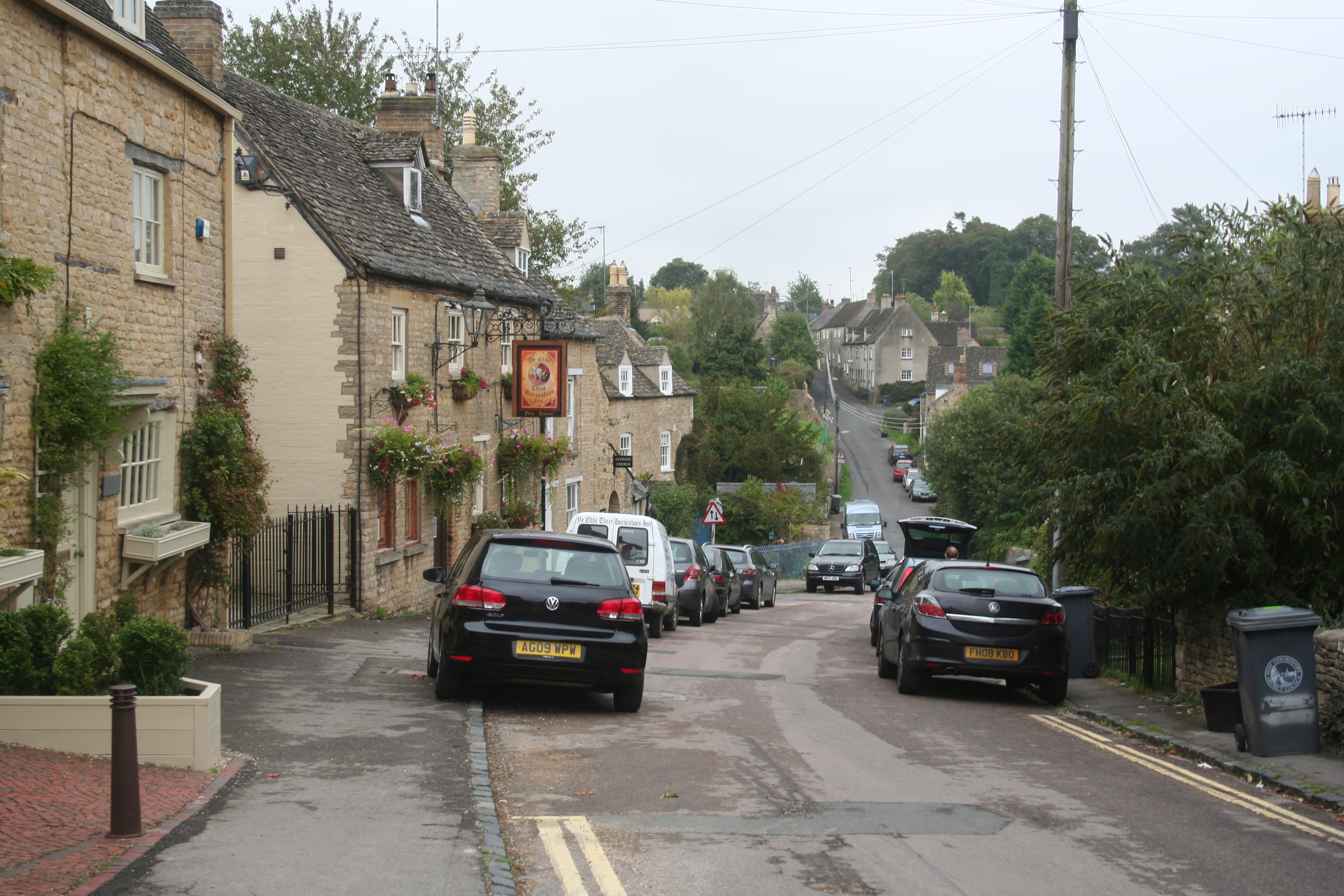
View down Sheep Street to Hixet Wood

Charlbury Town Football Club play in Witney and District Football League Premier Division. Charlbury Town Walking Football play in the Oxfordshire Walking Football League. Charlbury Cricket Club play in Oxfordshire Cricket Association League Division 1. Charlbury Bowls Club play in Oxfordshire Bowls League Division Two and the West Oxfordshire division of the Oxfordshire Short Mat Bowling Association. Charlbury has a Women's Institute. Charlbury Museum, opened in 1962, is a local museum run by the Charlbury Society. Charlbury hosts a number of public events each year: the Riverside Music Festival in July which is free to enter, the Wilderness Festival in August, the Charlbury Street Fair in September, which dates back to 1955, and the Charlbury Beer Festival in late June or July, which hosts the Aunt Sally Singles World Championship.

== Walcot ==
Walcot
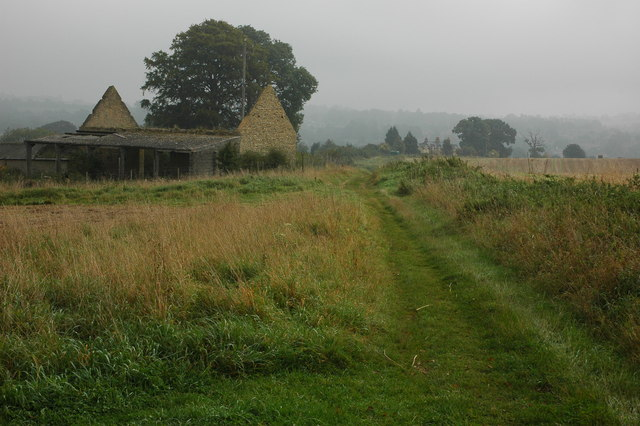
- Top Barn, Walcot

- Location within Oxfordshire
- OS grid reference: SP3466519833
- District: West Oxfordshire
- Unitary authority: Oxfordshire
- Shire county: Oxfordshire
- Ceremonial county: Oxfordshire
- Region: South East
- Country: England
- Sovereign state: United Kingdom
- Post town: Chipping Norton
- Postcode district: OX7
- Dialling code: 01608
- Police: Thames Valley
- Fire: Oxfordshire
- Ambulance: South Central

Walcot is a hamlet consisting of one farm in the civil parish of Charlbury. It is near the town of Charlbury, and in the Church of England parish of Charlbury with Shorthampton. The settlement comprises Walcot Farmhouse, a Grade II Listed manor house dating from the sixteenth-seventeenth centuries with latter additions. The Charlbury and Walcot (Oxon) estate survey of 1761, is held by the Bodleian Library Special Collections department. Walcot is close to Charlbury station, and is on a bridleway. It is near the River Evenlode, and is served by small turning off the B4437.

== See also ==
- Charlbury Road, Oxford

== Sources ==
- Beeson, C.F.C. (1989) [1962]. Simcock, A.V (ed.). Clockmaking in Oxfordshire 1400–1850 (3rd ed.). Oxford: Museum of the History of Science. ISBN 0-903364-06-9.
- Corbett, E (1962). A History of Spelsbury. Banbury: Cheney and Sons.
- Crossley, Alan, ed. (1972). "Parishes: Charlbury". A History of the County of Oxford. Victoria County History. Vol. 10: Banbury Hundred. London: Oxford University Press for the Institute of Historical Research. pp. 127–157. ISBN 978-0-19722-728-2.
- Mills, A.D.; Room, A. (2003). A Dictionary of British Place-Names. Oxford: Oxford University Press. ISBN 0-19-852758-6.
- Sherwood, Jennifer; Pevsner, Nikolaus (1974). Oxfordshire. The Buildings of England. Harmondsworth: Penguin Books. pp. 527–529. ISBN 0-14-071045-0.
