= Cotswold Olimpick Games =

Annual celebration of sports and games

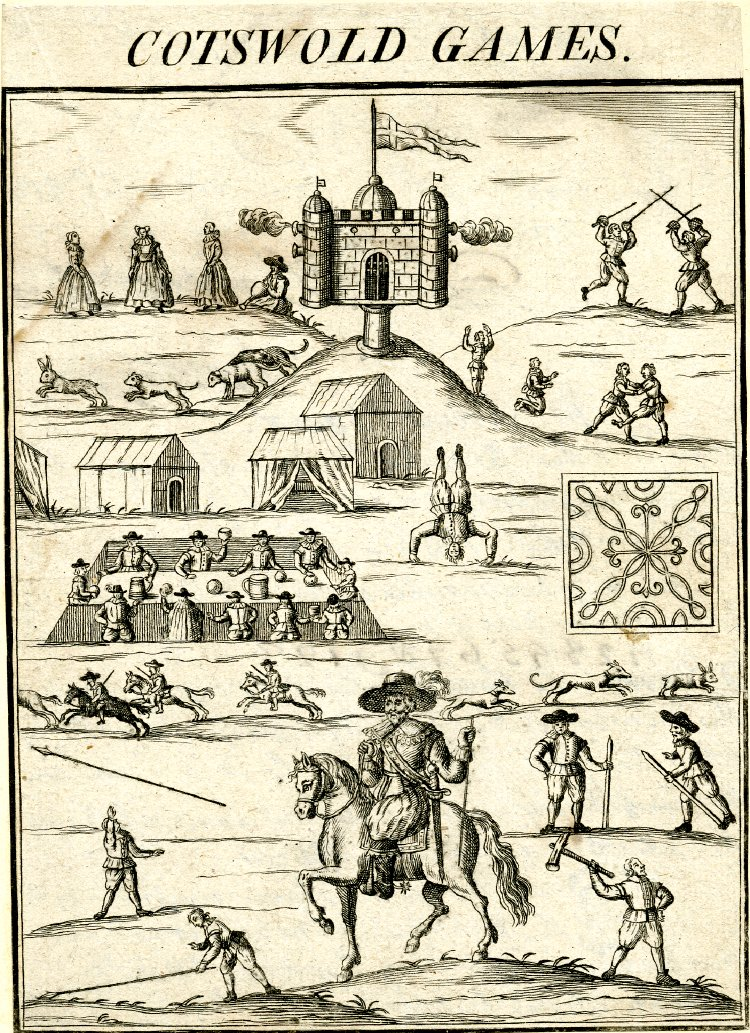
- Image from 1636 depicting the Cotswold Games. Robert Dover, founder of the games, is on horseback, carrying a wand.
- Abbreviation: Cotswold Olimpicks
- Chairman: Andy Norton
- Headquarters: Chipping Campden, England
- Website: Robert Dover's Games Society

The Cotswold Olimpick Games is an annual public celebration of games and sports now held on the Friday after Spring Bank Holiday near Chipping Campden, in the Cotswolds of England. The games likely began in 1612 and ran (through a period of discontinuations and revivals) until they were fully discontinued in 1852. However, they were revived in 1963 and still continue as of 2024.

The games originated with a local lawyer, Robert Dover, with the approval of King James I. Dover's motivation in organising the games may have been his belief that physical exercise was necessary for the defence of the realm, but he may also have been attempting to bring rich and poor together; the games were attended by all classes of society, including royalty on one occasion.

== Events ==
Events included horse-racing, coursing with hounds, running, jumping, dancing, sledgehammer throwing, fighting with swords and cudgels, quarterstaff, shin-kicking, and wrestling. Booths and tents were erected in which games such as chess and cards were played for small stakes, and abundant food was supplied for everyone who attended. A temporary wooden structure called Dover Castle was erected in a natural amphitheatre on what is now known as Dover's Hill, complete with small cannons that were fired to begin the events.

The games took place on the Thursday and Friday of the week of Whitsun, normally between mid-May and mid-June. Many 17th-century Puritans disapproved of such festivities, believing them to be of pagan origin, and they particularly disapproved of any celebration on a Sunday or a church holiday such as Whitsun. By the time of King James's death in 1625, many Puritan landowners had forbidden their workers to attend such festivities; the increasing tensions between the supporters of the king and the Puritans resulted in the outbreak of the English Civil War in 1642, bringing the games to an end.

Revived after the Restoration, the games gradually degenerated into a drunk and disorderly country festival according to their critics. The games ended again in 1852, when the common land on which they had been staged was partitioned between local landowners and farmers and subsequently enclosed. Since 1966, the games have been held each year on the Friday after Spring Bank Holiday. Events have included the tug of war, gymkhana, shin-kicking, dwile flonking, motorcycle scrambling, judo, piano smashing, and morris dancing. The British Olympic Association has recognised the Cotswold Olimpick Games as "the first stirrings of Britain's Olympic beginnings".

== Origins ==
The first event was likely held in 1612, organised by lawyer Robert Dover, although different sources give dates from 1601 until 1612. Little is known about Dover. He was probably born between 1575 and 1582 in Norfolk, one of four children born to John Dover, and may have been admitted to Queens' College at Cambridge in 1583, leaving early to avoid swearing the Oath of Supremacy. Dover was admitted to Gray's Inn on 27 February 1636, and was probably called to the bar in 1611, the same year he likely moved to Saintbury, near Chipping Campden, with his wife and children.

It is unclear whether Dover began the games from scratch, or took over from an existing event, perhaps a church ale. (Note: The word "ale" was used to describe any kind of festivity or feast.) The games had the approval of King James, who in his book of advice to his son, Basilikon Doron (1599), had written that to promote good feeling among the common people towards their king, "certain days in the year would be appointed, for delighting the people with public spectacles of all honest games, and exercise of arms". Although there was at that time in England a growing admiration for the ancient Greeks, Dover may have been motivated by military rather than cultural considerations. His biographer, Christopher Whitfield, claimed that Dover combined ancient countryside practices with "classical mythology and Renaissance culture, whilst linking them with the throne and the King's Protestant Church". Dover believed that physical exercise was necessary for the defence of the kingdom. He may also have believed that the games would bring rich and poor together, increasing social harmony, an ideal that might explain why the event captured the public imagination; the poetry of the period eulogises the games as "an occasion of social harmony and communal joy". (Note: Writing a few years after the first games, of 1612, Dover himself claimed to be uncertain of his motivations in starting the games: I cannot tell what planet ruled, when I First undertook this mirth, this jollity, Nor can I give account to you at all, How this conceit into my brain did fall. Or how I durst assemble, call together Such multitudes of people as come hither.)

Endymion Porter, a member of the court of King James, had an estate in the village of Aston-sub-Edge, close to Dover's home. Dover acted as Porter's legal agent between 1622 and 1640, and through him James sent some of his own clothes to Dover, "purposely to grace him and consequently the solemnity [of the g]". James may also have granted Dover a coat of arms, with the motto "Do Ever Good", as claimed by Dover's grandson, a claim that was rejected by the heraldic authorities in 1682.

The Annalia Dubrensia (Annals of Dover), a collection of poems praising Dover and his achievements in promoting and managing the games, was published in 1636. The contributors included well-known poets such as Michael Drayton, Ben Jonson, Thomas Randolph, and Thomas Heywood. They saw the games as revitalising traditional English social life, and they countered opposition from the critics of such events, who complained of "drunken behaviour and sexual licence", by stressing the "peaceful and well-behaved" nature of the occasion, and even praising the games as "a gesture of loyalty to the king". The games had acquired their title of "Olimpicks" by the time the Annalia Dubrensia was published, a name approved of by Dover. It secularised the proceedings, while adding an air of gentrification to the sports by linking them with the Olympics of ancient Greece. Having been brought up in a Catholic family, Dover might well have been keen not to draw attention to religion, particularly if the games had taken over from an earlier church ale.

== Proceedings ==
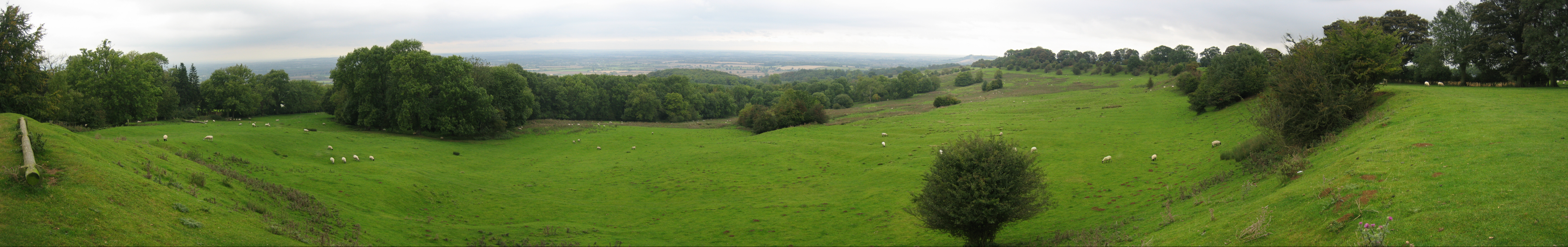
A panoramic view of the site of the games

The games took place in a natural amphitheatre on what is known today as Dover's Hill, then called Kingcombe Plain, above the town of Chipping Campden, in Gloucestershire. They were held on the Thursday and Friday of Whit-Week, or the week of Whitsun, which normally fell between mid-May and mid-June. Dover presided over the games on horseback, dressed ceremonially in a coat, hat, feather and ruff, donated by King James. Horses and men were decorated with Dover's favours, yellow ribbons pinned to a hat or worn around the arm, leg, or neck. Tents were erected for the gentry, who came from the surrounding counties of Gloucestershire, Oxfordshire and Worcestershire, and food was supplied in abundance. The poet Nicholas Wallington wrote that:

He [Dover] spares no cost; this also doth afford
To those that sit at any board.
None ever hungry from these Games come home,
Or e'er made plaint of viands, or of room.

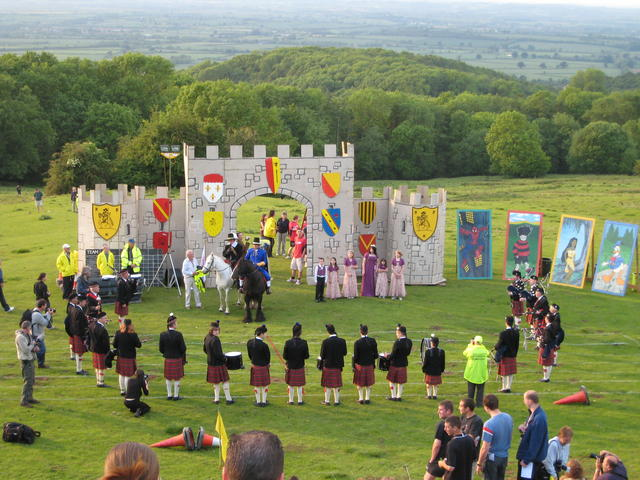
The Cotswold Olympicks, 2007 opening, Dover's Hill

A temporary wooden building was constructed each year, called Dover Castle, from which gunfire salutes were sounded during the competitions. Competitors were summoned to the hillside by the sound of a hunting horn, to take part in various sports. Mounted cannons were fired to begin the events, which included horse-racing, coursing with hounds, running, jumping, dancing, sledgehammer throwing, fighting with swords and cudgels, quarterstaff, and wrestling. Prizes included silver trophies for the mounted sports, and perhaps also money for the other events.

The contests were refereed by officials called sticklers, from which the phrase "a stickler for the rules" is derived. Sticklers were so-named because they carried sticks, with which to safely separate two fighting swordsmen. No scores or times are recorded for any of the events. Portable watches of the time were "rare, costly, and relatively unreliable devices", but perhaps just as importantly "nobody in Dover's time was much interested in sports record-keeping or record-breaking".

Visitors from all strata of society attended, from agricultural labourers to the nobility, some of whom travelled up to 60 miles (97 km) to attend the games. Prince Rupert attended in 1636.

=== Other diversions ===
A harper dressed as the Greek poet Homer entertained the crowds, enhancing the classical Olympic theme. There was also a maze, known as a Troy Town, constructed from piled up turf with walls about 1 foot (0.30 m) high, through which villagers would dance. Various games were played for small stakes in booths and tents, including chess, Irish – a game similar to backgammon – and card games such as cent, a game like piquet. King James approved of card games "when you have no other thing ado ... and are weary of reading ... and when it is foul and stormy weather", but he considered chess to be "too obsessive a game".

The games ended with a grand firework display, centred on the castle.

== Controversy ==
In the 17th century many Puritans believed that the slightest action might lead to sin, and even to Hell if it was not repented. They frowned on festivities such as the games as being of pagan origin, promoting immorality and drunkenness, and disapproved of any celebration on a church holiday such as Whitsun. A Puritan revolt over a 1627 "Bringing in the May" festival at Mount Wollaston in present-day Massachusetts resulted in the expulsion of its organiser from the colony. King James, on the other hand, viewed Puritanism as a challenge to the authority of the monarch.

The fine clothes donated by the King, which Dover wore when he presided over the games, were not just a fashion statement, but also a political one. The feather in Dover's hat was a "flag of defiance to virtue" in Puritan eyes, and even the starch probably used in the washing of his ruff was evil, according to the Puritan writer Philip Stubbes. He described starch as "[a] certain kind of liquid matter ... wherein the Devil hath learned them [non-Puritans] to wash and die their ruffs".

James was succeeded by King Charles I in 1625. The new king reluctantly consented to an Act of Parliament "for punishing divers abuses on the Lord's Day, called Sunday". The Act restricted the activities that were allowed to take place on a Sunday, and prohibited any meetings of people outside their own parishes on Sunday. Many Puritan landowners went even further, forbidding their workers to attend any church ales, culminating in two Somerset circuit judges ruling in 1632 that "all public ales be henceforth utterly suppressed".

The following year Charles reversed the judges' ruling of 1632. He produced a new version of James's Book of Sports, which he ordered to be read in every church. In it he wrote:

We find that under pretence of taking away abuses, there hath been a general forbidding, not only of ordinary meetings, but of the feast of the dedication of the churches, commonly called wakes ... Now our express will and pleasure is that these feasts, with others, shall be observed, and that our Justices of the Peace ... shall look to it, both that all disorders there may be prevented or punished, and that all neighbourhood and freedom, with man-like and lawful exercises be used.

The outbreak of the English Civil War in 1642 brought the games to an end.

== First revival, 1660–1850 ==
On Thursday in Whit-week, On that Highly-renowned and universally admired spot called Dover's Hill, Near Chipping Campden. Glos. The sports will commence with a grand match of Backswords for a purse of guineas, To be played by 9 or 7 men on a side. Each side must appear in the ring by 3 o'clock in the afternoon. Or 15s. each pair will be given for as many as will play. Wrestling for belts and others prizes. Also Jumping in bags and dancing. And a Jingling Match for 10s. 6d. As well as divers others of celebrated Cotswold and Olympic games, for which this annual meeting, has been famed for centuries.

— Flyer advertising the games of 1812

The games were revived at some uncertain date after the Restoration of 1660. Dover had died in 1652, and bereft of his influence, the games became "just another drunken country festival", according to an account written by the poet William Somervile in 1740. By then the games, known as Dover's Meeting, were well established and once again quite popular, and included events such as backsword fighting. It is unclear whether the contestants fought with metal or wooden swords, but there is no doubt that very real danger was involved. During a fight at the beginning of the 19th century, one of the contestants was so badly injured that he died soon afterwards. The wrestling competitions had become shin-kicking contests, with competitors wearing heavily nailed boots, sometimes with pointed tips. The poet and writer Richard Graves described the games in his picaresque novel The Spiritual Quixote (1773) as a "heathenish assembly". Somervile's account of the 1740 games describes a general riot in which "chairs, and forms, and battered bowls are hurled/With fell intent; like bombs the bottles fly". Graves dramatised the enthusiasm for the women's race for a Holland shift displayed on a pole: "six young women began to exhibit themselves before the whole assembly, in a dress hardly reconcilable to the rules of decency". By 1845 the games were being organised by a local publican, William Drury, who paid £5 for the right to do so. He hired out space for stalls and booths, and presumably sold alcohol at the event. The rector of Weston-sub-Edge, the parish in which Dover's Hill is located, Reverend Geoffrey Drinkwater Bourne, claimed that up to 30,000 people were attending the games by then, and that the hillside was full of drunk and disorderly individuals. Bourne also claimed that:

From 1846 onwards, the games, instead of being as they originally were intended to be decorously conducted, became the trysting place of all the lowest scum of the population which lived in the districts lying between Birmingham and Oxford.

Such accounts may have been exaggerated however, as there are few reports of police being called to the games, and no court records of prosecutions for drunkenness or fighting.

The staging of the games depended on the existence of a suitably large area of common land, but by the mid-19th century much of England's common land was being partitioned up and fenced off. Consent for the enclosure of the parish of Weston-sub-Edge was given in 1850, signalling the end of the games in 1852. The parish's 969 acres (392 ha) were divided among local farmers and landowners; Reverend Bourne, who a few years earlier had complained so vociferously about the games, received 63 acres (25 ha).

== Shakespearean connection ==
Some historians have suggested that the games were alluded to in playwright William Shakespeare's The Merry Wives of Windsor, and used that as evidence to suggest that Shakespeare may have seen the games but the allusion is not present in the quarto edition of 1602, making its first appearance in the posthumous First Folio of 1623, edited by Henry Condell and John Hemminges. It is therefore uncertain whether or not it was written by Shakespeare.

The first Shakespearean scholars to make a connection between Dover and Shakespeare were Samuel Johnson, George Steevens, Thomas Warton, and Edmond Malone; historian Jean Wilson has commented that it required "quite imaginative leaps such as a hill referred to by Bolingbroke [King Henry IV of England] being the hill on which the games were held". More recently, the historian and secretary of the Robert Dover's Games Society, Francis Burns, has suggested that the wrestling scene in As You Like It "reflects the wrestling at the Games".

Although Shakespeare may have been acquainted with Robert Dover, there is no evidence that he ever attended the games.

== Second revival, 1951–present-day ==
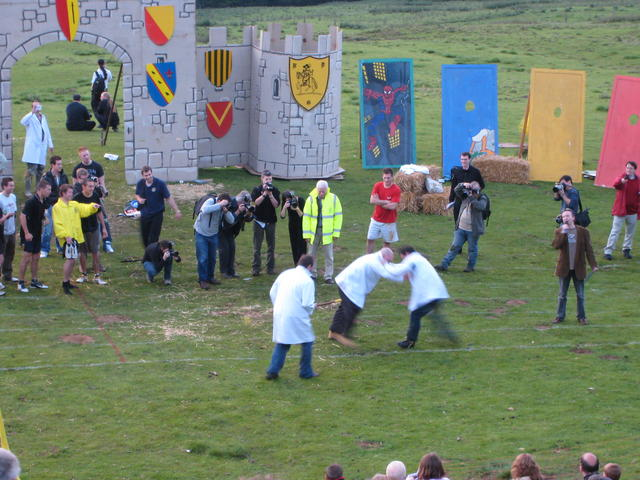
A shin-kicking contest

Dover's Hill was bought by the National Trust in 1928, and until recently contained a monument to Robert Dover. The games were revived for the 1951 Festival of Britain, but did not return to being a regular event until the Robert Dover's Games Society was founded in 1965. Except when exceptionally bad weather or an outbreak of foot-and-mouth disease has forced their cancellation the games have been held each year since 1966, on the evening of the Friday after Spring Bank Holiday, and attract thousands of visitors. An actor dressed as Dover arrives on horseback to open the games. Events have included the tug of war, gymkhana, shin-kicking, dwile flonking, motorcycle scrambling, judo, piano smashing, morris dancing, and, in 1976, poetry. After dusk a bonfire is lit, followed by a torchlight procession to the square in Chipping Campden, where the entertainment continues well into the night.

The British Olympic Association, in its successful bid for the 2012 Olympic Games in London, recognised Dover's games as "the first stirrings of Britain's Olympic beginnings". Writing in 1972, the athletics coach and sports journalist Ron Pickering said: (Note: William Penny Brookes was the founder of the Wenlock Olympian Society, which held its first annual Games in 1859.)

The influence of English rural sports, and the work of William Penny Brookes and Robert Dover, have been significant in the development of the Olympic Games philosophy. Almost half the events in the Modern Games are historically connected to British rural sports. Therefore we have a certain arrogant claim and a responsibility to the development of the Modern Olympic Games.

While the 2017 games did not take place due to fundraising and personnel issues, the games resumed in 2018. The 2019 games agenda included events such as a children's half mile Junior Circuit, a championship-of-the-hill race for adults and a tug of war competition. The organizers also planned fireworks, a torchlit procession, marching bands and cannons firing. The 2020 and 2021 games were cancelled due to the COVID-19 pandemic.

== See also ==
- Robert Dover (Cotswold Games) – English attorney, author and wit
