= World Black Pudding Throwing Championships =

Annual event in Ramsbottom, England

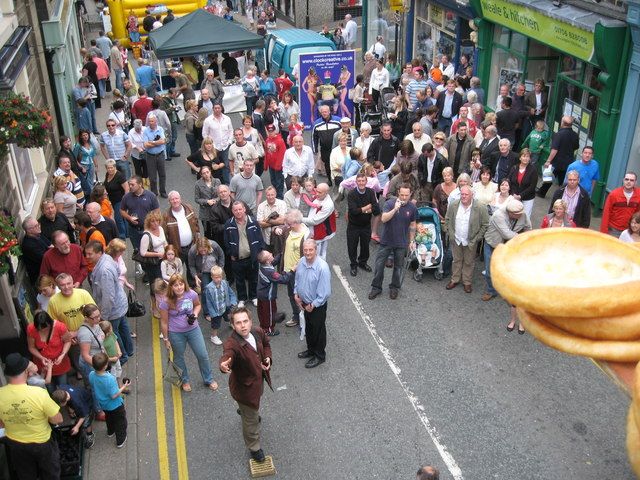
A competitor hurls a black pudding towards the Yorkshire puddings

The World Black Pudding Throwing Championships are held annually in Ramsbottom, Greater Manchester, England, outside The Oaks (formerly the Royal Oak) pub on Bridge Street on the second Sunday of September.

In the event, a stack of Yorkshire puddings are placed on a 20-foot (6.1 m) plinth, and competitors must knock down as many as they can by hurling three black puddings at them.

Although the popular title for this competition uses the word throwing, the local organizers are attempting to correct this title by using the correct term, hurling, thus calling it the World Black Pudding Hurling Championships, since according to the rules of the competition the black puddings are hurled underhand rather than thrown overhand.

== History ==
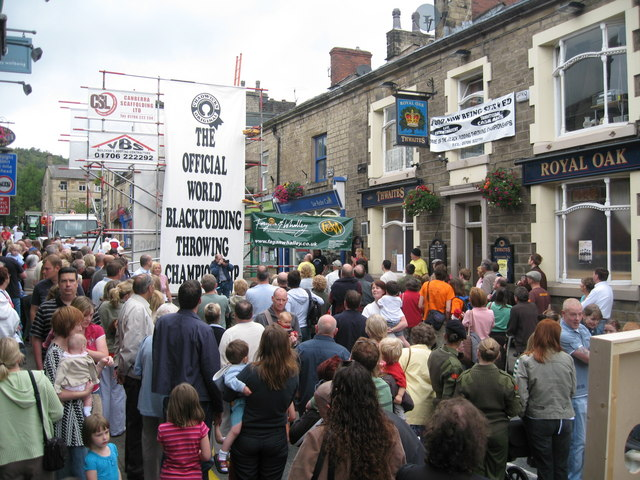
Crowd gathered outside the Royal Oak, Ramsbottom, for the 2007 championship

The event was originally held outside the Corner Pin pub reincarnated by James Cunliffe in nearby Stubbins before that pub was closed and converted to offices. Money raised by the event is donated to local good causes.

Local legends claim the tradition dates back to the War of the Roses. Warring factions of the House of Lancaster and the House of York at a battle in Stubbins, Lancashire, in 1455 are said to have run out of ammunition and resorted to throwing food at each other; black pudding from Lancashire and Yorkshire puddings from Yorkshire. This competition is said to have been revived by a pub landlord in 1839 and again in 1984 by the Stubbins Community Trust. It has been a popular custom in the town ever since, drawing thousands of spectators to watch every year.

== List of winners ==
| Year | Winner1993 |
|---|---|
| 1990 | Ste Thornley (ENG) |
| 1996 | Dave Howarth (ENG) |
| 2000 | David McCabe (ENG) |
| 2001 | Jim Riley (AUS) |
| 2002 | Steven Pilkington (ENG) |
| 2003 | Nick Connor (ENG) |
| 2004 | John Burns (ENG) |
| 2005 | Mark Greaves (ENG) |
| 2006 | Dave Jones (WAL) |
| 2007 | Paul Rudge (ENG) |
| 2008 | Adam Arthern (ENG) |
| 2009 | Huseyin Ozluk (TUR) |
| 2010 | Terry Ryan (ENG) |
| 2011 | Warwick Turner (AUS) |
| 2012 | Alan Cunliffe (ENG) |
| 2013 | Huseyin Ozluk (TUR) |
| 2014 | John Barrett (ENG) |
| 2015 | Mark Cannon (ENG) |
| 2016 | Gavin Ogden (ENG) |
| 2017 | Nick Pennell (ENG) |
| 2018 | Andrew Ferrier (ENG) |
| 2019 | Tom Lowden (ENG) |
| 2020 | No event |
| 2021 | Andrew Ferrier (ENG) |
| 2022 | Stuart Hubbart (ENG) |
| 2023 | Stu Pearson (ENG) |
| 2024 | Harry Ogden (ENG) |
| 2025 | Ged Flanagan (ENG) |
