= Cock throwing =

Blood sport widely practised in England until the late 18th century

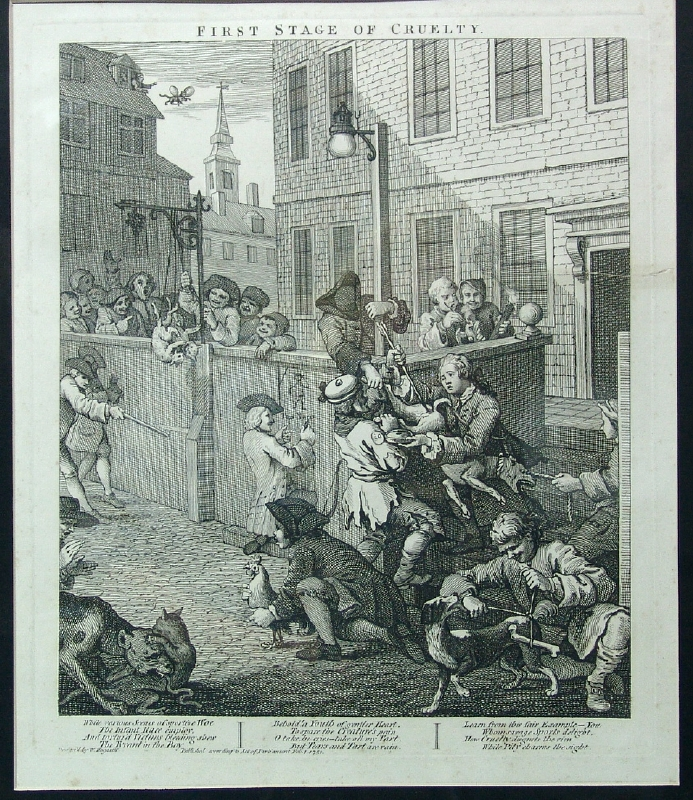
William Hogarth's First Stage of Cruelty shows schoolboys cock throwing, though it was dangerous practice to hold the rooster while others threw at it.

Cock throwing, also known as cock-shying or throwing at cocks, was a blood sport widely practised in England until the late 18th century. A rooster was tied to a post, and people took turns throwing weighted sticks called "coksteles" at the bird until it died. Cock throwing was traditionally associated with Shrove Tuesday. In 1737, a contributor to The Gentleman's Magazine argued that cock throwing arose from anti-French sentiment in England, as the cock played an emblematic role in the culture of France.

Cock throwing was a popular pastime with people of all classes, especially with children, and although widespread, was less common than cockfighting. Sir Thomas More referred to his skill in casting a cokstele as a boy. If the bird had its legs broken or was lamed during the event, it was sometimes supported with sticks in order to prolong the game. The cock was also sometimes placed inside an earthenware jar to prevent it from moving. Variations on the theme included goose quailing (or squailing), when a goose was substituted, and cock thrashing or cock whipping, which involved a cock being placed in a pit where the blindfolded participants would attempt to hit it with their sticks. A Sussex variation was similar to bull-baiting with the rooster tied to a 4-or-5-foot-long (1.2 or 1.5 m) cord.

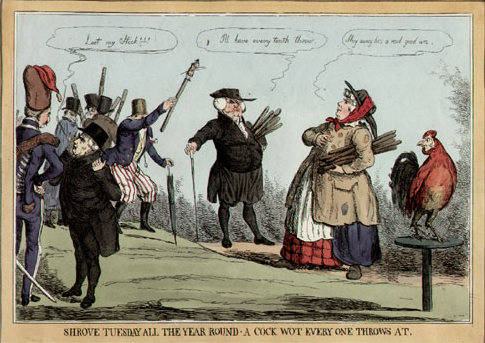
Wellington appears as the cock in this cartoon depicting cock throwing from around the 1820s.

In 1660, an official pronouncement by Puritan officials in Bristol to forbid cock throwing (as well as cat and dog tossing) on Shrove Tuesday resulted in a riot by the apprentices.

Cock throwing's popularity slowly waned in England, as social values changed and animal welfare became a concern. William Hogarth depicted it as a barbarous activity, the first stage in a "slippery slope", in The Four Stages of Cruelty in 1751, and Nathan Drake credited this in part for changes in public attitudes to the sport. The Anglican divine and political economist Josiah Tucker also dismissed the sport as a "most cruel and barbarous diversion' in his 'Earnest and Affectionate Address to the Common People of England Concerning their Usual Recreations on Shrove Tuesday' (1753), drawing attention to the suffering and 'lingering tortures' of a 'poor innocent creature'. From the middle of the 18th century, magistrates began to deal with the problem more harshly, a marker of its loss in popularity among the "respectable" classes, imposing fines for public order offences, and local by-laws banned the practice in many places.

By the early 19th century, the tradition was all but forgotten, lingering as isolated incidents into the 1840s.

== See also ==
- Bull-baiting
- Fox tossing
- Goose pulling
