= Bathurst (surname) =

Bathurst (/ˈbæθ(h)ɜːrst, ˈbɑːθ-, -(h)ərst/) is a surname of Old English origin. It is a locational surname, referring to those from Bathurst manor, near Battle Abbey, Sussex.

Notable people with this name include:

- Allen Bathurst, 1st Earl Bathurst (1684–1775), politician
- Allen Bathurst, 6th Earl Bathurst (1832–1892)
- Allen Bathurst, 9th Earl Bathurst (born 1961)
- Allen Bathurst, Lord Apsley (1895–1942), British Army officer
- Benjamin Bathurst (disambiguation), many people
- Charles Bathurst, 1st Viscount Bledisloe, (1867–1958) agriculturist and politician
- Charles Bathurst (MP, born 1754) (1754–1831), better known as Charles Bragge Bathurst, a British politician
- Christopher Bathurst, 3rd Viscount Bledisloe (1934–2009)
- Earl Bathurst
- Elizabeth Bathurst (1655–1685), English Quaker preacher and theologian
- Henry Bathurst, 2nd Earl Bathurst (1714–1794), lord chancellor
- Henry Bathurst, 3rd Earl Bathurst (1762–1834), secretary for war & colonies
- Henry Bathurst, 4th Earl Bathurst (1790–1866), MP
- Henry Bathurst, 8th Earl Bathurst (1927–2011)
- Henry Bathurst (bishop) (1744–1837)
- John Bathurst (1607–1659), physician
- Otto Benjamin Charles Bathurst (born 1971), British television and film director
- Peter Bathurst (1687–1748), member of parliament for Wilton, for Cirencester, and for Salisbury
- Peter Bathurst (1723–1801), member of parliament for Eye
- Ralph Bathurst (1620–1704)
- Richard Bathurst (1722/3–1762), physician and writer
- Robert Bathurst (born 1957), actor
- Robin Gilbert Charles Bathurst (1920–2006), English geologist
- Seymour Bathurst, 7th Earl Bathurst (1864–1923)
- Walter Bathurst (1764–1827), naval officer
- William Bathurst, 5th Earl Bathurst (1791–1878)
- William Hiley Bathurst (1796–1877), clergyman
