= List of deputy lieutenants of Gloucestershire =

This is an incomplete list of deputy lieutenants of Gloucestershire.

- Benjamin St John Ackers
- John Aldam Aizlewood
- Charles Allen (Stroud MP)
- Sir Charles Allfrey
- Sir Michael Angus
- Allen Bathurst, Lord Apsley
- Sir Clement Armitage
- Thomas Ashton, 2nd Baron Ashton of Hyde
- Benjamin Bathurst (politician, born 1872)
- Henry Bathurst, 8th Earl Bathurst
- Seymour Bathurst, 7th Earl Bathurst
- Sir Thomas Bazley, 1st Baronet
- Henry Somerset, 8th Duke of Beaufort
- Henry Somerset, 9th Duke of Beaufort
- Sally Byng
- Sir Egbert Cadbury
- Alfred Carpenter
- Sir Charles Cave, 1st Baronet
- Sir Stephen Cave
- Sir William Davis
- Sir James Buller East, 2nd Baronet
- Sir Henry Elwes
- Lewis Fry
- Henry Goodeve
- Arthur Goschen
- Michael Hicks Beach, 1st Earl St Aldwyn
- Edward Holland (MP)
- Sir James Horlick, 1st Baronet
- Sir Francis Howard
- Sir Stafford Howard
- Manley James (VC)
- Sir Anthony Kershaw
- Sir John Kiszely
- Percival Marling
- Tony Mason (RAF officer)
- Thomas Master (died 1710)
- Charles James Monk
- Henry Reynolds-Moreton, Lord Moreton
- Ashley Ponsonby
- Bertram Freeman-Mitford, 1st Baron Redesdale
- Richard Bevan (Royal Navy officer)
- Francis Richards (diplomat)
- Gordon Richardson, Baron Richardson of Duntisbourne
- Brian Robertson, 1st Baron Robertson of Oakridge
- Michael Hicks Beach, 2nd Earl St Aldwyn
- John Scudamore, 2nd Viscount Scudamore
- Phil Vickery (rugby union) (2015)
- David Walker (RAF administrative officer)
- Evelyn Webb-Carter
- William Wedderburn
- James Charteris, 13th Earl of Wemyss
- Steven West
- David Fane, 15th Earl of Westmorland
- Neville Wigram, 2nd Baron Wigram
- Herbert Charles Woodcock
