= Royal North Gloucestershire Militia =

Auxiliary unit of the British Army

North Gloucestershire Fusiliers Royal North Gloucestershire Militia 4th Battalion, Gloucestershire Regiment
- Active: 9 April 1761–31 July 1908
- Country: Kingdom of Great Britain (1761–1800); United Kingdom (1801–1908)
- Branch: Militia
- Role: Infantry
- Garrison/HQ: Cecily Hill Barracks, Cirencester
- Anniversaries: 'Back Number Day' (21 March)

Commanders
- Notable commanders: Col Samuel Blackwell; Lt-Col Winchcombe Henry Hartley; Col Robert Kingscote; Col Sir Robert Nigel Fitzhardinge Kingscote; Lt-Col Allen Bathurst; Lt-Col Seymour Bathurst, 7th Earl Bathurst

The Royal North Gloucestershire Militia (RNGM), later the 4th (Militia) Battalion, Gloucestershire Regiment was a Militia regiment raised in the county of Gloucestershire in the West of England. From its formal creation in 1763 the regiment served in home defence and overseas garrisons in all of Britain's major wars until 1908.

== Background ==
The universal obligation to military service in the Shire levy was long established in England and its legal basis was updated by two acts of 1557 (4 & 5 Ph. & M. cc. 2 and 3), which placed selected men, the 'trained bands', under the command of Lords Lieutenant appointed by the monarch. This is seen as the starting date for the organised county militia in England. The Gloucestershire Trained Bands were called out in the Armada year of 1588, and again a century later during the Monmouth Rebellion and the Glorious Revolution (when they were among the few units to see action in a largely bloodless campaign). The Gloucestershire Militia continued to be mustered for training during the reign of William III; by now they were divided into four foot regiments (White, Green, Blue and Red) as well as a regiment of horse and a separate Bristol regiment. But after the Treaty of Utrecht in 1713 the militia was allowed to dwindle.

== North Gloucestershire Fusiliers ==
=== Seven Years War ===
Under threat of French invasion during the Seven Years' War a series of Militia Acts from 1757 re-established county militia regiments, the men being conscripted by means of parish ballots (paid substitutes were permitted) to serve for three years. Gloucestershire, with the cities of Gloucester and Bristol, was given a quota of 960 men to raise. It was one of the first counties to meet the bulk of its quota (encompassing the vestiges of the old regiments) and was ready to issue them with arms on 15 May 1759. A train of waggons carrying arms and accoutrements for the regiment left the Tower of London on 22 May. The first or South battalion of the regiment was embodied for permanent duty at Gloucester on 27 July with eight companies under the command of Colonel Norborne Berkeley, who became Lord Lieutenant of Gloucestershire in 1762.

At that time the second or North Battalion had only gathered two companies but it was formally raised with seven companies at Cirencester on 22 August 1760, despite riots in the town against the ballot. It was embodied on 9 April 1761 under the command of Lieutenant-Colonel Thomas, 6th Viscount Tracy and designated as Fusiliers. Both battalions were camped together at Winchester during the summer of 1761. Here the regiment was badly hit by sickness: from a strength of 424 men in June, the North battalion only 195 on parade on 5 October, and by the end of the season the regiment was down to about 100 fit men. Colonel Berkeley had huts built by the regimental pioneers to house the sick men. In November the North battalion was back to a strength of about 352. By then the battalion was stationed at Bideford guarding French prisoners-of-war. It returned to Winchester in June 1762, then in the autumn it marched to Gloucestershire.

The Seven Years' War ended with the Treaty of Paris on 10 February 1763 and the two battalions of Gloucestershire militia were disembodied, but not before they became separate South and North regiments on 20 April. Samuel Blackwell, who had been the major when the battalion was embodied, was commissioned as colonel of the North Gloucestershire Fusiliers, and Cirencester became its headquarters.

=== War of American Independence ===
After the outbreak of the War of American Independence in 1775 a controversial Act of Parliament was passed to 'Enable His Majesty to call out and assemble the Militia in all cases of Rebellion in any part of the Dominion belonging to the Crown of Great Britain' (raising the possibility that they may have to serve in North America). In the event the militia was called out in its traditional role when Britain was threatened with invasion by the Americans' allies, France and Spain. The North Regiment was embodied in March 1778 under Col Blackwell (by now MP for Cirencester), who was granted the same rank in the army on 2 July 1779.

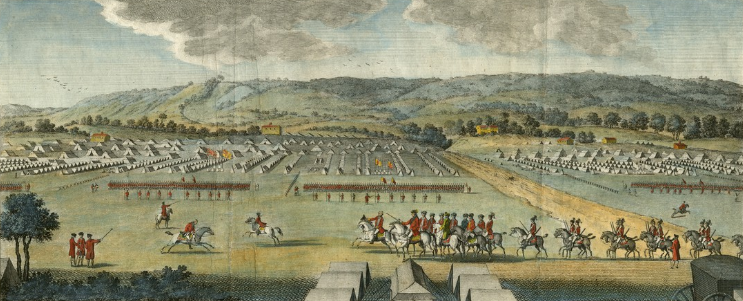
A review at Coxheath Camp.

After three months at Cirencester the regiment marched to Essex where it was encamped at Warley Heath in during the summer of 1778. It returned to Cirencester for the winter, and in the summer of 1779 it was at Coxheath Camp near Maidstone in Kent. Coxheath was the army's largest training camp, where the Militia were exercised as part of a division alongside Regular troops while providing a reserve in case of French invasion of South East England. The North Gloucesters formed part of the Left Wing under Major-General Hall. At Warley and Coxheath each battalion had two small field-pieces or 'battalion guns' attached to it, manned by men of the regiment instructed by a Royal Artillery sergeant and two gunners.

From Coxheath the regiment marched in November 1779 to Gravesend and then to the villages round Foots Cray before wintering at Cirencester. It spent the summer of 1780 in Somerset and Devonshire, wintering at Wells, where its duties included assisting the Revenue officers. In the summer of 1781 the regiment, 420 strong, formed part of the 3rd Brigade of the Plymouth garrison, first at Dock Town, then at Roborough Camp, and from October in the town's barracks. It remained at Plymouth for a year. In 1782 it had 547 men in eight companies. On 8 November it began the march from Plymouth back to Gloucestershire where it was disembodied at the end of the year.

From 1784 to 1792 the militia were assembled for their 28 days' annual training, but to save money only two-thirds of the men were actually called out. Col Blackwell died in 1785 and was succeeded in command by Lt-Col Winchcombe Henry Hartley, MP (who later married Blackwell's daughter).

=== French Revolutionary War ===
In view of the worsening international situation the militia was embodied for service in 1792, even though Revolutionary France did not declare war on Britain until 1 February 1793. Winchcombe Hartley was promoted to colonel on the embodiment, but died in 1794 and Maj Robert Kingscote of Kingscote Park (whose father had been also major of the regiment) was rapidly promoted to colonel of the North Gloucestershire Militia on 31 March 1794, and given that rank in the army for the duration of the embodiment. After assembling at Cirencester the regiment marched to Devon, where it spent the summer at Dartmouth and then at Roborough Camp at Plymouth. It wintered at Barnstaple, then spent the summer of 1794 at Totnes and the autumn at Berry Head Camp. After wintering at Totnes the North Gloucesters marched in June 1795 to South Down Camp near Weymouth, Dorset. Both Gloucestershire regiments were stationed here while King George III stayed at Weymouth. In August he granted them both the title 'Royal', but the Royal North Gloucester (RNGM) lost its 'Fusiliers' distinction the following year.

During the French Wars the militia were employed anywhere in the country for coast defence, manning garrisons, guarding prisoners of war, for internal security – and helping to bring in the harvest – while the Regular Army regarded them as a source of trained men if they could be persuaded to transfer. Their traditional local defence duties were taken over by the part-time Volunteers. Service in the militia could be hard: the men found that a daily food allowance of five pence did not go far when the price of provisions rose, and some units were involved in food riots. While stationed at Portsmouth the men of the Gloucestershire Militia forced the local butchers to lower their prices.

As the invasion threat grew in 1796 the Militia was doubled in size: Gloucestershire had to find an additional 1757 militiamen for the Supplementary Militia, though unlike some counties these were incorporated into the two existing regiments, the RNGM receiving a draft of 355 in 1798 to bring it up to a strength of about 850 in 10 companies. The Supplementary Militia were stood down in 1799, but the county had to find 1163 more in 1802.

The RNGM was stationed at Poole until July 1796, then at Lydd and Ashford in Kent. In early 1797 it was at Ashford Barracks and then moved back to Weymouth for the summer. It remained with four companies there and four at Poole until June 1799 when it was moved to Winchester Barracks, and subsequently to Portsmouth.

==== Ireland ====
After the Irish Rebellion of 1798 broke out the eight companies of the Royal North Gloucesters at Portsea Barracks volunteered for service there on 2 September. They were immediately ordered to make all haste from to Liverpool to embark for Dublin, the port of embarkation later being changed to Bristol. (About 320 men were left as depot companies at Portchester Castle and Fareham Barracks.) The main body was joined by the Grenadier and Light companies from Weymouth and embarked 614-strong at Pill, near Bristol, landing at Dublin under Col Kingscote (gazetted as a colonel in the army for the duration of the service) on 11 September before marching to Drogheda. But they had arrived too late for action, the French army supporting the rebels having surrendered at Ballinamuck on 8 September. The regiment returned to England in April 1799 and camped in Sussex. The following year it was in garrison at Dover Castle and Shorncliffe Camp. The RNGM provided large drafts of recruits to the 9th, 53rd and 56th Foot, and the invasion crisis having passed the militia were reduced, the RNGM from 10 to eight companies. These companies had an establishment of just 466 men, of whom 40 were trained to man the two field guns with which regiments in Southern District were equipped. There was another invasion scare in 1801 – the RNGM's alarm post was in front of the barracks at Dover Castle – but this passed in October, and a peace treaty having been agreed (the Treaty of Amiens), the militia were disembodied in 1802. The peacetime quota for Gloucestershire was set at 1163 militiamen. begun.

=== Napoleonic War ===
But the Peace of Amiens quickly broke down, and the Militia were embodied once more in 1803. The Royal North Gloucesters assembled with seven companies at Cirencester on 28 March and marched to Portsmouth, where part of it occupied Fort Cumberland. In June it was increased to an establishment of 10 companies totalling 930 men. In March 1804 the regiment left Portsmouth and marched to Silverhill Barracks in Sussex, and that summer its strength rose to nearly 1400 men. In the autumn it was sent to camp at Pett Castle and employed in digging anti-invasion trenches (the forerunners of the Royal Military Canal). On 31 October it marched to winter quarters at Steyning Castle, with lookout points on Chanctonbury and Wolstonbury Hills.

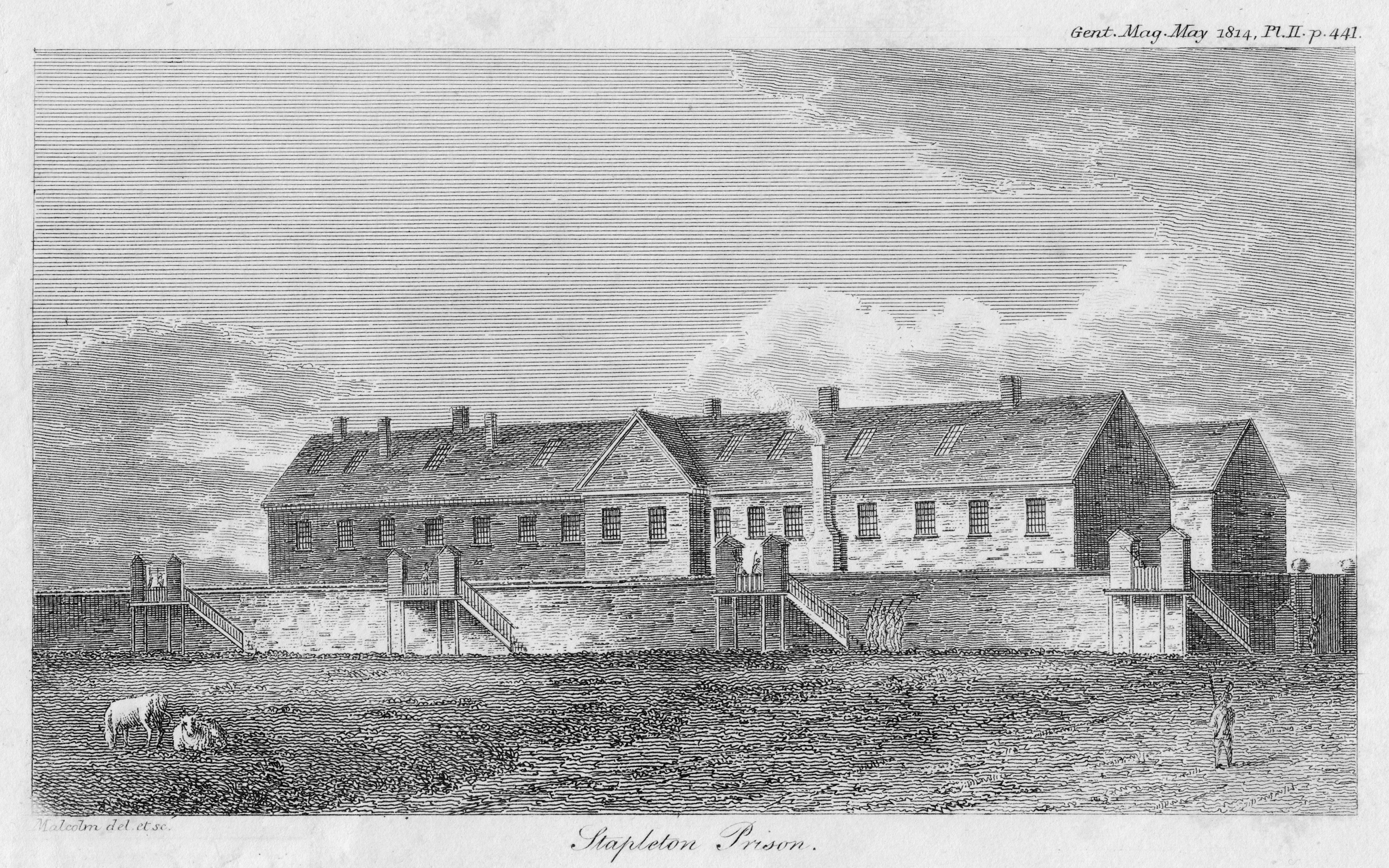
Stapleton Prison, Bristol, where the Royal North Gloucestershire Militia guarded prisoners-of-war.

In the spring of 1805, with Napoleon's 'Army of England' assembling at Boulogne, intensive training in light infantry tactics and brigade manoeuvres was carried out. On 30 May the RNGM began a march from Steyning to Bristol where, with 610 men in 10 companies under Lt-Col Henry Howard, the regiment was part of a brigade under Maj-Gen Josiah Champagné. At Bristol the main militia duty was guarding prisoners-of-war at Stapleton Prison. The RNGM stayed at Bristol until 31 March 1807, when it marched out to Plymouth, where it was stationed at Stonehouse Barracks and continued prisoner-of-war guard duty. In August there was an urgent request for volunteers to transfer to Line regiments, and a draft of three sergeants and 174 men from the RNGM joined the 9th Foot, serving with it through the Peninsular War. In October the RNGM marched to Bognor Barracks for its winter quarters, but an outbreak of disease led to it moving back to Steyning, and then to Littlehampton and Worthing. During the winter the RNGM was brought back to strength by the balloted recruits from Gloucestershire. In Sussex anti-smuggling patrols and harvesting were among the duties carried out. In the spring of 1809 the regiment marched back to Bristol. Guard duties at Stapleton Prison were resumed, apart from a march to quell a disturbance among the Herefordshire Local Militia. The RNGM also provided another large draft of 209 volunteers in 1809, mainly to the 9th Foot, and another 63 in 1810.

On 2 July 1811 the regiment left Bristol under orders for Dartford, but it was diverted to Sandhurst Camp, where the men spent three months under canvas working on the buildings of the new Royal Military College. A detachment remained in huts at Sandhurst into the winter while the rest of the regiment was quartered in Guildford, then to Horsham from January 1812. With another draft of 77 men called for in 1812, recruiting parties were finding it difficult to refill the regiment's ranks. The RNGM spent another summer working at Sandhurst, then in November it marched back to Bristol.

==== Ireland ====
In 1811 an Act had been passed permitting the interchange of militia regiments between English and Irish militia regiments for up to two years, the volunteers receiving a bounty. The RNGM had volunteered at the time, but it was not called for until 1813. It embarked from Bristol on 18 June that year, and served at Dublin. At the end of the year it supplied two complete (six officers and 201 men) to the 56th Foot, followed by another 20 in March 1814. The draft for the 56th served in the Siege of Bergen op Zoom.

After Napoleon's exile to Elba the Militia began to be disembodied in June 1814. The RNGM left Dublin in August and arrived at Liverpool on 2 September. It marched to Cirencester where it was disembodied on 18 September. Unlike some militia regiments, it was not called out again during the short Waterloo campaign.

=== Long Peace ===
Although officers continued to be commissioned into the militia and ballots were still held, the men were rarely assembled for training during the 'Long Peace' after Waterloo. The RNGM met at Cirencester for four weeks' training in May or June in 1820, 1821 and 1825 and in autumn 1831. (Note: It is possible that the Gloucestershires were called out in 1827 or 1840 to deal with riots by weavers and Chartists at Dursley.) The permanent staff was reduced to nine in 1829, and after 1846 vacancies among them were not filled.

Col Robert Kingscote died in February 1840 and was immediately succeeded in command by his nephew and heir, Thomas Henry Kingscote, formerly of the 2nd Life Guards.

== 1852 Reforms ==
The national Militia of the United Kingdom was revived by the Militia Act 1852, enacted during a period of international tension. As before, units were raised and administered on a county basis, and filled by voluntary enlistment (although conscription by means of the Militia Ballot might be used if the counties failed to meet their quotas). Training was for 56 days on enlistment, then for 21–28 days per year, during which the men received full army pay. Under the Act, Militia units could be embodied by Royal Proclamation for full-time service in three circumstances:

1. 'Whenever a state of war exists between Her Majesty and any foreign power'.
2. 'In all cases of invasion or upon imminent danger thereof'.
3. 'In all cases of rebellion or insurrection'.

The quota for Gloucestershire was set at 1993 men and the Lord Lieutenant was instructed to recruit the two moribund regiments up to this strength over the next two years. The RNGM was summoned for its training in October that year and mustered at Cirencester under the command of Col Thomas Kingscote only 15 short of its first-year establishment of 620 men. The drill sergeants were loaned by the 35th Foot. Under the new organisation, militia regiments had an honorary colonel, but were commanded by a lieutenant-colonel. Colonel Kingscote became hon col and Lt-Col Sir Michael Hicks-Beach, 8th Baronet, MP, commanded until his death in 1854. J.W. Wallington, retired captain in the 4th Light Dragoons, was appointed major in 1852 and succeeded Hicks-Beach, holding the command until the 1880s.

=== Crimean War and Ireland ===
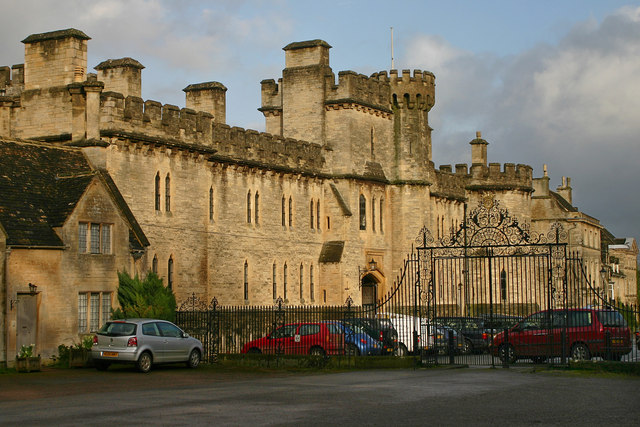
Cecily Hill Barracks, Cirencester, built in 1857 adjacent to Cirencester Park as the headquarters of the Royal North Gloucestershire Militia.

War broke out with Russia in 1854 and large numbers of men volunteered for line regiments in August after the battalion's summer training. Most of the Regular Army having embarked with the expeditionary force sent to the Crimea, the Militia were called out on 26 December. Another 63 men transferred to the 41st Foot in January 1855, and a number of junior officers obtained commissions in the regulars, so recruiting the RNGM to keep it up to its war establishment of 1000 men was a challenge. In February 1856 the regiment was moved by rail from Cirencester to a new hutted camp at Pembroke Dock. The Crimean War ended with the Treaty of Paris the following month. The RNGM left for Cirencester on 4 June and was disembodied there on 12 June.

After this period of service there was no annual training in the spring of 1857, but the RNGM was called out again when large numbers of Regular troops were sent to quell the Indian Mutiny. It was embodied on 3 November 1857 and entrained for Birkenhead where it boarded the steamers Trafalgar and Prince for Dublin, then travelled by train to Athlone. On 14 January 1858 the regiment was moved to the Royal Barracks, Dublin. After a short period of garrison duty it left Dublin on 8 May 1858 aboard the Pacific for passage back to Bristol. The regiment was disembodied at Cirencester on 18 May 1858.

Thereafter the RNGM resumed the routine of annual training. Cecily Hill Barracks was built for the regiment in Cirencester in 1854–1856 by Thomas Fulljames and Frederick S. Waller.

== Cardwell Reforms ==
Under the 'Localisation of the Forces' scheme introduced by the Cardwell Reforms of 1872, Militia regiments were brigaded with their local Regular and Volunteer battalions – for the Gloucestershire Militia this was with the 28th (North Gloucestershire) and 61st (South Gloucestershire) Regiments of Foot in Sub-District No 37 (County of Gloucester) in Western District. The Militia were now under the War Office (WO) rather than their county lords lieutenant.

All recruits, whether Regular or Militia, underwent training at the regimental depot (Horfield Barracks in Gloucester for No 37 Sub-district) before being posted to their battalions; it was not until 1906 that the RNGM was able to drill its recruits at Cirencester. Militia battalions now had a large cadre of permanent staff (about 30). Around a third of the recruits and many young officers went on to join the Regular Army. The Militia Reserve, formed in 1868, consisted of present and former militiamen who undertook to serve overseas in case of war. In 1873 the WO announced that the RNGM would carry out its annual training as part of that year's army autumn manoeuvres on Dartmoor. This would have taken the men away from the harvest: Cirencester Chamber of Agriculture objected, and the WO backed down, allowing the regiment to arrange annual training at a time that was locally convenient. The RNGM continued to assemble in April or May, with training often held in the deer park of Earl Bathurst's Cirencester Park, sometimes brigaded with the local Volunteers.

Although often referred to as brigades, the sub-districts were purely administrative organisations, but in a continuation of the Cardwell Reforms a mobilisation scheme began to appear in the Army List from December 1875. This assigned Regular and Militia units to places in an order of battle of corps, divisions and brigades for the 'Active Army', even though these formations were entirely theoretical, with no staff or services assigned. The North and South Gloucestershire Militia were both assigned to 1st Brigade of 3rd Division, V Corps. The division would have mustered at Gloucester in time of war, and did actually undertake collective training at Minchinhampton Common in 1876 during the international crisis that led to the Russo-Turkish War; the Militia Reserve were also called out during this crisis.

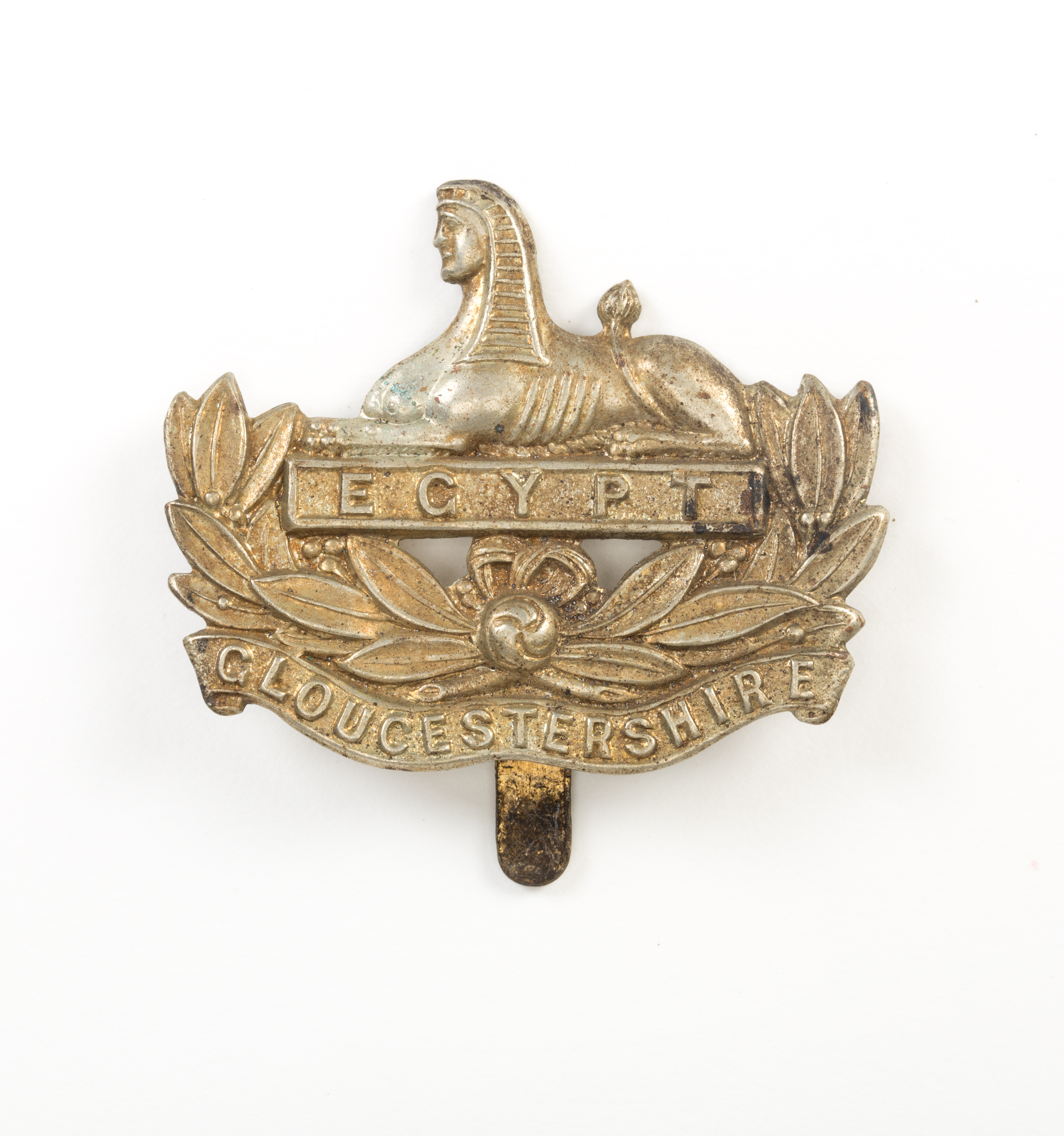
Cap badge of the Gloucestershire Regiment.

== 4th Battalion, Gloucestershire Regiment ==
The Childers Reforms of 1881 took Cardwell's reforms further, with the linked regiments becoming two-battalion regiments and the militia formally joining as their 3rd and 4th Battalions. The 28th and 61st Foot became the Gloucestershire Regiment ('The Glosters') and the RNGM became its 4th Battalion on 1 July 1881. The battalion carried out no training in 1896 because of a smallpox outbreak in the county, but in 1898 it took part in the army's manoeuvres at Aldershot. It returned to Cirencester Park for the 1899 training, but the rifle range was unsafe for the newly issued Lee-Metford rifles, and the week-long musketry course was carried out at Orchard Portman in Somerset.

=== St Helena ===
After the disasters of Black Week at the start of the Second Boer War in December 1899, most of the Regular Army was sent to South Africa, and many militia units were embodied to replace them for home defence and to garrison certain overseas stations. The 4th Gloucesters was embodied at Cirencester on 11 January 1900 and moved by train to Holyhead under Lt-Col Earl Bathurst for service in Ireland once more. The battalion was stationed at Athlone with companies detached to Galway and Castlebar. Some 400 soldiers of the 2nd Battalion Gloucesters, too young or unfit for service in South Africa, were also at Athlone to be trained with the 4th Bn. Meanwhile, two officers and 38 other ranks of the 4th Bn volunteered to serve in South Africa with the regulars.

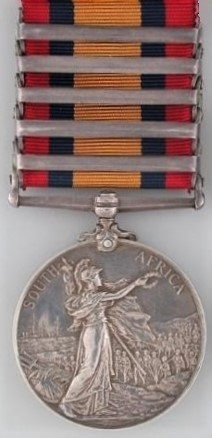
The Queen's South Africa Medal awarded to men of the 4th Gloucesters who served on St Helena; their medals were issued without clasps.

The whole battalion had volunteered for overseas service in South Africa or elsewhere, and it was selected to go to St Helena to guard Boer prisoners of war (POWs) who were being held on the island. The 4th Gloucesters embarked on SS Gothic at Queenstown on 2 April 1900 and sailed via Gibraltar, arriving at St Helena on 21 April. The battalion was stationed at the POW camp established at Deadwood Plain, with a second camp opened later at Broad Bottom. Also among the guards were regulars of the 1st and 2nd Gloucesters, and 117 militiamen of the 3rd Gloucesters who had volunteered for service. According to a letter from a Private of the 4th Bn, the duty at the tented camp was miserable, with incessant wind and rain.

On 6 July 1901 the 3rd (Royal Wiltshire Militia) Bn, Wiltshire Regiment, arrived to relieve the men of 3rd and 4th Gloucesters, who embarked on the Mohawk and arrived at Southampton on 26 July. The battalion was disembodied the following day. The men of 3rd and 4th Bns were awarded the Queen's South Africa Medal and Lt-Col Earl Bathurst was appointed a Companion of the Order of St Michael and St George (CMG) in the South African Honours list published on 26 June 1902. The battalion was awarded the unique Battle Honour St Helena 1900–01. (The only other unit to receive a St Helena battle honour was the 3rd Wiltshires, which was granted St Helena 1901–02.)

== Disbandment ==
There was no annual training for the 4th Gloucesters after their return home in 1902; the following year the battalion trained at Pembroke Dock (its war station in case of mobilisation for hime defence). In 1904 and 1905 battalion training was at Cirencester, in 1906 and 1907 brigade training took place on Salisbury Plain, with the 3rd and 4th Bns of the Glosters brigaded with the 4th Bn Oxfordshire Light Infantry and 3rd Bn Berkshires.

After the Boer War, there were moves to reform the Auxiliary Forces (Militia, Yeomanry and Volunteers) to take their place in the six Army Corps proposed by the Secretary of State for War, St John Brodrick. However, little of Brodrick's scheme was carried out. Under the more sweeping Haldane Reforms in 1908, the Militia was replaced by the Special Reserve, a semi-professional force whose role was to provide reinforcement drafts for Regular units serving overseas in wartime (similar to the former Militia Reserve). While the former RSGLI became the 3rd (Reserve) Battalion, Gloucestershire Regiment, the 4th Bn was disbanded on 31 July despite its greater numerical strength and stronger record of embodiments and overseas service. (Note: Under the Haldane Reforms, the 1st (City of Bristol) Volunteer Battalion, Gloucestershire Regiment, became the new 4th Battalion in the Territorial Force.)

== Commanders ==
=== Colonels ===
The following served as Colonel or Honorary Colonel of the unit after its establishment in 1761:

- Samuel Blackwell, appointed 20 April 1763, colonel in the army 2 July 1779, died 1785
- Winchcombe Henry Hartley, MP, son-in-law of above, promoted 20 March 1792
- Robert Kingscote, promoted 31 March 1794, died 1840
- Thomas Henry Kingscote, nephew of the above, appointed 22 February 1840, died December 1861
- Sir Robert Kingscote, MP, son of the above and formerly Lt-Col in the Scots Fusilier Guards, appointed Hon Col 28 January 1862, until disbandment

=== Lieutenant-colonels ===
The following served as Lt-Col of the unit, second-in-command until 1861, in command thereafter:

- Thomas, 6th Viscount Tracy, appointed Lt-Col Comdt of 2nd or North Bn 9 April 1761
- Winchcombe Henry Hartley, Lt-Col Comdt from 1785, promoted colonel 20 March 1792
- Robert Kingscote, promoted 17 February 1794; promoted colonel 31 March 1794
- Purnell Purnell, appointed 31 March 1794
- Henry Howard, younger brother of Bernard Howard, 12th Duke of Norfolk, promoted 28 November 1798, reigned 1811
- Edward Southwell, 21st Lord de Clifford, promoted 1 July 1811
- William Hicks-Beach, appointed 4 May 1825
- Sir Michael Hicks-Beach, 8th Baronet, nephew of above, promoted 10 February 1844, died 22 November 1854
- J.W. Wallington, formerly 83rd Foot and 3rd Light Dragoons, promoted 16 December 1854, resigned October 1884
- R.B. Hunte, formerly 3rd West India Regiment and 82nd Foot, promoted 22 October 1884, resigned 15 October 1886
- T.W. Chester-Master, promoted 16 October 1886, resigned 31 January 1896
- W.B. Marling, formerly Royal Irish Rifles, promoted 1 February 1896, resigned 16 February 1898
- Seymour Bathurst, 7th Earl Bathurst, promoted 2 March 1898, resigned 1 March 1908
- H.S. Goodlake, formerly Lancashire Fusiliers, promoted 2 March 1908, resigned 4 August 1908

=== The Bathurst connection ===
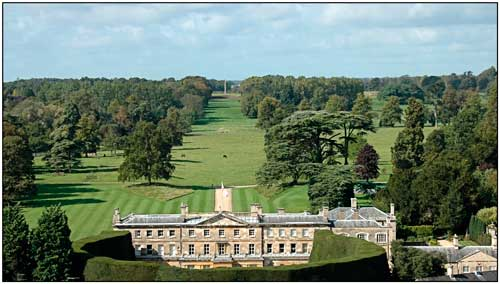
Cirencester Park, ancestral home of the Bathursts; the deer park on the edge of Cirencester and adjacent to Cecily Hill Barracks was used for training camps by the Royal North Gloucestershire Militia.

Allen Bathurst was commissioned as an ensign in the Royal South Gloucester Light Infantry on 16 May 1851, beginning a long family association with the Gloucester Militia. He was promoted to lieutenant on 4 May 1853. and then to captain in the RNGM on 10 November 1854. He was elected MP for Cirencester in 1857. During the invasion scare of 1859–60 he raised the 9th (Cirencester) Gloucestershire Rifle Volunteer Corps on 13 February 1860 with the rank of captain. He retained his commission in the militia and was promoted to major on 22 March 1870 and to the honorary rank of lieutenant-colonel on 3 May 1876. He retired from the militia on 23 March 1878, a few weeks after succeeding his uncle as Earl Bathurst and owner of Cirencester Park. Seymour Bathurst, 7th Earl Bathurst followed his father into the 4th Battalion and was promoted to command it with the rank of lieutenant-colonel on 2 March 1898. His younger brother Allen "Benjamin" Bathurst also served in the regiment. Earl Bathurst retired from the 4th Gloucesters on 2 March 1908 as the regiment was being disbanded, but on 22 September that year he was appointed Honorary Colonel of the 5th Gloucesters, a battalion in the new Territorial Force, descended from his father's 9th Gloucester RVC, to which his brother Benjamin had just been appointed as commanding officer. He retained the position until 1933.

== Heritage and ceremonial ==
=== Precedence ===
In September 1759 it was ordered that militia regiments on service were to take precedence from the date of their arrival in camp. In 1760 this was altered to a system of drawing lots were regiments did duty together. During the War of American Independence the counties were given an order of precedence determined by ballot each year, beginning in 1778. In the French Revolutionary War the order balloted for in 1793 (Gloucestershire was 8th) remained in force until 1802, and another drawing took place at the start of the Napoleonic War (Gloucestershire was 7th), which remained in force until 1833. In that year the King drew the ballots for individual regiments and the resulting list remained in force with minor amendments until the end of the militia; the regiments raised after the peace of 1763 took numbers 38 upwards, the North Gloucesters becoming No 69.

=== Uniforms and insignia ===
When the Gloucestershire Militia regiment was raised in 1761, both battalions wore red coats with blue facings. Officers wore gold lace, changed to silver in 1805 in line with normal militia practice. Drummers often wore 'reversed colours' (ie coats of the regimental facing colour, faced red), but the two Gloucester Militia regiments appear to have clothed their drummers in white coats faced red. By 1820 the drummers wore red faced with blue, appropriate for 'Royal' regiments, which did not reverse their colours. The regimental facings changed to white when the RNGM became a battalion of the Gloucesters, and the uniform thereafter was the same as the Regulars.

A shoulder belt plate dated between 1776 and 1795 consists of a brass oval with the inscription GLOUCESTERSHIRE FUZILEERS round a crude eight-pointed star. An early pewter button bears the lettering N/GLOS^{R}. Buttons from 1840 had the letters N.G. within a crowned star. The men's shako plates of 1844–55 had the Royal Cypher within a circle inscribed ROYAL NORTH GLOUCESTERSHIRE MILITIA; the same design was used on the officers' waistbelt plates of 1855–81. The men's forage cap badge of 1874–81 had the letters RNGM within a crowned laurel wreath.

=== Regimental Colours ===
The first Regimental Colour was blue with the Union Flag in the canton and probably with the Coat of arms of the Lord Lieutenant (in 1761 Lord Chedworth) in the centre. After the regiment had served in Ireland a new pair of colours was presented by the City of Gloucester 1799 reflecting its new Royal designation. These were laid up in 1863 on the centenary of the regiment's formation and replaced by a new pair presented by Lady Emily Kingscote, wife of the Honorary Colonel. These became the colours of the 4th Battalion, Gloucestershire Regiment, and were laid up in Cirencester Parish Church on 27 February 1908 when the battalion was being disbanded. The 1799 colours were moved from Kingscote Park to Cirencester Parish Church in 1959. Both pairs were taken down for safekeeping in 1998, but there was a campaign to have them reinstated in the church. The 1799 Regimental Colour is light blue with the Union canton and the coat of arms of Gloucestershire in the centre. The Queen's Colour is a Union Flag with a crowned 'GIIIR' monogram in the centre. The 1863 Regimental Colour is dark blue with a crowned garland surrounding a central red disc with the lettering 'ROYAL/NORTH/GLOUCESTER/MILITIA'. The battle honour 'St Helena 1900–01' on a scroll was added underneath after the Second Boer War. The Queen's Colour is a Union flag with a crown and a scroll across the central white bar bearing the regimental name.

== See also ==
- Militia (Great Britain)
- Militia (United Kingdom)
- Gloucestershire Militia
- Royal South Gloucestershire Light Infantry Militia
- Gloucestershire Regiment
