= Cirencester Park Polo Club =

Polo club in Gloucestershire, England

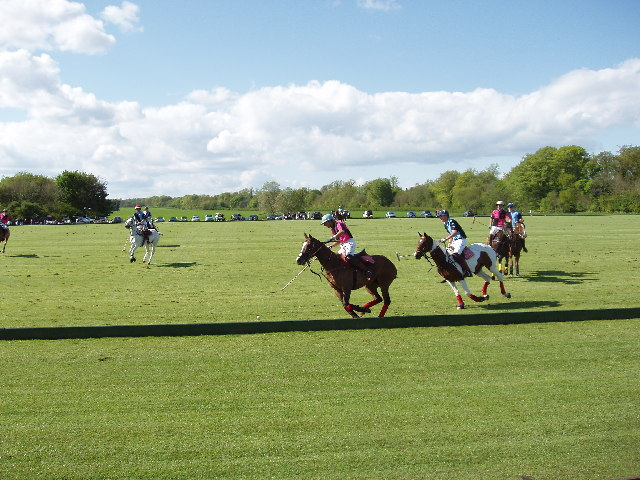
Polo at the Cirencester Park Polo Club

The Cirencester Park Polo Club is a polo club in Cirencester, Gloucestershire, England, situated on the ground of Ivy Lodge within the estate of Earl Bathurst's country house Cirencester Park.

== Overview ==
It was inaugurated in the summer of 1894 by Seymour Bathurst, 7th Earl Bathurst (1864–1943), with two fields for polo matches.

During the First World War, polo was abandoned, as most players joined the Army. It was resumed shortly after World War I. Similarly, it was polo was cancelled during the Second World War of 1939-1945, and polo was only resumed in 1952. In February 2013, Paul Clarkin died while playing polo at the club.

Samuel Vestey, 3rd Baron Vestey (1941–2021) and his brother Mark both served as Chairmen of the club. The current President is Allen Bathurst, 9th Earl Bathurst (born 1961) and the current Chairman, Kuldip Singh Dhillon (born 1950).

King Edward VIII (1894-1972) played polo at the club. Since then, other members of the British royal family like King Charles III (born 1948) and his sons William, Prince of Wales (born 1982) and Prince Harry (born 1984) have played at the club.
