= Allen Bathurst =

Allen Bathurst may refer to:

- Allen Bathurst, 1st Earl Bathurst (1684–1775), British politician
- Allen Bathurst, 6th Earl Bathurst (1832–1892), British politician
- Allen Bathurst, Lord Apsley (1895–1942), British politician
- Allen Bathurst, 9th Earl Bathurst (born 1961), British peer, landowner and property developer
