= QA (company) =

UK based training company

- Years Active: 1984- Present (33 Years)

Executive Team:
- Chief Executive Officer: Josh Hubbert (2025-present)
- Chairman: Sir Charlie Mayfield (2017-present)
- Interim Chief Financial Officer: Emmanuel Walter (2025-present)
- Chief Executive - Higher Education: Simon Nelson (2021-present)
- Revenue: £255.5 Million (FY 2021)
- Courses: 2,200
- Employers: 3,500
- Learners: 1,000,000+
- Website: www.qa.com/

QA Ltd is a provider of technical and business skills in the UK and in North America. They offer technical, management and other associated professional skills. The company is currently involved in providing education and training across self-paced learning, instructor-led learning, apprenticeships, consulting, with higher education as a separate division. It is an accredited training provider for Microsoft, PeopleCert, AWS, ITIL and an approved trainer for the ISO/IEC 20000 Standard (the first international standard for IT service management). It provides certified qualifications for the Association for Project Management and the Project Management Institute as well as Prince2 qualifications.

== History ==
In 1985 three former Intel employees - Mike Cheeseman, Jim Watt and Howard Kornstein - formed QA Training Ltd. The name came from a combination of Queen Anne House in Cirencester and the term Quality Assurance. In the early days, the company rented office space in the Cirencester Park Estate, where the Earl Bathurst was the company's landlord.

Shortly afterwards, QA Ltd began to provide technical training for IBM's European staff. In the early 1990s IBM acquired 10% of QA Ltd and co-opted Howard Ford to the company's board.

In the following year, 1991, the company made investment plans to grow by around 30% before its performance was significantly hindered, with IBM reporting an unprecedented loss of US$5bn in the last quarter of 1992 alone, coupled with the negative effects of the global recession and the Gulf War. It was a survival period for QA Ltd, but the company emerged and went on to acquire the training division of CapGemini, enabling it to develop Business Analysis products and partnerships in several other geographies. In 2006 QA Ltd was bought by Interquad, with Interquad becoming QA-Interquad. Later, QA Ltd went on to acquire competitor companies Xpertise Group, Remarc Group and Aikona Management, before refinancing to the tune of £50m in 2014.

In November 2016, QA acquired the Training Foundation Limited (Tap Learning). In June 2017, CVC Capital Partners Fund VI acquired QA from Bregal Investments. In July 2019, QA acquired online learning platform Cloud Academy. In September 2019, CEO William Macpherson retired and was succeeded as CEO by Paul Geddes. In July 2021, QA announced that it completed the acquisition of Circus Street. In June 2024, QA announced a rebrand in which the three companies (Cloud Academy, Circus Street, and QA) became one business.

== Services ==
QA offers learning across multiple modalities:

- Instructor-led training: QA provides around 2,200 courses and certifications plus bespoke learning and managed learning services to their clients. Programmes offered include Cyber Security, Agile, DevOps, Project Management, Leadership, IT Service Management, and Digital Transformation, and Data, Analytics & AI.
- Self-paced training: QA provides training and hands-on labs on their QA learning platform. Content covers AI, Data, Cloud, E-Commerce, Marketing, Programming, and more, including options to build configurable learning and take certification prep courses.
- Apprenticeships: QA offers tech and digital apprenticeships from Level 3 (GCSE) to Level 7 degree apprenticeships in England and Scotland. Programme areas include Cloud Computing, Cyber Security, Data, Analytics & AI, DevOps, Digital Marketing, IT, Software Development and Professional Management. QA has partnered with Microsoft to develop Data and Azure Cloud apprenticeships, which started running in 2022.
- Consulting Academy: Launched in 2011, QA recruits, trains and deploys individuals in technologies and tech skills.

QA Higher Education serves as a separate division:

- Higher Education: 88 higher education programmes are on offer with partnerships from Northumbria University, Solent University, Ulster University, Middlesex University, London Metropolitan University, University of Roehampton and the University of South Wales. Courses range from foundation level to postgraduate degrees.
