= Seymour Bathurst =

Seymour Bathurst may refer to:

- Seymour Thomas Bathurst (1793–1834), English soldier and politician
- Seymour Bathurst, 7th Earl Bathurst (1864–1943), British nobleman, soldier and newspaper owner
