= Howard Ford =

Howard Ford may refer to:

- Howard Ford (decathlete) (1905–1986), English track and field athlete
- Howard Ford (businessman) (born 1950), British businessman
- Howard J. Ford, English filmmaker
