= History of electroconvulsive therapy in the United Kingdom =

Electroconvulsive therapy (ECT, in the past sometimes called electric convulsion therapy, convulsion treatment or electroplexy) is a controversial psychiatric treatment in which seizures are induced with electricity. ECT was first used in the United Kingdom in 1939 and, although its use has been declining for several decades, it was still given to about 11,000 people a year in the early 2000s.

In contemporary psychiatric practice, ECT is used mainly in the treatment of depression. It is occasionally used in the treatment of other disorders such as schizophrenia. When undergoing modern ECT, a patient is given an anaesthetic and a muscle relaxant. A brief-pulse electric current of about 800 milliamperes is passed between two electrodes on the head for several seconds, causing a seizure. The resulting convulsion is modified by the muscle relaxant. ECT is usually given on an inpatient basis; about one in five treatments are given on an outpatient basis. Treatment is usually given twice a week (occasionally three times a week) for a total of 6–12 treatments, although courses may be longer or shorter. About 70 per cent of ECT patients are women. About 1,500 ECT patients a year in the UK are treated without their consent under the Mental Health Acts or the provisions of common law.

== Early years: 1938–1969 ==
ECT was invented in Italy in 1938. In 1939 it was brought to England and replaced cardiazol (metrazol) as the preferred method of inducing seizures in convulsion therapy in British mental hospitals. Although soon established as especially useful in the treatment of depression, it was also used on people with a wide variety of mental disorders. There was large variation in the amount of ECT used between different hospitals. As well as being used therapeutically, ECT was used to control the behaviour of patients. Originally given in unmodified form (without anaesthetics and muscle relaxants) hospitals gradually switched to using modified ECT, a process that was accelerated by a famous legal case.

=== Origins of ECT ===
ECT originated as a new form of convulsive therapy, rather than as a completely new treatment. Convulsive therapy was introduced in 1934 by Hungarian neuropsychiatrist Ladislas J Meduna who, believing that schizophrenia and epilepsy were antagonistic disorders, induced seizures in patients with first camphor and then cardiazol.

Meanwhile, in Rome, professor of neuropsychiatry Ugo Cerletti was doing research on epilepsy and using electric shocks to induce seizures in dogs. Cerletti visited the Rome abattoir where electric shocks were used to render pigs comatose prior to slaughter. Inspired by the fact that the pigs were not actually killed by a voltage of 125 volts driving an electric current through the head for a few tenths of a second, he decided to experiment on a person. In April 1938 Cerletti tried ECT for the first time on a man who had been brought to his clinic in a confused state by police. The man was given a total of 11 treatments and recovered. It later emerged that he had had cardiazol treatment in another hospital three months previously. Cerletti called his treatment "electroshock" and developed a theory that it worked by causing the brain to produce vital substances that he called "acro-agonines" (from the Greek for "extreme struggle"). He put his theory into practice by injecting patients with a suspension of electroshocked pig brain, with encouraging results. Electroshocked pig brain therapy was used by a few psychiatrists in Italy, France and Brazil but did not become as popular as ECT. Cardiazol convulsion therapy was soon replaced by ECT all over the world. Cerletti and Bini were nominated for a Nobel prize but did not get one.

As a trace origin, galvanism may have been a more primitive form of ECT such that James Lind was among the first to suggest electroshock therapy for insanity in the late 1700s.

=== Early use of ECT in the UK ===
ECT arrived in the UK with Lothar Kalinowsky, one of Cerletti's assistants, who was on his way to the USA. Kalinowsky demonstrated Cerletti's technique at the Burden Neurological Institute (BNI) and wrote an article about ECT which appeared in the Lancet in December 1939. He said that electrically induced seizures were cheaper and easier to administer than cardiazol seizures. The first paper on ECT by British authors appeared three weeks later in the same journal. Gerald Fleming, the medical superintendent of Barnwood House Hospital in Gloucester and editor of the Journal of Mental Science, psychiatrist Frederic Golla and neurophysiologist William Grey Walter (both from the BNI) described how they had tested the new method of convulsion therapy on five chronic schizophrenic patients from Barnwood House. Electrical parameters, technique of administration, seizures and electroencephalograms, but not therapeutic results, were discussed. An accompanying editorial entitled "More shocks" said that ECT "may well turn out to be a valuable step forward" but criticised Fleming's claim that the use of ECT required only minimal training, expertise and patient preparation. The editorial also queried Kalinowsky's dismissal of concerns about brain damage. "There is still a chance" it said "that the brain has nemo me impune lacessit for its motto."

ECT soon became more popular than cardiazol convulsion therapy in mental hospitals in the UK. It was quickly identified as being especially useful in the treatment of affective psychosis. The therapeutic value of ECT in schizophrenia was recognised as limited, but some psychiatrists saw it as useful to control the behaviour of institutionalised patients who had been diagnosed as schizophrenic. Some psychiatrists thought that ECT should be restricted to the treatment of depression; others used it in the treatment of a wide variety of disorders, for example, schizophrenia, epilepsy, neurosis, and hysteria. It was also used on people who had suffered war trauma. By the mid 1950s there was a 20 fold difference in the rate of ECT use in mental hospitals in the UK, and a similar difference in its rate of use in teaching hospitals. In the 1940s and 1950s ECT machines used sine-wave current and patients were given a shock lasting a fraction of a second.

Views on ECT were generally positive in the early days of its use. The Ministry of Labour ran a recruitment campaign for psychiatric nurses featuring a picture of someone undergoing ECT. Barnwood House, which catered for "ladies and gentlemen suffering from nervous and mental disorders", said in advertisements that it offered "all the most modern methods of treatment including electric shock and prefrontal leucotomy". There were however dissenting voices. Cyril Birnie, the medical superintendent of St Bernard's Hospital, Middlesex, raised concerns about persistent intellectual deficits following treatment and said that mental patients were "in danger of having a pretty thin time of it".

=== Anaesthesia ===
In the 1940s and early 1950s ECT was usually given in unmodified form, that is, without muscle relaxants, and the seizure resulted in a full-scale convulsion. An anaesthetic was used by a few psychiatrists but most considered it unnecessary as the electric shock produced instant unconsciousness. ECT was even occasionally used to anaesthetise patients for psychosurgical operations.

A rare but serious complication of unmodified ECT was fracture or dislocation of the long bones, caused by the violence of the muscular contractions during the convulsion. In the 1940s psychiatrists began to experiment with curare, the muscle-paralysing South American poison, in order to modify the convulsions. The introduction in 1951 of succinylcholine, a safer synthetic alternative to curare, led to the more widespread use of modified ECT. A short-acting anaesthetic was usually given in addition to the muscle relaxant in order to spare patients the terrifying feeling of suffocation that can be experienced with muscle relaxants. By the mid 1950s most hospitals in Britain routinely used modified ECT, although a few still used unmodified ECT or ECT with muscle relaxants but without anaesthetic. In 1957 a patient who had sustained fractures to both hips whilst undergoing unmodified ECT at a London hospital took legal action. He lost the case but it had far-reaching consequences, encouraging a debate about ECT techniques which led to the abandonment of routine use of unmodified ECT in British hospitals. The case is also famous for having established the Bolam principle.

=== Intensive ECT ===
Most patients in the early years of ECT were given treatment two or three times a week, or occasionally daily; a few psychiatrists experimented with more intensive treatment. At St James' Hospital, Portsmouth, William Liddell Milligan gave neurotic patients ECT up to four times daily. His aim was "to reduce the patient to the infantile level, in which he is completely helpless and doubly incontinent". Robert Russell and Lewis Page tried a slightly different regime, giving patients one or two sessions of ECT a day but with several additional electric shocks during the convulsion. This treatment was given to over 3,800 patients at the Three Counties Hospital. Arlesey, Bedfordshire. The Page-Russell technique was taken up by Scottish-American psychiatrist D Ewen Cameron who used it to "depattern" his patients at the McGill University in Canada. It later emerged that the CIA had put funds into Professor Cameron's work. In 1988 nine of his former patients received compensation from the US government; the Canadian government later compensated those patients whose treatment had not been funded by the CIA and court cases continue to this day.

Robert Russell set up a company, Ectron Ltd, to manufacture ECT machines. At one time nearly every hospital in the UK was equipped with Ectron machines.

== The middle years: 1960–1985 ==
The next two and a half decades saw ECT maintain its place as a commonly used psychiatric treatment in spite of the introduction of neuroleptics, antidepressants and benzodiazepines into British psychiatric practice in the late 1950s and early 1960s. In the early 1970s there were an estimated 50,000 courses annually in the UK; by 1985 this had dropped to about 24,000. This period saw stirrings of professional and public disquiet over some aspects of ECT use; in response the Royal College of Psychiatrists produced guidelines and carried out an extensive survey of ECT use. The Mental Health Act 1983 introduced a legal framework for the use of ECT on non-consenting patients.

=== Guidelines ===
In 1976 the Royal College of Psychiatrists received a request from the regional medical officer of the South East Thames regional health authority for advice on giving ECT to non-consenting patients. One of the region's mental hospitals had been the subject of a committee of enquiry, and the use of force when giving patients ECT had been criticised. In Parliament, Secretary of State David Ennals had referred to the death of one woman following ECT as "disturbing".

The Royal College of Psychiatrists duly produced guidelines, in the form of an eleven-page article in the British Journal of Psychiatry. The guidelines summarised the current state of knowledge about ECT, set standards for its administration and discussed aspects of consent. ECT was, the guidelines concluded, an effective treatment for endogenous depression. There was less certainty about its value in mania, and little evidence for its usefulness in schizophrenia. The guidelines said that the possibility of long-term memory impairment following ECT had been "too little investigated". Recommendations for the administration of ECT included: anaesthesia for all patients, a pre-treatment physical examination, avoidance of currents greatly above seizure threshold and the use of machines with a choice of waveforms. The question of electrode placement was left open: evidence of less memory loss with unilateral electrode placement was noted, so too was psychiatrists' preference for bilateral electrode placement. The guidelines recommended that informal patients who were unable or unwilling to consent to ECT should be sectioned and a second opinion obtained (unless the need for treatment was seen as urgent).

=== Survey ===
In 1981 the Royal College of Psychiatrists published the results of an extensive survey into the use of ECT in Great Britain. It revealed many psychiatrists ignoring the guidelines. “ECT in Britain: a shameful state of affairs” read the title of a Lancet editorial on the results of the survey. Less than half of the clinics visited by the researchers met the minimum standards in the guidelines. In many clinics, ECT was being given by "bored and uninterested staff with obsolete machines operated by ignorant and uncaring psychiatrists". One clinic, where the staff used the phrase "old is gold" was using a 30-year-old machine mended with sticking plaster.

A total of about 27,000 people received ECT in 1980. The authors of the survey estimated that ECT use had approximately halved since the early 1970s. There was wide regional variation, with the heaviest user, Jersey and Guernsey, using ECT at more than 5 times the rate of the lowest user, the Oxford region. There was a 17 fold difference in rates of ECT use between different hospitals and in many hospitals a large proportion of ECT was given by just one or two psychiatrists. Some psychiatrists didn't use ECT at all; others thought that the main, or even the only, indication for ECT was in psychotic or endogenous depression; yet others thought it appropriate in the treatment of a wide range of disorders. The median age of patients was mid-fifties. About 900 people over 80, and about 420 people under 20, were given ECT in 1980. 69 per cent were women. 21 per cent were treated with unilateral ECT.

The survey found that a small number of clinics were still, in 1980, occasionally using unmodified ECT. That same year it emerged that ECT without anaesthetic had been used to control a patient's behaviour in Broadmoor Hospital; such use was defended by the Royal College of Psychiatrists and the Department of Health.

=== Legislation ===
The Mental Health Act 1959 had given psychiatrists implied authority to treat detained patients without consent. The Mental Health Act 1983 gave psychiatrists explicit authority to treat detained patients without consent.

Psychosurgery and the surgical implantation of hormones to reduce male sexual drive were classified as irreversible treatments that could only be carried out on consenting patients (section 57 of part IV of the Act); ECT was classified as a slightly less serious treatment that could be given to non-consenting patients if certain procedures were followed (section 58). The patient had to be detained (if they were not already detained), then a psychiatrist from the Mental Health Act Commission had to authorise treatment. If the treating psychiatrist decided there was an urgent need for ECT it could go ahead without authorisation from a Mental Health Act Commission psychiatrist (section 62).

ECT was not actually put on the face of the Bill, in recognition of the fact that some people thought it belonged in section 57 with irreversible treatments and a subsequent Secretary of State might wish to move it there.

The Mental Health Act 1983 covers England and Wales. The Mental Health (Scotland) Act 1984 and the Mental Health (Northern Ireland) Order 1986 made similar provisions for the use of ECT on non-consenting patients in Scotland and Northern Ireland.

== Recent years: 1986-2010 ==
The use of ECT in the UK has continued to fall, from about 23,000 courses in 1986 to about 11,000 in 2002. There is still marked variation in use, both in prescribing and in standards of administration. The Royal College of Psychiatrists produced three more sets of guidelines, and carried out two more surveys. The National Health Service produced guidelines on ECT use in 2003 and the following year the Royal College of Psychiatrists set up a voluntary accreditation scheme for ECT clinics. Use in the Channel Islands has never been officially confirmed or denied but believed to take place, though with similar guidelines to the UK.

=== More guidelines and surveys ===
The Royal College of Psychiatrists produced another set of guidelines in 1989, followed by a survey which showed that, although there had been improvements since the previous survey in 1980, many hospitals still failed to meet the standards set out in the guidelines. This time the survey was limited to East Anglia, and showed a 12 fold difference in the rate of ECT use between hospitals. Further guidelines appeared in 1995, followed by yet another survey with similar results. There were still problems with the training and supervision of doctors administering ECT; only a quarter of clinics were rated as good and two-thirds failed to meet the most recent standards. In 2004 the Royal College of Psychiatrists set up a voluntary accreditation scheme for ECT clinics. Two years on, only a minority of clinics in England, Wales, Northern Ireland and the Republic of Ireland had signed up.

In 2003 the National Institute for Clinical Excellence, a government body which was set up to standardize treatment throughout the National Health Service, issued guidance on the use of ECT. Its use was recommended "only to achieve rapid and short-term improvement of severe symptoms after an adequate trial of treatment options has proven ineffective and/or when the condition is considered to be potentially life-threatening in individuals with severe depressive illness, catatonia or a prolonged manic episode". The guidance got a mixed reception. It was welcomed by an editorial in the British Medical Journal, but the Royal College of Psychiatrists launched an unsuccessful appeal.

=== Effectiveness and adverse effects ===
In 2003 the UK ECT Review Group, led by Professor Geddes of Oxford University, reviewed the evidence and concluded that ECT had been shown to be an effective short-term treatment for depression—as measured by symptom rating scales—in physically healthy adults, and that it was probably more effective than drug treatment. Bilateral ECT was more effective than unilateral, and high-dose was more effective than low-dose. Their conclusions were qualified: most of the trials were old and conducted on small numbers of patients; some groups (for example, elderly people, women with postpartum depression and people with treatment-resistant depression) were under-represented in the trials even though ECT is believed to be especially effective for them.

A review of the literature found that between 29 per cent and 55 per cent (depending on the study) of people who had undergone ECT reported persistent memory loss.

=== Treatment without consent ===
Although the use of ECT on consenting patients fell by over a half between 1986 and 2002, its use on non-consenting patients remained constant at just over 2,000 people a year (in England and Wales). About two-thirds of those treated without their consent lack capacity, the rest are "capable but refusing". As well as those treated under sections 58 and 62 of the Mental Health Act 1983, a small number of informal patients are treated without their consent under the common law. In 2002, just over one in five ECT patients had not consented to treatment.

In Scotland the Mental Health (Care and Treatment) (Scotland) Act 2003 gave patients with capacity the right to refuse ECT.

In 2007 Parliament in London considered amendments to the Mental Health Act 1983, including one which would give capable people the right to refuse ECT in some circumstances. Section 58A of the Mental Health Act 2007 gives people who retain decision-making capacity the right to refuse ECT, unless their psychiatrist thinks they need it urgently. It came into force in November 2008 and led to a fall of about 23 per cent in the number of non-consenting patients.
