= Barnwood House Hospital =

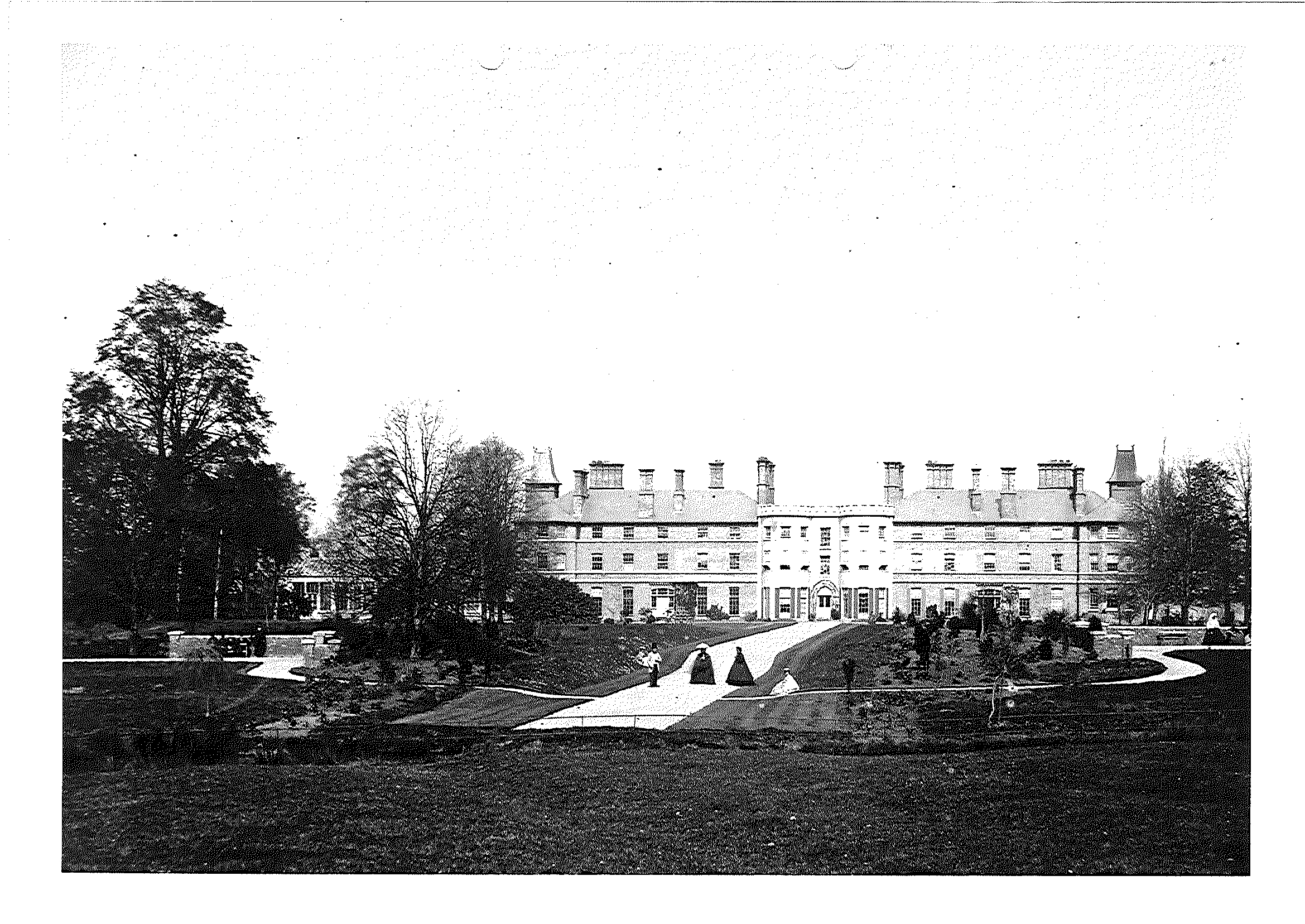
- Barnwood House Hospital in 1860

- Shown in Gloucestershire

Geography
- Location: Barnwood, Gloucestershire, England, United Kingdom
- Coordinates: 51°51′35″N 2°12′15″W

Organisation
- Care system: Public NHS
- Type: Psychiatric

History
- Founded: 1860
- Closed: 1968

Links
- Lists: Hospitals in England

Barnwood House Hospital was a private mental hospital in Barnwood, Gloucester, England. It was founded by the Gloucester Asylum Trust in 1860 as Barnwood House Institution and later became known as Barnwood House Hospital. The hospital catered for well-to-do patients, with reduced terms for those in financial difficulties. It was popular with the military and clergy, and once counted an archbishop amongst its patients. During the late nineteenth century Barnwood House flourished under superintendent Frederick Needham, making a healthy profit and receiving praise from the Commissioners in Lunacy. Even the sewerage system was held up as a model of good asylum practice. After the First World War service patients, including war poet and composer Ivor Gurney, were treated with a regime of psychotherapy and recreations such as cricket.

During the 1960s Barnwood House experienced financial problems and closed in 1968. The grounds are now an arboretum run by Gloucester City Council. Barnwood House Trust continues to exist as a charity that supports research and awards grants to people with physical or mental disabilities in Gloucestershire. The Chief Executive is Sally Byng.

== Origins ==
Barnwood House opened its doors to patients on 6 January 1860, but its origins go back to the 18th century. In 1794 the governors of Gloucester Infirmary decided to follow the York example and raise a subscription for building an asylum. Sir George Onesiphorus Paul, philanthropist and prison reformer, was asked to draft a scheme for the management of the institution. The plans were put on hold as legislation was pending in Parliament. The County Asylums Act, which enabled counties to set up asylums for pauper lunatics on the rates, was passed in 1808 and the subscribers formed a union with the county and the city to build a joint asylum. Wotton asylum was opened in 1823 and the union lasted until 1856, when the County bought out the subscribers and the asylum became a county asylum for paupers. The subscribers began the search for new accommodation for their wealthy and charity patients. In 1858 they purchased and adapted Barnwood House in the village of Barnwood to the east of Gloucester (subsequent boundary changes brought the village inside the city boundary). Barnwood House Institution was intended for two classes of patients, as explained in 1882 regulations:

"FIRST – Patients in more or less affluent circumstances, who shall contribute, according to the accommodation required, such sums as may be agreed upon. SECOND – Patients in limited circumstances, but in a position in life to render them unsuitable for admission into County Asylums, who shall be received at such reduced rates of payment as the Committee, upon consideration of the circumstances of each case, may determine; and some even gratuitously, - preference being given to recent and curable cases, to which the gratuitous Patients are to be wholly confined."

== Frederick Needham ==
Dr. Frederick Needham, former superintendent of York Asylum, became medical superintendent of Barnwood House in 1874. Under his direction the institution expanded, housing 129 patients by 1882, compared with 60 in 1864, and was described as a "model lunatic hospital".

"A model lunatic hospital: The Commissioners in Lunacy report that, on each recurring visit they find improvements completed or in progress, and an evident desire on the part of the committee, as of the superintendent, to render the hospital as perfect an institution for the care and treatment of the insane as it is possible to arrive at…. The rates of board charges are most moderate, the dietary is generous, the salaries of the officers are liberal, and the entertainments are sumptuous, and yet a profit of upwards of £4,000 a year is realized."

Even the sanitary arrangements were singled out for praise:

"The same thoughtfulness and judicious provision which have brought the general management of Barnwood House Asylum to such a high pitch of excellence have evidently been brought to bear on its sanitary arrangements….The water-closets are all self-acting by means of rods, not wires, and have Tyler's enamelled iron S-trapped pans and 6 inch [150 mm] soil pipes"

A darker side to the "model lunatic hospital" was revealed by newspaper reports of inquests into suicides, including that of the unexplained death of Barnwood's junior assistant medical officer, Richard Bush Drury Batt, in 1886. (The inquest revealed that Batt had complained of the reoccurrence of a complaint which resulted in a pain in his back. The autopsy found that one of his kidneys had protruded into his stomach but could find no obvious cause of death.)

Whilst at Barnwood, where he lived with his wife Charlotte (née Shooter), Needham took part in the regular entertainments and concerts, once playing the part of King Giltgingerbread in The Enchanted Princess; wrote a number of papers, including Brain Exhaustion and Insanity in relation to Society; and was president of the Psychological Association of Great Britain and Ireland in 1887. He left Barnwood in 1892 to become a Commissioner in Lunacy, and was knighted in 1915.

Rules for attendants at Barnwood House, published in 1880, stress the importance of obeying the orders of superintendent and matron, confidentiality, kindness and consideration towards patients.

- Rule number 9: "The delusions of Patients are to be treated with most considerate kindness, and in no way made the subject of merriment or amusement."
- Rule number 11: "No attendant shall indulge in or express angry or vindictive feelings towards the Patients..."
- Rule number 12 "Nothing in the way of punishment is ever to be used to the Insane."

== "All the most modern methods of treatment" ==
An association with the Burden Neurological Institute from 1939 meant that Barnwood House patients were used in early experiments with electroconvulsive therapy and psychosurgery. William Ross Ashby, psychiatrist and pioneer of cybernetics, built his "Homeostat" machine in a laboratory at Barnwood House in the 1950s.

The Burden Neurological Institute opened in Stoke Gifford, near Bristol, Gloucestershire, in 1939 and formed links with Barnwood Hospital. The first published report on the use of electroconvulsive therapy on patients in England was a collaboration between Gerald Fleming, the medical superintendent of Barnwood House and editor of the Journal of Mental Science, and Frederic Golla and William Grey Walter from the Burden Neurological Institute. German psychiatrist Lothar Kalinowsky had witnessed ECT in Italy and demonstrated it at the Burden Neurological Institute; five patients at Barnwood House were selected as guinea pigs for the new form of convulsive therapy.

"We selected five psychotics for treatment at Barnwood House. Altogether 75 shocks have been administered, as a result of which there have been 50 major convulsions and 25 minor attacks. There have been no unpleasant sequelae, and none of the patients has refused further treatments. This small preliminary series was not intended to provide data on the therapeutic value of the treatment – in only one of the patients could a remission be hoped for with any confidence – but was designed to throw light on the relative advantages and dangers of the method."

The advantages were immediately apparent:

"For the operator, only a small amount of training and experience is necessary, and a knowledge of physics, though desirable on general grounds, is not essential….the apparatus is comparatively cheap and portable, and preparation of the patient need take no more than a minute."

Four certified patients at Barnwood House were also amongst the first in England to undergo prefrontal leucotomy, again as a result of a collaboration between Barnwood and the Burden Neurological Institute. The operations were performed in April 1941 by surgeon Francis Wilfred Willway with a paperknife. None of the first four Barnwood House patients left hospital after the operation, but were described as more manageable and well behaved. Barnwood House then employed the services of neurosurgeon Wylie McKissock to continue the leucotomy programme.

William Ross Ashby, pioneer of cybernetics, was director of research at Barnwood House from 1947 to 1959, before becoming director of research at BNI and then professor of Biophysics and Electrical Engineering at the University of Illinois, Urbana, Illinois, USA. Whilst at Barnwood House he wrote Design for a Brain and An Introduction to Cybernetics, and constructed a black box with magnets which he called the Homeostat, "the closest thing to a synthetic brain so far designed by man".

From 1948 to 1962 Barnwood House advertised its services in the Journal of Mental Science with the following words:

"A REGISTERED HOSPITAL (outside the National Health Service) for the CARE and TREATMENT of LADIES and GENTLEMEN suffering from NERVOUS and MENTAL DISORDERS. Within two miles [3 km] of the Western and London Midland Regional Railway Stations at Gloucester, the Hospital is easily accessible by rail from London and all parts of the United Kingdom. It is beautifully situated at the foot of the Cotswold Hills, and stands in its own grounds of over 300 acres [1.2 km²]. Voluntary Patients of both sexes are also received for treatment. Special accommodation is also provided at three villa residences, all of which stand in their own grounds and are entirely separate from the main Hospital. All the most modern methods of treatment including electric shock and prefrontal leucotomy are used."

But the "most modern methods of treatment" were losing their allure by the 1960s and, in spite of a new advertisement appearing in 1963 with no mention of ladies and gentleman, or leucotomy and electric shock, and the railway stations replaced by the A417, Barnwood House experienced financial difficulties and closed in 1968.

== Recent history ==
The hospital closed in 1968 and not finding a buyer to take it on, the two wings of the main building were demolished and the housing of Grovelands and Cherston court built there. All that was left was the central block which became a residential house. From 1978 it was owned by the Forrest family and was used as a boarding house for girls from the nearby Selwyn Independent School for Girls in Matson, Gloucester. In 1983 the owners no longer took in boarders and it continued as a private residence until it was bought by a property developer. It was demolished in 2000 and a number of new houses built in its place. The remainder of its grounds are now Barnwood Arboretum, cared and conserved for by Gloucester City Council in conjunction with the Friends of Barnwood Arboretum.

== Notable staff ==
- Dorothy May Price (1872-1927), assistant matron, 1903 until at least 1911. Price trained firstly at the Evelina Children's Hospital, and then as a general nurse under Eva Luckes at The London Hospital between 1898 and 1900.

== Notable patients ==
- Katherine Armstrong, murdered by her husband in 1921
- Alfred Caldicott, musician
- Ivor Gurney, Gloucester-born poet and composer.
- Edith Picton-Turbervill, social reformer, writer and Labour MP.

== See also ==
- Coney Hill Hospital (Second Gloucestershire County Asylum), a mental health facility also at Barnwood
