= Cecily Hill Barracks =

Barracks in Cirencester, Gloucestershire, England

- Cirencester
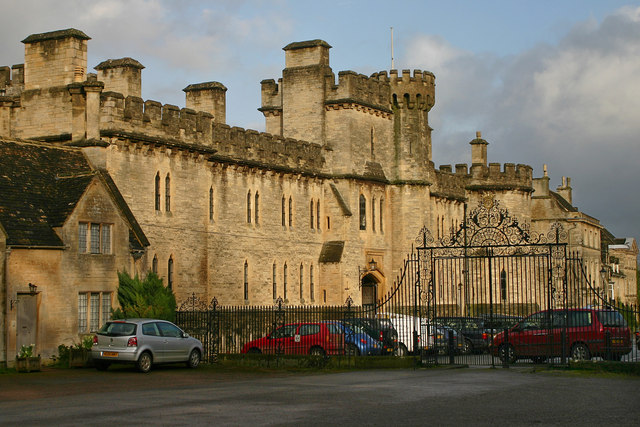
- Cecily Hill Barracks

Site information
- Type: Barracks
- Operator: British Army

Location
- Location within Gloucestershire
- Coordinates: 51°43′05″N 01°58′30″W

Site history
- Built: 1857
- Built for: War Office
- In use: 1857-1945

Garrison information
- Occupants: 4th Battalion Gloucestershire Regiment

Cecily Hill Barracks is a former military installation in Cirencester in Gloucestershire. The former keep for the barracks (known locally as The Castle, Cecily Hill) stands at the entrance to Cirencester Park.

== History ==
The barracks were built in 1857 as the Royal North Gloucestershire Militia Armoury. In 1881, following the Childers Reforms, the barracks became the depot of the 4th Battalion of the Gloucestershire Regiment. During the Second World War they became the local base for the Home Guard.

After the Army had no more use for the barracks, it became a commercial building owned by the Bathurst Estate. During the 1990s it was used as the headquarters for IT training company QA Training Ltd.

It was subsequently used by Cirencester College, who gave it the name "The Castle". Cirencester College moved out of the Castle in 2013, after which the building received an extensive £3 million renovation by the new occupants, money.co.uk, in collaboration with designer Laurence Llewelyn-Bowen.

The Castle is still used for commercial purposes today, currently host to a cyber-security company. It is a Grade II* listed building.
