= Benjamin Bathurst =

Benjamin Bathurst may refer to:

- Sir Benjamin Bathurst (courtier) (c. 1639–1704), MP for Bere Alston & New Romney, Cofferer of the Household, British East India Company's governor
- Benjamin Bathurst (MP for Gloucester) (1692–1767), MP for Cirencester, 1713–1727, Gloucester 1727–1754, and Monmouth, 1754–1767; younger brother of the 1st Earl Bathurst
- Benjamin Bathurst (1711–1767), MP for Gloucestershire, 1734–1741, and Cirencester, 1754–1761
- Benjamin Bathurst (diplomat) (1784–1809?), British diplomat who disappeared in 1809; third son of Henry Bathurst, Bishop of Norwich
- Benjamin Bathurst (politician, born 1872) (1872–1947), MP for Cirencester in 1895–1906 and 1910–18; third son of sixth Earl Bathurst
- Benjamin Bathurst, 2nd Viscount Bledisloe (1899–1979), British barrister
- Sir Benjamin Bathurst (Royal Navy officer) (1936–2025), First Sea Lord, 1993–1995; grandson of the MP for Cirencester above
- Sir Ben Bathurst (born 1964), British general, son of the Royal Navy officer above

== See also ==
- Earl of Bathurst
