= Seymour Thomas Bathurst =

English politician and soldier (1793–1834)

Lieutenant Colonel The Honourable Seymour Thomas Bathurst
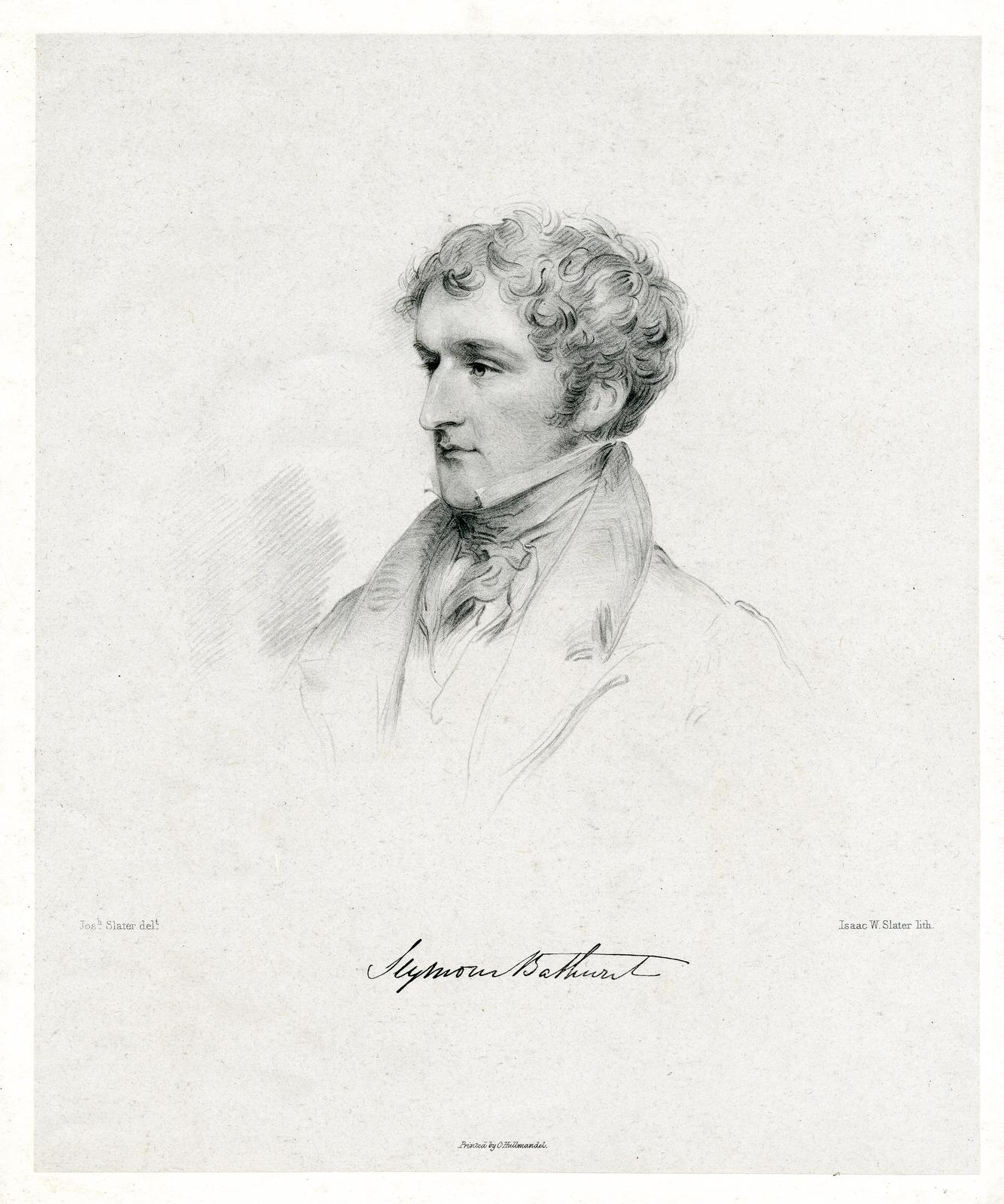

Member of Parliament for St Germans
- In office 17 June 1818 – 2 June 1826
- Preceded by: William Henry Pringle
- Succeeded by: Charles Ross

Personal details
- Born: 27 October 1793
- Died: 10 April 1834 (aged 40)
- Party: Tory
- Spouse: Julia Hankey (m. 1829)
- Children: Allen; Mary
- Parent(s): Henry Bathurst, 3rd Earl Bathurst; Georgina Lennox
- Education: Eton College
- Occupation: Politician; soldier

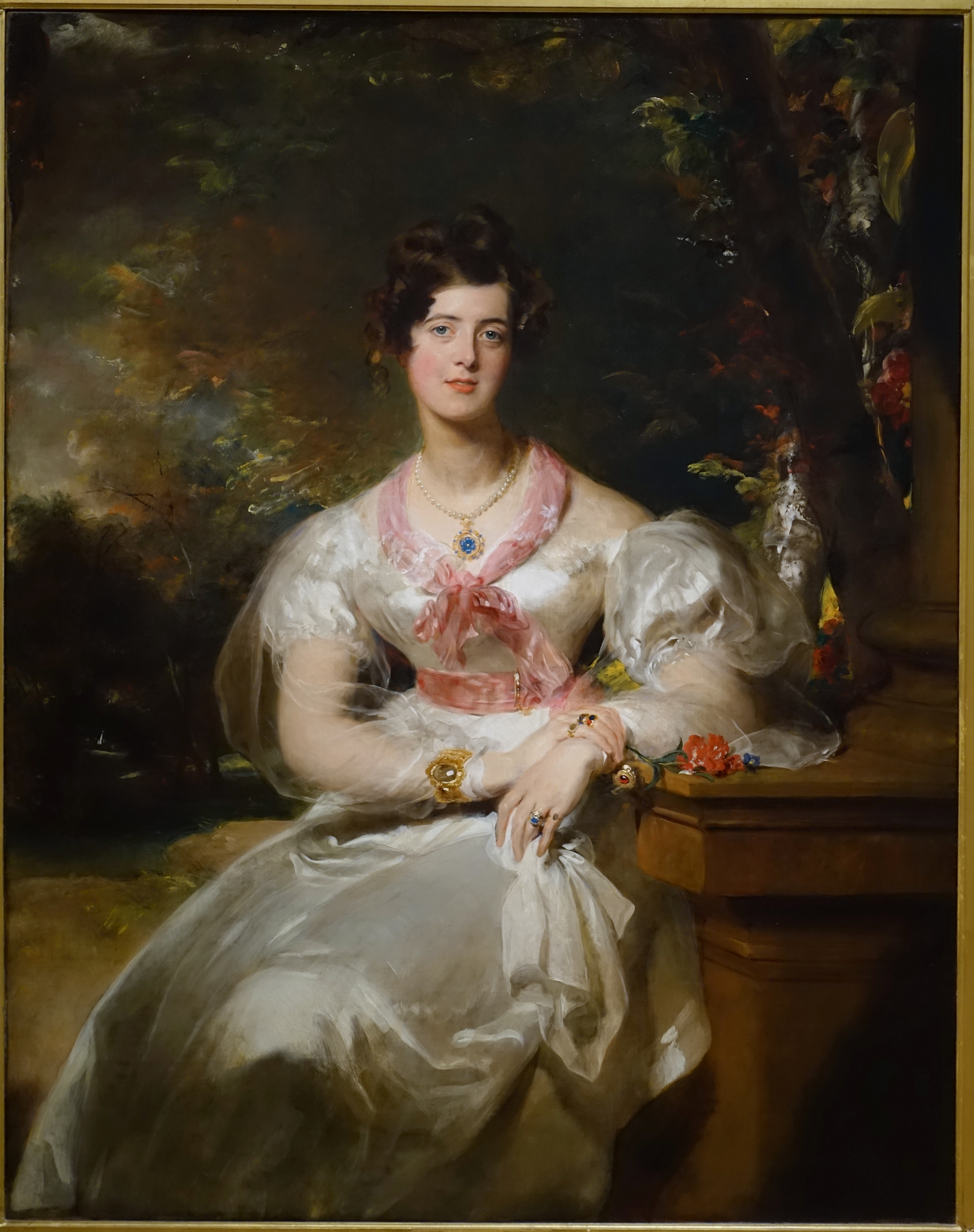
Portrait of Julia Hankey, Mrs. Seymour Bathurst, by Sir Thomas Lawrence, in the Dallas Museum of Art

Seymour Thomas Bathurst (27 October 1793 – 10 April 1834) was an English politician and soldier who served as the Member of Parliament (MP) for St Germans from 1818 to 1826.

== Early life and education ==
Seymour Thomas Bathurst was born in 1793 as the third son of Henry Bathurst, 3rd Earl Bathurst and Georgina Lennox, daughter of Lord George Lennox and a descendant of King Charles II. He was educated at Eton College from 1808 to 1811.

== Career ==
=== Military ===
Bathurst became an Ensign in 1814 in the Grenadier Guards, and Captain in 1821, before he became a Major in 1823 and then a Lieutenant Colonel in 1825. He was the inspecting field officer of militia, Ionian Isles from 1825 to 1828. He fought at the battle of Waterloo in 1815.

=== Political ===
Bathurst was elected to Parliament at the 1818 general election for the constituency of St Germans. He was reelected at the 1820 general election, before he retired at the 1826 general election.

== Personal life and death ==
Bathurst married Julia Hankey, the daughter of John Peter Hankey and niece of Chief Secretary Sir Frederick Hankey on 6 October 1829. They had two children, Allen and Mary. Neither of his elder brothers married, which meant his son Allen acceded to the Earldom in 1878.

Bathurst died on 10 April 1834.
