= Frederick Needham =

English physician (1835–1924)

Sir Frederick Needham (bapt. 8 November 1835 – 6 September 1924) was an English physician who was a Commissioner in Lunacy of the Board of Control for Lunacy and Mental Deficiency from 1892–1924.

Needham was born in York, the son of Dr. James Peacock Needham and Elizabeth Baker. He was educated at St Peter's School, York, St Bartholomew's Hospital, and the University of St Andrews (MD, 1862). He was appointed a Member of the Royal College of Surgeons of England, in 1858 and of the Royal College of Physicians of Edinburgh in 1865.

He was medical superintendent of the York Asylum (1858–74) and of Barnwood House Hospital in Gloucester (1874–92). He was also president of the Medico-Psychological Association of Great Britain in 1887 and was a member of the Royal Commission on the care and control of the feeble-minded. He also wrote a number of papers, including Brain Exhaustion and Insanity in relation to Society.

Needham was knighted in the 1915 Birthday Honours. He died in Bournemouth, aged 88. He was survived by his second wife, Helen Millicent Sherwood Newman, whom he married in 1913. His first wife, Charlotte Shooter, died 1907.
