= Alfred's Hall =

Derelict building in Gloucestershire, England

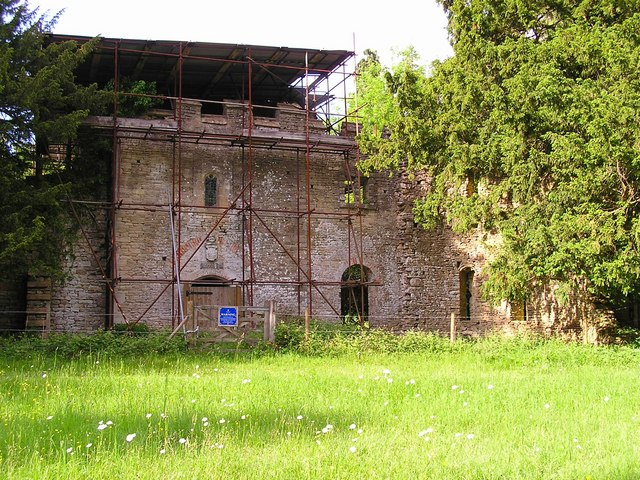
- The building with scaffolding in 2007

- Location within Gloucestershire
- 51.7266°N 2.0419°W

History
- Built: 1721

Listed Building – Grade II*
- Official name: Alfred's Hall at NGR SO 972 031
- Designated: 14 June 1948
- Reference no.: 1298719

Alfred's Hall is a ruined folly in Cirencester Park, Gloucestershire, England. The Grade II* listed building dates from 1721 and is "probably the first Gothick sham ruin to be built in England".

== History ==
The building was designed by the local member of parliament, Allen Bathurst, 1st Earl Bathurst and his friend, the poet Alexander Pope. The original 1721 structure was enlarged in 1732 and altered in the 19th century. This included the installation of sculpture, battlements, windows and doors from the manor house at Sapperton.

Vandalism in the early 20th century damaged the building. Only one room survives, the other having collapsed in 1989.

It is now on the Heritage at Risk Register maintained by Historic England. Its condition is described as "very bad", with an immediate risk of further rapid deterioration or loss of fabric". In 2019 a plan was drawn up for repair and stabilisation, however there was no evidence of work having started in 2021.

== Architecture ==
The battlemented two-storey limestone building has ashlar dressings. Parts of the two-bay front survive and are supported by buttresses. The surviving room inside is approximately 12.6 metres (41 ft) by 4.8 metres (16 ft) and has the remains of oak panelling.
