= Money.co.uk =

Price comparison website

money.co.uk
- Website type: Private
- Available in: English
- Owner: ZPG plc
- Industry: Finance and insurance
- Website: www.money.co.uk
- Launched: 2008; 18 years ago
- Current status: Active

money.co.uk is a UK-based price comparison website launched in 2008. It compares financial products including credit cards, bank savings, and mortgages. The company is regulated by the Financial Conduct Authority registered under its parent company, Dot Zinc Ltd.

== History ==
money.co.uk was launched under the parent company Dot Zinc Ltd, by founder and Managing Director Chris Morling, who featured 754th on Sunday Times Rich List 2015.

In the year to 31 October 2014, pre-tax profits were at £15.6 million and the site has received an average of over 2.5 million visits a month.

In 2014, the company underwent rebranding that involved a new logo, website and its first national TV advertising campaign, which featured competitive Los Angeles-based sign spinner Jeremy White.

In January 2017, a multimillion-pound campaign was launched with a TV advert showing scenarios where individuals checked different things, finishing with “you haven’t checked until you’ve checked money.co.uk”.

In September 2017, ZPG plc, which owns the property website firm Zoopla, purchased the company in a £140 million deal.

== Marketplace ==
money.co.uk compares financial products, with emphasis on things such as credit cards and bank savings rather than insurance like competitors. The site provides comparisons for around 60 products and generates revenue through commissions from the financial products it offers.

As part of the company's business proposal, Hannah Maundrell, the Editor-in-Chief of money.co.uk, has been featured in the national press advising consumers about their online purchasing rights and ways to manage credit and debt.

== Operations ==
The company has an auditing process in place for any payday loan providers who wish to be listed on money.co.uk. If a lender or broker refuse to complete the questionnaire consisting of 70 questions, they will not be listed on the website. In the year to 23 July 2014 there were 38 brokers, and lenders listed on the website. To aide customers in their financial comparison decision making, money.co.uk hosts finance-based guides.

The company previously had its head offices in the 150-year-old Cecily Hill Barracks, a former British Army barracks in Cirencester, Gloucestershire, known locally as ‘The Castle’. It also has a satellite office in London.

The main Cirencester offices are spread over three floors and include a staff gym, lounge and a games room that contains a foosball table that was formerly owned by Hollywood actor Robert Downey Jr. In 2020, the company undertook a £3 million renovation of ‘The Castle’ by Bath-based workplace design and build firm Interaction.
