= Joseph Mullings =

British politician

Member of Parliament for Cirencester
- In office 24 May 1848 – 30 April 1859 Serving with Allen Bathurst (1857–1859); Ashley Ponsonby (1852–1857); George Child Villiers (1848–1852)
- Preceded by: William Cripps; George Child Villiers
- Succeeded by: Ashley Ponsonby; Allen Bathurst

Personal details
- Born: 1792
- Died: 18 October 1859 (aged 67)
- Party: Conservative

Joseph Randolph Mullings (1792 – 18 October 1859) was a British Conservative politician.

Mullings was elected Conservative MP for Cirencester at a by-election in 1848—caused by the death of William Cripps—and held the seat until 1859 when he stepped down.

Parliament of the United Kingdom
Preceded by William Cripps; George Child Villiers	Member of Parliament for Cirencester; 1848–1859; With: Allen Bathurst (1857–1859); Ashley Ponsonby (1852–1857); George Child Villiers (1848–1852)	Succeeded by Ashley Ponsonby; Allen Bathurst
