= Kuldip Singh Dhillon =

Indian-British property developer (1950–2023)

Kuldip Singh Dhillon (31 July 1950 – 18 January 2023), often known by the anglicised first name "Kolin", was an Indian-British property developer and polo player and official. He was the chairman of Cirencester Park Polo Club.

== Biography ==
=== Early life and career ===
Dhillon was born in Punjab, India on 31 July 1950. He immigrated to Britain in 1955 when he was four years old. He lived initially in Warrington where his father owned a number of market stalls and it was in this town that he met his wife, Jacqueline, at a local disco. The couple started a family before moving to Gloucestershire, where they have since lived.

In the early 1970s, he became friends with the Parker-Bowles couple. Andrew Parker Bowles was a polo enthusiast; he and his wife Camilla would often dine at Dhillon's Gloucestershire home, or host the wealthy property developer at the couple's home in Wiltshire. In 1975, Dhillon joined Cirencester Park Polo Club, and, by his own statement, acquired the nickname of "Sooty" while playing against members of the Royal Family.

Dhillon also served as chairman of the Schools and Universities Polo Association and a director and player at Cirencester Park.

=== "Sooty" controversy ===
A board member and player at Cirencester Park Polo Club, at which Charles, Prince of Wales and his sons are members, Dhillon gained national attention in 2009 when it became known that his friend, the Prince of Wales, called him by the nickname "Sooty". Charles was subsequently labelled as "out of touch" for using the nickname. The story was first reported in The Telegraph's "Mandrake" column on 12 January 2009.

A spokesman for a group called "Give Racism the Red Card" stated, "Members of the Royal Family, with all the money that's been spent on their education, should be aware that calling people 'Sooty' is unacceptable. It comes at the same time as Prince Harry is again being hauled over the coals for using racist language."

Labour MP Keith Vaz, chairman of the Home Affairs Select Committee, reacted, "I do worry about the choice of these nicknames which they regard as terms of endearment and affection but which members of the public will regard as being offensive and distasteful."

Dhillon defended the Prince of Wales:

I have to say that you know you have arrived when you acquire a nickname. I enjoy being called Sooty by my friends who I am sure universally use the name as a term of affection with no offence meant or felt. The Prince of Wales is a man of zero prejudice and both his sons have always been most respectful.

=== Personal life and death ===
Dhillon had three daughters and one son, Satnam, in addition to helping his father run his property empire, is also a former player for the English national polo team. The firm's main offices are in Cheltenham.

Dhillon died on 18 January 2023, at the age of 72.
