= Allen Bathurst, 9th Earl Bathurst =

British peer, landowner and conservationist

The Right Honourable The Earl Bathurst
- Coat of Arms of Lord Bathurst.
- Predecessor: Henry Bathurst, 8th Earl Bathurst
- Born: Allen Christopher Bertram Bathurst; 11 March 1961 (age 65); Cirencester, Gloucestershire, England
- Spouses: Hilary George (m. 1986; div. 1994) Sara Chapman (m. 1996)
- Issue: Benjamin Bathurst, Lord Apsley; Lady Rosie Bathurst
- Parents: Henry Bathurst, 8th Earl Bathurst; Judith Mary Nelson

Allen Christopher Bertram Bathurst, 9th Earl Bathurst (born 11 March 1961), known as Lord Apsley until 2011, is a British peer, landowner and property developer.

== Life ==
The son of Henry Bathurst, 8th Earl Bathurst, and his wife Judith Mary Nelson, he was styled as Lord Apsley from birth.

He administers the 15,500 acres (6,300 ha) Bathurst estate in Gloucestershire and Wiltshire. It includes much of the villages of Sapperton and Coates, Pinbury Park, and the principal source of the River Thames. Within the estate is the Ivy Lodge polo ground, home of Cirencester Park Polo Club.

On 16 October 2011, he succeeded his father as Earl Bathurst (1772), Baron Bathurst of Battlesden (1712), and Lord Apsley (1771), all in the peerage of Great Britain.

In 2018 he was living with his wife Sara at Cirencester House, the family seat.

Lord Bathurst is active in the National Farmers Union and is the founding Director of the annual Cotswold Show, held every July on his estate. He is a past governor of the Royal Agricultural University, a director of the Gloucestershire Farming Trust, and a past President of the Three Counties Agricultural Society.

Lord Bathurst is President of the Cirencester Band, and patron of the Cirencester Male Voice Choir. He is Master of the St Lawrence Hospital charity, which owns almshouses in Cirencester, and Steward of the 300 year old Cirencester Society in London.

== Personal life ==
In 1986, as Lord Apsley, he married firstly Hilary Jane George, daughter of John F. George, of Weston Lodge, Albury, Guildford; they were divorced in 1994, having had two children, one son, Benjamin George Henry Bathurst, Lord Apsley (born 1990), the heir to the peerages, and one daughter. In February 1993, he was convicted of drink-driving.

On 5 June 1995, at Cirencester, he married secondly Sara, daughter of Christopher Chapman.

Peerage of Great Britain
Preceded by Henry Bathurst	Earl Bathurst; 2011–present	Incumbent; Heir apparent: Benjamin Bathurst, Lord Apsley
