= Ashley Ponsonby =

British politician

The Honourable Ashley Ponsonby DL, JP

Member of Parliament for Cirencester
- In office 1852–1857; 1859–1865

Personal details
- Born: 24 June 1831
- Died: 12 January 1898 (aged 66)
- Political party: Liberal
- Spouse: Louisa Gordon (m. 1857)
- Children: 3
- Parent: William Ponsonby (father)
- Relatives: Charles Ponsonby (brother); Frederick Ponsonby (grandfather); Anthony Ashley-Cooper (grandfather)

The Hon. Ashley George John Ponsonby, DL, JP (24 June 1831 – 12 January 1898), was a British Liberal politician.

== Background ==
Ponsonby was a younger son of William Ponsonby, 1st Baron de Mauley, third son of Frederick Ponsonby, 3rd Earl of Bessborough. His mother was Lady Barbara Ashley-Cooper, daughter of Anthony Ashley-Cooper, 5th Earl of Shaftesbury.

== Political and military career ==
Ponsonby sat as Member of Parliament for Cirencester between 1852 and 1857 and again between 1859 and 1865. He was also a captain in the Grenadier Guards and a Justice of the Peace and Deputy Lieutenant of Gloucestershire.

== Family ==
Ponsonby married Louisa Frances Charlotte Gordon, daughter of Lord Henry Gordon, in 1857. They had two sons and one daughter. He died in January 1898, aged 66. His wife died in February 1910.

He lived at Prince's Gardens in London and at Heatherfield in Ascot, Berkshire, now Heatherwood Hospital.

Parliament of the United Kingdom
Preceded by The Viscount Villiers; Joseph Mullings	Member of Parliament for Cirencester; 1852–1857; With: Joseph Mullings	Succeeded by Joseph Mullings; Allen Bathurst
Preceded by Joseph Mullings; Allen Bathurst	Member of Parliament for Cirencester; 1859–1865; With: Allen Bathurst	Succeeded by Allen Bathurst; Hon. Ralph Dutton
