= Sally Byng =

British speech and language therapist

Sally Byng FRCSLT OBE
- Occupation: Speech Therapist

Academic work
- Discipline: Aphasia
- Institutions: City, University of London; Barnwood Trust; Gloucestershire Wildlife Trust

Sally Byng FRCSLT OBE is a British speech and language therapist specialising in the treatment of aphasia, Chief executive of the Barnwood Trust, and Deputy lieutenant of Gloucestershire.

== Career ==
Byng was the Head of Division of Language and Communication Science at City, University of London from 1993–2002 and is named as one of the "City's Extraordinary Women". In 2018 she was named as one of the "50 Greatest Gloucestershire Women of all time" by Gloucestershire Live.

Byng was elected a Fellow of the Royal College of Speech and Language Therapists in 1991 and was awarded an OBE in 2005. She is a Deputy lieutenant of Gloucestershire and a Trustee of the Gloucestershire Wildlife Trust.

== Select publications ==
- Byng, S. and Black, M. 1989. Some aspects of sentence production in aphasia
- Byng, S. and Black, M. 1995. "What makes a therapy? Some parameters of therapeutic intervention in aphasia", International Journal of Language and Communication Disorders 30(3), 303–316.
- Byng, S. and Black, M. 1999. Reversible sentence comprehension test. Bicester: Winslow.
- Byng, S. and Duchan, J. F. 2004. Challenging aphasia therapies : broadening the discourse and extending the boundaries. Hove: Psychology Press.
- Byng, S., Duchan, J. F. and Pound, C. 2014. The aphasia therapy file. New York: Psychology Press.
