= Elizabeth Bathurst =

17th-century English Quaker writer

- Born: 1655
- Died: 1685 (aged 29–30)
- Notable work: Truth's Vindication (1679)
- Theological work
- Tradition or movement: Quakerism

Elizabeth Bathurst (1655–1685) was an English Quaker preacher and theologian, and the author of one of the few early systematic accounts of Quaker beliefs.

== Life ==
Bathurst was born in London, the eldest child of Charles Bathurst. She and her siblings became Quakers in 1678. Soon after her conversion to Quakerism, she interrupted worship at Samuel Annesley's Presbyterian chapel in London, speaking against the doctrine of reprobation. Later, she undertook several preaching tours, and was imprisoned at least once in the Marshalsea prison.

Bathurst was recognised during her lifetime by the Quaker community as a gifted preacher. George Whitehead, who discussed her major work with her before its publication, commented on her "excellent gift, both of understanding, life and utterance". She has been described by historian Sarah Apetrei as "by far the most theologically sophisticated" of the numerous women leaders among early Quakers.

According to her father's account of her life, Bathurst suffered "great weakness of body" from infancy.

== Writings ==
Bathurst's major work was Truth's Vindication: Or, A Gentle Stroke to Wipe Off The Foul Aspersions, False Accusations and Misrepresentations, Cast Upon the People of God, call'd Quakers (first published 1679). It explains and defends the distinctive Quaker account of salvation, focusing in particular on the universal offer of salvation and the infallible guidance of the Holy Spirit. Truth's Vindication was reprinted six times by Quaker publishers - notably in a posthumous (1691) edition by Tace Sowle, as her first project after she took over her father's publishing firm.

She also wrote The Sayings of Women... in several places of the Scriptures, presenting a theological defence of women's authority to preach and teach.
