= Henry Bathurst, 8th Earl Bathurst =

British peer, soldier and Conservative politician

Henry Allen John Bathurst, 8th Earl Bathurst
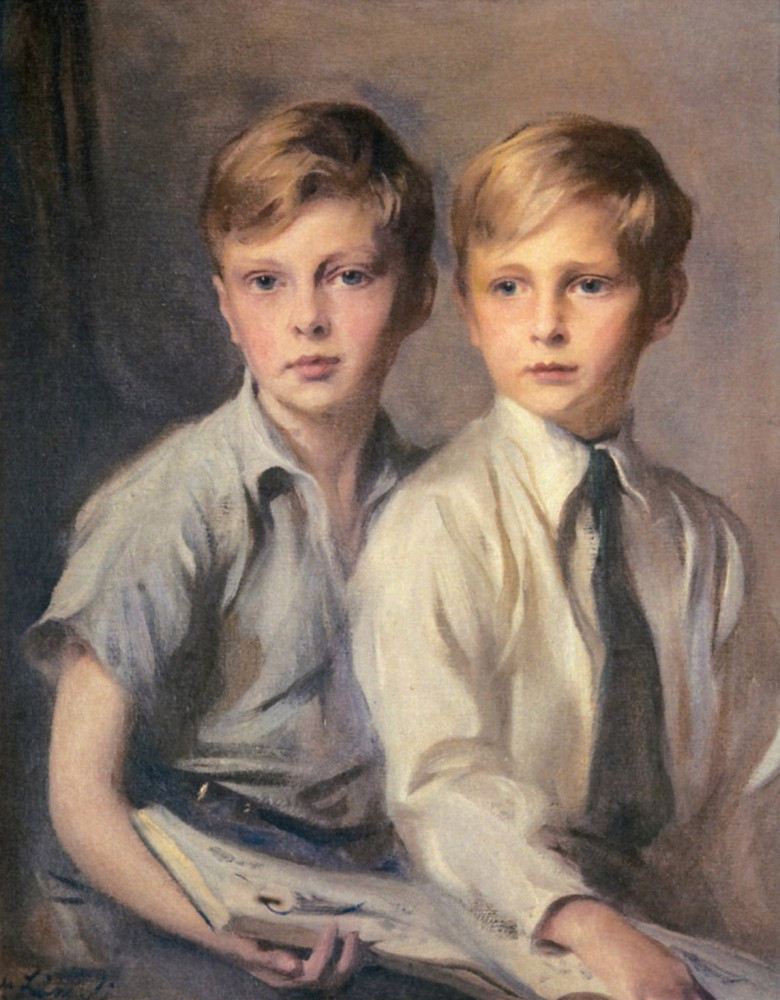
- Portrait of Bathurst and his younger brother, George, by Philip de László, 1936
- Born: 1 May 1927
- Died: 16 October 2011 (aged 84)
- Occupations: British peer, soldier and Conservative politician

Henry Allen John Bathurst, 8th Earl Bathurst DL (1 May 1927 – 16 October 2011), styled Lord Apsley from 1942 to 1943, was a British peer, soldier and Conservative politician. He was most recently known for an altercation with Prince William.

== Background and education ==
The eldest son of Allen Bathurst, Lord Apsley, and his wife Violet (née Meeking), he was educated at Eton College, Ridley College, St. Catharines, Ontario, Canada, and Christ Church, Oxford.

== Military and political career ==
His father having been killed in 1942 while on active duty during World War II, Bathurst succeeded to the family titles on the death of his grandfather, the 7th Earl Bathurst, in 1943. He joined the military in 1948, when he was appointed a Governor of the Royal Agricultural College. Lord Bathurst was commissioned, served in the 10th Royal Hussars and later the Royal Gloucestershire Hussars, and promoted Captain in the Territorials to the local cavalry regiment, the Royal Gloucestershire Hussars. While working on his estate he was made Joint MFH of the Vale of White Horse hunt. He later held political office under Harold Macmillan as a Lord-in-Waiting (government whip in the House of Lords) from 1957 to 1961. The Conservative government recommended him as a Deputy Lieutenant of the county in 1960. Briefly, he was promoted a junior minister as Joint Under-Secretary of State for the Home Department from 1961 to 1962. He was a Deputy Lieutenant for Gloucestershire from 1960 to 1986, following which he left politics to run the family estate based around Cirencester Park.

According to the 2003 Sunday Times Rich List, he was tied at position #904 with a number of others. On retiring he took up residence at Manor Farm, Sapperton near Cirencester. Lord Bathurst married Judith Mary, daughter of Viscount Nelson and had issue of two sons and a daughter.

== Publicity ==
Bathurst was rather notoriously involved in an altercation with Prince William in the summer of 2003. According to the noted sources, the altercation occurred on Lord Bathurst's property at Cirencester Park, Gloucestershire. He was driving a Land Rover Defender, when Prince William, after playing polo at the club, overtook Lord Bathurst in a Volkswagen Golf car. Lord Bathurst, unaware of the driver's identity, was infuriated by what he saw as a reckless disregard for the driving rules that guide cooperation between his estate and the polo club. In his attempt to keep up with the Prince, Lord Bathurst engaged in off-road manoeuvres, finally being stopped by the Prince's security team. As Lord Bathurst told the BBC, "There are rules in the polo club about driving on the [Bathurst family] estate, and people have to stick to them." No harm was done, as there were no resulting injuries and Clarence House issued a formal apology to Lord Bathurst.

== Marriages and children ==
The 8th earl was married on 20 March to Judith Mary (1931–2001), daughter of Sir Amos Christopher Nelson, by whom the Earl had issue. They were divorced in 1976:

- Allen Bathurst, 9th Earl Bathurst (born 11 March 1961) he married Hilary George in 1986 and they were divorced in 1994. They have two children. He married secondly Sara L. Chapman on 5 June 1996.
- Lady Henrietta Mary Lilias Bathurst (born 17 October 1962) she married Neil S. Palmer in 2000. They have two children:
  - Judith Kathleen Lilias Palmer (14 September 2001)
  - Alexander Henry Oliver Palmer (14 February 2004)
- The Honorable Alexander Edward Seymour Bathurst (born 8 August 1965) he married Emma Gae Sharpe in 1992. They have one son:
  - Harry John Seymour Bathurst (3 July 1996)

After his divorce, Lord Bathurst married a second time on 17 January 1978, to Gloria Rutherston, née Clary. She died in 2018; and left the bulk of her fortune to a pair of interior designers.

Political offices
Preceded by David Renton	Joint Under-Secretary of State for the Home Department with David Renton 1961; Charles Fletcher-Cooke 1961–1962; 1961–1962	Succeeded by Charles Fletcher-Cooke; Montague Woodhouse
Peerage of Great Britain
Preceded by Henry Bathurst	Earl Bathurst; 1943–2011	Succeeded by Allen Bathurst
