= Lothar Kalinowsky =

American psychiatrist

Lothar Kalinowsky (December 28, 1899, in Berlin – June 28, 1992, in New York) was an American psychiatrist best known for advocating electroconvulsive therapy.

He contributed to the second edition of the Diagnostic and Statistical Manual of Mental Disorders.
