= Howard Ford (businessman) =

Howard Ford was born in 1950. He gained a degree in chemical engineering from Christ's College, Cambridge.

First working in sales and marketing positions for IBM UK, Ford became managing director of Cellnet, a mobile phone operator owned by BT and Securicor. It became O2 (United Kingdom).

After, Ford became managing director of Equant Network Services and the company was listed on the New York Stock Exchange and the Paris Bourse before its acquisition by France Telecom in 2005.

== Currently ==
Currently Ford holds a number of Chairmanships including at Light Blue Optics, Filtronic plc, Cambridge Semiconductor Limited and ZBD Solutions Ltd. Previously, he served as the chairman of Thames Valley Training and Enterprise Council, the Branshaw Foundation and the French company Varioptic SA.

He lives in Camberley and is married with two sons. In his spare time he plays golf, tennis and bass guitar in an aging rock band.
