= Allen Bathurst, 6th Earl Bathurst =

British peer and Conservative Member of Parliament

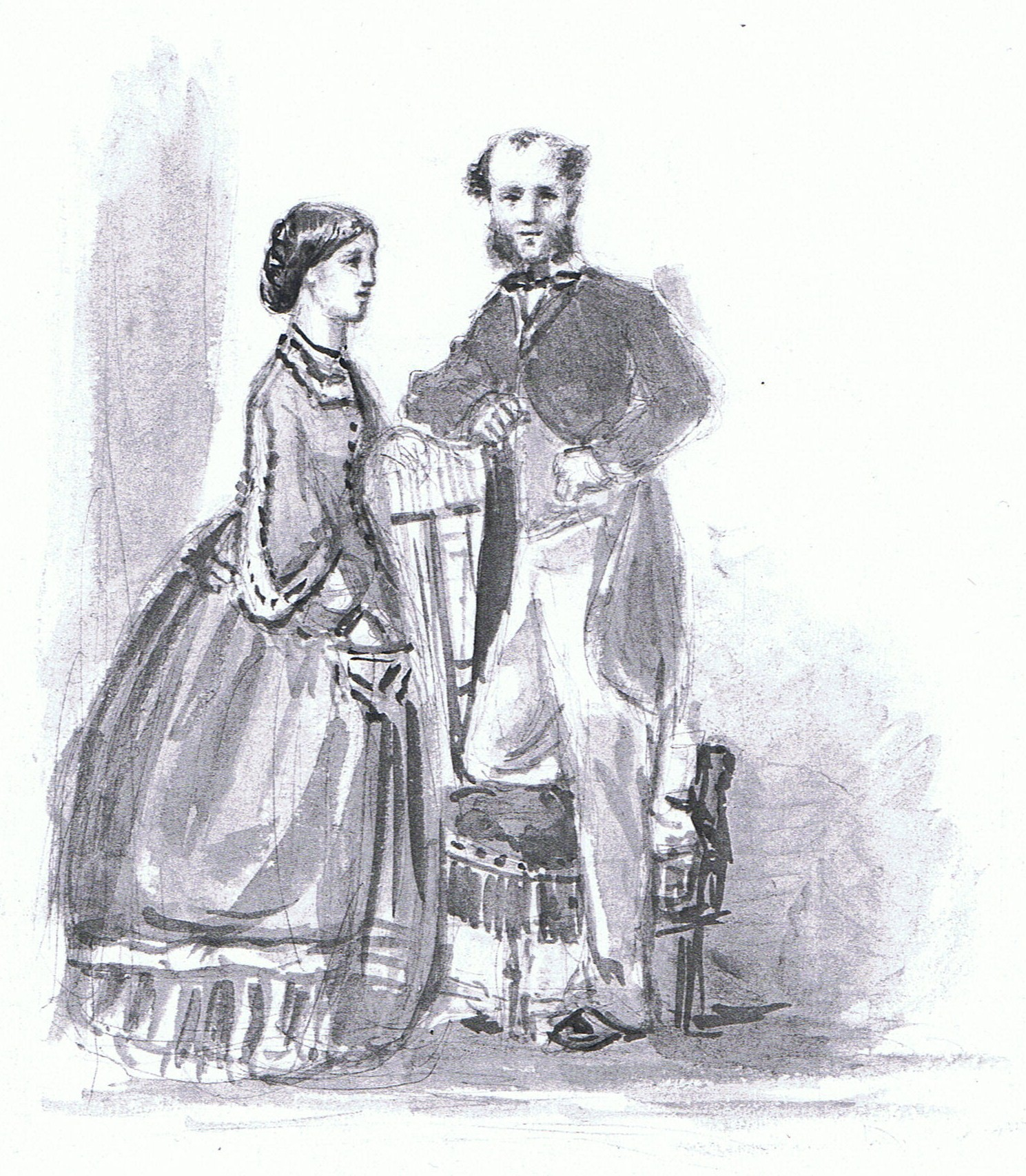
Lord Bathurst and his first wife, Meriel (1839–1872).

Allen Alexander Bathurst, 6th Earl Bathurst (19 October 1832 – 1 August 1892), known as Allen Bathurst until 1878, was a British peer and Conservative Member of Parliament.

== Background and education ==
Bathurst was the son of Lieutenant-Colonel the Hon. Seymour Thomas Bathurst, third son of Henry Bathurst, 3rd Earl Bathurst. His mother was Julia, daughter of John Peter Hankey. His father, a veteran of the Battle of Waterloo, died when Bathurst was one year old. He was educated at Eton and Trinity College, Cambridge; in 1853 he received an MA.

== Military career ==
Bathurst was an officer in the auxiliary forces for many years. He was commissioned as an ensign in the Royal South Gloucestershire Light Infantry Militia on 16 May 1851 and was promoted to lieutenant on 4 May 1853. and then to captain in the Royal North Gloucestershire Militia on 10 November 1854. During the invasion scare of 1859–60 he raised the 9th (Cirencester) Gloucestershire Rifle Volunteer Corps on 13 February 1860 with the rank of captain, beginning a long family association with what became the 5th Battalion, Gloucestershire Regiment. He retained his commission in the militia and was promoted to major on 22 March 1870 and to the honorary rank of lieutenant-colonel on 3 May 1876. He retired from the militia on 23 March 1878.

== Political career ==
In 1857 he was elected to the House of Commons as one of two representatives for Cirencester, a seat he held until 1878, when he succeeded his uncle in the earldom and entered the House of Lords. In 1861 he bought a house in Chobham as well as being resident in London.

== Family ==
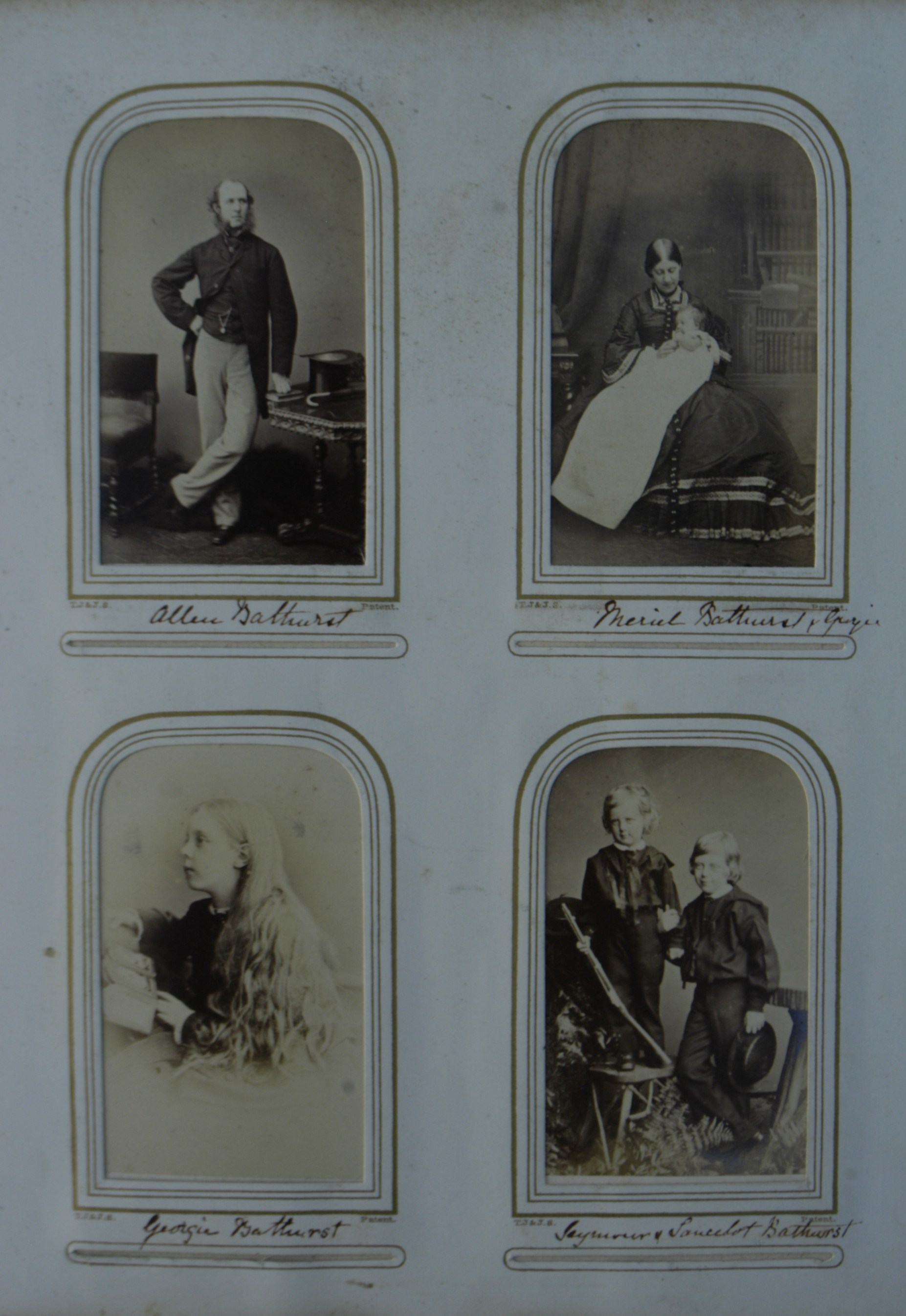
Bathurst's wife and children, circa 1870 and 1880.

Mr Allen Bathurst, as he was until 1878, married on 31 Jan 1862, in the Tabley Chapel, Great Budworth, the Hon. Meriel Warren (1839 – 1872), daughter of George Warren, 2nd Baron de Tabley, by his first wife Catharina Barbara, daughter of Count de Salis. They had three sons and one daughter.

- Lady Georgina Bathurst (1863-1922) married Sir George Buchanan, and had issue (namely Meriel Buchanan).
- Seymour Bathurst, 7th Earl Bathurst (1864-1943)
- Hon. Lancelot Bathurst (1868-1928)
- Lt.-Col. The Hon. Allen "Benjamin" Bathurst (1872-1947)

They lived in St George's Hanover Square. After her death in 1872, (11 days after the birth of their son Benjamin), he remarried in 1874 Evelyn Elizabeth Hankey, daughter of George James Barnard Hankey. They had one daughter:

- Lady Evelyn Selina Bathurst (1875-1946) married 1898 Major George Coryton Lister, KRRC, and had children.

Lord Bathurst died in August 1892, aged 59, and was succeeded in the earldom by his eldest son Seymour. His third son Benjamin also became Member of Parliament for Cirencester and was the grandfather of the naval commander Admiral of the Fleet Sir Benjamin Bathurst. Lady Bathurst survived her husband by over thirty years and died in 1927.

== Notes ==
Parliament of the United Kingdom
Preceded by Joseph Randolph Mullings; Ashley Ponsonby	Member of Parliament for Cirencester; 1857 – 1878; With: Joseph Randolph Mullings 1857–1859; Ashley Ponsonby 1859–1865; Ralph Dutton 1865–1868	Succeeded by Thomas Chester-Master
Peerage of Great Britain
Preceded by William Lennox Bathurst	Earl Bathurst; 1878–1892	Succeeded by Seymour Henry Bathurst
