= Seymour Bathurst, 7th Earl Bathurst =

British nobleman, soldier and newspaper owner

The Right Honourable The Earl Bathurst
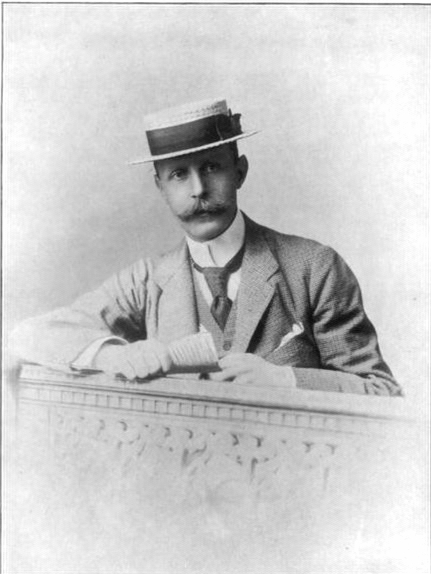
- Seymour Henry Bathurst c. 1902
- Reign: 1892–1943
- Predecessor: Allen Bathurst
- Successor: Henry Bathurst
- Born: 21 July 1864
- Died: 21 September 1943 (aged 79)
- Noble family: Bathurst
- Spouse: Lilias Margaret Frances Borthwick
- Issue: 4, including Allen
- Father: Allen Bathurst, 6th Earl Bathurst
- Mother: Meriel Leicester Warren
- Occupation: Soldier and newspaper owner

Seymour Henry Bathurst, 7th Earl Bathurst, CMG, TD, JP, DL (21 July 1864 – 21 September 1943) was a British nobleman, soldier and newspaper owner.

== Background and education ==
Bathurst was the son of Allen Bathurst, 6th Earl Bathurst and Meriel Leicester Warren. His maternal grandparents were George Warren, 2nd Baron de Tabley and his wife Catharina Barbara de Salis-Saglio. He was educated at Eton and Christ Church, Oxford.

== Military career ==
Bathurst followed his father into the part-time 4th Battalion (Royal North Gloucestershire Militia), Gloucestershire Regiment, and was promoted to command the battalion with the rank of lieutenant-colonel on 2 March 1898. His younger brother Allen "Benjamin" Bathurst also served in the regiment. The 4th Gloucesters were embodied for full-time service from 11 January 1900 to 27 July 1901 during the Second Boer War, serving on the island of St Helena guarding Boer prisoners. In recognition of his services, Bathurst was appointed a Companion of the Order of St Michael and St George (CMG) in the South African Honours list published on 26 June 1902.

Earl Bathurst retired from the 4th Gloucesters on 2 March 1908, just before it was disbanded, but on 22 September that year he was appointed Honorary Colonel of the 5th Gloucesters, a battalion in the new Territorial Force, to which his brother Benjamin had just been appointed as commanding officer. He retained the position until 1933. He was also president of the Gloucestershire Territorial Association and was awarded the Territorial Decoration (TD).

== Marriage and family ==
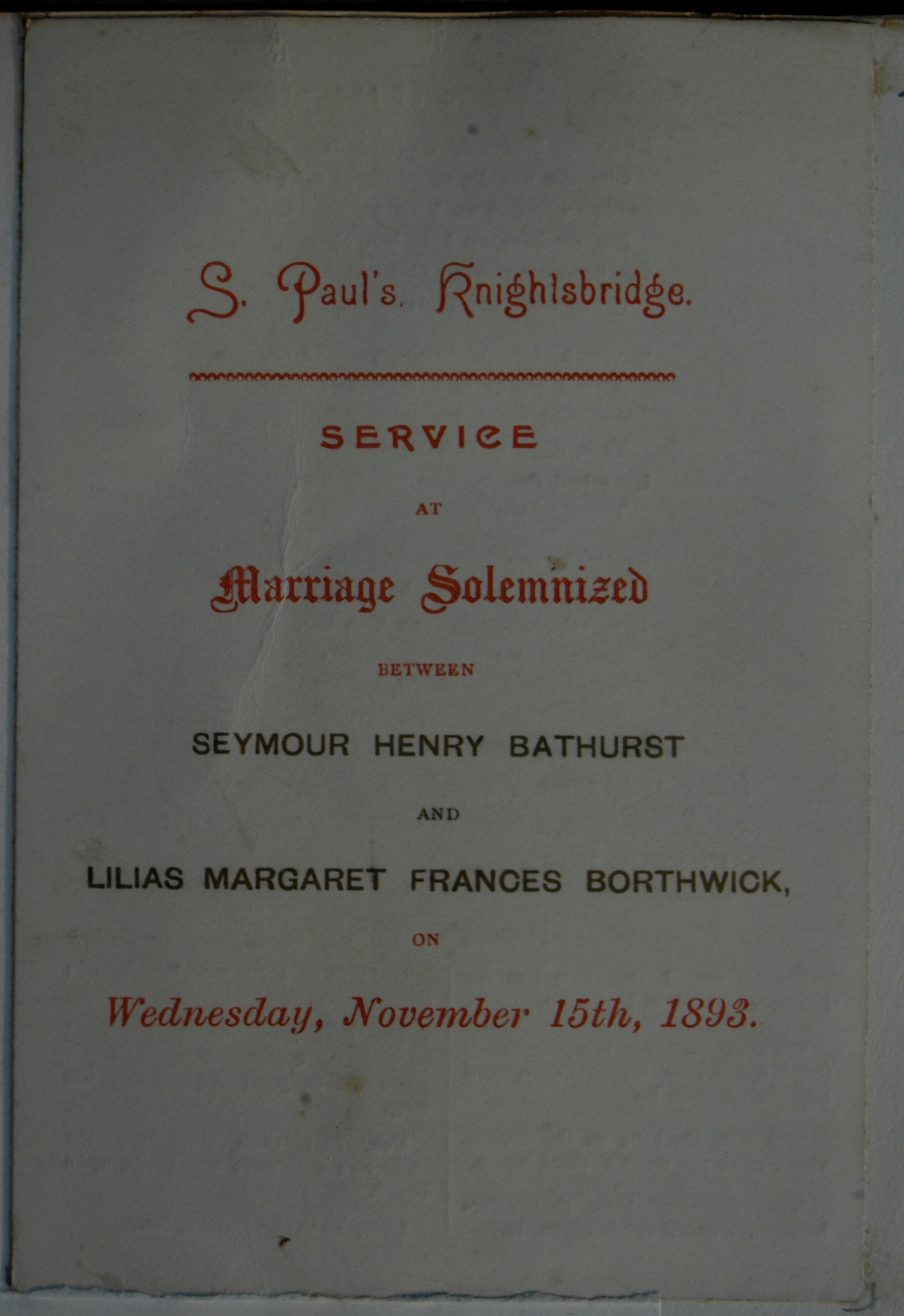
Marriage Solemization service for S.H. Bathurst and L.M.F. Borthwick 15 November 1893, Knightsbridge.

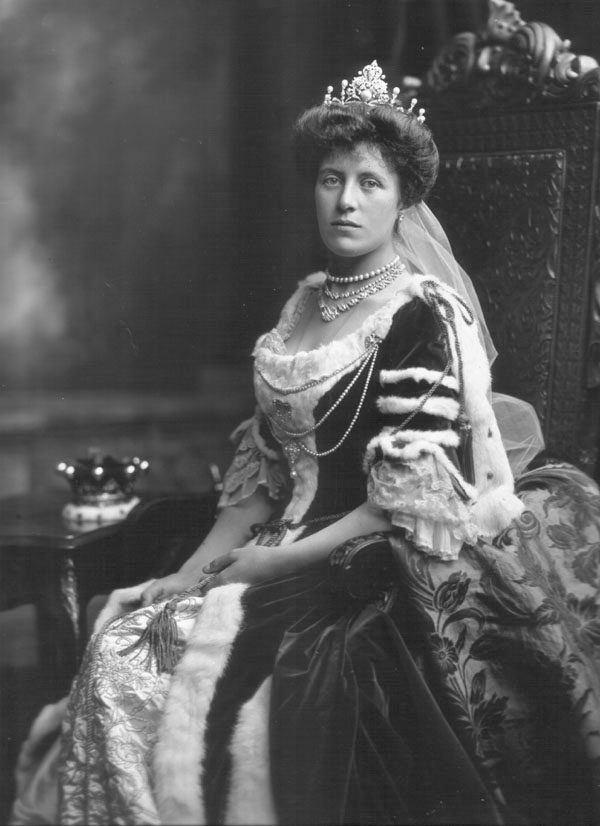
Countess of Bathurst, photographed 24 September 1902.

On 15 November 1893, Bathurst married the Honourable Lilias Margaret Frances Borthwick, only daughter of Algernon Borthwick, 1st Baron Glenesk, owner of The Morning Post and his wife Alice Beatrice Lister, daughter of the novelist Thomas Henry Lister, and his wife Maria. They had four children:

- Lady Meriel Olivia Bathurst (3 September 1894 – 18 January 1936). She married Captain Lord Alastair Mungo Graham, son of Douglas Graham, 5th Duke of Montrose.
- Lt-Col Allen Bathurst, Lord Apsley (3 August 1895 – killed on active service 17 December 1942) m. Violet Meeking of Richings Park. Their elder son Henry became the 8th Earl Bathurst.
- Hon. William Ralph Seymour Bathurst (21 September 1903 – 10 September 1970). He married Helen Winifred Heathcoat-Amory, daughter of Lt-Col Harry William Ludovic Heathcote Heathcoat-Amory, of the Heathcoat-Amory baronets.
- Hon. Ralph Henry Bathurst (26 September 1904 – 5 December 1965).

Countess Lilias Road in Cirencester is named after Lady Bathurst.

== Morning Post ==
At the time of their marriage, it was expected that the Morning Post would be inherited by Oliver Borthwick, a younger brother of his wife. However Oliver predeceased his father on 23 March 1905, and Bathurst's wife Lilias became the only legal heir of her father. Lord Glenesk died on 24 November 1908. His estate was inherited by his only surviving child. The Morning Post was then co-owned by Bathurst and his wife. It was under their ownership, in 1920, that the paper published a series of articles based on the so-called Protocols of the Elders of Zion. These were collected the same year and published in London and New York in book form under the title of The Cause of World Unrest. The Bathursts sold the paper to a consortium organized by the 8th Duke of Northumberland in 1924.

== See also ==
- Bathurst (surname)

Peerage of Great Britain
Preceded by Allen Bathurst	Earl Bathurst; 1892–1943	Succeeded by Henry Bathurst
