= Benjamin Bathurst (politician, born 1872) =

British politician

Bathurst in 1895.

Lieutenant-Colonel Hon. Allen Benjamin Bathurst (25 June 1872 – 8 October 1947) was a British Conservative Party politician.

Bathurst was the third son of Allen Bathurst, 6th Earl Bathurst, and his first wife the Hon. Meriel née Warren (1839–1872), daughter of George Warren, 2nd Baron de Tabley. He served under his elder brother Seymour Bathurst, 7th Earl Bathurst, in the 4th Battalion (Royal North Gloucestershire Militia), Gloucestershire Regiment and later commanded the 5th Battalion, Gloucestershire Regiment, retiring with the rank of Lieutenant-Colonel in the Territorial Force Reserve. At the 1895 general election he was elected to the House of Commons as Member of Parliament (MP) for Cirencester, a seat he held until his defeat in 1906. He regained the seat at the January 1910 election and held it until the constituency was abolished at the 1918 general election. He was appointed a deputy lieutenant of Gloucestershire on 24 December 1913.

Bathurst married at St Peter's Church, Eaton Square, on 22 April 1902, Augusta Ruby Spencer-Churchill, daughter of Lord Edward Spencer-Churchill, and granddaughter of the 6th Duke of Marlborough. They had a son, Peter Bathurst (1903–1970).

He died in October 1947, aged 75. His grandson and namesake is the prominent naval commander Sir Benjamin Bathurst.

== Footnotes ==
Parliament of the United Kingdom
Preceded by Harry Lawson Webster Levy-Lawson	Member of Parliament for Cirencester; 1895 – 1906	Succeeded by Walter Essex
Preceded by Walter Essex	Member of Parliament for Cirencester; Jan 1910 – 1918	Constituency abolished
