= Earl Bathurst =

Earldom in the Peerage of Great Britain

Earldom of Bathurst
- Sable, two bars ermine, in chief three crosses pattée or.
- Creation date: August 1772
- Created by: George III
- Peerage: Peerage of Great Britain
- First holder: Allen Bathurst, 1st Earl
- Present holder: Allen Bathurst, 9th Earl
- Heir apparent: Benjamin Bathurst, Lord Apsley
- Remainder to: the 1st Earl's heirs male of the body lawfully begotten
- Subsidiary titles: Baron Bathurst; Baron Apsley
- Seat: Cirencester House
- Motto: Tien Ta Foy ("Keep thy faith")

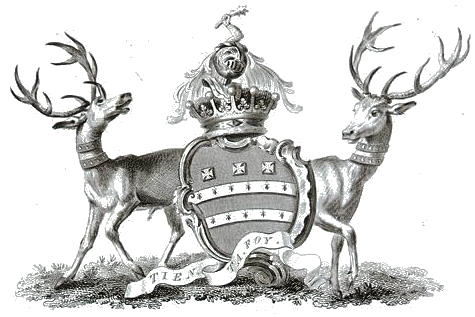
Coat of arms of the Earls Bathurst, from: the English Peerage, Charles Catton, 1790

Earl Bathurst, of Bathurst in the County of Sussex, is a title in the Peerage of Great Britain.

The medieval English word was Botehurst, thought to date at least from the 13th century. Bote is the origination of Battle, although the family may have settled there post-dating the Conquest. This translated as 'a wood in a wood' which may in contradistinction have meant a clearing. The name of Apsley adopted by the family derived from Thakenham, near Pulborough in east Sussex, which may have referred to apse - lea or a 'church in a meadow'. The Bathurst estates were at Cirencester Park and Paulerspury, Northamptonshire, which Bathursts inherited before the park was laid out in the Cotswolds.

== History ==
The title Earl Bathurst was created in 1772 for Allen Bathurst, 1st Baron Bathurst, a politician and an opponent of Sir Robert Walpole. Bathurst was known for his wit and learning, for his connections with poets and scholars of his time, and for the famous landscape garden he created at his seat, Cirencester House, in Gloucestershire. He was the son of Sir Benjamin Bathurst, Cofferer of the Household and Governor of the British East India Company, by his wife Frances, daughter of Sir Allen Apsley. He had previously been elevated to the Peerage of Great Britain sixty years before in 1712 as Baron Bathurst, of Battlesden in the County of Bedford. He married his cousin Catherine Apsley, daughter of his maternal uncle Sir Peter Apsley, in 1704.

He was succeeded by his second but eldest surviving son, the second Earl. He was a prominent lawyer and politician. In 1771, four years before the death of his father, he was raised to the Peerage of Great Britain in his own right as Baron Apsley, in the County of Sussex. He then served as Lord High Chancellor of Great Britain until 1778 and later held office as Lord President of the Council. Bathurst constructed Apsley House in London, which later became the seat of the Dukes of Wellington. His eldest son Henry, the third Earl, was a noted politician. He served as President of the Board of Trade, as Foreign Secretary, as Secretary of State for War and the Colonies and as Lord President of the Council. He gave his name to Bathurst, the capital of The Gambia, now called Banjul; to the Australian town of Bathurst, the first inland city in the country; and to Bathurst Street, a major street in Toronto in Canada. There is also the city of Bathurst, a city in the province of New Brunswick in Canada.

His eldest son, the fourth Earl, represented Weobley and Cirencester in the House of Commons as a Tory. He never married and was succeeded by his younger brother, the fifth Earl. He sat as Member of Parliament for Weobly. He also died unmarried and was succeeded by his nephew, the sixth Earl. He was the son of Lieutenant-Colonel the Hon. Thomas Seymour Bathurst, third and youngest son of the third Earl. Lord Bathurst represented Cirencester in Parliament as a Conservative.

On his death, the titles passed to his eldest son, the seventh Earl. He was for some years the owner of the Morning Post. Lord Bathurst's eldest son and heir apparent Allen Bathurst, Lord Apsley, was Member of Parliament for Southampton and Bristol Central. In 1942 he was killed in the Second World War, predeceasing his father by one year. His wife Viola Bathurst, Lady Apsley, succeeded him as Member of Parliament for Bristol Central. Lord Bathurst was succeeded by his grandson, the eighth Earl, who held political office under Harold Macmillan as a Lord-in-waiting (government whip in the House of Lords) from 1957 to 1961 and as Joint Under-Secretary of State for the Home Department from 1961 to 1962. As of 2014 the titles are held by his son, the ninth Earl, who succeeded in 2011.

Several other members of the family have also gained distinction. Admiral of the Fleet Sir Benjamin Bathurst, First Sea Lord between 1993 and 1995, is the grandson of the Honourable Benjamin Bathurst, Member of Parliament for Cirencester, third son of the sixth Earl. Benjamin Bathurst, younger son of the second Earl, was a diplomat best known for his sudden disappearance in 1809. The politician Charles Bathurst (who was born Charles Bragge and assumed the surname of Bathurst in 1804), was the son of Anne Bathurst, granddaughter of Sir Benjamin Bathurst, younger brother of the first Earl Bathurst. He was the great-grandfather of Charles Bathurst, 1st Viscount Bledisloe.

The family seat is Cirencester House, near Cirencester, Gloucestershire.

== Baron Bathurst (1712–present) ==
- Allen Bathurst, 1st Baron Bathurst (1684–1775) (created Earl Bathurst in 1772)

== Earls Bathurst (1772–present) ==
- Allen Bathurst, 1st Earl Bathurst (1684–1775)
- Henry Bathurst, 2nd Earl Bathurst (1714–1794) (earlier created Baron Apsley in 1771)
- Henry Bathurst, 3rd Earl Bathurst (1762–1834)
- Henry George Bathurst, 4th Earl Bathurst (1790–1866)
- William Lennox Bathurst, 5th Earl Bathurst (1791–1878)
- Allen Alexander Bathurst, 6th Earl Bathurst (1832–1892)
- Seymour Henry Bathurst, 7th Earl Bathurst (1864–1943)
- Henry Allen John Bathurst, 8th Earl Bathurst (1927–2011)
- Allen Christopher Bertram Bathurst, 9th Earl Bathurst (b. 1961)

The heir apparent is the present holder's earl's son Benjamin George Henry Bathurst, Lord Apsley (b. 1990)
The heir apparent’s heir apparent is his son, Hon. Theodore George Eugene Bathurst (b. 2023)

== See also ==
- Viscount Bledisloe
- Earl Bathurst (locomotive)
- Bathurst Street (Toronto)
