= Cirencester Park (country house) =

Country house in Gloucestershire, England

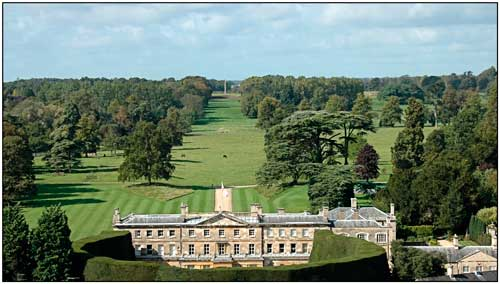
- Cirencester Park

- Location in Gloucestershire
- 51°43′01″N 01°58′20″W
- Location: Cirencester, Gloucestershire, England

Cirencester Park is a country house in the parish of Cirencester in Gloucestershire, England, and is the seat of the Bathurst family, Earls Bathurst. It is a Grade II* listed building. The gardens are Grade I listed on the Register of Historic Parks and Gardens.

== History ==
Allen Bathurst, 1st Earl Bathurst (1684–1775), inherited the estate on the death of his father, Sir Benjamin Bathurst, in 1704. He was a Tory Member of Parliament and statesman who made his wealth from his involvement in the slave trade through the Royal Africa Company and the East India Company. From 1714 Benjamin Bathurst devoted himself to rebuilding the house formerly known as Oakley Grove, which probably stands on the site of Cirencester Castle, and laying out the parkland of what would become Oakley Park.

In 1716, Bathurst acquired the extensive estate of Sapperton from the Atkyns family, including Oakley Wood, and went on to plant one of the finest landscape gardens in England, complete with park buildings, walks, seats, grottoes and ruins. They include Alfred's Hall, now taken to be the earliest recorded Gothick garden building in England, which is also a grade II* listed building.

Allen Bathurst was raised to the peerage as a baron in 1711 and an earl in 1772, and was a patron of art and literature no less than a statesman. The poet Alexander Pope was a frequent visitor to Cirencester House; he advised on the lay-out of the gardens and designed the building known as Pope's Seat in the park, which commands a splendid view of woods and avenues. Jonathan Swift was another appreciative visitor.

The house contains portraits by Lawrence, Gainsborough, Romney, Lely, Reynolds, Hoppner, Kneller and many others, and a set of giant marble columns carrying busts, which are genuine antiques, collected in Italy by Lord Apsley, the son of the third earl, at the time of the Congress of Vienna in 1814.

There were additions to the house by Sir Robert Smirke about 1830.

Subsequent earls were patrons of the Arts and Crafts movement, when Ernest Gimson and the Barnsley brothers, Sidney and Ernest, settled at Pinbury Park on the Cirencester estate in 1894. Norman Jewson joined them in 1907, and describes his life as a student of Gimson in Sapperton in his classic memoir, By Chance I did Rove (1952).

The estate includes much of the villages of Sapperton and Coates, including Pinbury Park, and lays claim to containing the principal source of the River Thames.

Apsley House, at Hyde Park in London, was built by the architect Robert Adam for Lord Chancellor Henry Bathurst, then known as Lord Apsley, and later the second Earl Bathurst. In 1807, the house was purchased by Richard Wellesley, 1st Marquess Wellesley, who in 1817 sold it to his brother, Arthur Wellesley, 1st Duke of Wellington who presented his portrait, today still in Cirencester House.

The house has the tallest yew hedge in Britain.

In 2024 it was announced that a charge was to be levied for the first time for public access to the Cirencester Park estate. A right to roam protest is planned to target the estate. Electronic gates and a ticket booth is to be established to regulate access to the park.

== Listed buildings and structures ==
Aside from the Grade I listed gardens and Grade II* listed main house, several other buildings and structures are listed on the National Heritage List for England.

=== Grade II* ===
- Alfred's Hall
- Hexagon
- Ice House
- Pope's Seat
- Queen Anne's Monument

=== Grade II ===
- Horse Temple
- Ivy Lodge and attached farm buildings and wall
- Four stone piers
- Round Tower and attached wall
- Shelter Shed
- Square Tower
- Stable range and attached mounting block
- The two Horse Guard pavilions

== See also ==
- Earl Bathurst
- Cirencester
- Sapperton, Gloucestershire
- Landscape architecture
