= Henry Poole (died 1632) =

English landowner and politician

Sir Henry Poole (1564 – 3 November 1632) was an English landowner and politician who sat in the House of Commons at various times between 1597 and 1626.

Poole was the eldest son of Edward Poole of Cirencester, Gloucestershire and Oaksey, Wiltshire. He succeeded to the estates on the death of his father in 1577. In 1580, he attended Trinity College, Oxford. He was a J.P. for Wiltshire from about 1590 but fell into dispute with fellow JP Henry Knyvet over the ownership of the manor of Kemble, a quarrel which lasted several years.

In 1597, Poole was elected Member of Parliament for Cirencester. He was knighted in 1603. In 1604 he was elected MP for Cricklade. He was elected MP for Wiltshire in 1614 and was High Sheriff of Wiltshire from 1619 to 1620. In 1621 he was elected MP for Malmesbury. He was elected MP for Oxfordshire in 1624, becoming one of the few MPs to serve as Knight of the Shire for more than one county. In 1626 he was elected MP for Wiltshire again.

Poole died at the age of 67.

Poole married firstly Griselda Neville, daughter of Edward Nevill, 7th Baron Bergavenny, of Newton St Loe, Somerset and had two sons and a daughter. He married secondly Anne Lady Harington (née Barnard) widow of Sir James Harington of Ridlington, Rutland. His son Neville was also a Member of Parliament.

Parliament of England
Preceded by Oliver St John; Henry Ferrers	Member of Parliament for Cirencester; 1597; With: James Wroughton	Succeeded by Richard Browne; Richard George
Preceded by Sir George Gifford; Robert Master	Member of Parliament for Cricklade; 1604–1611; With: Sir John Hungerford	Succeeded by Sir Thomas Monson, 1st Baronet; Sir John Eyre
Preceded by Sir Francis Popham; Sir John Thynne	Member of Parliament for Wiltshire; 1614; With: Sir Thomas Howard	Succeeded by Sir Francis Seymour; Sir Edward Bayntun
Preceded by Sir Roger Dalison; Sir Neville Poole	Member of Parliament for Malmesbury; 1621–1622; With: Sir Edward Wardour	Succeeded by Sir Edward Wardour; Thomas Hatton
Preceded by Sir Richard Wenman; Sir William Cope	Member of Parliament for Oxfordshire; 1624; With: Sir William Cope	Succeeded by Edward Wray; Sir Richard Wenman
Preceded by Sir Francis Seymour; Sir Henry Ley	Member of Parliament for Wiltshire; 1626; With: Walter Long	Succeeded by Sir William Button; Sir Francis Seymour
