= William Master =

William Master may refer to:

- Sir William Master (MP for Cirencester)
- William Master (author), his son, English divine and writer
- William Master (MP for Ipswich)
