= George Bull =

English Bishop of St David's (1634–1710)

- Bishop of St David's
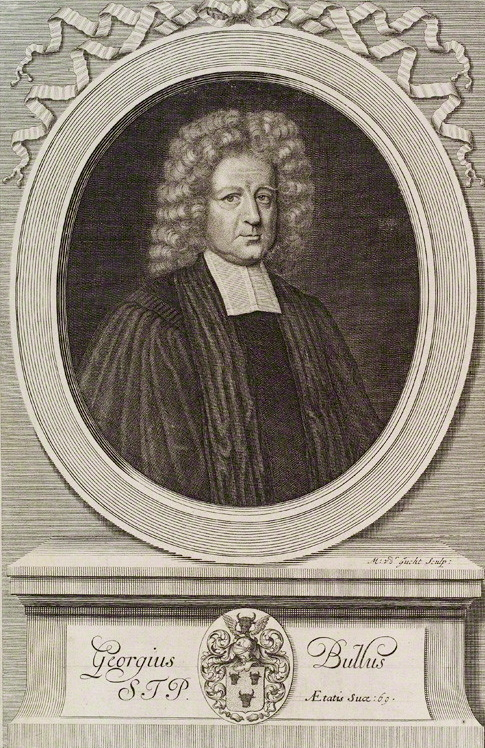
- Church: Church of England
- Diocese: Diocese of St Davids
- Installed: 1705
- Term ended: 1710
- Predecessor: Thomas Watson
- Successor: Philip Bisse

Personal details
- Born: 25 March 1634 Wells, Somerset, England
- Died: 17 February 1710 (aged 75) Brecknock, Wales
- Occupation: Bishop, theologian

George Bull (25 March 1634 – 17 February 1710) was an English theologian and Bishop of St David's.

== Life ==
He was born, 25 March 1634, in the parish of St Cuthbert, Wells, and educated in the grammar school at Wells, and then at Blundell's School in Tiverton under Samuel Butler. Before he was fourteen years old he went into residence at Exeter College, Oxford, where he became a friend of Thomas Clifford. In 1649, his tutor Baldwin Ackland refused to take the engagement, and together they left the university and settled at North Cadbury in Somerset.

He then studied under William Thomas, rector of Ubley and a puritan divine; Bull, however, was more influenced by his son Samuel Thomas, who directed Bull to read Richard Hooker, Henry Hammond, and Jeremy Taylor. On leaving Thomas, Bull applied to Robert Skinner, the ejected bishop of Oxford, for episcopal ordination, and was ordained by him deacon and priest the same day, aged 21. After his ordination he took the small living of St George's, near Bristol. Bull, like Robert Sanderson and others, used the church prayers, which he knew by heart, without the book. He used to spend two months every year at Oxford and on his way there and back he visited Sir William Master of Abbey House, Cirencester. He met in this way the rector Alexander Gregory, whose daughter Bridget he married on Ascension Day, 1658. William Master performed the ceremony of marriage according to the form prescribed in the Book of Common Prayer, although that usage was forbidden under penalty at the time. In the same year he was presented to the rectory of Siddington St Mary's, near Cirencester, through the influence of Lady Pool, the lady of the manor. In 1659 the rectory at Siddington became one of the many places of meeting at which the friends of the exiled dynasty assembled to concert measures for the Restoration of Charles II of England.

In 1662 he was presented to the vicarage of Siddington St Peter's by Lord Clarendon, at the request of William Nicholson, bishop of Gloucester. This was a contiguous parish, and he held it with Siddington St Mary's; the two villages together did not contain more than thirty families. Bull was rector of Siddington for twenty-seven years, and encountered opposition from dissenting parishioners. After the publication of the Defensio (1685), dedicated to Heneage Finch, 1st Earl of Nottingham who had presented him in 1678 to a prebend at Gloucester, Bull was given the rectory of Avening. In 1686 he was appointed by Archbishop William Sancroft to the archdeaconry of Llandaff; and John Fell managed him the degree of D.D. at Oxford, though he had never taken any previous degree.

After the 1688 Glorious Revolution he was placed on the commission of peace, and continued to act as a magistrate until he was made a bishop, in connection with the Society for the Reformation of Manners. In March 1705 Bull was appointed bishop of St David's, but he was aged and infirm. He started to tour his diocese, but illness detained him at Brecknock, where he resided: his son-in-law, Mr. Stevens, and Mr. Powell went as his commissioners, and during the whole period he was failing. He died 17 February 1710, and was buried at Brecknock. His life was written by Robert Nelson.

== Theology ==
Bull has a high place among Anglican theologians, and as a defender of the doctrine of the Trinity was held in high esteem even by Roman Catholic controversialists in Europe, despite Petavius, a Jesuit theologian, being one of his opponents.

He had an Arminian theology. He adopted an anti-Calvinist stance both in Defensio and Harmonia Apostolica.

== Works ==
He wrote four major theological treatises in Latin, one on justification and three on the Trinity. The Latin works were collected and edited by John Ernest Grabe in 1703, with a preface and annotations by the editor, in one volume folio. These works have been translated into English at various times. A translation of the Harmonia Apostolica was made by Thomas Wilkinson of Great Houghton in 1801. The Harmonia, Examen Censurae, Defensio, and Judicium formed part of the Library of Anglo-Catholic Theology published at Oxford 1842-55. The Opinion of the Catholic Church, a translation of the Judicium, was published with a memoir of Bull's life by Thomas Rankin in 1825, and a full edition of all the works of Bull (including the sermons and Nelson's Life) revised by Edward Burton was published, in seven volumes, at the Clarendon Press, Oxford, in 1827.

=== The Harmonia Apostolica ===
He wrote his first book, the Harmonia Apostolica, in an attempt to reconcile the apparent discrepancies between St Paul and the Epistle of James on the relationship of faith and good works in Christian justification. He advocated the principle that Paul the Apostle ought to be interpreted by St James, not St James by St Paul, on the ground that St James wrote later, and was presumed acquainted with St Paul's teaching. Bishop George Morley wrote a pastoral letter to his clergy against Bull; Thomas Barlow lectured against him at Oxford; Thomas Tully wrote an answer, in which he is said to have been assisted by Morley and Barlow; Charles Gataker, son of Thomas Gataker, Thomas Truman and John Toombes, nonconformists, also wrote against him. The Harmonia Apostolica was published in 1669-70, and his Examen Censures (his reply to Gataker), and his Apologia pro Harmonia (his reply to Barlow) in 1675.

=== The Defensio ===
His advocacy of the necessity of good works caused his adversaries to insinuate that he was a Socinian. His move onto the polemical ground of trinitarianism was therefore prompted by the need to clarify his position, in Defensio Fidei Nicaenae (1685). It was finished in 1680, but was turned down by three publishers. It appeared with the backing of William Jane, and John Fell who subsidised the cost of publication. It was stylish and well received, with praise from Jacques-Bénigne Bossuet. The context was that Petavius and Simon Episcopius, to take two examples, denied that the ante-Nicene Church Fathers held the same doctrines as those which were established at the Council of Nicaea. Bull took upon himself to prove that they did, and concentrated on the opinions of the ante-Nicene fathers, excluding other controversies.

A substantial excerpt from the Defensio Fidei Nicaenae was reprinted by Abbé Migne in his seventh volume devoted to Origen in the Patrologia Graeca (vol. XVII)

=== Further trinitarian works ===
Bull's next work, the Judicium Ecclesiae Catholicae (1694), supplements the Defensio. Episcopius held that the Nicene fathers did not consider a belief in our Lord's true and proper divinity as an indispensable term of catholic communion; Bull wrote the Judicium to prove that they did. His last work on the trinitarian question, entitled Primitiva et Apostolica Traditio, was directed against the opinion of Daniel Zwicker, that Christ's divinity, preexistence, and incarnation were inventions of early heretics.

=== Other works ===
He wrote also Corruptions of the Church of Rome. Robert Nelson, Bull's pupil and biographer, had sent Jacques-Bénigne Bossuet a copy of the Judicium. Bossuet was pleased with this work also, and Bull had congratulations from the clergy of France for defending the divinity of Christ. The Corruptions was Bull's reply to Bossuet's wondering aloud why Bull was not a Catholic. It reached a fourth edition in 1714, and was translated into Italian. A Companion to Candidates for Orders, or the Great Importance of the Priestly Office was published after his death, in 1714. His son Robert published his sermons after his death, twenty in number.

== Bibliography ==
- Edward Yardley, Menevia Sacra, (?between 1739–1761), edited by Francis Green 1927
- J.-P. Migne, Patrologia Graeca, tom. XVII (Origenes, tom. VII), col.1285-1330, 1857

== Notes and references ==
=== Sources ===
- Levitin, Dmitri (2015). Ancient wisdom in the age of the new science : histories of philosophy in England, c. 1640-1700. Cambridge: Cambridge University Press.

Attribution

- This article incorporates text from a publication now in the public domain: "Bull, George". Dictionary of National Biography. London: Smith, Elder & Co. 1885–1900.

Church of England titles
Preceded by vacancy from 1699; Thomas Watson	Bishop of St David's; 1705–1710	Succeeded by Philip Bisse
