= Thomas Chester-Master =

Thomas Chester-Master may refer to:

- Thomas Chester-Master (1815–1899), Member of Parliament (MP) for Cirencester 1837–1844
- Thomas Chester-Master (1841–1914), MP for Cirencester 1878–1885, 1892–1893
