= Thomas Master =

Thomas Master may refer to:

- Thomas Master (died 1643) (1603–1643), English poet and divine
- Thomas Master (died 1680) (1624–1680), English MP, 1660–1680
- Thomas Master (died 1770) (1690–1770), English MP, 1712–1747
- Thomas Master (died 1710) (1663–1710), English MP, 1685–1690
- Thomas Master (died 1749) (1717–1749), English MP, 1747–1749
