= Thomas Roe =

English diplomat (1581–1644)

Sir Thomas Roe
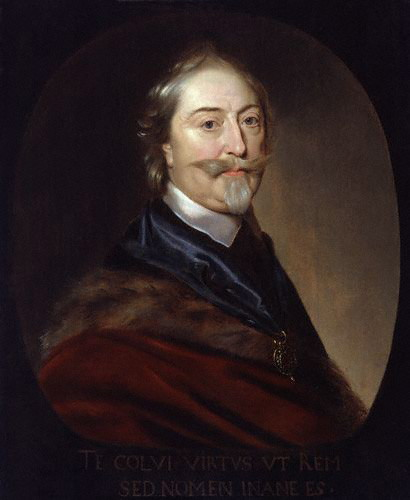
- Born: c. 1581; Low Leyton near Wanstead in Essex
- Died: 6 November 1644 (aged 62–63)
- Education: Magdalen College, Oxford
- Spouse: Lady Eleanor Beeston
- Parent(s): Sir Robert Rowe; Elinor Jermy

Sir Thomas Roe (c. 1581 – 6 November 1644) was an English diplomat for James VI and I and Charles I. Roe's voyages ranged from Central America to India; as ambassador, he represented England in the Mughal Empire, the Ottoman Empire, and the Holy Roman Empire. He held a seat in the House of Commons at various times between 1614 and 1644. Roe was an accomplished scholar and a patron of learning.

== Life ==
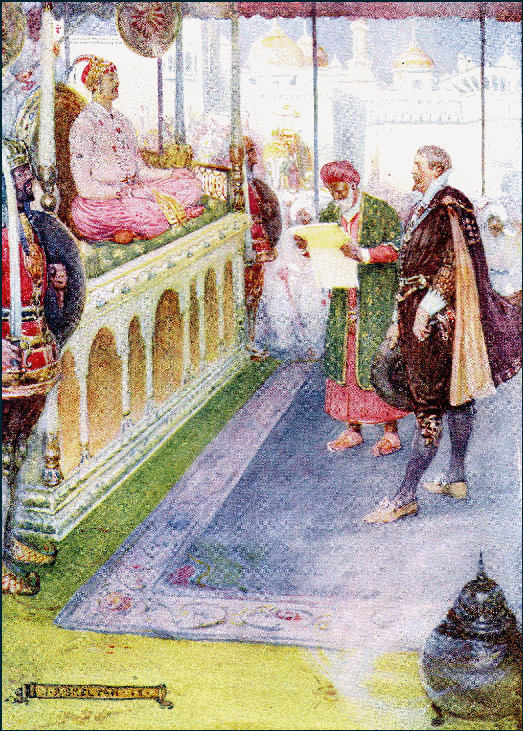
Sir Thomas standing before the Great Moghul, c. 1908 -in the court of Jehangir, the Emperor of Hindustan.

Roe was born at Low Leyton near Wanstead in Essex, the son of Sir Robert Rowe of Gloucestershire and Cranford, Middlesex, and his wife Elinor Jermy, daughter of Robert Jermy of Worstead, Norfolk. He matriculated at Magdalen College, Oxford, on 6 July 1593, at the age of twelve. In 1597 he entered Middle Temple and became esquire of the body to Queen Elizabeth I of England. He was knighted by James I on 23 July 1604, and became friendly with Henry, Prince of Wales, and also with Henry's sister Elizabeth, afterwards briefly Queen of Bohemia, with whom he maintained a correspondence and whose cause he championed.

Sir Thomas Roe died in 1644 at the age of about 63. He was buried in the parish church of St. Mary in Woodford, London.

=== Family ===
Roe married Eleanor, Lady Beeston, the young widowed daughter of Sir Thomas Cave of Stanford-on-Avon, Northamptonshire in 1614, just weeks before embarking for India. Eleanor did not go to India, but did accompany Roe on the subsequent embassy to Constantinople. The couple were childless and adopted Jane Rupa, an orphaned girl introduced by Queen Elizabeth of Bohemia. When Eleanor died in 1675 she was buried alongside him in the parish church of St. Mary, Woodford.

== Career ==
=== Amazon explorer ===
In 1610, Roe was sent by Prince Henry on a mission to the West Indies, during which he visited Guiana and the Amazon River. He tried to reach the Lake Parime location of the fabled El Dorado, that was represented in the map of Thomas Harriot in 1596. However, he failed then, and in two subsequent expeditions, to discover the gold he was seeking.

=== Ambassador to the Mughal Empire ===
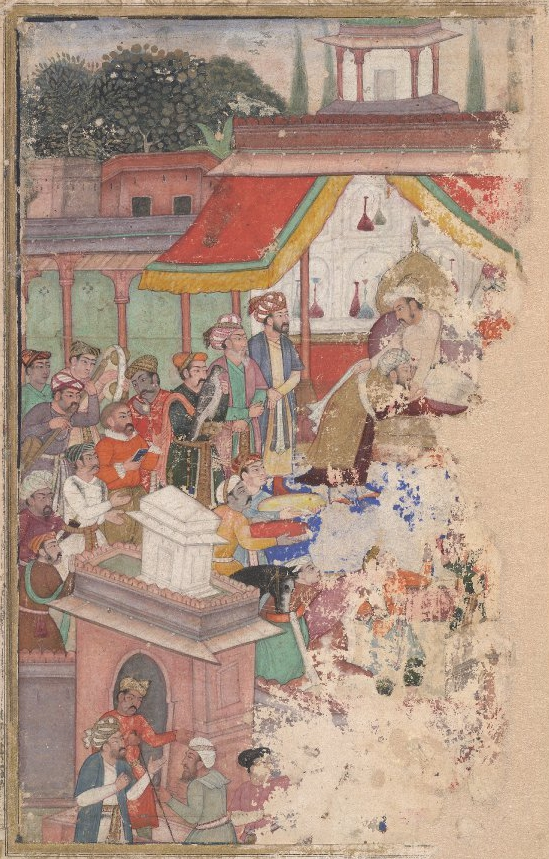
Jahangir investing a courtier with a robe of honour watched by Sir Thomas Roe, English ambassador to the court of Jahangir at Agra from 1615 to 1618, and others

In 1614, Roe was elected Member of Parliament (MP) for Tamworth.

The East India Company persuaded King James to send Roe as a royal envoy to the Agra court of the Great Mughal Emperor, Jahangir. Roe resided at Agra for three years, until 1619. At the Mughal court, Roe allegedly became a favourite of Jahangir and may have been his drinking partner; certainly he arrived with gifts of "many crates of red wine" and explained to him "What beere was? How made?"

The immediate result of the mission was to obtain permission and protection for an East India Company factory at Surat. While no major trading privileges were conceded by Jahingir, "Roe's mission was the beginning of a Mughal-Company relationship that would develop into something approaching a partnership and see the said Company gradually drawn into the Mughal nexus".

While Roe's detailed journals are a valuable source of information on Jahangir's reign, the Emperor did not return the favour, with no mention of Roe in his own voluminous diaries.

=== Indian Ocean and East African coast ===
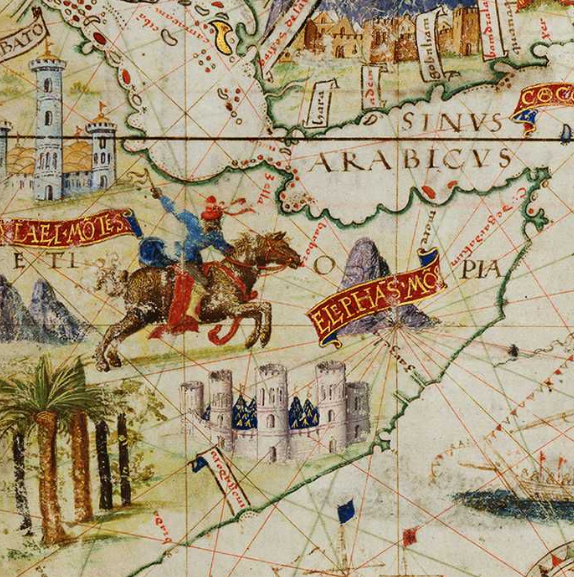
The walled city of Mogadishu as depicted on the Miller Atlas.

Prior to his arrival at the Mughal court, Roe explored the Eastern African islands and coastlines of the Indian Ocean, where he met the Somali navigator and ship pilot Maalim Ibrahim at one of the Islands of the Comoros in 1615. The latter influenced Roe's cartographic knowledge of the Indian Ocean through his map which Roe summarised as a "graduated map of high quality" drawn on parchment and as a result began adjusting his own. Maalim invited Roe to visit the city of Mogadishu, which at the time was the richest on the East African coast, and despite Roe appreciating the invitation, he could not split up the fleet heading for the Mughal Empire.

=== Ambassador to the Ottoman Empire ===
In 1621, Roe was elected MP for Cirencester.

Roe received diplomatic credentials to the Ottoman Empire on 6 September, arriving at Constantinople in December. In this role, he obtained an extension of the privileges of the English merchants. He concluded a treaty with Algiers in 1624, by which he secured the liberation of several hundred English captives. He also gained the support, by an English subsidy, of the Transylvanian Prince Gabriel Bethlen for the European Protestant alliance and the cause of the Palatinate.

Through his friendship with the Ecumenical Patriarch of Constantinople, Cyril Lucaris, the famous Codex Alexandrinus was presented to James I, and Roe himself collected several valuable manuscripts which he subsequently presented to the Bodleian Library. 29 Greek and other manuscripts, including an original copy of the synodal epistles of the council of Basle, he presented in 1628 to the Bodleian Library, after his letters of appointment had been revoked on 26 October 1627. But Roe did not leave the Porte until June 1628. A collection of 242 coins was given by his widow, at his desire, to the Bodleian Library after his death. He also searched for Greek marbles on behalf of the Duke of Buckingham and the second Earl of Arundel.

=== Diplomat in the Thirty Years' War ===
In 1629, Roe was successful in another mission undertaken, to arrange a peace between Sweden and Poland. In so doing, he enabled Gustavus Adolphus of Sweden to intervene decisively in the Thirty Years' War on the side of the Protestant German princes. Roe also negotiated treaties with Danzig and Denmark. A gold medal was struck in his honour on his return home in 1630 after attending the Diet of Regensburg.

=== Sponsor of Arctic exploration ===
In 1631, he sponsored the Arctic exploration of Luke Fox. Roes Welcome Sound was named in his honor.

=== English statesman and envoy ===
In January 1637, Roe was appointed Chancellor of the Order of the Garter, with a pension of £1200 a year.

In June 1640, Roe was made a privy councillor. In November of that year he was elected MP for Oxford University in the Long Parliament. He was appointed as England's ambassador to the Holy Roman Empire from 1641 to 1642. He took part in the peace conferences at Hamburg, Regensburg and Vienna, and used his influence to obtain the restoration of the Palatinate, the emperor declaring that he had "scarce ever met with an ambassador till now."

== Works ==
Sir Thomas Roe Travels to India

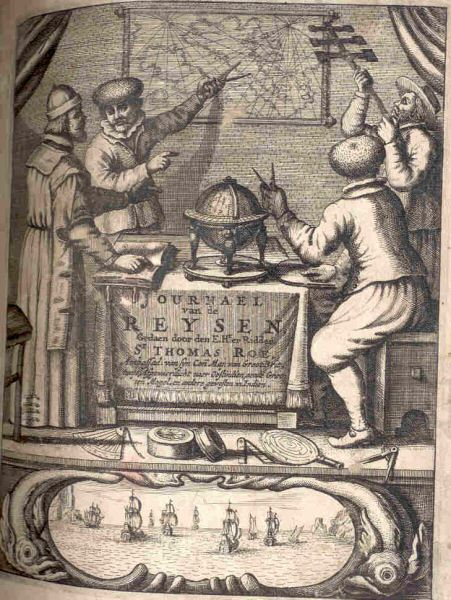
A plan of travel to India

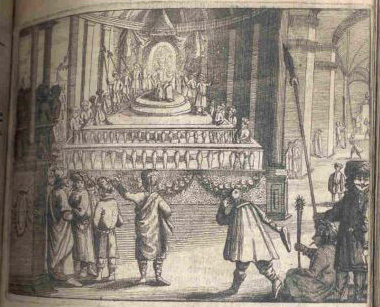
Sir Thomas Roe meets Great Mughal

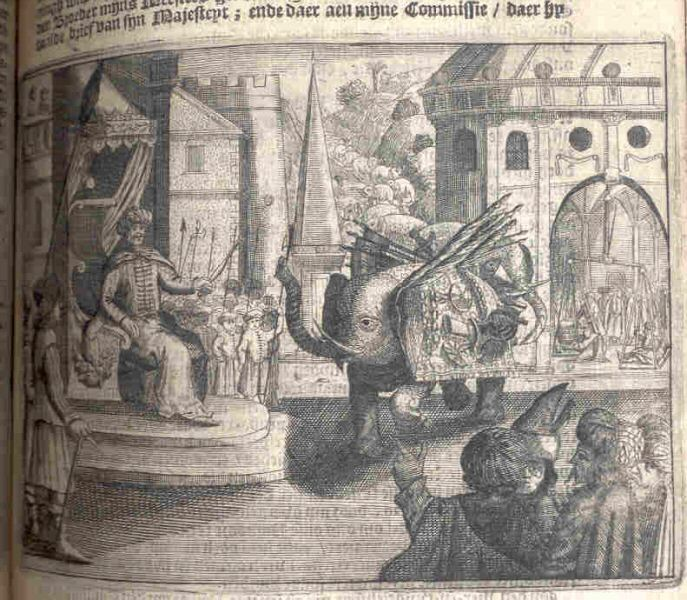
The Great Mughal Court

A Dutch account of Sir Thomas Roe's travel to Jahangir's court
- The Embassy of Sir Thomas Roe to the Court of the Great Mogul, 1615–1619, as narrated in his journal and correspondence

His Embassy of Sir Thomas Roe to the Court of the Great Mogul, 1615-1619, as narrated in his journal and correspondence, several times printed, has been re-edited, with an introduction by William Foster, for the Hakluyt Society (1899). This is a valuable contribution to the history of India in the early 17th century.

- Negotiations in his Embassy to the Ottoman Porte, 1621–28, vol. i

Vol. i. was published in 1740, but the work was not continued. Other correspondence, consisting of letters relating to his mission to Gustavus Adolphus, was edited by SR Gardiner for the Camden Society Miscellany (1875), vol. vii., and his correspondence with Lord Carew in 1615 and 1617 by Sir F. Maclean for the same society in 1860.

- True and Faithful Relation ... concerning the Death of Sultan Osman ... (1622)

Several of his manuscripts are in the British Museum collections. Roe published a True and Faithful Relation ... concerning the Death of Sultan Osman ..., 1622; a translation from Paolo Sarpi,

- Discourse upon the Resolution taken in the Valteline (1628); and in 1613 Dr T Wright published Quatuor Colloquia, consisting of theological disputations between himself and Roe; a poem by Roe is printed in Notes and Queries, iv. Ser. v. 9.
- The Swedish Intelligencer (1632–33), including an account of the career of Gustavus Adolphus and of the Diet of Ratisbon (Regensburg), is attributed to Roe in the catalogue of the British Museum. Several of his speeches, chiefly on currency and financial questions, were also published. Two other works in manuscripts are mentioned by Wood: Compendious Relation of the Proceedings ... of the Imperial Diet at Ratisbon and Journal of Several Proceedings of the Order of the Garter.
- Of Intelligence (circa 1630) kept as a manuscript in the National Archives (SP 9 / 201) it is written in the style of Francis Bacon's Essays. The question posed in Roe’s ‘essay’ concerns the best way to obtain power and influence at court, and the answer is through "intelligence", or information. The means to obtain this information, according to Roe, is a network of informers that can provide reliable news and accounts of events abroad. Therefore, Of Intelligence is an essay on the importance of establishing and maintaining an effective network of “intelligencers” and a wide range of conventional (as well as covert) sources of news. The tract could be considered one of the first studies on espionage.

=== Modern biographies ===
There are three modern biographies:

- Brown, Michael J. (1970). Itinerant Ambassador: The Life of Sir Thomas Roe. Lexington: The University Press of Kentucky. ISBN 9780813151533.
- Strachan, Michael (1989). Sir Thomas Roe, 1581–1644. A Life. Salisbury: Michael Russell Publishing Ltd. ISBN 9780859551564.
- Das, Nandini (2023). Courting India. London: Bloomsbury. ISBN 9781526615640.

Parliament of England
Preceded by Sir Thomas Beaumont; Sir John Ferrers	Member of Parliament for Tamworth; 1614; With: Sir Percival Willoughby	Succeeded by Sir Thomas Puckering; John Ferrers
Preceded by Sir Anthony Manie; Robert Strange	Member of Parliament for Cirencester; 1621–1622; With: Thomas Nicholas	Succeeded by Henry Poole; Sir William Master
Preceded by Sir Francis Windebanke; Sir John Danvers	Member of Parliament for Oxford University; 1640–1644; With: John Selden	Succeeded by John Selden
