= William Cripps =

British politician

Junior Lord of the Treasury
- In office 1845–1846
- Prime Minister: Robert Peel
- Preceded by: The Lord Arthur Lennox
- Succeeded by: Viscount Ebrington; The O'Conor Don; Sir William Gibson-Craig, Bt; Henry Rich

Member of Parliament for Cirencester
- In office 1841–1848 Serving with Thomas Chester-Master, Viscount Villiers
- Preceded by: Joseph Cripps; Thomas Chester-Master
- Succeeded by: Joseph Mullings; Viscount Villiers

Personal details
- Born: 1 January 1805
- Died: 11 May 1848 (aged 43)
- Spouse: Mary Anne Harrison (m. 1839)
- Relations: William Harrison Cripps (nephew); Charles Cripps, 1st Baron Parmoor (nephew)
- Children: Wilfred Joseph Cripps
- Parent(s): Joseph Cripps; Dorothea Harrison
- Education: Trinity College, Oxford

William Cripps (1 January 1805 – 11 May 1848) was a British Conservative Member of Parliament.

== Early life ==
Cripps was born 1 January 1805 and baptised at Cirencester on 17 May 1805. He was the eldest son of Joseph Cripps, and, his second wife, Dorothea Harrison. His father served as MP for Cirencester. His brother, Henry William Cripps, QC, was the father of William Harrison Cripps, the prominent British surgeon, and politician Charles Cripps, 1st Baron Parmoor.

Cripps matriculated at Trinity College, Oxford on 25 May 1822, aged 17. He received a B.A. in 1826 and M.A. in 1829.

== Career ==
He was admitted to the Inner Temple and became a barrister-at-law in 1829.

He sat himself for the constituency of Cirencester, from 1841 until his death in 1848. From 1845 until 1846 he held minor office in Sir Robert Peel's government as a Junior Lord of the Treasury.

== Personal life ==
On 29 January 1839, Cripps was married to Mary Anne Harrison (1805–1892) at Streatham Church, Surrey. Mary Anne was the eldest daughter of Benjamin Harrison of Clapham Common. They were the parents of:

- William Frederick Cripps (b. 1840), who was born at St James's Palace.
- Wilfred Joseph Cripps (1841–1903), who married Maria Harriet Arabella Daniel-Tyssen, sister of Charles Daniel-Tyssen, in 1870. After her death in 1881, he married Countess Helene von Bismarck-Schierstein, daughter of Count Friedrich von Bismarck and granddaughter of Sir Henry Williams-Wynn, in 1884.
- Catherine Dorothy Cripps (1842–1909)
- Edmund William Cripps (1843–1899), who married Ada Radcliffe, a daughter of Lt.Gen. Robert Parker Radcliffe.
- Walter Mainwaring Cripps (1844–1900).

Cripps died on 11 May 1848 and was buried in St. Catherine's Chapel within Cirencester Church on 18 May 1848. His will, dated 31 July 1840, was proved 30 August 1848.

Parliament of the United Kingdom
Preceded by Joseph Cripps; Thomas Chester-Master	Member of Parliament for Cirencester; 1841–1848; With: Thomas Chester-Master 1837–1844; Viscount Villiers 1844–1852	Succeeded by Joseph Mullings; Viscount Villiers
Political offices
Preceded by The Lord Arthur Lennox	Junior Lord of the Treasury; 1845–1846	Succeeded by Viscount Ebrington; The O'Conor Don; Sir William Gibson-Craig, Bt; Henry Rich
