= Henry Powle =

English lawyer and politician (1630–1692)

Henry Powle (18 October 1630 – 21 November 1692) was an English lawyer and politician who sat in the House of Commons at various times between 1660 and 1690, and was Speaker of the House of Commons from January 1689 to February 1690. He was also Master of the Rolls.

== Early life ==
Born at Shottesbrook, Berkshire in 1630, he was the second son of Henry Powle, who was sheriff for Berkshire in 1633, by his wife Katherine, daughter of Matthew Herbert of Monmouth. He matriculated from Christ Church, Oxford, on 16 December 1646. He was admitted to Lincoln's Inn on 11 May 1647, and became a barrister in 1654 and bencher in 1659. In April 1660 he was elected Member of Parliament for Cirencester in the Convention Parliament.

== Member of Parliament under Charles II ==
On 3 January 1671, Powle was elected MP for Cirencester again in the Cavalier Parliament. At the time he held property at Williamstrop (or Williamstrip), Coln St. Aldwyns, Gloucestershire, or the neighbouring parish of Quenington, and was usually described as of the latter place. He first appeared in debate in February 1673, when he attacked Lord-chancellor Shaftesbury's practice of issuing writs for by-elections during the recess without the speaker's warrant. As a result of the debate all the elections were declared void, 6 February 1673. Subsequently, he opposed the Declaration of Indulgence, Charles II of England's measure of religious toleration, wishing disabilities for Catholics and dissenters to continue.

Powle identified himself with the opponents of the court, and declined to support the king's claim to the dispensing power. He promoted the passing of the Test Act in March. In the new session in October, Powle led the attack on the proposed marriage between the Duke of York and the Princess Mary of Modena, and the king at once directed a prorogation. But before the arrival of Black Rod to announce it, Powle's motion for an address was carried with little opposition. A week later another short session opened. Powle advised the withholding of supply till the grievances connected with Catholic favourites and a standing army were redressed, and he led the attack on the king's 'villainous councillors,’ assailing in particular Anglesey and Lauderdale. Next year he denounced George Villiers, 2nd Duke of Buckingham, and had a large share in driving him from office.

In May 1677 he urged the wisdom of a Dutch alliance. When the Commons sent an address to the king dictating such an alliance on 4 February 1678, Charles indignantly summoned them to the banqueting-room at Whitehall Palace. After their return to the House Powle stood up, but Sir Edward Seymour, the Speaker, informed him that the house was adjourned by the king's pleasure. Powle insisted, and the Speaker sprang out of the chair and, after a struggle, got away. On their re-assembling five days later Powle declared that the whole liberty of the house was threatened by the Speaker's conduct. In May 1678, when Charles sent a message to the house to hasten supply, Powle once more insisted on the prior consideration of grievances. Powle supported the impeachment of Danby, but in the agitation of the Popish Plot he kept a low profile.

Powle was returned for both Cirencester and East Grinstead, Sussex, in the First Exclusion Parliament, which met on 6 March 1679. He elected to represent Cirencester. Seymour, the speaker chosen by the commons, was declined by the king. Powle denied that the king had such power of refusal, and moved an address 'that we desire time to think of it.' During the discussion that followed, Powle himself was named as speaker, but was not allowed to proceed. Finally, Serjeant Gregory was elected. The new parliament pursued the attack on Danby. "Lyttleton and Powle," says Gilbert Burnet, "led the matters of the House of Commons with the greatest dexterity and care". Meanwhile, Paul Barillon, the French ambassador, who wanted to ruin Danby, had entered into correspondence with Powle and other leaders of the opposition. Powle, like Harbord and Lyttleton, finally accepted a pension from Barillon of five hundred guineas a year.

After Danby's committal to the Tower of London and Charles's acceptance of Sir William Temple's abortive scheme of government by a new composite privy council of thirty members, Powle was, with four other commoners, admitted to the council on 21 April 1678. In the Second Exclusion Parliament, which was called for October 1679, Powle was returned for Cirencester. But parliament was prorogued from time to time without assembling, and Powle, acting on Shaftesbury's advice, retired from the council on 17 April. Parliament met at length in October 1680. Powle at once arraigned the conduct of the chief justice, William Scroggs, who had discharged the grand jury before they were able to consider Shaftesbury's indictment of the Duke of York. In the renewed debates on the Exclusion Bill Powle held back to keep relations open with the king, but in the proceedings of December 1680 against Lord Stafford, he took a vehement part. Although returned for East Grinstead to Charles's Oxford parliament (20 March 1681 and 28 March 1681), Powle took little further part in politics until the Glorious Revolution.

== Member of Parliament under William and Mary ==
Powle was a member of the Royal Society, and was probably abroad for part of the time before the Glorious Revolution. He gained the confidence of William III, at that point the Prince of Orange, and on 16 December 1688 he and Sir Robert Howard held a long and private interview with the prince at Windsor. When William called together at St. James's a number of members of Charles II's parliaments and common councilmen, Powle attended at the head of 160 former members of the House of Commons. On their return to Westminster to consider the best method of calling a free parliament, he was chosen chairman. He bluntly asserted that "the wish of the prince is sufficient warrant for our assembling"; and on the following morning he read addresses to William, praying that he would assume the administration and call a convention. To the Convention parliament Powle was returned, with Sir Christopher Wren, for Windsor. He was voted to the Speaker's chair over the head of his old opponent, Sir Edward Seymour (22 January 1689).

Powle's speech on the opening of the convention exercised influence on subsequent debates. As Speaker, he congratulated William and Mary on their coronation, 13 April 1689, and presented to William the Bill of Rights on 16 December 1689. Powle was summoned, with seven other commoners, to William's first privy council. On the remodelling of the judicial bench, when John Holt was appointed justice of the king's bench and Sir Robert Atkyns chief baron, Powle, on 13 March 1690, received the patent of master of the rolls.

While the convention sat, William relied on Powle's advice. Powle was returned for Cirencester for William's first parliament, which met on 20 March 1690, but was not re-elected Speaker and was unseated on petition. Powle then devoted himself to his duties as master of the rolls, and successfully claimed, in accordance with precedent, a writ of summons to attend parliament as an assistant to the House of Lords. He spoke in the upper house in favour of the Abjuration Bill on 24 April 1690, but wished the oath imposed sparingly and only on office-holders.

== Death ==
He died intestate on 21 November 1692, and was buried within the communion-rails of Quenington church, Gloucestershire, where a monument was erected to his memory. He is there described as master of the rolls and one of the judges delegates of the admiralty.

== Legacy ==
Powle's historical, legal, and antiquarian knowledge was highly esteemed. With the aid of John Bagford, he formed a large library of manuscripts and records. A few of these now constitute the nucleus of the Lansdowne collection in the British Museum. Other portions were dispersed, and were for a time in the possession of Lord Somers, Sir Joseph Jekyll, and Philip, earl Hardwicke. Powle's arms were placed in the window of the Rolls chapel and also of Lincoln's Inn hall.

== Personal life ==
Powle married, first, in 1659, Elizabeth, daughter of the first Lord Newport of High Ercall. She died on 28 July 1672, and was buried at Quenington. His second wife was Frances, a daughter of Lionel Cranfield, 1st Earl of Middlesex, and widow of Richard Sackville, 5th Earl of Dorset. By his first wife he left an only child, Katharine, who married Henry, eldest son of Henry Ireton, conveying to him the estates of Quenington and Williamstrop. Powle was subsequently involved in lawsuits over the property of his second wife. Powle's brother Richard was M.P. for Berkshire in 1660–1, was knighted in 1661, and died in 1678.

In 1676–7 Powle bought the estate of Ramsbury Manor, Wiltshire. He quickly sold most of the leaseholds and copyholds, and in 1681 sold the remainder, together with the manor house and its park and woods, to Sir William Jones.

== Notes ==
Attribution

This article incorporates text from a publication now in the public domain: "Powle, Henry". Dictionary of National Biography. London: Smith, Elder & Co. 1885–1900.

Parliament of England
Preceded by Nathaniel Rich	Member of Parliament for Cirencester; 1660–1661; With: Thomas Master	Succeeded by The 1st Earl of Newburgh; John George
Preceded by The 1st Earl of Newburgh; John George	Member of Parliament for Cirencester; 1671–1685; With: John George 1671–1679; Sir Robert Atkyns 1679–1685	Succeeded by Thomas Master; The 2nd Earl of Newburgh
Preceded by Thomas Pelham; Edward Sackville	Member of Parliament for East Grinstead; 1679; With: Thomas Pelham	Succeeded by Thomas Pelham; Sir Thomas Littleton
Preceded by Goodwin Wharton; William Jephson	Member of Parliament for East Grinstead; 1681–1685; With: Sir Cyril Wyche	Succeeded by Simon Smith; Thomas Jones
Preceded by William Chiffinch; Richard Graham	Member of Parliament for Windsor; 1689–1690; With: Sir Christopher Wren 1689; Sir Algernon May 1689–1690	Succeeded by Sir Algernon May; Baptist May
Preceded by Thomas Master; John Grobham Howe	Member of Parliament for Cirencester; 1690; With: Richard Grobham Howe	Succeeded by Richard Grobham Howe; John Grobham Howe
Political offices
Preceded by Sir John Trevor	Speaker of the House of Commons; 1688-1689	Succeeded by Sir John Trevor
Legal offices
Preceded by Sir John Trevor	Master of the Rolls; 1689–1693	Succeeded by Sir John Trevor
