= Thomas Nicholas (MP) =

English politician

Thomas Nicholas (c. 1575 – 13/14 August 1638) was an English politician who sat in the House of Commons from 1621 to 1622.

Nicholas was the eldest son of Reginald Nicholas of Prestbury, Gloucestershire. He was educated in the law at the New Inn and the Middle Temple (1594).

In 1621, he was elected Member of Parliament for Cirencester. He was a J.P. for Gloucestershire and was appointed High Sheriff of Gloucestershire for 1626–27.

Nicholas married twice: firstly Jane, daughter of John Audley and widow of Andrew Ketelby of Gloucestershire; and secondly Bridget, the daughter of Michael Strange of Cirencester, Gloucestershire and Somerford Keynes, Wiltshire. He had no children and was buried at Stratton.

Parliament of England
Preceded by Sir Anthony Manie; Robert Strange	Member of Parliament for Cirencester; 1621–1622; With: Sir Thomas Roe	Succeeded by Henry Poole; Sir William Master
