= Richard George =

Richard George may refer to:

- Richard George (javelin thrower) (born 1953), American javelin thrower
- Rick George, athletic director of Colorado Buffaloes
- Richard George (MP) (1562–c.1613) for Cirencester
- Richard George (manufacturer) (1944–2016), British food manufacturer
- Richard Lloyd George, 2nd Earl Lloyd-George of Dwyfor (1889–1968), British soldier and peer

== See also ==
- Richard St George (disambiguation)
