= Thomas Master (died 1680) =

Member of the Parliament of England

Thomas Master (1624 – 5 November 1680) was an English politician who sat in the House of Commons in 1660.

Master was the son of Sir William Master of Cirencester Abbey and his wife Alice Estcourt, daughter of Sir Edward Estcourt of Salisbury, Wiltshire and was baptised on 30 June 1624. He was a student of Lincoln's Inn in 1647.

In April 1660, Master was elected Member of Parliament for Cirencester in the Convention Parliament. He was captain of foot militia in Gloucestershire in April 1660. On the Restoration, he signed the Gloucestershire address welcoming King Charles II and was one of those nominated for the title Knight of the Royal Oak when his income was assessed at £1,000 a year. He was J.P. from July 1660 until his death and commissioner for assessment from August 1660. In 1662 he was commissioner for loyal and indigent officers. He was commissioner of inquiry for Kingswood chase in 1671. In the same year he became embroiled in an altercation with John Grobham Howe at a by-election. Howe hit him with an iron-tipped cane and was subsequently convicted of riot.

Master died at the age of about 56 and was buried at Cirencester.

Master married Elizabeth Dyke, daughter of Sir Thomas Dyke of Horeham, Waldron, Sussex under a settlement of 27 January 1661 and had two sons of whom Thomas was also MP for Cirencester. His widow died on 28 January 1704.

Parliament of England
Preceded by Nathaniel Rich	Member of Parliament for Cirencester; 1660; With: Henry Powle	Succeeded by The Earl of Newburgh; John George
