= Henry Poole (died 1645) =

English politician

Henry Poole (1590–1645) was an English politician who sat in the House of Commons variously between 1624 and 1640.

== Biography ==
Poole was the son of Sir Henry Poole of Sapperton, Gloucestershire, former MP for Gloucestershire, and his wife Anne Wroughton, daughter of Sir William Wroughton of Broad Hinton, Wiltshire. He matriculated at Merton College, Oxford on 10 July 1607 and was a student of the Middle Temple in 1609. In 1616 he inherited an estate worth over £2000 a year from his father. He was a deputy lieutenant for Gloucestershire by 1624.

Poole served as member of parliament for Cirencester, of which he was the patron, in 1624 and 1625. In 1626 he gave his interest in the seat to his cousin Neville Poole. His opposition to various measures Charles I adopted to raise money, such as the 'forced loan' and Ship money led to occasional imprisonment and suspensions from sitting as a justice of the peace. In April 1640 he again sat for Cirencester in the Short Parliament.

Despite his earlier opposition to the king's financial measures, he supported Charles I in the civil war, although his support may have been less than wholehearted. His reward was to be knighted. Following Poole's death in 1645 his son William compounded for delinquency and in 1647 was fined £1494. The Pooles had argued that father and son were forced to comply with the Royalist party and had never acted against parliament. The family's fortunes never fully recovered from the effects of the civil war, and their estate at Sapperton was sold by his grandson Henry in 1661.

== Family ==
Poole married Hon. Beatrix Brydges daughter of William Brydges, 4th Baron Chandos and had three children:

- William (d. 1651) married Meriel (d. 1644), daughter of Robert Tracy, 2nd Viscount Tracy
- Anne married James Livingston, 1st Earl of Newburgh
- Beatrice married Thomas Pope, 3rd Earl of Downe.

Parliament of England
Preceded by Sir Thomas Roe; Thomas Nicholas	Member of Parliament for Cirencester; 1624–1625; With: Sir William Master 1624; Sir Miles Sandys 1625	Succeeded by Sir Neville Poole; John George
Vacant Parliament suspended since 1629	Member of Parliament for Cirencester; 1640; With: John George	Succeeded by Sir Theobald Gorges; John George
