= Thomas Master (died 1710) =

Thomas Master (c. 1663 - 1710) was an English politician who sat in the House of Commons from 1685 to 1690.

Master was the son of Thomas Master of Cirencester Abbey and his wife Elizabeth Dyke, daughter of Sir Thomas Dyke of Horeham, Waldron, Sussex and was baptised on 4 June 1663. He was a student of Christ Church, Oxford in 1680 and succeeded his father in the same year. In 1685, he was elected Member of Parliament for Cirencester. He also became Deputy Lieutenant and J.P. for Gloucestershire in 1685. He was relieved of these positions in February and March 1688 bur was restored to the position of J.P. in October 1688. In 1689 he was re-elected MP for Cirencester. He was commissioner for assessment from 1689 to 1690.

Master died at the age of about 47 and was buried at Cirencester on 14 Sept. 1710.

Master married Elizabeth Driver, daughter of John Driver of Aston, Gloucestershire under a marriage settlement of June 1688. He had one son Thomas who was also MP for Cirencester.

Parliament of England
Preceded by Henry Powle; Sir Robert Atkyns	Member of Parliament for Cirencester; 1685–1690; With: The Earl of Newburgh	Succeeded by The Earl of Newburgh; John Grobham Howe
