= Friedrich von Bismarck =

German lawyer and politician

Friedrich August Ludwig, Graf von Bismarck (from 1862 von Bismarck-Schierstein) (19 August 1809 – 16 April 1893) was a German lawyer and Member of Parliament.

== Early life ==
Bismarck was born on 19 August 1809 in Biebrich, Wiesbaden into the Rhineland branch of the Schönhausen line of the House of Bismarck. He was the eldest son of Johann Heinrich Ludwig von Bismark (1774–1816) and his wife Anna Maria von Breidbach zu Bürresheim (1789–1871). Among his siblings were Countess Auguste Antonie Luise (wife of Baron Hans Carl von Thüngen), Countess Franziska Friederike Sophie Charlotte (wife of Count Karl von Giech), and Count Karl Friedrich Alexander von Bismarck. His paternal grandfather was Heinrich Christian von Bismarck.

In 1830, with the permission of the King William I of Württemberg, he was adopted by his uncle Friedrich Wilhelm von Bismarck, and permitted to use the title of Count of Württemberg.

== Career ==
Friedrich completed his law studies and entered the service of the Prussian state. He later became a Nassau government and legation councilor, and was also a chamberlain.

From 1846 to 1847, he was a member of the House of Lords (Herrenbank) of the Estates of Nassau as representative of Prince Philipp von der Leyen (grandson of Philip Francis, Prince of Leyen) and, from 1855 to 1857, he was a member of the Chamber of Deputies (Landesdeputiertenversammlung) as representative of Archduke Stephen of Austria. In 1862, he was created Graf Bismarck-Schierstein by King William I of Prussia. In 1866 he was their envoy to the Federal Convention of the German Confederation.

In Bad Ems he served as bathing inspector during the spa period and director of the bathing establishments from 1855 to 1866.

== Personal life ==
On 14 June 1847, Bismarck married the English born Charlotte Henrietta Williams-Wynn (1815–1873) in Copenhagen where her father, Sir Henry Williams-Wynn, was serving as British Envoy to Denmark. Together, they were the parents of:

- Gräfin Marie Henriette Katharina von Bismarck-Schierstein (b. 1848).
- Gräfin Helene Auguste Wilhelmine von Bismarck-Schierstein (1850–1903), who married Maj. Wilfred Joseph Cripps, son of William Cripps, MP for Cirencester.
- Graf Henry von Bismarck-Schierstein (1852–1871), who died unmarried.
- Graf Otto Franz Karl von Bismarck-Schierstein (1854–1910), a lieutenant in the Landwehr cavalry.

Count Bismarck died on 16 April 1893 in Wiesbaden-Schierstein. The title passed to his son but became extinct upon his death in 1910.
