= Estcourt baronets =

Extinct baronetcy in the Baronetage of England

Escutcheon of the Estcourt baronets of Newton

The Estcourt Baronetcy, of Newton in the County of Wiltshire, was a title in the Baronetage of England. It was created on 17 March 1627 for Giles Estcourt, member of parliament for Cirencester. The title became extinct on the death of the third baronet in circa 1684.

== Estcourt baronets, of Newton (1627) ==
- Sir Giles Estcourt, 1st Baronet (c. 1601 – c. 1650)
- Sir Giles Estcourt, 2nd Baronet (died c. 1676)
- Sir William Estcourt, 3rd Baronet (died c. 1684)
