= John George (died 1677) =

English lawyer and politician

Personal details
- Born: 1594
- Died: 1677 (aged 82–83)

John George (1594–1677) was an English lawyer and politician who sat in the House of Commons at various times between 1626 and 1678.

George was the eldest surviving son of Robert George of Baunton and his wife Margaret Oldisworth, daughter of Edward Oldisworth of Gloucester. He was baptised on 15 September 1594. He was awarded BA from Magdalen Hall, Oxford on 6 July 1614. He entered Middle Temple on 1 July 1615 and was called to the bar on 23 May 1623. He was Lord of the Manor of Baunton and a J.P. and deputy lieutenant for Gloucestershire.

In 1626 George was elected member of parliament for Cirencester, and was re-elected in 1628 until 1629 when King Charles decided to rule without parliament for eleven years. In April 1640, he was re-elected MP for Cirencester in the Short Parliament and in November 1640 he was re-elected for the Long Parliament. In August 1642, he formed a garrison for Parliament at Cirencester, but was captured by Prince Rupert in the spring of 1643 and taken to Oxford. The Earl of Forth threatened to execute George if Colonel Fiennes, the parliamentary governor of Bristol, executed his prisoners. Although Fiennes did put his prisoners to death, the Earl of Forth relented and spared George. George thereupon changed his views and supported the king. He was accordingly disabled from sitting in parliament and retired to his estates. He became a bencher of his inn in November 1653 and Treasurer in November 1658.

After the Restoration, George was re-elected MP for Cirencester in 1661 for the Cavalier Parliament and sat until his death.

George probably died in December 1678 aged 85 and was buried at Baunton on 6 January 1679.

George married Elizabeth Tirrell, daughter of John Tirrell of St Ives, Huntingdonshire and had five sons and a daughter.

Parliament of England
| Preceded by Sir Miles Sandys; Henry Poole | Member of Parliament for Cirencester; 1626–1629; With: Sir Neville Poole 1626; Sir Giles Estcourt, 1st Baronet 1628–1629 | Parliament suspended until 1640 |
| Vacant Parliament suspended since 1629 | Member of Parliament for Cirencester; 1640–1645; With: Henry Poole 1640; Sir Theobald Gorges 1640–1645 | Succeeded by Thomas Fairfax, 3rd Lord Fairfax of Cameron; Nathaniel Rich |
| Preceded by Thomas Master; Henry Powle | Member of Parliament for Cirencester; 1661–1678; With: The Earl of Newburgh; Henry Powle | Succeeded by Henry Powle; Sir Robert Atkyns |
