= Robert Straunge =

English politician

Robert Straunge or Strange (c. 1587 – December 1630) was an English politician who sat in the House of Commons in 1614.

Strange was the eldest son of Michael Straunge of Cirencester. He was educated at Brasenose College, Oxford and Lincoln's Inn, from where he was called to the bar in 1614. The same year, Straunge was elected Member of Parliament for Cirencester.

He did not play any recorded role in that Parliament, and did not stand for re-election. He died in December 1630. His son-in-law, Richard Southby, sat in Parliament for Cirencester and later Berkshire.

Parliament of England
| Preceded by Arnold Oldsworth; Sir Anthony Manie | Member of Parliament for Cirencester; 1614; With: Sir Anthony Manie | Succeeded by Sir Thomas Roe; Thomas Nicholas |
