= John Master =

English physician

John Master (1637 – c.1680), was an English physician. He was the son of the politician William Master, brother of the clergyman and author William Master and assisted the medical author Thomas Willis.
