= 1893 Cirencester by-election =

UK parliamentary by-election

- 23 February 1893

Cirencester constituency
- Turnout: 9,132; 90.9% (▲9.1 pp)
Candidate	Harry Levy-Lawson	Thomas Chester-Master
Party	Liberal	Conservative
Popular vote	4,687	4,445
Percentage	51.3%	48.7%
MP before election
Thomas Chester-Master (annulled)
Elected MP
Harry Levy-Lawson

A by-election for the United Kingdom parliamentary constituency of Cirencester was held on 23 February 1893 after a court declared that votes in the by-election in 1892 had been declared equal. The seat was gained by the Liberal candidate Harry Levy-Lawson. The Conservative candidate Thomas Chester-Master was declared the victor of the 1892 by-election by 3 votes, but on petition and after scrutiny, the votes were declared equal and the 1893 by-election was held.

1893 Cirencester by-election
Party	Candidate	Votes	%	±%
Liberal	Harry Levy-Lawson	4,687	51.3	+0.4
Conservative	Thomas Chester-Master	4,445	48.7	−0.4
Majority		242	2.6	+0.8
Turnout		9,132	90.9	+9.1
Liberal gain from Conservative		Swing	+0.4	
