= Wilfred Joseph Cripps =

Wilfred Joseph Cripps CB FSA JP (8 June 1841 – 26 October 1903) was an English antiquarian and a writer on antique silver plate.

== Early life ==
Cripps was born in London into a wealthy family who profited from the wool trade in the Cotswolds and were prominent in Cirencester from the Elizabethan era. His father, William Cripps, and grandfather Joseph Cripps were both members of parliament.

Cripps was educated at Kensington Grammar School and King's College London. He matriculated in 1859 at Trinity College, Oxford, where he graduated B.A. in 1863 and M.A. in 1866. He was called to the bar in May 1865 at the Middle Temple and practised for some years on the Oxford circuit.

== Career ==
In the early 1870s W. J. Cripps began research on old English plate. In 1878 he published Old English Plate, which went through nine editions by 1906 and provided valuable information for buyers of antique plate. In June 1880 he was elected a fellow of the Society of Antiquaries of London. He was made a Companion of the Order of the Bath in the 1889 Birthday Honours.

Cripps's expert authority was universally recognised. In October 1880, associated with Sir Philip Cunliffe Owen, he examined by the request of the Russian government the magnificent imperial collection of plate in Russia, and in 1881 he was similarly employed in Sweden and Denmark and at Berlin. In 1880 he was a member of the English sub-commission connected with the Exhibition of Gold and Silver Work at Amsterdam (Athenæum, 28 Feb. 1880, p. 289). Through his efforts valuable replicas of famous objects of artistic workmanship were obtained for the national collections at South Kensington and elsewhere.

Around the site of the forum of Roman Cirencester, Cripps excavated remains of the basilica and other buildings. He served in the Royal North Gloucestershire Militia and retired with the rank of Major.

== Personal life ==
He was twice married but left no issue. His first marriage was to Maria Harriet Arabella Daniel-Tyssen (1838–1881) at St Nicholas Church, Brighton on 31 May 1870. Maria was a daughter of Francis Samuel Daniel-Tyssen and sister to Charles Daniel-Tyssen. His second marriage was to Countess Helene von Bismarck-Schierstein (1850–1903) at Ruabon Church, North Wales on 2 December 1884. The Countess was a daughter of Count Friedrich von Bismarck and granddaughter of Sir Henry Williams-Wynn, MP for Midhurst who served as the British Envoy to Denmark.

Cripps died at his residence, Cripps Mead in Cirencester on 26 October 1903.

== Selected publications ==
=== Articles ===
- Notes on Ancient Plate of the Merchant Taylors' Company (privately printed). 1877.
- "English and Foreign Silverwork". Journal of the Society of Arts. 11 May 1883.
- Report on the Plate at Welbeck Abbey. 1883.
- "Church Plate and how to describe it". Transactions of the Bristol & Gloucestershire Archaeological Society. 27 April 1893.
- "Roman basilica of Corinium at Cirencester". Proceedings of the Society of Antiquaries of London. Series 2. 17: 201–208. 1899.
- "Roman Altar and other Sculptured Stones found at Cirencester in April 1899". Proceedings of the Society of Antiquaries of London. Series 2. 18: 177–184. 1899.

=== Books ===
- Old English Plate. London: J. Murray. 1878.; 6th edition. 1899. 10th edition. 1914.
- Old French Plate. London: J. Murray. 1880.; 2nd edition. 1893.
- College and Corporation Plate. South Kensington Museum art handbooks. London: Chapman and Hall. 1881.
