= Giles Estcourt =

English politician (c.1601–1668)

Sir Giles Estcourt, 1st Baronet (c. 1601 – 1668) was an English politician who sat in the House of Commons from 1628 to 1629. He fought for the Royalist cause in the English Civil War.

Escourt was the son of Sir Edward Estcourt of Salisbury. He matriculated at Wadham College, Oxford on 8 May 1618, aged 17, and entered Lincoln's Inn in 1618. He was knighted on 6 December 1622 and created a baronet on 17 March 1627. In 1626, he was of Newnton when he became High Sheriff of Wiltshire.

In 1628, Estcourt was elected Member of Parliament for Cirencester and sat until 1629 when King Charles decided to rule without parliament for eleven years. He fought for the King in the civil war and was taken prisoner after the fall of Bath. He was assessed for a fine of £1000 but neither compounded nor paid the fine.

Estcourt married Anne Nordaunt daughter of Sir Robert Mordaunt, 2nd Baronet of Massingham Parva, Norfolk. He was succeeded in the baronetcy by his son Giles who was killed in duel in Italy. Estcourt's son William then succeeded but when he was killed in a pub brawl the baronetcy became extinct.

Parliament of England
Preceded by Sir Neville Poole; John George	Member of Parliament for Cirencester; 1628–1629; With: John George	Parliament suspended until 1640
Baronetage of England
New creation	Baronet (of Newton); 1627–1650	Succeeded by Giles Estcourt
