= Thomas Strange (MP for Cirencester) =

Member of the Parliament of England

Thomas Strange (died 1594) was the member of Parliament for the English constituency of Cirencester for the parliament of 1572.
