= Theobald Gorges =

English politician

Sir Theobald Gorges (died c. 1647) was an English politician who sat in the House of Commons from 1640 to 1644. He supported the Royalist side in the English Civil War.

Gorges was the son of Sir Thomas Gorges of Langford Wiltshire.

In November 1640, Gorges was elected member of parliament for Cirencester in the Long Parliament. Gorges was knighted in 1641 and supported the King. He was disabled from sitting in parliament in January 1644. He was imprisoned for 14 months and fined £520.

Gorges married firstly to Anne Poole, daughter of Henry Poole of Saperton, and as a widower "aged about 52" married by licence of the Bishop of London to Anne Gage, daughter of John Gage, esq.

Parliament of England
| Preceded by Henry Poole; John George | Member of Parliament for Cirencester; 1640–1644; With: John George | Succeeded by Thomas Fairfax, 3rd Lord Fairfax of Cameron; Nathaniel Rich |
