= Arnold Oldsworth =

Arnold Oldsworth (born c. 1561) was an English lawyer and politician who sat in the House of Commons at various times between 1593 and 1611.

Oldsworth was the eldest son of Edward Oldsworth and his wife Tacy Porter, daughter of Arthur Porter. He was educated under Alexander Nowell, dean of St. Paul's and matriculated at Magdalen Hall, Oxford under date 7 July 1575, aged 17. He was at Thavies Inn and was a student of Lincoln's Inn in 1580. In 1593 he was elected Member of Parliament for Tregoney. He was keeper of the Hanaper in Chancery, and Receiver of the Fines in the King's Bench. In 1604, he was elected MP for Cirencester. He was chosen an Associate to the Bench of Lincoln's Inn on 16 June 1612. He was of Bradley, Gloucestershire and lived in St. Martin's Lane, London. He and his wife had a grant of lands in Brenchley and elsewhere in Kent on 29 March 1616. He was an antiquarian.

Oldsworth married Lucy Barty daughter of Francis Barty, a native of Antwerp. His son Michael was also an MP.

Parliament of England
| Preceded by Richard Penkevill; Christopher Walker | Member of Parliament for Tregoney; 1593; With: John Snowe | Succeeded by Sir Edward Denny; Henry Birde |
| Preceded by Richard Browne; Richard George | Member of Parliament for Cirencester; 1604–1611; With: Richard Martin 1604; Edward Jones 1604–1610; Sir Anthony Manie 1610–1611 | Succeeded by Sir Anthony Manie; Robert Strange |
