= Thomas Watson (bishop of St Davids) =

English clergyman (1637–1717)

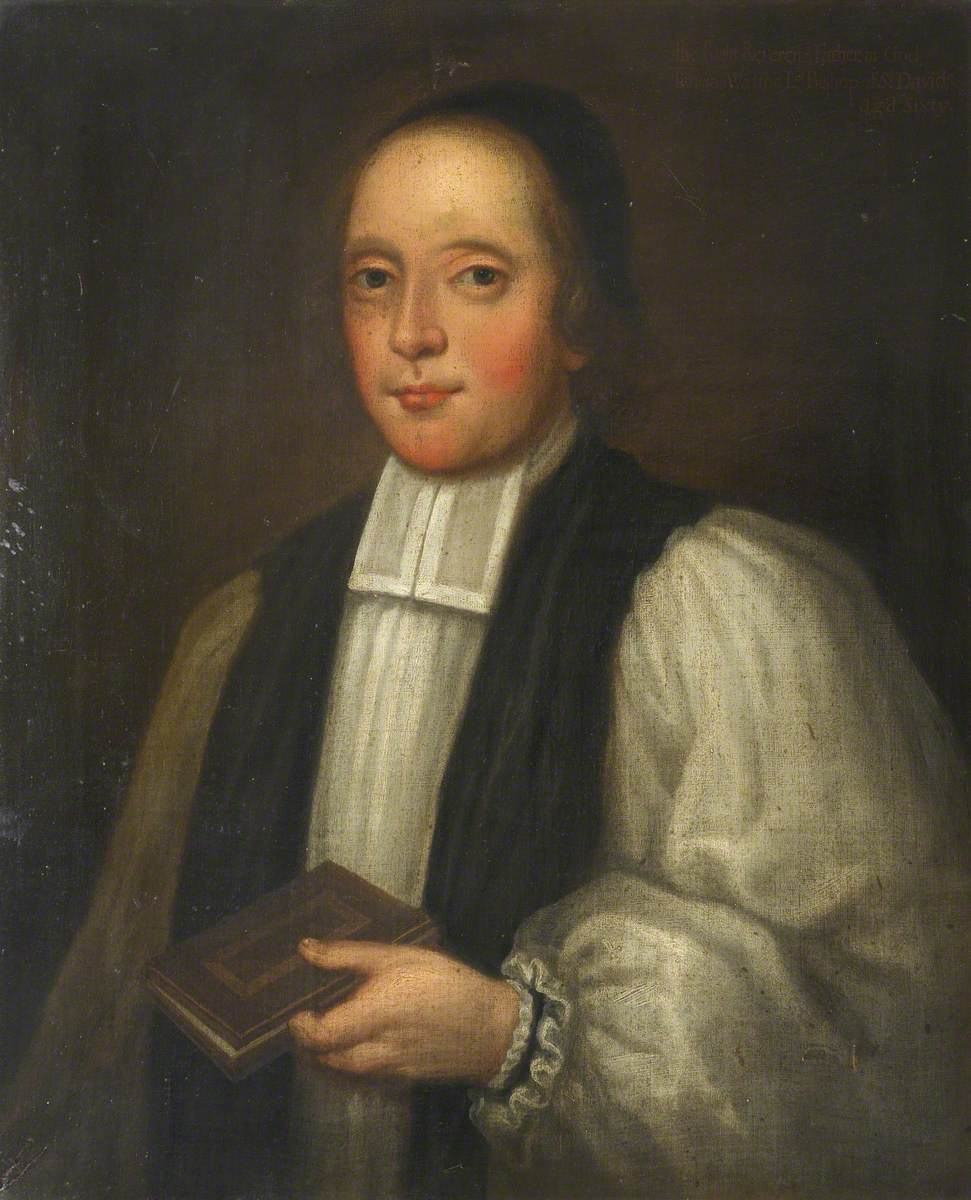
Thomas Watson

Thomas Watson (1 March 1637 – 3 June 1717) was an English Church of England Bishop of St. David's (consecrated 1687; suspended 1694; deprived 1699). A supporter of King James II, he opposed the Revolution of 1688 but was ultimately deprived of his ecclesiastical offices for the offence of simony and jailed for his failure to pay his legal costs. After his release, he reputedly died very rich.

== Life ==
Watson was born in Hull, the son of a seaman. He was educated in Hull before going to St John's College, Cambridge as a sizar. He graduated BA in 1658/9, MA in 1662 and BD in 1669. Ordained in 1667, he became a Fellow of St John's in 1669 and Rector of Borough Green, Cambridgeshire in 1672.

He retired to live as lord of the manor in Wilbraham and died on 3 June 1717. He was buried by night in Wilbraham.

== Bibliography ==
- Handley, S. (2004) "Watson, Thomas (1637–1717)", Oxford Dictionary of National Biography, Oxford University Press, Retrieved 21 Aug 2007 (subscription required)

Church of England titles
Preceded by John Lloyd	Bishop of St David's; 1687–1699	Succeeded by vacancy to 1705; George Bull
