= William Estcourt =

16th-century English politician

William Estcourt was the member of Parliament for the constituency of Cirencester for the parliament of 1584.
