= Richard Master =

British doctor

Richard Masters

President of the Royal College of Physicians
- In office 1561–1561

Personal details
- Born: Willesborough, Kent
- Died: 1588 Silver Street, London
- Resting place: St Olave's Church, Silver Street
- Spouse: Elizabeth Fulnetby
- Education: All Souls' College University of Oxford
- Profession: Physician

Richard Masters (also Master, Mastre or Maistres) was a leading 16th-century English physician and personal doctor of Queen Elizabeth.

== Early life ==
Masters was the son of Robert Masters of Streetend in Willesborough, Kent. He became a fellow at All Souls' College in Oxford, eventually graduating with a B.A. in 1533 and an M.A. in 1537.

He was a personal acquaintance of Rudolph Walther and in 1539 accepted a benefice from the Church of England, however, he forfeited it believing he was not a good clergyman.

== Medical career ==
Masters enrolled at the University of Oxford to study medicine, and by 1545 was an admitted M.B. and granted a licence to practise medicine. In 1553 he became a fellow at the College of Physicians and served as a censor between 1556 and 1558 and in 1560. In 1561 he served as President of the college, and as consiliarius in 1564 and 1583.

=== Queen Elizabeth ===
In 1559, Master was granted a patent of £100 annually to serve as the personal physician to Queen Elizabeth.

In 1568, Elizabeth granted Master a coat of arms and properties formerly in the possession of the Abbey of Cirencester.

=== Boleyn cup ===
Queen Elizabeth gave Master a silver cup topped with the falcon badge of her mother Anne Boleyn. The cup is known as the "Boleyn cup" and was given to the parish church of Cirencester. It has London hallmarks for 1535.

== Prebendary of York ==
In 1562, Masters was made Prebendary of York, and in 1565 issued a royal patent for his family and heirs from the Queen receiving the Cirencester Abbey.

== Marriage and family ==
Masters married Elizabeth, daughter of John Fulnetby, Esq. and had seven sons, including:

- George (c. 1556 – c. 1604), M.P. for Cirencester in 1586 and 1589
- Henry (christened 5 March 1564), Principal of St Alban Hall, Oxford 1603–1614 and godson of Queen Elizabeth
- Thomas (died 1628), Archdeacon of Salop 1613–1628
- Robert Master, Chancellor of Rochester and Lichfield; M.P. for Cricklade in 1601

Masters died in 1588.
