= Thomas Poole (MP) =

Member of the Parliament of England

Thomas Poole or Powle was the member of Parliament for the constituency of Cirencester for the parliaments of 1571 and 1572.
