= James Livingston, 1st Earl of Newburgh =

Scottish peer (c. 1622 – 1670)

James Livingston, 1st Earl of Newburgh (c. 1622 – 4 December 1670) was a Scottish peer who sat in the House of Commons of England from 1661 to 1670. He supported the Royalist cause in the English Civil War.

Livingston was the only son of Sir John Livingstone of Kinnaird and his wife Jane Sproxton, daughter of Richard Sproxton of Wakefield, Yorkshire. His father was a page of the bedchamber to James VI and I. He succeeded his father as 2nd Baronet in 1628. He matriculated at Merton College, Oxford on 17 December 1638, aged 16 and travelled abroad in France from about 1642 to 1646.

When he joined King Charles at Newcastle in 1646, he was created Viscount of Newburgh in the Peerage of Scotland. He and his wife made plans in December 1648 to rescue the King before his trial but nothing came of it and they fled to the Netherlands. In 1650, he went with Charles II to Scotland, subscribed to the Covenant, and took his seat in the Scottish House of Lords. He was a lieutenant colonel in the Life Guards at the Battle of Worcester and after the battle he fled abroad again where he spent his time duelling and corresponding with the Scottish Royalists. From 1656 to 1658, he was a colonel of horse in the Spanish army and commanded a Scottish Royalist regiment which fought at the Battle of the Dunes (1658).

After the Restoration, Livingston was captain of the bodyguard in Scotland and was created Earl of Newburgh, Viscount of Kynnaird and Lord Livingston. He became lord of the manor of Cirencester in 1660 through his second marriage. In 1661 he was elected Member of Parliament for Cirencester in the Cavalier Parliament. He was awarded MA at Oxford on 9 September 1661.

Livingston died at the age of about 48 and was buried at St. Margaret's, Westminster.

Livingston married firstly before 1648 Katherine Stuart, widow of George, 9th Seigneur d'Aubigny and daughter of Theophilus Howard, 2nd Earl of Suffolk. They had one daughter, Elizabeth (1648–1717), who was brought up in England by his sister Dorothy Livingston, the wife of Sir Charles Stanhope, and married Robert Delaval. She is known for her journal and moral reflections. She was also a Jacobite agent.

Livingston married secondly around May 1660, Anne Poole daughter of Sir Henry Poole of Sapperton, Gloucestershire. He was succeeded by his only son Charles.

== See also ==
- Cromwell's Act of Grace

Parliament of England
Preceded by Thomas Master; Henry Powle	Member of Parliament for Cirencester; 1661–1670; With: John George	Succeeded by Henry Powle; John George
Baronetage of Nova Scotia
Preceded by John Livingston	Baronet (of Kinnaird); 1628–1670	Succeeded by Charles Livingston
Peerage of Scotland
New creation	Earl of Newburgh; 1660–1670	Succeeded by Charles Livingston
New creation	Viscount of Newburgh; 1647–1670	Succeeded by Charles Livingston
