= 1878 Cirencester by-election =

UK Parliamentary by-election

The 1878 Cirencester by-election was held on 12 March 1878. The by-election was fought due to the succession to a peerage of the incumbent Conservative MP, Allen Bathurst who became the sixth Earl Bathurst. It was won by the Conservative candidate Thomas William Chester-Master.

Cirencester by-election, 1878
Party	Candidate	Votes	%	±%
Conservative	Thomas William Chester-Master	698	66.8	N/A
Liberal	Mr. Ponsonby	347	33.2	New
Majority		351	33.6	N/A
Turnout		1,045	92.6	N/A
Conservative hold		Swing		
