= Richard St George (disambiguation) =

Richard St George (c.1550–1635) was an English officer of arms.

Richard St George may also refer to:

- Richard St George (died 1726) (1657–1726), Irish landowner
- Richard St George Mansergh-St George (1757–1798), British Army officer

== See also ==
- Richard George (disambiguation)
