= Maalim Ibrahim =

Somali captain and navigator

- Born: Mogadishu, Sultanate of Mogadishu
- Occupation: Navigator
- Years active: 17th century
- Known for: Maritime expertise

Maalim Ibrahim was a 17th-century Somali captain and navigator who was considered an expert in the medieval maritime trade routes of the Indian Ocean region between Mogadishu and the city of Cambay in the Gujarat Sultanate of India.

== Background ==
Maalim was born in the Sultanate of Mogadishu, whose capital at the time was the richest city on the Eastern African coast. In 1615, on the return leg of a trade voyage to Madagascar, Maalim docked at one of the Islands of the Comoros and encountered the English explorer Thomas Roe, who during their encounter noted Maalim's fluency of the Portuguese language.

== Influence on English cartography ==
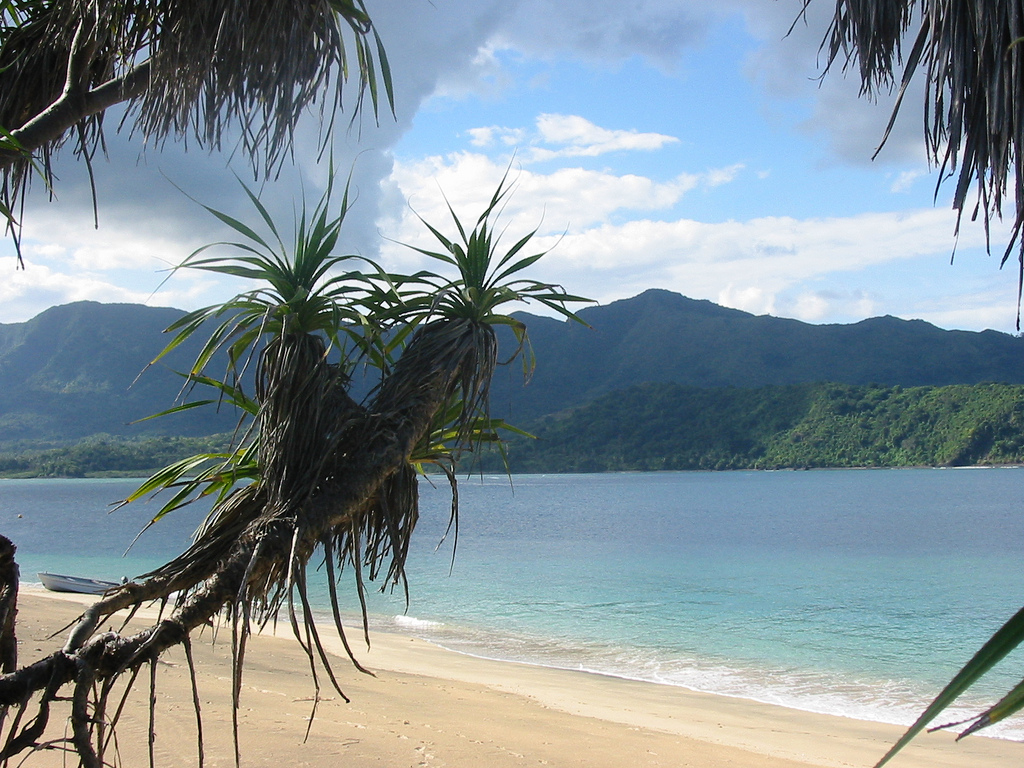
Maalim Ibrahim and Thomas Roe met at the Island of Mohéli.

Roe provided Maalim with a nautical map of the region, and was intrigued when the Somali captain pointed out numerous cartographic errors in his map, and then revealed his own, which Roe summarised as a “graduated map of high quality” drawn on parchment and subsequently began adjusting his own map based on that of Maalim.

== Family ==
His brother was also a sailor and a mercenary that had participated at the naval Battle of Swally between the English and the Portuguese, on the side of the latter, off the coast of the Indian subcontinent.

== See also ==
- Sultanate of Mogadishu
- Maritime history of Somalia
- Abd al-Aziz of Mogadishu
