= Edward Jones (English politician) =

Edward Jones (died 1609) was an English politician who sat in the House of Commons at various times between 1593 and 1609.

Jones was admitted to Gray's Inn on 12 January 1588. In 1593, he was elected Member of Parliament for Grampound. He was elected MP for Penryn in 1597. In 1601 he was elected MP for Portsmouth. He became MP for Cirencester in 1604 after the elected member chose another seat and sat until his death in 1609.

Parliament of England
| Preceded by Thomas Cromwell; Richard Sayer | Member of Parliament for Grampound; 1593; With: Richard Edgcumbe | Succeeded by Sir John Leigh; Robert Newdigate |
| Preceded by John Osborne; Edward Philips | Member of Parliament for Penryn; 1597; With: John Killigrew | Succeeded by Edward Seymour; Richard Messenger |
| Preceded by William Greene; Thomas Thorney | Member of Parliament for Portsmouth; 1601; With: John Moore | Succeeded by Sir Oliver St John; Sir Richard Jenvoy |
| Preceded by Arnold Oldsworth; Richard Martin 1604 | Member of Parliament for Cirencester; 1604–1609; With: Arnold Oldsworth | Succeeded by Arnold Oldsworth; Sir Anthony Manie |
