= Anthony Mayney =

English politician (1572–1627)

Sir Anthony Mayney or Manie (1572 – 20 February 1627) was an English politician who sat in the House of Commons at various times between 1610 and 1624.

Mayney was the son of John Maney of Biddenham, Kent. He was knighted on 23 July 1609. In 1610, he was elected Member of Parliament for Cirencester in a by-election. He was re-elected MP for Cirencester in 1614; he was also elected for St. Ives, but chose to sit in Cirencester. In 1624 he was elected MP for Midhurst.

Mayney's son, John Mayney, fought on the Royalist side in the English Civil War, and was created a baronet in 1641.

Parliament of England
Preceded by Arnold Oldsworth; Edward Jones	Member of Parliament for Cirencester; 1610–1614; With: Arnold Oldsworth; Robert Strange 1614	Succeeded by Sir Thomas Roe; Thomas Nicholas
Preceded by Richard Lewknor; John Smith	Member of Parliament for Midhurst; 1624; With: Richard Lewknor	Succeeded by Richard Lewknor; Samuel Owfield
