= 1892 Cirencester by-election =

Parliamentary election in England

- 18 October 1892

Cirencester constituency
- Turnout: 8,551; 84.7% (▲2.9 pp)
Candidate	Thomas Chester-Master	Harry Levy-Lawson
Party	Conservative	Liberal
Popular vote	4,227	4,227
Percentage	50.0%	50.0%
MP before election
Arthur Winterbotham
Elected MP
Election results annulled

A by-election for the United Kingdom parliamentary constituency of Cirencester was held on 18 October 1892 following the retirement of the incumbent Liberal MP Arthur Brend Winterbotham. The seat was gained by the Conservative candidate Thomas Chester-Master. Chester-Master was originally declared the victor by 3 votes, but on petition and after scrutiny, the votes were declared equal and a new election was held.

Cirencester by-election, 1892
Party	Candidate	Votes	%	±%
Conservative	Thomas Chester-Master	4,277	50.0	−0.9
Liberal	Harry Levy-Lawson	4,274	50.0	+0.9
Majority		3	0.0	N/A
Turnout		8,551	84.7	+2.9
Conservative gain from Liberal		Swing		
