= Abbey House, Cirencester =

Abbey House
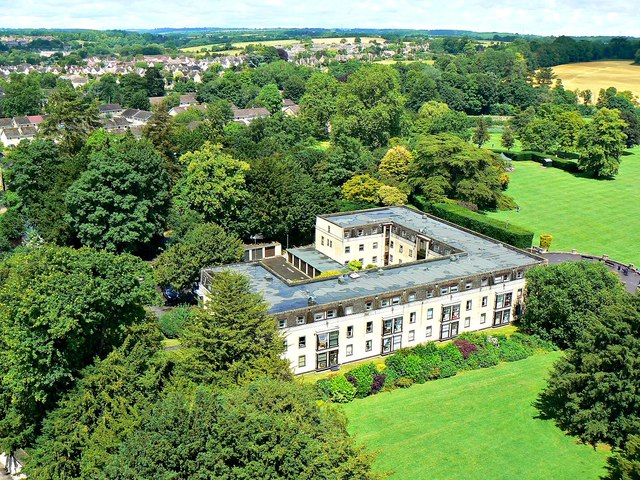
- The flats on the site of Abbey House

- Location in Gloucestershire
- 51°43′6″N 1°58′04″W
- Location: Gloucestershire, England

Abbey House was a country house in the English county of Gloucestershire that developed on the site of the former Cirencester Abbey following the dissolution and demolition of the abbey at the Reformation in the 1530s. The site of the dissolved abbey of Cirencester was granted in 1564 to Richard Master, physician to Queen Elizabeth I. Dr. Master died in 1588, and it was probably either his son, George, or more probably his grandson, Sir William Master, who demolished the old monastery buildings and constructed the house depicted in an engraving of c.1710 by Jan Kip. This early 17th-century house was five bays square, with a projecting three-storey porch and two bay windows on the entrance front facing Dollar Street. Nothing is known of the internal planning of the house, which is regrettable since this was clearly one of several Gloucestershire houses in which the traditional layout of a central hall with office and family wings was abandoned. The square ground plan adopted at the Abbey House made symmetrical external treatment easier, but caused difficulties with lighting and roofing, which seem not to have been happily resolved here, since Kip shows that internal gulleys were needed to dispose of the water from the roof.

The Master family occupied the Abbey House throughout the 17th and 18th centuries, and played an active part in the life of the town. Four consecutive generations represented Cirencester in Parliament between 1624 and 1747, and Sir William Master was on several occasions the unwilling host of members of the royal family during the Civil War. Although the house seems to have avoided damage in the siege of Cirencester, the Master family estates were sequestered, and Sir William, who had 12 children, was said to be in financial difficulties in 1652.

The Jacobean Abbey House survived until the 1770s, when according to some accounts, it was damaged by fire. Between 1774 and 1776 Thomas Master had it taken down and replaced by a new house, which was also square and apparently stood on the old foundations, although it faced in the opposite direction, out across the newly landscaped park. A plan of 1774 already shows both the block plan of the new house and the new layout of the grounds, although it is unclear what had actually been accomplished by this date. Brewer says that the old house "was taken down about 1776... and the present building was shortly after erected on the same site". The new house was designed by William Donn, a minor London architect, who was paid £40 for the plans but who apparently did not supervise the work. As Donn claimed to have worked under Capability Brown, he may also have been responsible for the landscaping, but there is no direct evidence for this.

The new house was a five-by-five bay block, of three storeys, with a semicircular bow on the entrance front and a platband above the first-floor windows. It was built of rubble stone with crude ashlar quoins and window surrounds, and was probably stuccoed until the mid-19th century. The original internal arrangement consisted of a D-shaped entrance hall behind the bow, with a small staircase hall behind and a large rectangular room to either side. That on the south was a dining room with a screen of columns across one end; that to the north a drawing room. Across the back of the house were the library, service stairs and Thomas Master's dressing room.

Between 1817 and 1825 the ground floor of the bow was extended in Greek Revival style to create a much larger semicircular lobby. The new doors and windows were framed by fluted baseless Doric columns in antis and divided by short sections of wall with incised panels. Internal changes were perhaps made to other parts of the house at the same time, although Victorian alterations superseded any Grecian decoration. Thomas Master died in 1823, and the Abbey estate passed to his spinster daughter, Jane, who died in August 1862, when it passed to her sister Mary Ann, Dowager Lady Carteret. Either William Chester-Master or his son, Thomas William Chester-Master, who inherited in 1868, was probably responsible for a major enlargement or rebuilding of the service wing at the rear of the house. Photographs show this to have been built of coursed rubble stone, and the stucco on the house was probably removed when this addition was made. Rather later in the century, bay windows were added to the dining room and library and part of the service wing was reconstructed as a single-storey block with a low balustrade, matching those placed over the Victorian bay windows.

By 1897 the house was let, and it remained in the occupation of tenants until shortly after the Second World War. It then lay empty and deteriorating for over a decade while extensive attempts were made to find a new tenant, but it was finally demolished in 1964. Flats for the elderly were then built on the site, and the grounds were presented to the town as a public park by Mr R.G. Chester-Master in 1965. The agricultural part of the estate remains the property of the Chester-Master family.
