= Arthur Winterbotham (cricketer) =

English cricketer

Arthur Strachan Winterbotham (28 June 1864 – 15 June 1936) was an English cricketer who played for the Marylebone Cricket Club between 1881 and 1886, and appeared in three first-class cricket matches for Gloucestershire in 1885. A right-handed batsman and occasional right-arm slow bowler whose father Arthur Winterbotham was a Liberal Party politician, Winterbotham scored 52 runs in total, and bowled without taking a wicket. Born in Dursley, he died in Stonehouse, Gloucestershire, aged 71.
