= Neville Poole =

English politician

Sir Neville Poole (died 1661) was an English politician who sat in the House of Commons variously between 1614 and 1648. He supported the Parliamentarian side in the English Civil War.

Poole was the son of Sir Henry Poole of Cirencester and Oaksey and his wife Griselda Neville, daughter of Edward Nevill, 7th Baron Bergavenny. He entered Gray's Inn on 17 February 1611 and was knighted at Newmarket in January 1613.

In 1614, Poole was elected Member of Parliament for Malmesbury and was elected MP for Cricklade in 1624. He was elected MP for Cirencester in 1626. In 1636 he was High Sheriff of Wiltshire.

In April 1640, he was elected MP for Malmesbury again in the Short Parliament. He was re-elected in November 1640 for the Long Parliament and sat until he was excluded under Pride's Purge in 1648. He was Deputy Lieutenant for Wiltshire and raised a regiment for parliament in 1642. He was involved in a parley at Marlborough in 1642 when he saw off the Royalist forces under Lord Digby prior to the Siege of Marlborough. In April 1643 he became a commissioner for sequestration.

Poole was of Oaksey or Oxsey, Wiltshire, and was lord of the manor on South Cerney until he sold it to Sir Edward Atkyns.

Poole married Frances Poole, daughter of Sir Henry Poole of Saperton and sister of Henry Poole. His son Edward Poole was also an MP in the Long Parliament and later at Malmesbury.

Parliament of England
Preceded by Sir Roger Dallyson; Sir Thomas Dallyson	Member of Parliament for Malmesbury; 1614; With: Sir Roger Dallyson	Succeeded by Sir Henry Poole; Sir Edward Wardour
Preceded by Sir Thomas Howard; Sir Carew Reynell	Member of Parliament for Cricklade; 1624; With: Sir William Howard	Succeeded by Sir William Howard; Edward Dowse
Preceded by Sir Miles Sandys; Henry Poole	Member of Parliament for Cirencester; 1626; With: John George	Succeeded by Sir Giles Estcourt; John George
Vacant Parliament suspended since 1629	Member of Parliament for Malmesbury; 1640–1648; With: Anthony Hungerford 1640–1644; Sir John Danvers	Succeeded by Sir John Danvers
