= Arthur Winterbotham =

English cloth manufacturer and politician

Arthur Brend Winterbotham (19 April 1838 – 8 September 1892) was an English cloth manufacturer, and Liberal and Liberal Unionist politician.

Winterbotham was the son of Lindsey Winterbotham and Sarah Ann née Page. His father was a banker of Stroud, Gloucestershire. He was educated at Amersham School and later moved to Cam, Gloucestershire, to partner with the woollen cloth manufacturer Thomas Hunt in Cam Mill (previously known as Corrietts Mill), forming in 1887 the firm Hunt & Winterbotham, which, at Winterbotham's direction, sold its goods directly to tailors. It merged in 1976 with two other such manufacturers, Hardy Minnis and Martin Sons & Co, to create Huddersfield Fine Worsteds, still a prominent manufacturer of fine textiles.

Winterbotham built a house at Norman Hill, Dursley, Gloucestershire. In 1885, he was elected Member of Parliament (MP) for Cirencester. He held the seat until his death in 1892 aged 54.

Winterbotham married Elizabeth Strachan in 1863 and had two sons, Arthur and Herbert. His brother Henry Selfe Page Winterbotham was also a Member of Parliament.

Parliament of the United Kingdom
Preceded by Thomas Chester-Master	Member of Parliament for Cirencester; 1885 – 1892	Succeeded by Thomas Chester-Master
