= Gabriel Blike =

16th-century English politician

Gabriel Blike (c. 1520 – c. 1592) was an English politician and adherent of the Dudley family.

== Life ==
He was the son of Peter Blike of Astley, Shropshire and his wife Mary. He was associated with the Dudleys by 1555, when he acted as executor to Jane Dudley, Duchess of Northumberland.

It was through the influence of Robert Dudley, 1st Earl of Leicester the Blike was selected to represent Cirencester in the parliament of 1571. He was a justice of the peace for Gloucestershire from 1573. He became a principal burgess of Tewkesbury in 1574 around the time Leicester obtained a charter for the town and subsequently served as under-steward to the earl. In a later Star Chamber case it was alleged that John Bullingham owed his position as Bishop of Gloucester in 1581 to Blike's promotion of him to Leicester as a candidate and that Bullingham subsequently paid him an annuity as a reward. He appears to have also been keeper of Cornbury Park, Oxfordshire in the 1580s.

A grant of administration was granted to his widow in March 1592.

== Family ==
He married Mary, daughter of Sir Rowland Morton of Twyning, Gloucestershire and his second wife Sibill. Their only daughter Sibill married Francis, son of Simon Clare of Ludlow in 1572 and died three years later from the complications of childbirth.
