= James Wroughton =

16th-century English politician

James Wroughton was the member of the English Parliament for the constituency of Cirencester for the parliament of 1597.
