= George Master =

Member of the Parliament of England

George Master (c. 1556 – will proven 1604) was the member of Parliament for the constituency of Cirencester for the parliaments of 1586 and 1589.
