= Charles Daniel-Tyssen =

English cricketer and clergyman

Personal information
- Full name: Charles Amherst Daniel Tyssen
- Born: 11 December 1856; Sandgate, Kent, England
- Died: 26 December 1940 (aged 84); Sandgate, Kent, England
- Batting: Unknown

Career statistics
Competition	First-class
Matches	1
Runs scored	2
Batting average	1.00
100s/50s	–/–
Top score	2
Catches/stumpings	2/–
- Source: Cricinfo, 9 August 2019

Charles Amherst Daniel-Tyssen (11 December 1856 – 26 December 1940) was an English first-class cricketer and clergyman.

== Early life ==
The son of Francis Samuel Daniel-Tyssen (1813–1875) and his wife, Eliza Julia Knight-Bruce, he was born in December 1856 at Sandgate, Kent. Among his siblings were Ellen Blanche Daniel-Tyssen (wife of William W. P. Fletcher) and Maria Harriet Arabella Daniel-Tyssen (first wife of Wilfred Joseph Cripps).

His paternal grandparents were William George Daniel-Tyssen, High Sheriff of Norfolk, and Amelia (née Amherst) Daniel-Tyssen. His first cousin was William Tyssen-Amherst, 1st Baron Amherst of Hackney. His maternal grandparents were of Sir James Knight-Bruce and Eliza Mountford (née Newte) Knight-Bruce.

He was educated firstly at Tonbridge School in 1869 to 1870, before attending Harrow School. From Harrow he studied at Merton College, Oxford.

=== Cricket career ===
While studying at Oxford, Daniel-Tyssen made a single appearance in first-class cricket for the Gentlemen of England against Oxford University at Oxford in 1877. Batting twice in the match, he was dismissed for 2 runs in the Gentlemen of England first-innings by Frederick Jellicoe, while in their second-innings he was dismissed without scoring by Arthur Heath.

== Career ==
After graduating from Oxford in 1880, he became an Anglican clergyman. He was the curate of Highweek in Devon from 1880–83, before changing denomination and joining the Catholic Church in 1883. He took up a teaching position at St Edmund's College, Ware in 1883, before serving with the South Africa Company in Bechuanaland in 1891. He later returned to the Anglican church.

== Personal life ==
He died at Sandgate on Christmas Day in 1940.
