= Thomas Chester-Master (1815–1899) =

British member of Parliament

Thomas William Chester-Master, senior (25 May 1815 – 31 January 1899) was an English businessman.

Thomas was the eldest son of Colonel William Chester-Master by Isabella-Margaret, daughter of Colonel the Hon. Stephen Digby.

He married in 1840, the daughter of Sir George Cornewall, baronet, MP, of Moccas Court, Herefordshire. His family had originally settled in Kent during the English civil wars. But moved to the Three Counties, and held lands in Gloucestershire and Herefordshire, including the ancient medieval Abbey of Gloucester. Lord Seymour, the Marquess of Hertford, had been declared a traitor by bill of Attainder, rendered forfeit his vast estates and titles by Queen Elizabeth I's parliament. The Master family acquired the estates in 1864.

Master was a traditional Conservative MP of conventional 'strictly conservative' opinions. He was returned as MP for Cirencester in 1837, considered an unreformed wool town quite unaffected by the Great Reform Act 1832. However he was unhappy in parliament and accepted the Chiltern Hundreds in July 1844. In London he lived at 32a Mount Street, and was a member of the Carlton Club.

A successful businessman he purchased Knole Park, on the Downs near Bristol. His son, Thomas, junior was also an MP.

Parliament of the United Kingdom
Preceded by Lord Edward Somerset; Joseph Cripps	Member of Parliament for Cirencester; 1837–1844; With: Joseph Cripps to 1841; William Cripps from 1841	Succeeded by William Cripps; Viscount Villiers
