= William Master (author) =

English divine and writer

William Master (1627–1684) was an English divine and writer. He was the son of the politician Sir William Master and the brother of John Master.

== Life ==
He was the second son of Sir William Master, knt., of Cirencester, Gloucestershire, and of his wife Alice, daughter of Edward Eastcourt of Salisbury. He was born at Cirencester, and baptised on 7 September 1627. He matriculated at Christ Church, Oxford, on 2 April 1647, graduated B.A. on 7 November 1650, by order of the parliamentary visitors of the university, was admitted bachelor-fellow of Merton College in 1651, and was M.A. on 19 November 1652. Soon after he became vicar of Preston, Cotswold, where his father was patron; while there, on Ascension day 1658, he performed the ceremony of marriage between George Bull and Bridget, daughter of Alexander Gregory, incumbent of Cirencester, according to the form prescribed in the Book of Common Prayer, although that usage was forbidden under penalty at the time.

Master was admitted rector of Woodford, Essex on 13 February 1661, was prebendary of Chamberlainwood in St Paul's Cathedral from 17 July 1663 till 1666, and was admitted to that of Cadington Major on 14 February 1667. For a year, from 3 July 1666, he was rector of Southchurch, Essex, and from 29 April 1671 till his death rector of St Vedast, Foster Lane, London, with the church of St Michael Quern.

Master died in London, and was buried in the chancel of Woodford Church on 6 September 1684.

== Works ==
Under the pseudonym of "A Student in Theologie" Master published Λόγος Εὔκαιροι, Essayes and Observations, Theologicall and Morall. Wherein many of the Humours and Diseases of the Age are Discovered, to which was added Drops of Myrrhe, or Meditations and Prayers, fitted to Divers of the preceding Arguments, London, 1654. Morality is combined with an easy style.

== Family ==
Master married at Woodford, on 18 May 1665, Susanna, daughter of the Rev. Job Yate, rector of Rodmarton in Gloucestershire. At the time of his death his three children, Richard, Thomas, and Elizabeth, were all under age. He left landed property in Essex, in Wiltshire, and at Preston, near Cirencester. His grandson William, son of his eldest son Richard, baptised in December 1715, was educated at Winchester College, and became fellow of New College, Oxford, in 1736.
