= Joseph Cripps =

English cloth manufacturer, banker, and politician (1765–1847)

Member of the British Parliament for Cirencester
- In office 1806–1812
- Preceded by: Robert Preston
- Succeeded by: William Cripps
- In office 1818–1841

Personal details
- Born: 10 March 1765 Cirencester, Gloucestershire, England
- Died: 8 January 1847 Ashcroft, near Cirencester, Gloucestershire
- Resting place: St. Catherine’s Chapel, Church of St John the Baptist, Cirencester
- Party: Tory → Conservative
- Spouses: Elizabeth Harrison (m. 1786; d. 1799); Dorothea Harrison (m. 1801)
- Children: At least eight (including William Cripps)
- Relatives: See below
- Occupation: Cloth manufacturer, banker, brewer, politician

Joseph Cripps (10 March 1765 – 8 January 1847) was a prominent English cloth manufacturer, banker, brewer, and long-serving Member of Parliament for Cirencester. Despite his Tory affiliation, he was known for independent-mindedness and support of moderate reform. He also served as governor of the Van Diemen's Land Company and was described at his death as leaving an “enormous” fortune.

== Early life and business ==
Cripps was born in Cirencester, Gloucestershire, the son of Joseph Cripps, a cloth manufacturer, and his wife Hester (née Hall). He inherited his father’s manufactory, acquired a second mill, and diversified into brewing and banking. His mills also made use of workhouse labour in the early 19th century.

== Civic and colonial roles ==
He was active in local affairs, serving as captain of the Cirencester Volunteers in 1798 and rising to lieutenant colonel commanding the corps by 1803. In 1792 he was also appointed commissioner of the Court of Requests for the Seven Hundreds of Cirencester.

From 1825 he was a director of the Van Diemen’s Land Company, becoming deputy governor in 1829 and governor from about 1838 to 1842. The schooner Joseph Cripps sailed between Hobart, Launceston, and Port Adelaide in the 1840s.

== Parliamentary career ==
Cripps was elected MP for Cirencester in 1806, reflecting demands for a local representative rather than London merchant Robert Preston. Narrowly defeated in 1812, he returned unopposed in 1818 and held the seat until 1841, when his son William succeeded him. Though a Tory, he often supported moderate reforms.

== Family ==
Cripps married Elizabeth Harrison in 1786. They had five children before her death in 1799. In 1801 he married her sister Dorothea Harrison, and they had eight more children.

He died in January 1847 at Ashcroft, near Cirencester, and was buried in the family vault at St. Catherine’s Chapel in the Church of St. John the Baptist, Cirencester.

== Legacy ==
Cripps’s obituary in the Law Times noted his “enormous” fortune, the product of extensive commercial, banking, and political activity. He is regarded as the progenitor of numerous notable descendants:

- His son, William Cripps (MP), was MP for Cirencester and a Junior Lord of the Treasury under Sir Robert Peel.
- His grandson William Harrison Cripps (1850-1923), a prominent surgeon
- His grandson Charles Cripps, 1st Baron Parmoor (1852-1941), politician
- His grandson Wilfred Joseph Cripps (1841-1903), antiquarian and expert on antique silver plate
- His grandson John Matthew Cripps (1823–1892), Major-General in the Bengal Staff Corps, recorded his campaigns in the memoir Recollections of My Indian Career (Reading, 1888).
