= Diet of Regensburg (1630) =

The Diet of Regensburg was a meeting of the Prince-Electors of the Holy Roman Empire (or Kurfürstentag) which occurred at Regensburg from July to November 1630. It resulted in a major loss of power for the Holy Roman Emperor Ferdinand II.

== Context ==
The Thirty Years' War had prevented any Imperial Diet (German Reichstag) from being summoned for thirty years: the last one before the war had been that of 1613. In 1623, the Emperor had summoned and dominated a Diet of the Princes at Regensburg. The rest of the states' corporate representation had been done on occasional days at the Imperial Circle and at the Electors' Diets of 1619, 1627, and 1630.

The Diet of 1630 was preceded by Ferdinand's Edict of Restitution and the Peace of Lübeck after General Wallenstein's defeat of Denmark. These both put the Emperor in a favourable position to succeed in achieving his goals.

== Representatives ==
The Diet of the Electors met at Regensburg in June, 1630.

The Catholic Electors were present in person, whilst those of Saxony and Brandenburg were represented by ambassadors.

The Emperor, the Empress, their eldest son, and two daughters made their entry into the city on the 19th of June. Representatives of Frederick V, Elector Palatine, the English ambassador Sir Robert Anstruther, two French ambassadors, and the Papal Nuncio came afterwards, while Spain was represented by the Duke of Tursi and James Bruneau.

Anselm Casimir Wambold von Umstadt was invited as Imperial Chancellor (Reichserzkanzler) and Bishop-Elector of Mainz.

== Course and results ==
The meeting was opened by Ferdinand himself on the 3rd of July 1630 .

Ferdinand's chief aim was to have his son Ferdinand the Younger elected King of the Romans and to gain the Empire's military support against the Dutch Republic in the Thirty Years' War, as well as against France in the War of the Mantuan Succession. He also needed to deal with the imminent Swedish threat - on 6 July, shortly after the Diet had opened, Gustavus Adolphus of Sweden had landed in Pomerania

Maximilian I of Bavaria feared the rising power of the empire and the strength of Wallenstein's Imperial Army. The Catholic electors therefore opposed rather than supported Ferdinand, requiring that the imperial army be downsized, the war-taxes reduced and Wallenstein dismissed from command. Ferdinand largely had to concede these demands so as not to lose his political underpinning in the empire. Wallenstein was dismissed and Johann Tserclaes, Count of Tilly put in supreme command of imperial forces, which were shrunk despite the Swedish threat. The debate on Mantua forced Ferdinand into a peace treaty which France soon broke. The Electors blocked Ferdinand the Younger's election as King of the Romans and in the name of their own freedom revoked the Edict of Restitution.

The Diet thus saw Ferdinand - previously at the height of his power - suffer his first defeat by the Imperial States, a defeat that was near-complete.

The imperial astronomer Johannes Kepler, who was also employed as personal mathematician to Wallenstein, visited the Diet of Regensburg in November 1630 in an attempt to resolve his own position, but contracted a fatal illness and died on November 15. Emperor Ferdinand departed the city during Kepler's illness but sent some of his men with a donation to aid in his recovery.
