= Henry Williams-Wynn =

British politician and diplomat (1783–1856)

The Right Honourable Sir Henry Williams-Wynn KCB GCH
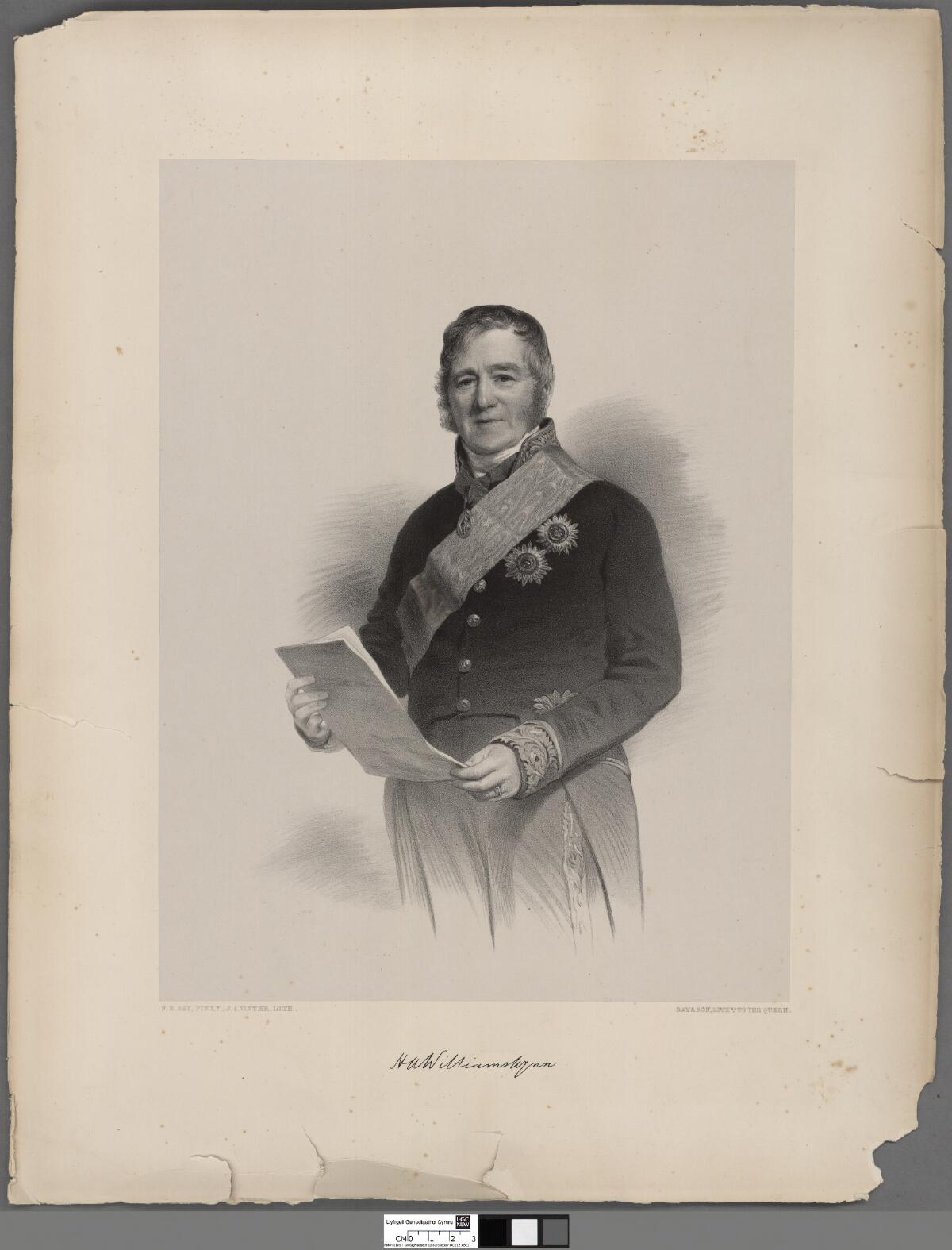

British Envoy to Denmark
- In office 1824–1853
- Preceded by: Augustus John Foster
- Succeeded by: The Earl of Sheffield

Member of Parliament for Midhurst
- In office January 1807 – May 1807 Serving with William Conyngham Plunket
- Preceded by: John Smith; William Wickham
- Succeeded by: Samuel Smith; James Abercromby

Personal details
- Born: Henry Watkin Williams-Wynn; 16 March 1783
- Died: 28 March 1859 (aged 76)
- Spouse: Hon. Hester Frances Smith (m. 1813)
- Children: 6
- Parent(s): Sir Watkin Williams-Wynn, 4th Baronet; Charlotte Grenville
- Relatives: George Grenville (grandfather)

Sir Henry Watkin Williams-Wynn KCB GCH (16 March 1783 – 28 March 1856) was a British MP in the early 19th century. From 1824 to 1853, he served as the British Envoy to Denmark.

== Early life ==
He was the younger son of eight children, six of whom survived to adulthood, of Sir Watkin Williams-Wynn, 4th Baronet, and, his second wife, Charlotte Grenville. Among his siblings was elder brothers Sir Watkin Williams-Wynn, 5th Baronet (who married Lady Henrietta Clive, a daughter of Edward Clive, 1st Earl of Powis) and Charles Williams-Wynn, Secretary at War and Chancellor of the Duchy of Lancaster (who married Mary Cunliffe, daughter of Sir Foster Cunliffe, 3rd Baronet). His sister Henrietta Elizabeth Williams-Wynn, married Thomas Cholmondeley, 1st Baron Delamere.

His father was the only son of Sir Watkin Williams-Wynn, 3rd Baronet and his second wife, Frances Shackerley of Cheshire, and succeeded to the baronetcy (and extensive Wynnstay estates, the largest in North Wales) when only a baby after his father was killed by a fall from his horse while hunting. His maternal grandparents were Elizabeth (née Wyndham) Grenville (daughter of the Tory statesman Sir William Wyndham, 3rd Baronet) and Prime Minister George Grenville.

== Career ==
Williams-Wynn sat for Midhurst from January to May 1807. From 1824 to 1853, he served as the British Envoy to Denmark.

He was appointed Knight Commander, Order of the Bath and was appointed Knight Grand Cross, Hanoverian Order.

== Personal life ==
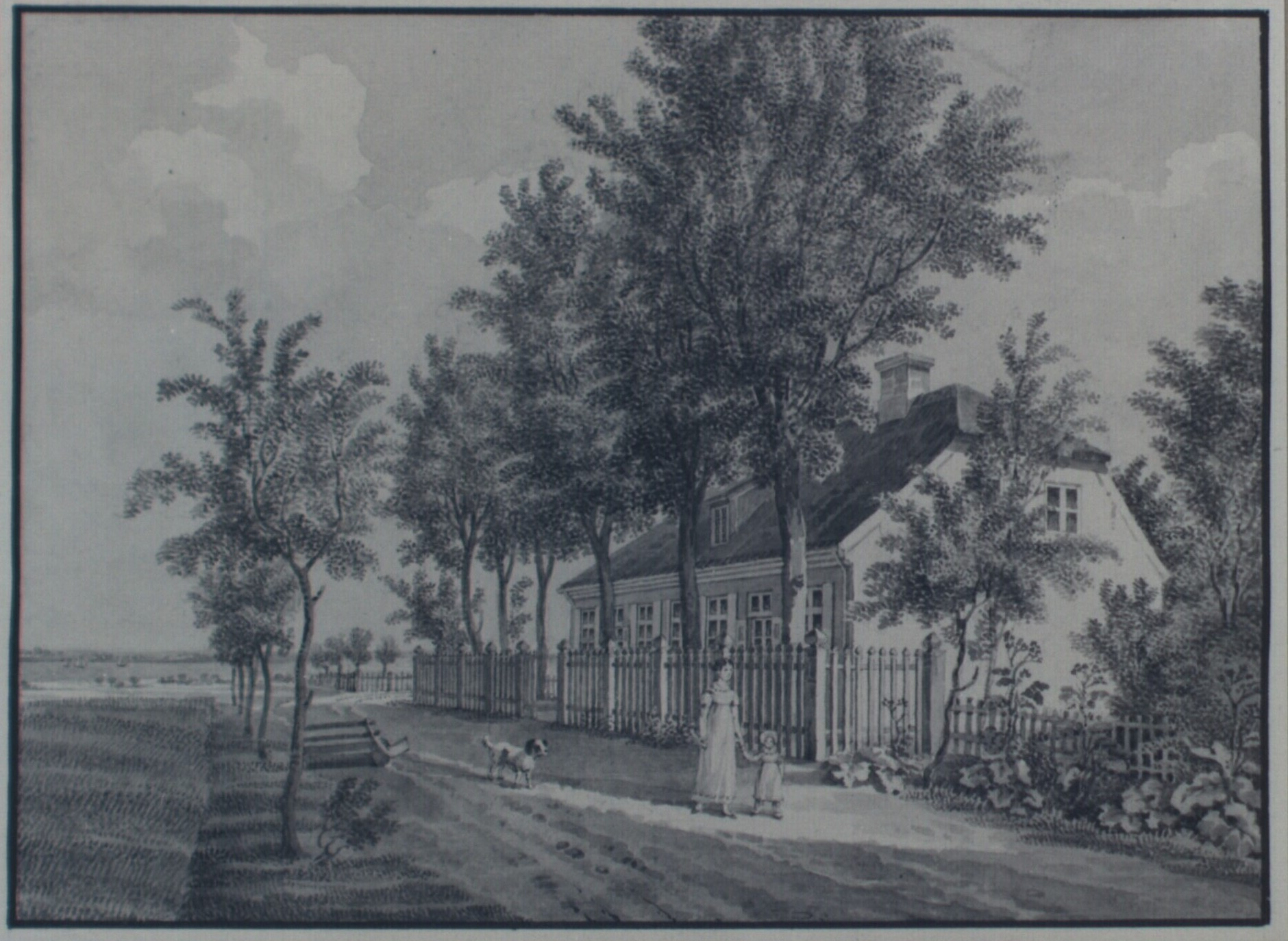
Williams-Wynn's country house in Copenhagen, drawing by H.F.F. Holm.

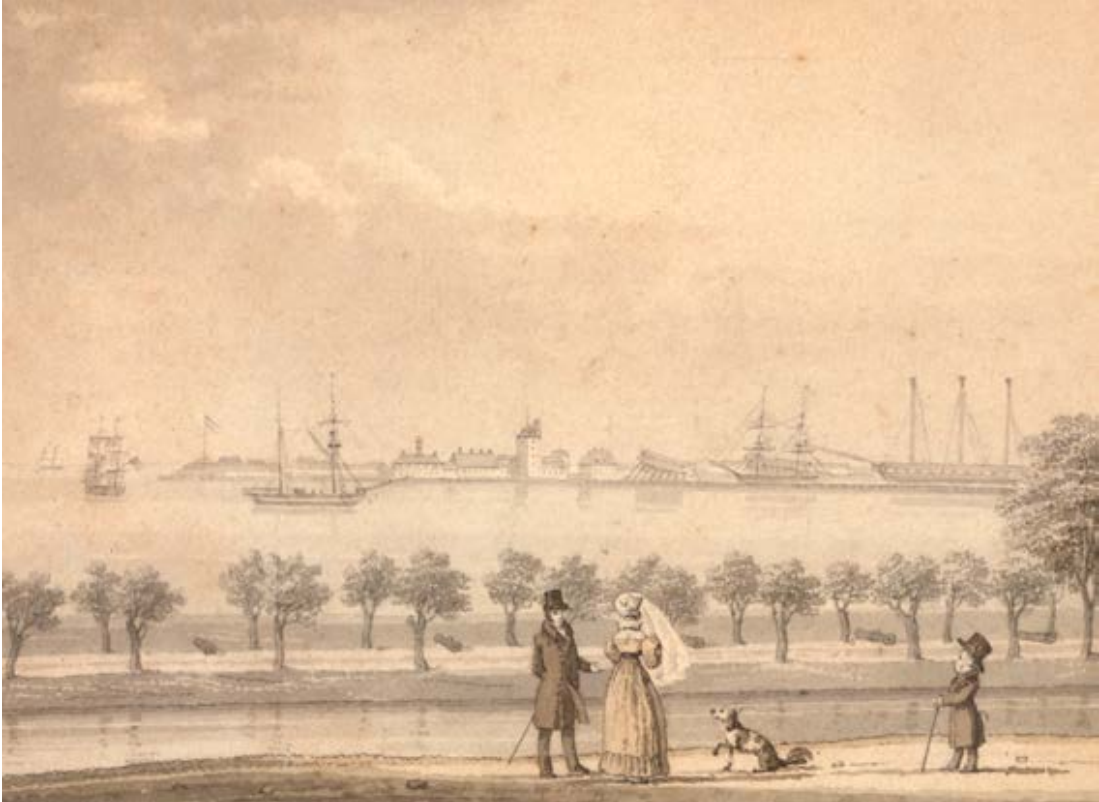
A watercolour by[H.F.F. Holm from Langelinie in Copenhagen withy Wynn's son seen in the bottom right corner.

On 30 September 1813, he married Hon. Hester Frances Smith, daughter of Robert Smith, 1st Baron Carrington of Upton and the former Anne Boldero-Barnard. Together, they were the parents of:

- Charlotte Henrietta Williams-Wynn (1815–1873), who married Count Friedrich von Bismarck in 1847.
- Grenville Watkin Williams-Wynn (1816–1865), who suffered from dwarf growth. He was a well-known figure in Copenhagen, both due to his physical disposition and his courtship of the ballet dancer Lucile Grahn. William Wynn was a patron of the artist H.G.F. Holm.
- Katharine Williams-Wynn (c. 1818–1881), who married Gen. John Studholme Brownrigg, son of John Studholme Brownrigg, MP for Boston, in 1840.
- Arthur Watkin Williams-Wynn (1819–1854), a Major of the 23rd Royal Welsh Fusiliers who fought in the Crimean War and was killed in action at Battle of the Alma.
- Henry Bertie Watkin Williams-Wynn (1820–1895), who married Marion Limond, daughter of Maj.-Gen. Sir James Limond, in 1848.
- Marie Emily Williams-Wynn (1826–1905), who married her first cousin, Col. Sir Watkin Williams-Wynn, 6th Baronet, in 1852.

Williams-Wynn died on 28 March 1856.

=== Descendants ===
Through his eldest daughter Charlotte, he was a grandfather of four, including Countess Helene von Bismarck-Schierstein (1850–1903) (who married Maj. Wilfred Joseph Cripps), and Count Otto Franz Karl von Bismarck-Schierstein (1854–1910).

Parliament of the United Kingdom
Preceded by John Smith; William Wickham	Member of Parliament for Midhurst; January 1807 – May 1807; With: William Conyngham Plunket	Succeeded by Samuel Smith; James Abercromby
Diplomatic posts
Preceded by Augustus John Foster	British Envoy to Denmark; 1824–1853	Succeeded by The Earl of Sheffield
