= Thomas Truman =

English cricketer

Personal information
- Born: 29 December 1880; Newton Abbot, Devon
- Died: 14 September 1918 (aged 37); Etrun, France
- Batting: Right-handed

Domestic team information
- Years: Team
- 1910-1913: Gloucestershire
- Source: Cricinfo, 30 March 2014

Thomas Truman (29 December 1880 – 14 September 1918) was an English cricketer. He played for Gloucestershire between 1910 and 1913.
