= Thomas Chester-Master (1841–1914) =

English Conservative politician

Thomas Wiliam Chester-Master (15 May 1841 – 14 November 1914) was an English Conservative politician who sat in the House of Commons from 1878 to 1885.

Chester-Master was born in London, the eldest son of Thomas William Chester Master and his wife Catherine Elizabeth Cornewall daughter of Sir George Cornewall, 4th Baronet. He was educated at Harrow School and Christ Church, Oxford. He was a major in the Royal North Gloucestershire Militia and a J.P. for Gloucestershire and Monmouthshire.

In March 1878 Chester-Master was elected at a by-election as the member of parliament (MP) for the borough of Cirencester. He held the seat until the parliamentary borough was abolished at the 1885 general election. Chester-Master did not stand for Parliament again until the 1892 general election, when he contested the new Cirencester division of Gloucestershire. In a by-election later that year he tied in votes with Harry Levy-Lawson but lost in the run-off by-election in 1893.

Chester-Master died at the age of 73.

== Family ==
Chester-Master married in 1866, Georgina Emily Rolls, fifth daughter of John Etherington Welch Rolls of The Hendre, Monmouthshire.

Parliament of the United Kingdom
Preceded by Allen Bathurst	Member of Parliament for Cirencester; 1878 – 1885	Succeeded by Arthur Brend Winterbotham
Preceded by Arthur Brend Winterbotham	Member of Parliament for Cirencester; 1892 – 1893	Succeeded by Harry Levy-Lawson
