= Richard George (MP) =

English politician

Richard George (1562 – c. 1613), of Baunton, Gloucestershire, was an English politician.

He was a member (MP) of the parliament of England for Cirencester in 1601.
