= Henry Ferrers (antiquary) =

English antiquary and MP (1550-1633)

Henry Ferrers (26 January 1550 – 10 October 1633) was an English antiquary and MP.

== Life ==
Ferrers was the son and heir of Edward Ferrers of Baddesley Clinton, Warwickshire, by Bridget, daughter and heiress of William, lord Windsor, and was born in that county on 26 January 1550. He became a student at Oxford, probably as a member of Hart Hall, in the beginning of Queen Elizabeth I's reign, but it is not known whether he took a degree. Afterwards he retired to his patrimony, and devoted himself to the study of heraldry, genealogy, and antiquities. Ferrers was apparently a Member of Parliament for Callington, Cornwall, in 1597, and was a Catholic (Charles Dodd, Church Hist. iii.74). He died on 10 October 1633, and was buried in the church of Baddesley Clinton.

== Works ==
He was the earliest collector of materials for the history of his county, with the exception of John Rous, and he intended to publish a Perambulation of Warwickshire on the model of William Lambarde's Perambulation of Kent, but did not carry out the plan. William Camden says that he was "a man both for parentage and for knowledge of antiquity, very commendable and my special friend; who … hath at all times courteously shewed me the right way when I was out, and from his candle, as it were, hath lighted mine". William Dugdale, who in writing the Antiquities of Warwickshire made extensive use of Ferrers's manuscript collections, describes him as an eminent antiquary and "a man of distinguished worth, reflecting lustre on the ancient and noble family to which he belonged". John Guillim described Ferrers as "a man very judicious in matters of honour". Some of his manuscripts are preserved at the College of Arms, others in the Ashmolean Museum, Oxford, and the British Museum. "He had also in his younger days", says Anthony Wood, "a good faculty in poetry, some of which I have seen scattered in divers books printed in the reign of qu. Elizabeth" (Athenæ Oxon. ed. Bliss, ii.572; see Ferrers, George).

The writer of the introduction to Archæologia conjectured that Ferrers was the author of "A Motion for erecting an Academy Royal, or Colledge of King James", a manuscript written in 1617, but the real author was Edmund Bolton.

== Family ==
He married, in October 1582, Jane, daughter and coheiress of Henry White, esq., of South Warnborough, Hampshire, son of Sir Thomas White, knight, and by her (who died 7 September 1586, aged 23) he had a son Edward and a daughter Mary.
