= Cirencester (constituency) =

Parliamentary constituency in the United Kingdom, 1868–1918

Gloucestershire, East or Cirencester
- Former county constituency for the House of Commons

1885–1918
- Seats: one
- Created from: Cirencester Borough
- Replaced by: Cirencester and Tewkesbury and Stroud

Cirencester
- Former borough constituency for the House of Commons

1571–1885
- Seats: two (1571-1868), one (1868-1885)
- Replaced by: Cirencester

Cirencester was a parliamentary constituency in Gloucestershire. From 1571 until 1885, it was a parliamentary borough, which returned two Member of Parliament (MPs) to the House of Commons of the Parliament of the United Kingdom until 1868, and one member between 1868 and 1885. In 1885 the borough was abolished but the name was transferred to the county constituency in which it stood; this constituency was abolished for the 1918 general election.

== History ==
The town sent Members to Parliament on at least one occasion during the 14th century and again in 1547. Cirencester borough as established in 1571 consisted of part of the parish of Cirencester, a market town in the east of Gloucestershire. In 1831, the population of the borough was 4,420, and the town contained 917 houses.

The right to vote was exercised by all resident householders of the borough who were not receiving alms, an unusually liberal franchise for the period in any but the smallest towns, which meant that there were about 500 qualified voters. This arose from the chance that a dispute over the franchise arose in 1624, and the House of Commons had to decide whether only the freeholders could vote or if the right should extend to all the householders. The 1620s was a rare period when the Commons as a matter of policy tended to decide for the broadest interpretation in franchise disputes (all 15 cases brought before them in that decade were resolved in favour of the solution which enfranchised most voters), and consequently in Cirencester the householders acquired the right of which they were never subsequently deprived (and which was later confirmed at another disputed election in 1724). Another election petition, in 1709, turned on whether the inhabitants of the Abbey, Emery and Sperringate Lane sections of the town were included within the borough; the Commons ruled that they were, but they were excluded again after yet another disputed election in 1792.

Despite Cirencester's relatively large electorate, the local landowners (or "patrons") were able to exert a very substantial influence over the elections, and it could probably be fairly described as a pocket borough. From at least the start of the 18th century, the Bathurst family were Lords of the Manor and had a share of the patronage, almost invariably filling one of the seats themselves and occasionally nominating the other MP as well. The Master family, whose influence predated that of the Bathursts, were able to command the second seat for long periods. In the 18th century, both the Bathursts and the Masters were Tories. Nevertheless, there were signs that the townspeople could show independence on occasion: in 1754, when the head of the Masters was a child and the Bathursts tried to take both seats, Cirencester shocked its Tory patrons by electing a local Whig nobleman instead.

The Reform Act 1832 extended the borough's boundaries slightly to include the whole of the parish, increasing the population to 5,420; but even with the revised franchise this gave Cirencester only 604 electors. The reform apparently did little to democratise the borough, for Bathursts and Masters continued to be elected almost continually throughout its existence. As subsequent Reform Acts raised the barrier for representation, Cirencester lost one of its two MPs in 1868 and had its boundaries further extended to take in the adjoining parish of Stratton; but, still too small, the borough was abolished altogether in 1885.

However, the name was transferred to the county constituency in which the town was placed, formally called The Eastern (or Cirencester) Division of Gloucestershire. This was a substantially-sized constituency fairly similar in its boundaries to the modern Cotswold District Council, with a strong rural element but including a number of small towns apart from Cirencester - Chipping Campden, Fairford, Moreton-in-Marsh, Tetbury and Stow-on-the-Wold among them. In character it proved more Liberal than Cirencester borough had done, though this may have been as much from the dilution of the Bathurst influence as from political factors - consequently instead of being a safe Conservative seat it was generally a knife-edge marginal. Arthur Winterbotham, the Liberal who had won the constituency by 700 votes at its first election, in 1885, was re-elected unopposed when he became a Liberal Unionist in 1886, but when he switched back to the Liberals at the next general election his majority fell to 153. Winterbotham died later the same year, and the by-election was decided in favour of the Conservative candidate, Colonel Thomas Chester-Master, by just 3 votes; but his defeated opponent petitioned against the result and after further scrutiny of the ballots the result was revised and declared to be tied. It was impossible at this stage to give a casting vote to the returning officer (the usual solution to a tied election at that period), so the election had to be run again.

The constituency was abolished in 1918, being split between the new Cirencester and Tewkesbury and Stroud constituencies.

== Boundaries ==
1885–1918: The Sessional Divisions of Chipping Campden, Cirencester, Fairford, Moreton-in-Marsh, Northleach, Stow-on-the-Wold, and Tetbury.

== Members of Parliament ==
=== MPs 1547 ===
Year	First member	Second member
1547	John Eston	George Ferrers

=== Borough constituency (1571–1885) ===
==== MPs 1571–1640 ====
Year	First member	Second member
1571	Gabriel Blike	Thomas Poole
1572	Thomas Poole	Thomas Strange
1584	Thomas Poole (jun)	William Estcourt
1586	George Master	William Bridges, sat for Gloucestershire and was replaced by Charles Danvers
1589	Charles Danvers	George Master
1593	Oliver St John	Henry Ferrers
1597	Henry Poole	James Wroughton
1601	Richard Browne	Richard George
1604–1611	Arnold Oldsworth	Richard Martin, sat for Christchurch and was replaced by Edward Jones, who died and was replaced by Sir Anthony Manie
1614	Sir Anthony Manie	Robert Strange
1621–1622	Sir Thomas Roe	Thomas Nicholas
1624	Henry Poole	Sir William Master
1625	Sir Miles Sandys	Henry Poole
1626	Sir Neville Poole	John George
1628–1629	Sir Giles Estcourt	John George

==== MPs 1640–1868 ====
Year	First member	First party	Second member	Second party
April 1640	Henry Poole		John George	
November 1640	Sir Theobald Gorges	Royalist	John George	Royalist
January 1644	Gorges and George disabled from sitting - both seats vacant			
February 1648	Sir Thomas Fairfax		Nathaniel Rich	
December 1648	Fairfax not recorded as sitting after Pride's Purge		Nathaniel Rich	
1653	Cirencester was unrepresented in the Barebones Parliament			
1654	John Stone		Cirencester had only one seat in the First and Second Parliaments of the Protectorate	
1656	John Stone		Cirencester had only one seat in the First and Second Parliaments of the Protectorate	
January 1659	John Stone		Richard Southby	
May 1659	Nathaniel Rich		One seat vacant	
April 1660	Thomas Master		Henry Powle	
1661	The Earl of Newburgh		John George	
1671	Henry Powle		John George	
1679	Henry Powle		Sir Robert Atkyns	
1685	Thomas Master		Charles Levingston	
1689	Thomas Master		John Grubham Howe	
March 1690	Richard Howe		Henry Powle	
November 1690	Richard Howe		John Grubham Howe	
1698	Henry Ireton		Charles Coxe	
January 1701	James Thynne		Charles Coxe	
December 1701	William Master		Charles Coxe	
1705	Allen Bathurst		Henry Ireton	
1708	Allen Bathurst		Charles Coxe	
1712	Thomas Master	Tory	Charles Coxe	
1713	Thomas Master	Tory	Benjamin Bathurst	Tory
1727	Thomas Master	Tory	Peter Bathurst	Tory
1734	Thomas Master	Tory	William Wodehouse	
1735	Thomas Master	Tory	Henry Bathurst	Tory
1747	Thomas Master	Tory	Henry Bathurst	Tory
1749	John Coxe		Henry Bathurst	Tory
1754	Hon. Benjamin Bathurst	Tory	Hon. John Dawnay	Whig
1761	James Whitshed	Tory	Hon. John Dawnay	Whig
1768	James Whitshed	Tory	Estcourt Cresswell	
1774	James Whitshed	Tory	Samuel Blackwell	
1783	Henry Bathurst	Tory	Samuel Blackwell	
1784	Henry Bathurst	Tory	Samuel Blackwell	Whig
1785	Henry Bathurst	Tory	Richard Master	Tory
1792	Henry Bathurst	Tory	(Sir) Robert Preston	Tory
1795	Michael Hicks-Beach	Tory	(Sir) Robert Preston	Tory
1806	Michael Hicks-Beach	Tory	Joseph Cripps	Tory
1812	Michael Hicks-Beach	Tory	Henry Bathurst	Tory
1818	Joseph Cripps	Tory	Henry Bathurst	Tory
1834	Joseph Cripps	Conservative	Lord Edward Somerset	Conservative
1837	Joseph Cripps	Conservative	Thomas Chester-Master I	Conservative
1841	William Cripps	Conservative	Thomas Chester-Master I	Conservative
1844	William Cripps	Conservative	George Child-Villiers	Conservative
1848	Joseph Mullings	Conservative	George Child-Villiers	Conservative
1852	Joseph Mullings	Conservative	Hon. Ashley Ponsonby	Whig
1857	Joseph Mullings	Conservative	Allen Bathurst	Conservative
1859	Hon. Ashley Ponsonby	Liberal	Allen Bathurst	Conservative
1865	Hon. Ralph Dutton	Conservative	Allen Bathurst	Conservative
1868	Representation reduced to one member			

==== MPs 1868–1885 ====
Election	Member	Party
1868	Allen Bathurst, later Earl Bathurst	Conservative
1878 by-election	Thomas Chester-Master II	Conservative
1885	Borough abolished - name transferred to county division	

=== County constituency (1885–1918) ===
Election	Member	Party
1885	Arthur Winterbotham	Liberal
1886	Arthur Winterbotham	Liberal Unionist
1892	Arthur Winterbotham	Liberal
1892 by-election	Thomas Chester-Master	Conservative
1893 by-election	Harry Levy-Lawson	Liberal
1895	Hon. Benjamin Bathurst	Conservative
1906	Walter Essex	Liberal
1910	Hon. Benjamin Bathurst	Conservative
1918	constituency abolished	

== Elections ==
=== Elections in the 1830s ===
General election 1830: Cirencester (2 seats)
Party	Candidate	Votes	%	±%
Tory	Henry Bathurst	Unopposed		
Tory	Joseph Cripps	Unopposed		
Tory hold				
Tory hold				

General election 1831: Cirencester (2 seats)
Party	Candidate	Votes	%	±%
Tory	Henry Bathurst	Unopposed		
Tory	Joseph Cripps	Unopposed		
Tory hold				
Tory hold				

General election 1832: Cirencester (2 seats)
Party	Candidate	Votes	%	±%
Tory	Henry Bathurst	Unopposed		
Tory	Joseph Cripps	Unopposed		
Registered electors		604		
Tory hold				
Tory hold				

By-election, 6 August 1834: Cirencester
Party	Candidate	Votes	%	±%
Tory	Edward Somerset	Unopposed		
Tory hold				

- Caused by Henry Bathurst's succession to the Peerage, becoming 4th Earl Bathurst

General election 1835: Cirencester (2 seats)
Party	Candidate	Votes	%	±%
Conservative	Joseph Cripps	494	49.9	N/A
Conservative	Edward Somerset	405	40.9	N/A
Whig	Thomas Denman Whatley	91	9.2	New
Majority		314	31.7	N/A
Turnout		498	81.0	N/A
Registered electors		615		
Conservative hold		Swing	N/A	
Conservative hold		Swing	N/A	

General election 1837: Cirencester (2 seats)
Party	Candidate	Votes	%	±%
Conservative	Joseph Cripps	Unopposed		
Conservative	Thomas Chester-Master	Unopposed		
Registered electors		585		
Conservative hold				
Conservative hold				

=== Elections in the 1840s ===
General election 1841: Cirencester (2 seats)
Party	Candidate	Votes	%	±%
Conservative	William Cripps	Unopposed		
Conservative	Thomas Chester-Master	Unopposed		
Registered electors		552		
Conservative hold				
Conservative hold				

Chester-Master resigned by accepting the office of Steward of the Chiltern Hundreds, causing a by-election

By-election, 2 August 1844: Cirencester
Party	Candidate	Votes	%	±%
Conservative	George Child Villiers	Unopposed		
Conservative hold				

Cripps was appointed a Lord Commissioner of the Treasury, requiring a by-election.

By-election, 14 August 1845: Cirencester
Party	Candidate	Votes	%	±%
Conservative	William Cripps	Unopposed		
Conservative hold				

General election 1847: Cirencester (2 seats)
Party	Candidate	Votes	%	±%
Conservative	William Cripps	Unopposed		
Conservative	George Child Villiers	Unopposed		
Registered electors		485		
Conservative hold				
Conservative hold				

Cripps' death caused a by-election.

By-election, 24 May 1848: Cirencester
Party	Candidate	Votes	%	±%
Conservative	Joseph Mullings	262	66.8	N/A
Whig	Charles Ponsonby	130	33.2	New
Majority		132	33.6	N/A
Turnout		392	82.0	N/A
Registered electors		478		
Conservative hold				

=== Elections in the 1850s ===
General election 1852: Cirencester (2 seats)
Party	Candidate	Votes	%	±%
Conservative	Joseph Mullings	235	35.2	N/A
Whig	Ashley Ponsonby	218	32.7	N/A
Conservative	George Child Villiers	214	32.1	N/A
Turnout		334 (est)	76.8 (est)	N/A
Registered electors		434		
Majority		17	2.5	N/A
Conservative hold				
Majority		4	0.6	N/A
Whig gain from Conservative				

General election 1857: Cirencester (2 seats)
Party	Candidate	Votes	%	±%
Conservative	Allen Bathurst	307	44.2	+12.1
Conservative	Joseph Mullings	200	28.8	−6.4
Whig	Ashley Ponsonby	188	27.1	−5.6
Majority		12	1.7	−0.8
Turnout		348 (est)	82.2 (est)	+5.4
Registered electors		423		
Conservative hold		Swing	+7.5	
Conservative gain from Whig		Swing	−1.8	

General election 1859: Cirencester (2 seats)
Party	Candidate	Votes	%	±%
Conservative	Allen Bathurst	273	42.3	−1.9
Liberal	Ashley Ponsonby	190	29.5	+2.4
Conservative	Brent Follett	182	28.2	−0.6
Turnout		323 (est)	76.6 (est)	−5.6
Registered electors		421		
Majority		83	12.8	+11.1
Conservative hold		Swing	−1.6	
Majority		8	1.3	N/A
Liberal gain from Conservative		Swing	+2.5	

=== Elections in the 1860s ===
General election 1865: Cirencester (2 seats)
Party	Candidate	Votes	%	±%
Conservative	Allen Bathurst	296	42.9	+0.6
Conservative	Ralph Dutton	222	32.2	+4.0
Liberal	Julian Goldsmid	172	24.9	−4.6
Majority		74	10.7	−2.1
Turnout		431 (est)	92.9 (est)	+16.3
Registered electors		464		
Conservative hold		Swing	+1.5	
Conservative gain from Liberal		Swing	+3.2	

Seat reduced to one member

General election 1868: Cirencester
Party	Candidate	Votes	%	±%
Conservative	Allen Bathurst	629	68.9	−6.2
Liberal	Frederick Inderwick	284	31.1	+6.2
Majority		345	37.8	+27.1
Turnout		913	84.9	−8.0
Registered electors		1,076		
Conservative hold		Swing	−6.2	

=== Elections in the 1870s ===
General election 1874: Cirencester
Party	Candidate	Votes	%	±%
Conservative	Allen Bathurst	Unopposed		
Registered electors		1,101		
Conservative hold				

- Bathurst succeeded to the peerage, becoming Earl Bathurst.

By-election, 13 Mar 1878: Cirencester
Party	Candidate	Votes	%	±%
Conservative	Thomas Chester-Master	698	66.8	N/A
Liberal	Ashley Ponsonby	347	33.2	New
Majority		351	33.6	N/A
Turnout		1,045	92.6	N/A
Registered electors		1,128		
Conservative hold				

=== Elections in the 1880s ===
General election 1880: Cirencester
Party	Candidate	Votes	%	±%
Conservative	Thomas Chester-Master	Unopposed		
Registered electors		1,145		
Conservative hold				

Dorington

General election 1885: Cirencester
Party	Candidate	Votes	%	±%
Liberal	Arthur Winterbotham	4,782	54.2	New
Conservative	John Dorington	4,037	45.8	N/A
Majority		745	8.4	N/A
Turnout		8,819	86.8	N/A
Registered electors		10,157		
Liberal gain from Conservative				

General election 1886: Cirencester
Party	Candidate	Votes	%	±%
Liberal Unionist	Arthur Winterbotham	Unopposed		
Liberal Unionist gain from Liberal				

=== Elections in the 1890s ===
General election 1892: Cirencester
Party	Candidate	Votes	%	±%
Liberal	Arthur Winterbotham	4,207	50.9	New
Conservative	Thomas Chester-Master	4,054	49.1	N/A
Majority		153	1.8	N/A
Turnout		8,261	81.8	N/A
Registered electors		10,095		0.0
Liberal gain from Liberal Unionist				

1892 Cirencester by-election
Party	Candidate	Votes	%	±%
Conservative	Thomas Chester-Master	4,275	50.0	−0.9
Liberal	Harry Levy-Lawson	4,275	50.0	+0.9
Majority		0	0.0	N/A
Turnout		8,550	84.7	+2.9
Registered electors		10,095		0.0
Conservative gain from Liberal		Swing	+0.9	

- Chester-Master was originally declared the victor by 3 votes, but on petition and after scrutiny, the votes were declared equal and a new election was held.

1893 Cirencester by-election
Party	Candidate	Votes	%	±%
Liberal	Harry Levy-Lawson	4,687	51.3	+0.4
Conservative	Thomas Chester-Master	4,445	48.7	−0.4
Majority		242	2.6	+0.8
Turnout		9,132	90.9	+9.1
Registered electors		10,048		−0.5
Liberal hold		Swing	+0.4	

Bathurst

General election 1895: Cirencester
Party	Candidate	Votes	%	±%
Conservative	Benjamin Bathurst	4,509	51.2	+2.1
Liberal	Harry Levy-Lawson	4,294	48.8	−2.1
Majority		215	2.4	N/A
Turnout		8,803	89.6	+7.8
Registered electors		9,825		−2.2
Conservative gain from Liberal		Swing	+2.1	

=== Elections in the 1900s ===
General election 1900: Cirencester
Party	Candidate	Votes	%	±%
Conservative	Benjamin Bathurst	Unopposed		
Conservative hold				

General election 1906: Cirencester
Party	Candidate	Votes	%	±%
Liberal	Walter Essex	4,517	53.0	New
Conservative	Benjamin Bathurst	4,011	47.0	N/A
Majority		506	6.0	N/A
Turnout		8,528	88.2	N/A
Registered electors		9,673		N/A
Liberal gain from Conservative				

=== Elections in the 1910s ===
General election January 1910: Cirencester
Party	Candidate	Votes	%	±%
Conservative	Benjamin Bathurst	5,091	55.3	+8.3
Liberal	Walter Essex	4,108	44.7	−8.3
Majority		983	10.6	N/A
Turnout		9,199	92.6	+4.4
Registered electors		9,934		+2.7
Conservative gain from Liberal		Swing	+8.3	

General election December 1910: Cirencester
Party	Candidate	Votes	%	±%
Conservative	Benjamin Bathurst	4,788	54.4	−0.9
Liberal	Gilbert Beyfus	4,007	45.6	+0.9
Majority		781	8.8	−1.8
Turnout		8,795	88.5	−4.1
Registered electors		9,934		0.0
Conservative hold		Swing	−4.1	

1915 Prospective Election - Cirencester
Party	Candidate	Votes	%	±%
Conservative	Frederick W B Cripps			−
Liberal	Cyril Winterbotham			
