= Robert Atkyns (topographer) =

English antiquarian and MP (1647–1711)

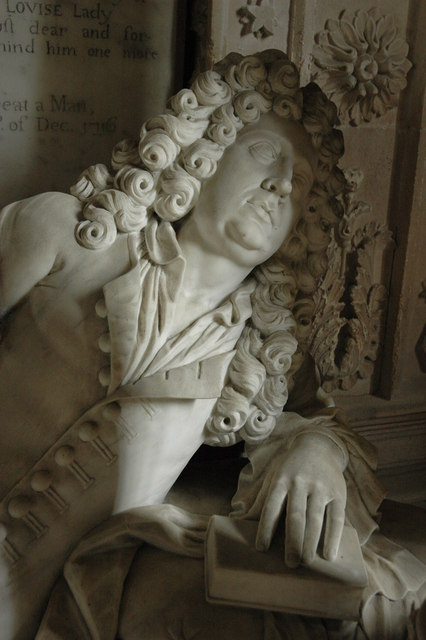
- Effigy of Atkyns in St Kenelm's Church, Sapperton
- Born: 1647
- Died: 29 November 1711 (aged 63–64)
- Occupations: topographer, antiquary and politician

Sir Robert Atkyns, FRS (1647 – 29 November 1711) was a topographer, antiquary and Member of Parliament. He is best known for his county history, The Ancient and Present State of Glostershire, published in 1712.

== Early life and education ==
Sir Robert was born in 1647, and was baptised on 26 August of that year. He was the eldest son of Sir Robert Atkyns, Chief Baron of the Exchequer, and sometime speaker of the House of Lords. Thomas Atkyns, who died in London 1401, was succeeded in the fourth generation by David Atkins, an eminent merchant in Chepstow, who removed before his death in 1552 to Tuffley, near Gloucester. Tuffley continued to be the family seat until the purchase of Sapperton, Gloucestershire, by Baron Atkyns in 1660.

He was educated at St Edmund Hall, Oxford (admitted 1663), and Lincoln's Inn (admitted 1661). He was called to the Bar in 1668 but did not practise.

== Career ==
Atkyns served as Deputy Receiver-General of Law Duties (1671–1672), Receiver-General (1672–1673), Comptroller (1673–1679), Commissioner for Assessment for Gloucestershire (1673–1680, 1689–1690) and Deputy Lieutenant for Gloucestershire (1683–1688). He was knighted by Charles II on his visit to Bristol on 5 September 1663.

He was elected M.P. for the borough of Cirencester (1679–85) and afterwards for the county of Gloucester (1685–1689).

== Publications ==
Atkyns was the author of The Ancient and Present State of Glostershire, London, 1712. The first edition contains a fine portrait of the author by Michael Vandergucht, together with a series of views of seats in the county, drawn and engraved by Jan Kip in his earliest manner.

== Honours ==
Atkyns was elected a Fellow of the Royal Society in November 1664.

== Personal life and death ==
Atkyns married Louise-Margaret (Louisonne), the daughter of Sir George Carteret of Hawnes, Bedfordshire, in about 1674. He died on 29 November 1711 at his house in Westminster of dysentery, at the age of sixty-five, and was buried at Sapperton, where his monument is preserved.

== References and sources ==
Sources

- This article incorporates text from a publication now in the public domain: Coote, Charles Henry (1885). "Atkyns, Robert (1647-1711)". In Stephen, Leslie (ed.). Dictionary of National Biography. Vol. 2. London: Smith, Elder & Co.

== See also ==
- Samuel Rudder
