= William Master (MP for Cirencester) =

English politician

Sir William Master MP

High Sheriff of Gloucestershire
- In office 1627–1627

Member of the English Parliament for Cirencester
- In office 1624–1624

Personal details
- Born: 1600 Gloucestershire, England
- Died: 1662 (aged 61–62)
- Spouse: Alice Estcourt

Sir William Master (1600–1662) was an English politician.

== Early life ==
William Master was born in 1600 in Gloucestershire, England, the son of George Master and Bridget Cornwall, daughter and heiress of John Cornwall, Esq. of Marlborough. He was the grandson of Richard Master.

In 1622, he was knighted by King James I, and in 1623, elected to represent Cirencester in Parliament. He served as High Sheriff of Gloucestershire in 1627 following his appointment to the position by King Charles I.

== English Civil War ==
Initially Master was favourable to Parliament at the outbreak of the English Civil War, however, following the Royalist invasion of his town, Master signed over contributions to the Royal Army after Prince Rupert and Prince Maurice were quartered in his home, and he became a staunch Royalist. King Charles I would also spend time in Master's home, once in August 1642 en route from Oxford to Bristol and again in 1644 en route from Oxford to Bath.

His estate was eventually sequestered and by 1652 was still faced with difficulty as a result.

== Marriage and family ==
Sir William married Alice, daughter of Sir Edward Estcourt, and had 12 children:

- Thomas, esquire and heir
- William, author of "Essays and Observations, Theological and Moral"
- George, barrister
- Richard
- John, doctor
- Robert
- Mary, married Richard Browne, Esq.
- Ann, married Richard Morgan, Esq.
- Bridget, married Thomas Smythe, Esq.
- Alice
- Elizabeth
- Winifred
