= Charlotte Maria Radclyffe, 3rd Countess of Newburgh =

Scottish Jacobite sympathiser (1694–1755)

The Right Honourable The Countess of Newburgh
- Born: Charlotte Maria Livingston; 1694
- Died: 4 August 1755 (aged 60–61)
- Resting place: St Giles in the Fields, London Borough of Camden
- Political party: Jacobite
- Spouses: Hon. Thomas Clifford (m. 1713; died 1718) Charles Radclyffe (m. 1724; died 1746)
- Children: 8
- Parent(s): Charles Livingston, 2nd Earl of Newburgh; Lady Frances Brudenell
- Relatives: James Livingston, 1st Earl of Newburgh (grandfather)

Charlotte Maria Radclyffe, 3rd Countess of Newburgh or Charlotte, Countess of Derwentwater (née Livingston) (1694 – 4 August 1755) was a Scottish Jacobite sympathiser. A suo jure Countess, she was forced into a marriage that gave her earldom to her new husband.

== Early life ==
She was the daughter of Charles Livingston, 2nd Earl of Newburgh (1664–1694) and Lady Frances Brudenell (d. 1736), an Irish aristocrat who is best known as the subject of a satire in which she was portrayed as the leader of a society of Lesbians. As her father died before she was born, Charlotte became the Countess of Newburgh upon her birth in 1694. After her father's death, her mother remarried to Richard Bellew, 3rd Baron Bellew of Duleek. From her mother's second marriage, she had a younger half-brother, John Bellew, 4th Baron Bellew of Duleek.

Charlotte's maternal grandparents were Francis, Lord Brudenell (son and heir apparent of Robert Brudenell, 2nd Earl of Cardigan) and the former Lady Francis Savile (a granddaughter of Thomas Savile, 1st Earl of Sussex). Her paternal grandparents were James Livingston, 1st Earl of Newburgh and, his second wife, Anne Poole (daughter of Sir Henry Poole). Her grandfather was a Member of Parliament for Cirencester who supported the Royalist cause in the English Civil War before his death in December 1670.

== Personal life ==
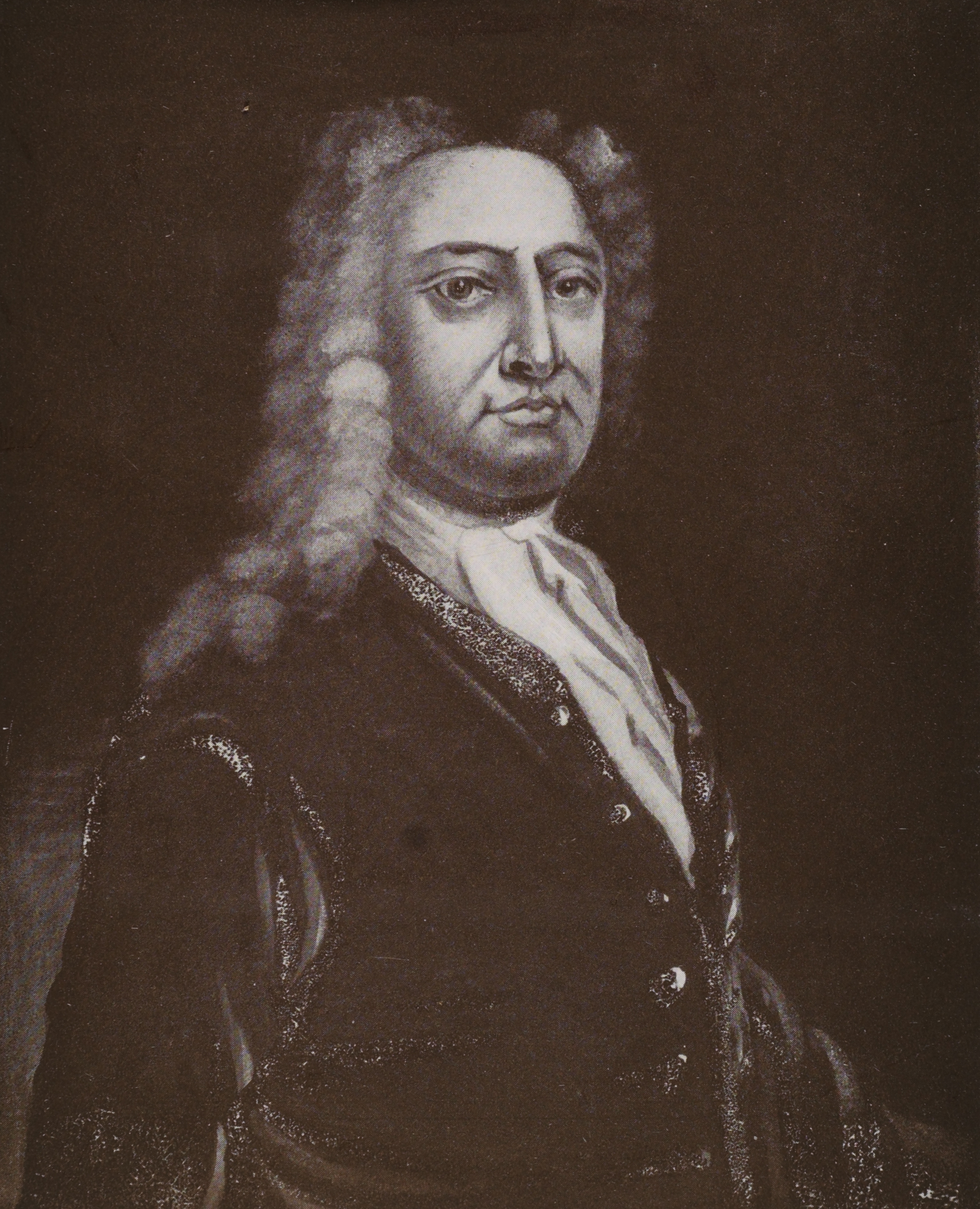
Her second husband, Charles Radclyffe, de jure Earl of Derwentwater

On 22 December 1713, Lady Newburgh was married to the Hon. Thomas Clifford, the eldest surviving son and heir apparent of Hugh Clifford, 2nd Baron Clifford of Chudleigh and Anne Preston (second daughter and co-heiress of Rev. Sir Thomas Preston, 3rd Baronet, of Furness Abbey). Before his death on 2 December 1718, she was the mother of two children with Clifford:

- Lady Anne Clifford (1715–1793), who married Gen. John Joseph Mahony, Count Mahony, eldest son of Count Daniel O'Mahony, Count of Castile, in 1739. After his death, she married Don Carlo Severino in 1773.
- Lady Frances Clifford, who married William Middleton of Yorkshire in 1738.

Charlotte was attacked in her bedroom by Charles Radclyffe, de jure Earl of Derwentwater, who had climbed down the chimney. Radclyffe, a younger son of Edward Radclyffe, 2nd Earl of Derwentwater and Lady Mary Tudor (an illegitimate daughter of King Charles II), had previously made fifteen marriage proposals, but after the attack she had little choice but to marry him on 24 June 1724. Together, they had six children, several of whom were born in Rome:

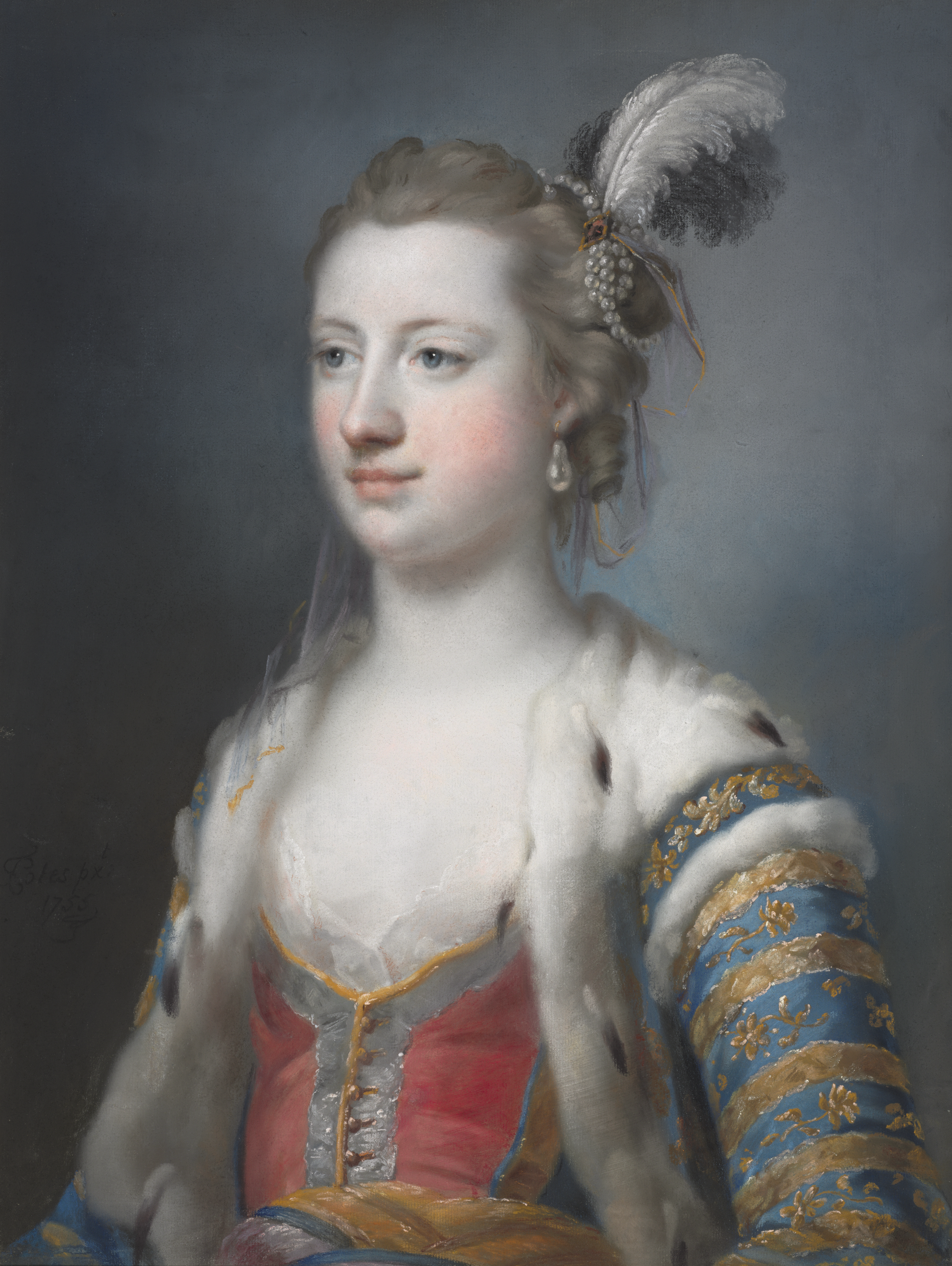
Lady Mary Radcliffe, painting by Francis Cotes, 1755

- James Bartholomew Radclyffe, 4th Earl of Newburgh (1725–1787), who married Barbara Kemp, eldest daughter of Anthony Kemp and the Hon. Anne Browne (a daughter of Henry Browne, 5th Viscount Montagu).
- Hon. James Clement Radclyffe (1727–1788), a Major General who married Clementina Parry.
- Lady Mary Radclyffe (1732–1798), who married Francis Eyre of Warkworth Castle in 1755, by whom she had issue.
- Lady Charlotte Radclyffe (d. 1800), who died unmarried in London.
- Lady Barbara Thomasine Radclyffe, who became a nun.
- Hon. Charles Radclyffe (d. 1749), who died as a minor.

Her husband was an active Jacobite, taking part in the uprising in 1715 and in 1745. He was condemned to death but managed to escape. He was eventually caught and beheaded on 8 December 1746.

=== Death and descendants ===
Through her eldest daughter, she was a grandmother of Countess Cecilia Carlotta Francisca Anna Mahony, Countess Mahony (1740–1789), who married Prince Benedetto Giustiniani, 5th Prince of Bassano Romano and Duke of Corbara (d. 1793) in 1757. Charlotte lived until 4 August 1755, when she was buried with her husband at St Giles in the Fields. Their son James Bartholomew Radclyffe, 4th Earl of Newburgh became the Earl and his son was the next but he had no children. The earldom returned to the descendants of Thomas Clifford, starting with Prince Vincenzo Giuseppe Filippo Graziliano Giacopo Gasparo Baldassaro Melchior Domenico Giustiniani, 6th Prince of Bassano Romano, Duke of Corbara and de jure 6th Earl of Newburgh. His younger brother was His Eminence Prince Giacomo Giustiniani, President of the Congregation of the Reverend Basilica of Saint Peter, last member of the Giustiniani de Banca Family, who died the night of 23–24 February 1843.

Peerage of Scotland
Preceded by Charles Livingstone	Countess of Newburgh; 1694–1755	Succeeded by James Bartholomew Radclyffe
