= Dilston Castle =

Tower house in Northumberland, England

- Northumberland, England
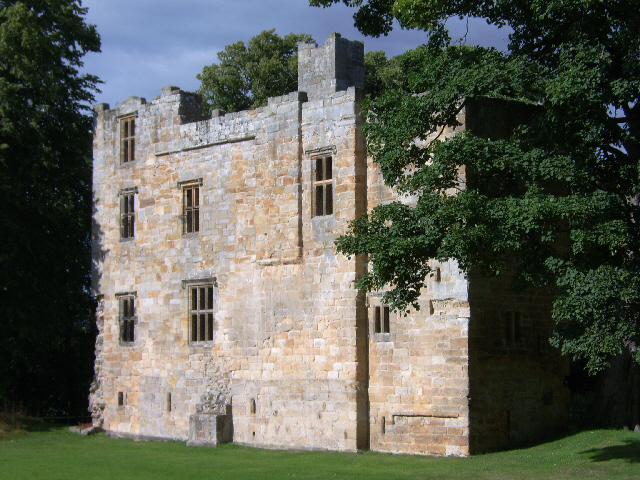
- Dilston Castle, 2005

Location
- Dilston is on the south bank of the Tyne in Northumberland, facing Corbridge. It has a multi-tributary fast stream, the Devil's Water.
- Coordinates: 54.965°N 2.039°W
- Grid reference: NY975633

Dilston Castle is a ruined tower house at Dilston in the parish of Corbridge, Northumberland, England. Both the tower and its attendant private chapel are scheduled monuments and Grade I listed buildings.

The three-storey tower was built by Sir William Claxton on the site of an earlier pele tower in the 15th century.

== The Radclyffe family ==
In 1621 the castle was acquired by the Radclyffe family as a result of the marriage of Edward Radclyffe to the Claxton heiress. The Catholic Radclyffes built the adjacent private chapel in 1616. Four of the Radcliffe children including Margaret Radcliffe were abroad in a convent.

In 1622 Sir Francis Radclyffe incorporated the tower house into a new manor house, which was to become known as Dilston Hall.

A later owner, Francis Radclyffe, 1st Earl of Derwentwater was a Royalist during the Civil War and his estates were sequestrated by the Commonwealth. The property was reverted to the family at the 1660 Restoration. The 3rd Earl, James Radclyffe, was the son of Lady Mary Tudor and as such an illegitimate grandchild of Charles II. In 1709 he began ambitious works to replace the old house with a substantial mansion. The new mansion was never completed because he took part in the Jacobite rising of 1715 in support of James Francis Edward Stuart, the so-called 'Old Pretender'. He was convicted of treason and executed in 1716. The ghost of his wife is reputed to haunt the castle.

His brother Charles Radclyffe, also involved the Jacobite rebellions, escaped to France, but was similarly attainted of high treason. He returned to support the later 1745 uprising, was captured, and was executed in 1746 under the sentence imposed 30 years before.

== The Derwentwater estates after 1716 ==
The attainder of the 3rd Earl would normally have resulted in his property (including Dilston) passing to the Crown. However, he only had a life interest under his 1712 marriage settlement, so that his estates passed to his two-year-old son John, who died aged 18. On his death in 1731, the estates would have passed to his uncle Charles Radclyffe, who was still living abroad, but he had also been attainted in 1716. After him, the estates might have passed to his son James Bartholomew Radclyffe, 4th Earl of Newburgh, but an act of Parliament, the British Nationality Act 1730 (4 Geo. 2. c. 21) had been passed in 1731 amending ("explaining") an act of Queen Anne concerning naturalisation (the Foreign Protestants Naturalization Act 1708 (7 Ann. c. 5)) so as to exclude the children born abroad to attainted persons from being British subjects. This prevented James Lord Kinnaird and any siblings from inheriting (since foreigners could not own land in England) thus the land forfeited to the Crown.

Forfeited Estates (Derwentwater Estate) Act 1731
- Act of Parliament
- Parliament of Great Britain
- Long title: An act for making void the several contracts for sale of the estate of James late earl of Denwentwater, to William Smith, esquire, and also of the annuity of two hundred pounds during the life of Charles Radcliffe, and the arrears thereof to Matthew White, esquire, and the several conveyances made in pursuance of the same.
- Citation: 5 Geo. 2. c. 23
- Territorial extent: Great Britain

Dates
- Royal assent: 1 June 1732
- Commencement: 13 January 1732 (Note: Start of session.)
- Repealed: 30 July 1948
Other legislation
Repealed by	Statute Law Revision Act 1948
Relates to	Crown Lands (Forfeited Estates) Act 1715; Crown Lands (Forfeited Estates) Act 1717; Lotteries Act 1722; Forfeited Estates (Greenwich Hospital) Act 1734; Crown Lands (Forfeited Estates) (Greenwich Hospital) Act 1737; Crown Lands (Forfeited Estates) Act 1748

Status: Repealed

Text of statute as originally enacted

The Forfeited Estates Commission had offered for sale in July 1723 the interests in remainder in these estates contingent upon the death without male issue of John. These were purchased by William Smith of Billiter Square, London for £1,060. However the sale was irregular as the original contract was cancelled and a new one made, in the presence of two commissioners (rather than the quorum of four) and without the sale being re-advertised, as required – the sale was declared void by the Forfeited Estates (Derwentwater Estate) Act 1731 (5 Geo. 2. c. 23). The purchase had been, according to the commissioners' registrar, signed on behalf of a group including John Bond, Sir Joseph Eyles and Matthew White. This was speculative, yet would have given Smith and his colleagues property worth £5,000 per year at the time of the sale, and over £6,000 when the sale was impugned. Two commissioners were held responsible for the contract (irregular and at an undervalue), Denis Bond and John Birch so expelled from the Commons for their part in the affair, whereas Sir John Eyles and Sir Thomas Hales, who had conducted the original sale and whose names had been on the final contract suffered no penalty.

Forfeited Estates (Greenwich Hospital) Act 1734
- Act of Parliament
- Parliament of Great Britain
- Long title: An Act for the Application of the Rents and Profits of the Estates forfeited by the Attainders of James late Earl of Derwentwater and Charles Radcliffe.
- Citation: 8 Geo. 2. c. 29
- Territorial extent: Great Britain

Dates
- Royal assent: 15 May 1735
- Commencement: 14 January 1735
- Repealed: 30 July 1948
Other legislation
Amended by	Crown Lands (Forfeited Estates) (Greenwich Hospital) Act 1737; Greenwich Hospital Act 1834
Repealed by	Statute Law Revision Act 1948
Relates to	Crown Lands (Forfeited Estates) Act 1715; Lotteries Act 1722; Forfeited Estates (Derwentwater Estate) Act 1731; Crown Lands (Forfeited Estates) Act 1748; Greenwich Hospital Act 1865

Status: Repealed

Text of statute as originally enacted

Crown Lands (Forfeited Estates) (Greenwich Hospital) Act 1737
- Act of Parliament
- Parliament of Great Britain
- Long title: An Act for explaining and amending an Act of the Eighth Year of His present Majesty's Reign, intituled, "An Act for the Application of the Rents and Profits of the Estates forfeited by the Attainders of James late Earl of Derwentwater and Charles Radcliffe."
- Citation: 11 Geo. 2. c. 30
- Territorial extent: Great Britain

Dates
- Royal assent: 20 May 1738
- Commencement: 24 January 1738
- Repealed: 30 July 1948
Other legislation
Amends	Forfeited Estates (Greenwich Hospital) Act 1734
Repealed by	Statute Law Revision Act 1948
Relates to	Crown Lands (Forfeited Estates) Act 1715; Lotteries Act 1722; Forfeited Estates (Derwentwater Estate) Act 1731; Crown Lands (Forfeited Estates) Act 1748; Greenwich Hospital Act 1865

Status: Repealed

Text of statute as originally enacted

Crown Lands (Forfeited Estates) Act 1748
- Act of Parliament
- Parliament of Great Britain
- Long title: An Act for vesting the several Estates of James late Earl of Derwentwater and Charles Radcliffe, deceased, comprized in several Settlements therein mentioned, in Trustees, for an absolute Estate of Inheritance, for the Benefit of the Royal Hospital at Greenwich, and for raising certain Sums of Money, out of Part of the said Estates, for the Relief of the Children of the said Charles Radcliffe.
- Citation: 22 Geo. 2. c. 52
- Territorial extent: Great Britain

Dates
- Royal assent: 13 June 1749
- Commencement: 29 November 1748
- Repealed: 30 July 1948
Other legislation
Repealed by	Statute Law Revision Act 1948
Relates to	Crown Lands (Forfeited Estates) Act 1715; Forfeited Estates (Time for Claims) Act 1716; Crown Lands (Forfeited Estates) Act 1717; Lotteries Act 1722; British Nationality Act 1730; Forfeited Estates (Derwentwater Estate) Act 1731; Forfeited Estates (Greenwich Hospital) Act 1734; Crown Lands (Forfeited Estates) (Greenwich Hospital) Act 1737

Status: Repealed

Text of statute as originally enacted

The 1731 act directed that the Court of Exchequer should sell the property, but it was not sold. Instead, the Forfeited Estates (Greenwich Hospital) Act 1734 (8 Geo. 2. c. 29) directed that Crown income from the estate (after payment of various annuities and the interest on mortgages) should be employed to completing the building of Greenwich Hospital. A further act, the Crown Lands (Forfeited Estates) (Greenwich Hospital) Act 1737 (11 Geo. 2. c. 30) was passed in 1738 to deal with difficulties that had arisen under this. Dilston Hall (left uncompleted on the execution of the 3rd Earl) thus became residence for the hospital's local estate steward, but deteriorated; the commissioners ordered its demolition in 1765, leaving the castle tower and the chapel. Following the execution of Charles Ratcliffe in 1746 (see above), Lord Kinnaird as his eldest son petitioned the king, claiming to be entitled the estate, but the Commissioners of Greenwich Hospital rejected his claim, because his right had not been claimed before the Forfeit Estates Commission, and because he was an alien. Being unable to finance litigation over this, he asked that the king make financial provision for him, and his mother Charlotte Maria Radclyffe, 3rd Countess of Newburgh (with his approval) asked for provision for his brother and three sisters. Accordingly, a compromise was reached that the Hospital Commissioners should pay Lord Kinnaird £24,000, and that £6,000 should be divided among his siblings, else they would have all become destitute upon the death of their mother. This was implemented by the Crown Lands (Forfeited Estates) Act 1748 (22 Geo. 2. c. 52).

On the Countess's death in 1755, Lord Kinnaird succeeded as 4th Earl of Newburgh, and lived until 1786. The 5th Earl of Newburgh then applied to Parliament for restitution of the estates, but was granted an annuity of £2,500, which he and his widow enjoyed until their deaths in 1814 and 1861 respectively. The hospital's revenue from the estates had risen by the 1780s to £15,000. The estate remained in their hands until the commissioners transferred it to the Admiralty Board under the Greenwich Hospital Act 1865 (28 & 29 Vict. c. 89). The board then sold the estate to Wentworth Blackett Beaumont, 1st Baron Allendale.

== Restoration of the castle ==
A restoration of the buildings began in 2001, and the large tower and chapel were opened to the public for part of 2003.

In 2004, £220,000 was awarded towards renovating the early 17th-century bridge (The Lord's Bridge) near the castle, and conservation work to the Jacobean (Stuart) range of buildings with cobbled floors that share the grounds with the castle.

Excavations shortly after documented the remains of the demolished Dilston Hall and its 17th-century service range, and evidenced the medieval manor. The restorations of the castle, funded by the Heritage Lottery Fund, included work on a new roof, repointing, rebuilding the missing upper floor in wood, and the missing staircase.

The castle shares grounds with Cambian Dilston College, a residential college for young adults with learning difficulties. The college was for some decades a maternity ward, until the charity mentioned began their use of the site. This was partly the purchase decision of the late life peer actor-manager Lord Rix, raised in East Yorkshire, recipient of ten honorary degrees and a knighthood, having a daughter with Down Syndrome and after decades of fundraising for them becoming Mencap's President.

== In folklore ==
The castle features in the folk ballad 'Derwentwater's Farewell' (Roud 2616, not to be confused with Roud 89, Child 208 'Lord Derwentwater'), an imagining of the 3rd Earl's last words at the scaffold. It contains the lines: "Farewell to pleasant Dilston Hall, / My father's ancient seat. / A stranger may now call thee his, / Which gars my heart to greet." The song is attributed to antiquarian Robert Surtees (1779-1834), who was in the habit of inventing 'traditional' ballads.

Folk legends also held that the Divelswater - the stream below the castle - ran with blood either when the 3rd Earl was beheaded or on the anniversary of his execution.
