= Francis Radclyffe =

Francis Radclyffe may refer to:

- Francis Radclyffe, 1st Earl of Derwentwater and 3rd Baronet (1625–1697)
- Sir Francis Radclyffe, 1st Baronet of the Radclyffe Baronets, of Derwentwater

== See also ==
- Frances Radclyffe (disambiguation) for the female version of the name
- Francis Ratcliffe, zoologist
