= Henry Graham (of Levens) =

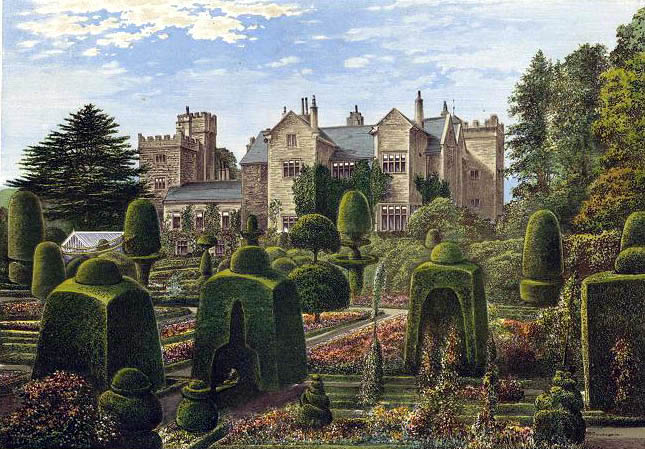
Levens Hall

Henry Graham, of Levens (ca. 1676 – 7 January 1706/1707), also spelt Grahme, was an English gentleman, heir to a Westmorland estate, and member of parliament.

Graham was the eldest of the three sons of James Grahme or Graham of Levens (1649–1729), by his marriage to Dorothy Howard, daughter of William Howard and a granddaughter of Thomas Howard, 1st Earl of Berkshire (1587–1669). James Graham, who was a younger brother of Richard Graham, 1st Viscount Preston, became Keeper of the Privy Purse to King James II.

He first stood for parliament in the summer of 1700, at a county of Westmorland by-election which did not take place because of the dissolution of parliament. A Tory, his campaign was dogged by allegations that he and his father were Roman Catholics. However, in 1701 he was elected as a knight of the shire for Westmorland and held this seat in the House of Commons until his early death.

Graham's Westmorland home was at Levens Hall, a country house with a large estate four miles south of Kendal which his father had bought in 1689 for £24,000. However, although he was his father's heir, Graham inherited nothing from him. His father outlived him by more than twenty years and, indeed, outlived both of his brothers, so that in the end the property went to an heiress.

On 23 May 1705, at Knightsbridge, Graham married Lady Mary Tudor, an illegitimate daughter of King Charles II by Moll Davies. This wedding came less than a week after the death of the bride's first husband, Edward Radclyffe, 2nd Earl of Derwentwater, on 29 April. It was later reported that the two had been living together before her husband's death. The marriage caused Graham great trouble, both with his family and with others. Before it, Graham had held an office in the household of Prince George of Denmark, the husband of Queen Anne, but as a result of the wedding he was dismissed from it.

Graham died at Westminster.
