= James Radclyffe =

James Radclyffe may refer to:

- James Radclyffe, 3rd Earl of Derwentwater, English Jacobite,
- James Bartholomew Radclyffe, 4th Earl of Newburgh, British nobleman
