= Charles Radclyffe =

English Catholic nobleman (1693–1746)

Charles Radcliff, de jure Earl of Derwentwater
- de jure 5th Earl of Derwentwater
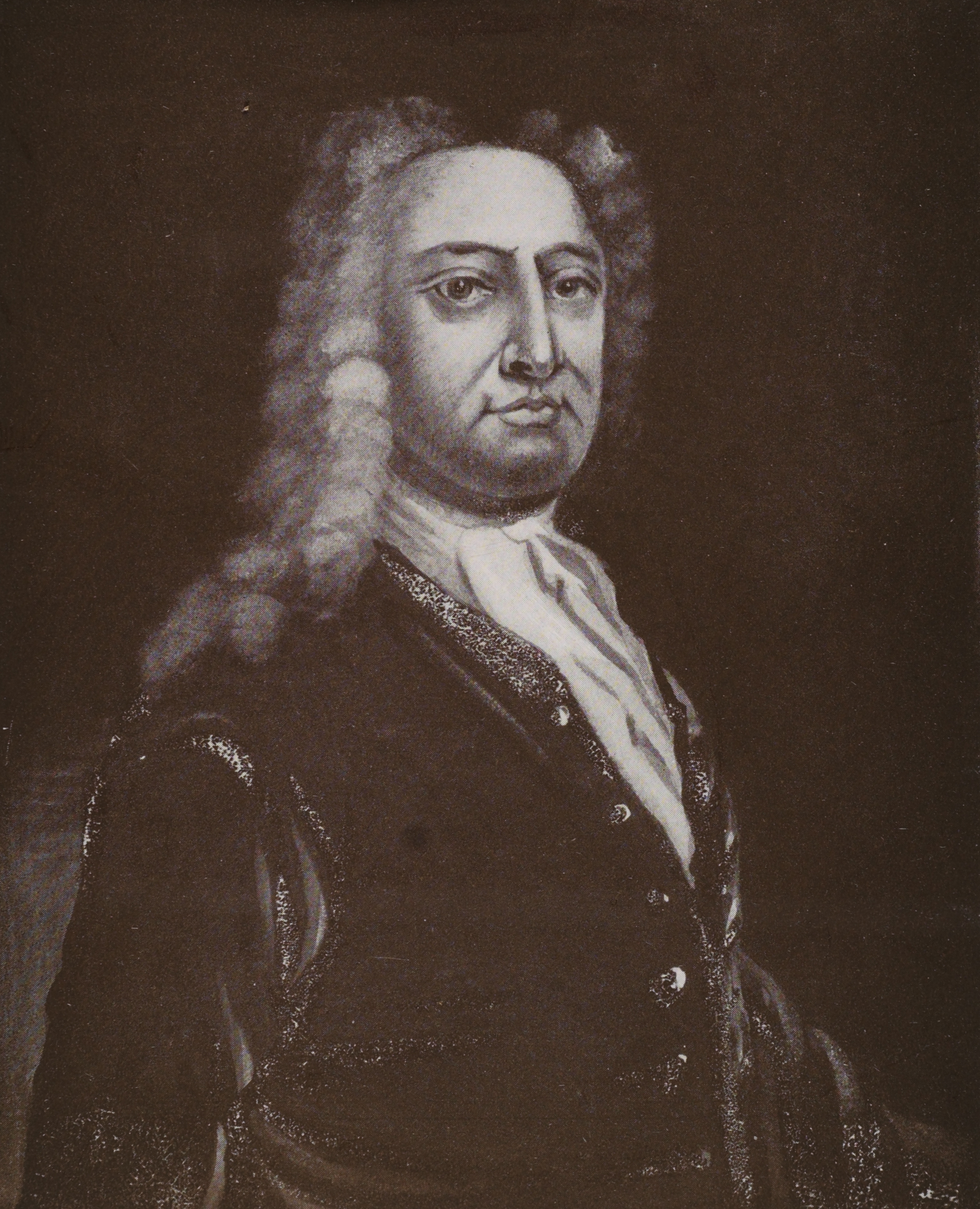
- Known for: Jacobite
- Born: Charles Radcliff or Radclyffe; 3 September 1693; Little Parndon, Essex, England
- Died: 8 December 1746 (aged 53); Tower Hill, London, England
- Spouse: Charlotte Maria Livingston, 3rd Countess of Newburgh (m. 1724)
- Issue: James Bartholomew Radclyffe, 4th Earl of Newburgh
- Parents: Edward Radclyffe, 2nd Earl of Derwentwater; Lady Mary Tudor

Charles Radclyffe (3 September 1693 – 8 December 1746), titular 5th Earl of Derwentwater, was one of the few English participants in the Jacobite risings of both 1715 and 1745.

The Radclyffes were Catholics from Northumberland, with long-standing links to the exiled Stuarts; sentenced to death in 1716, he escaped and spent the next 30 years in Europe. He was captured at sea along with his eldest son in November 1745 en route to Scotland and executed on 8 December 1746, under the warrant issued in 1716. His son James was released and later settled in Slindon, West Sussex.

== Life ==
Charles Radclyffe was born 3 September 1693 in Little Parndon, Essex, third and youngest son of Edward, 2nd Earl of Derwentwater and Lady Mary Tudor, an illegitimate daughter of Charles II. He had two brothers and a sister: James, 3rd Earl of Derwentwater (1689–1716), Francis (1691–1715) and Mary (1697–1756). His brother Francis died in France, in May 1715.

On 24 June 1724, he married Charlotte Maria Livingston (1694–1755), daughter of the 2nd Earl of Newburgh and widow of Thomas Clifford. Their children included James, who inherited his mother's title in 1755, and Mary (1732–1798). He also had a daughter, Jane (1715–1755) from a relationship with Margaret Snowden (1697–1723). She is the main character in the 1962 novel Devil Water by Anya Seton that also features Radclyffe.

== Career ==
The Radclyffes were Catholics, with long-standing links to the Stuarts; his grandfather Sir Francis Radclyffe (1625–1697) was created Earl of Derwentwater by Charles II upon his son, Edward Radclyffe, marrying Lady Mary Tudor. His grandmother, Catherine Fenwick, came from another long-established Northumberland family; her brother Sir John Fenwick was executed in 1697 for conspiracy to assassinate William III.

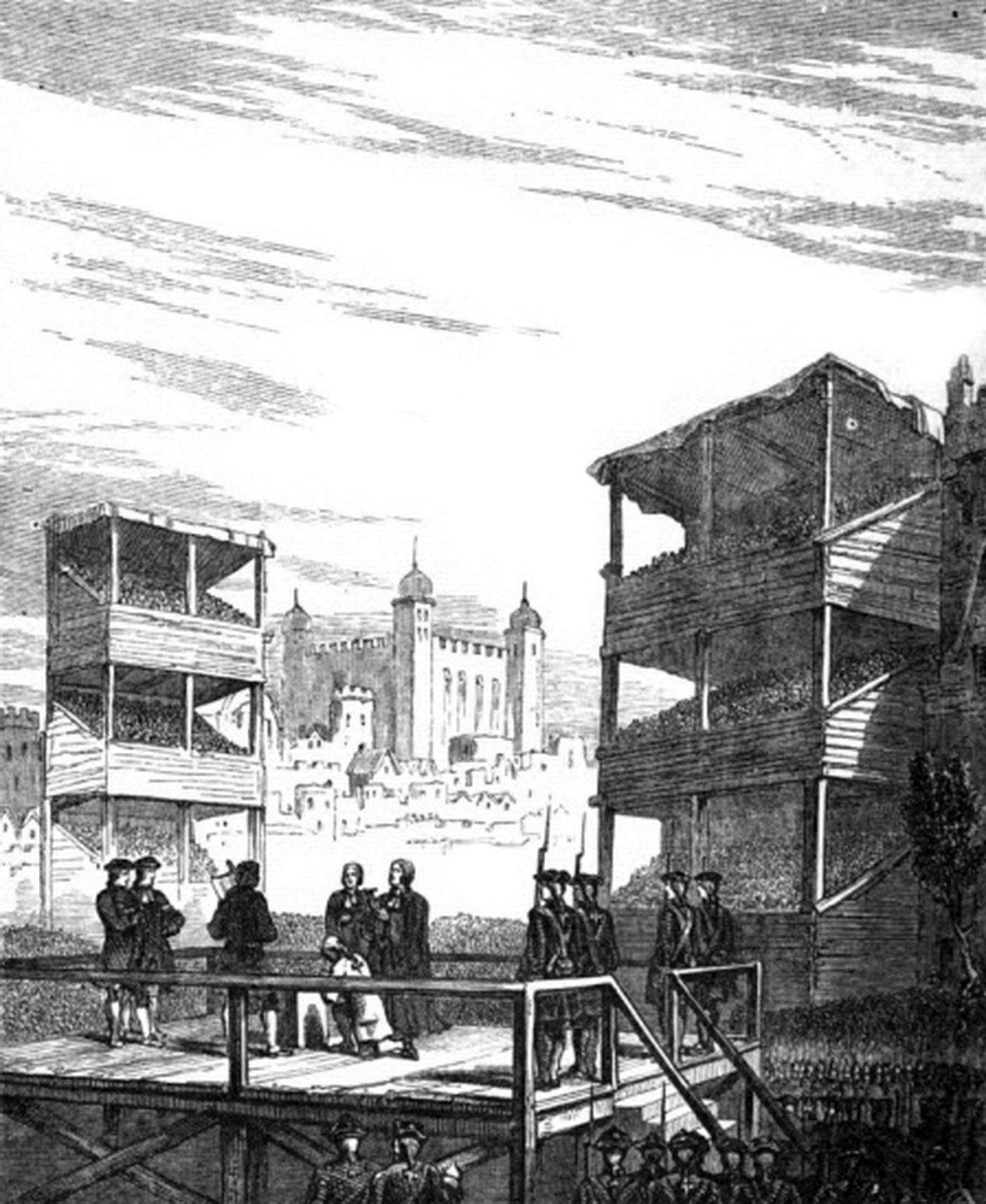
Radclyffe's execution, December 1746

His elder brother James was educated at the exile court in Saint-Germain-en-Laye, where he was companion to James Francis Edward Stuart. Allowed to return to England in 1709, he and Charles joined the 1715 Rising, with a troop of 70 servants and friends. Captured at Preston, they were both found guilty of treason and condemned to death. Witnesses at the trial claimed Charles was in command, but despite efforts to save him, James was executed at Tower Hill in February 1716 and his title died with him. In December 1716, Charles escaped from Newgate Prison with 13 other prisoners when a door was left open, and made his way to France.

He spent many years in Rome, the location of the Stuart court post-1718, including a period as private secretary to Prince Charles. His nephew John, de jure 4th Earl Derwentwater, died in 1731, leaving a legacy to "my kinsman, Mr Thompson", which may refer to an alias used by Charles, who now styled himself 5th Earl Derwentwater. He visited London and Essex in 1733 and 1739, reputedly with the knowledge of the government.

Like many Jacobites, he was a Freemason, who reportedly served as Grandmaster of the Grande Loge de France in 1738. He is also listed as an officer in the Order of the Fleur de Lys, one of several organisations claiming to inherit the legacy of the Knights Templar; the Order still exists, although the more fantastic assertions have since been disproved.

In November 1745, during the Jacobite Rising, Charles and his son James boarded a French ship taking arms and supplies from Dunkirk to the Scottish port of Montrose. It was intercepted in the North Sea by HMS Sheerness and the two were taken to the Tower of London. Charles had been commissioned into Dillon's Regiment, part of the Franco-Irish Brigade, a common technique used in hopes of being treated as a prisoner of war if captured, rather than a rebel. Francis Towneley, colonel of the Manchester Regiment, also employed this defence but the authorities carefully scrutinised such claims and rejected the vast majority. Lord Chancellor Hardwicke used the 1716 warrant to execute Charles in December 1746; although technically not a peer, he was beheaded, rather than being hanged, drawn and quartered, the normal fate for those outside the peerage found guilty of treason.

If he had not escaped in 1716, Charles would in all probability have been pardoned, but the government was particularly harsh on families and individuals seen as habitual or repeat offenders. In a letter to his wife Charlotte the night before his execution, Charles refers to "Fanny, that other mother of my dear children." This is generally taken to refer to Lady Frances Clifford, Charlotte's sister-in-law from her first marriage, who may have assisted in bringing up Radclyffe's own children. He was buried in the church of St Giles in the Fields, Camden.

James was released and pardoned under the 1747 Act of Indemnity; in 1749, he married Barbara Kempe, another Catholic, whose family owned Slindon House near Slindon, West Sussex. He unsuccessfully petitioned for the return of the Derwentwater estates, which reverted to the government after the death of John Radclyffe in 1731 and the income assigned to the Greenwich Hospital. He succeeded his mother as Earl of Newburgh in 1755.

== Sources ==
- Arnold, Ralph (1959). Northern Lights: The Story of Lord Derwentwater. London: The Catholic Book Club.
- Cook, Alice, ed. (1901). Remains, historical and literary, connected with the palatine counties of Lancaster and Chester; Volume 44. Chatham Society.
- Craster, Henry, Sir (1893). A history of Northumberland. issued under the direction of the Northumberland county history committee. Simpkins & Co.
- Hampson, Gillian. "FENWICK, Sir John, 3rd Bt. (c.1644-97), of Wallington, Northumb. and Westminster". History of Parliament Online.
- Hitchin-Kemp, Fred (1902). General History of the Kemp and Kempe families. Leadenhall Press.
- Jackson, William (1795). The Newgate Calendar, Volume IV. A Hogg.
- Lincoln, Henry; Baigent, Michael (2002). The Holy Blood and the Holy Grail. Arrow. ISBN 978-0099503095.
- Seccombe, Thomas (1896). "Radcliffe, James" . Dictionary of National Biography. Vol. 47. pp. 126–128.
