= Countess of Derwentwater =

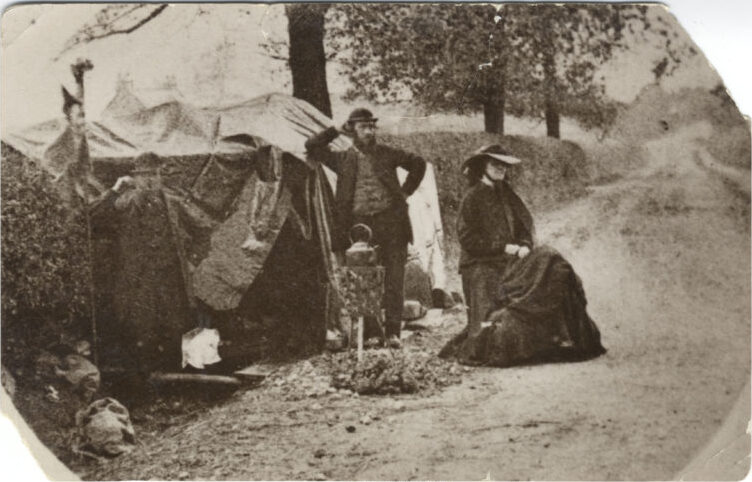
Countess of Derwentwater with tent

Amelia Matilda Mary Tudor Radclyffe (c.1831 - 27 February 1880) soi-disant Countess of Derwentwater, was a 19th-century claimant to the estates of the Earls of Derwentwater. She claimed to be the granddaughter of John Radclyffe, the only son of the 3rd Earl, and in 1860 commenced to agitate for her rights, initially contacting Lord Petre as the representative of descendants of the family using the name of Lady Matilda Radclyffe.

== Career ==
In September 1868, Amelia took active steps to assert her claim by forcibly taking possession of the old ruined castle at Dilston. She hoisted the Radclyffe flag on the ancient tower, and suspended portraits of the family on the ruined walls of the principal hall. Conformable to instructions from the Lords of the Admiralty, she was ejected by their agent, when she took up residence in a tent on the side of the road. After other proceedings she was imprisoned for contempt of court, her claim having formally been investigated and found to be invalid. Nevertheless, by her eccentric conduct in the prosecution of her claim, she continued to keep constantly before the public until her death.

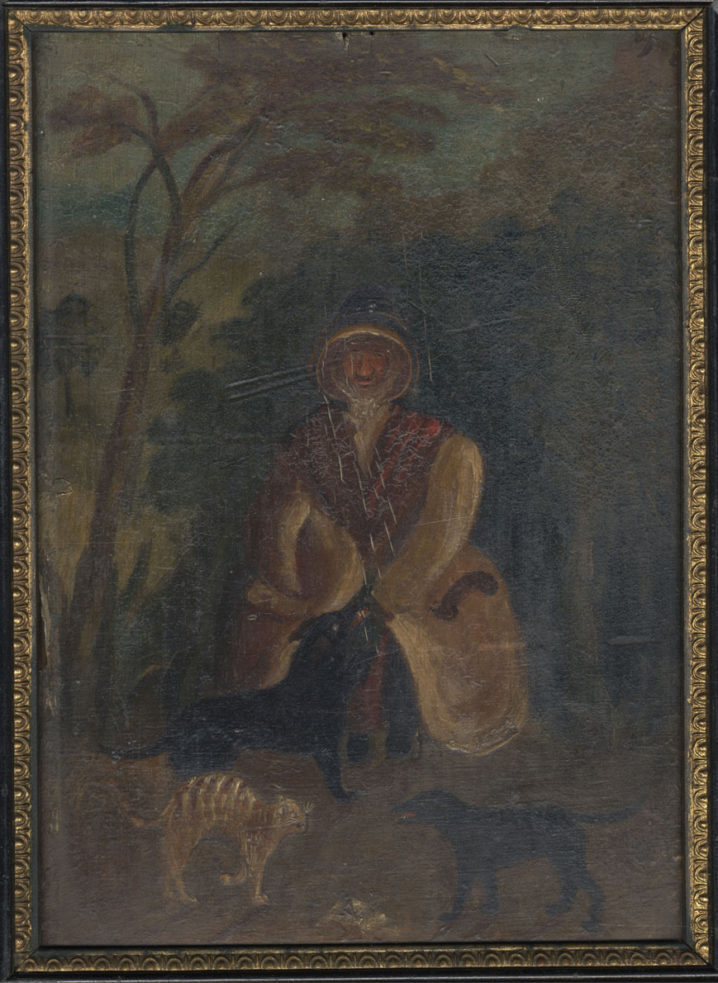
Countess of Derwentwater self portrait

She was an accomplished woman, a lover of fine art, and an artist in oil, and she was powerfully and sincerely impressed with the righteousness of her claim. Her assertions, published in her jottings, were that John Radclyffe, the son of the last Earl of Derwentwater, and de jure 4th Earl of Derwentwater, did not die in 1732, but was trafficked to Germany, and in 1740 married at Frankfort-on-Main, Elizabeth Arabella Maria, Countess of Waldstein. He died there in 1798, in his eighty-sixth year. His son James, at that time in his fifty-fifth year, was his heir, and was married to Eleanora the Countess Mouravieff, but leaving no issue, was succeeded by his brother, John James, who was born at Alston, in Cumberland, in 1764. The latter died in 1833, having married, late in life, Amelia Anna Charlotte, Princess Sobieski, a descendant of the noted Polish family of that name. They had several children, of whom John James, born in 1816, and Amelia Matilda Radclyffe, the soi-disant Countess of Derwentwater, were the only survivors.

In 1869 she sought to collect her rents, accompanied by Harry Brown, a bailiff of the Shotley Bridge Court; when the tenants refused to pay, she wielded an antiquated sword, and a short struggle ensued, resulting in the snapping of the sword. The Countess of Derwentwater was quite a character: when she took a steamer at Jersey City for Liverpool, her wardrobe was said to consist of over two hundred rich and elaborately trimmed dresses. She travelled with 15 trunks which were as old as the dresses.

Amelia’s true identity remains a mystery. Ralph Arnold in his 1959 book Northern Lights suggests that she may have been a lady’s maid from Dover by the name of Burke though he offers no further explanation of this. The Northumbrian Jacobites website suggests that she may have been a West Country servant girl trying her luck.

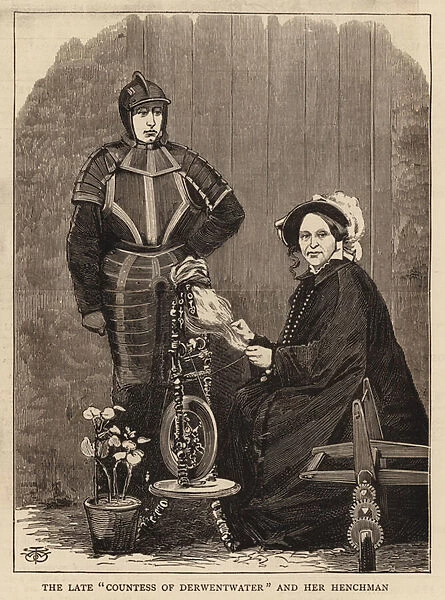
The late Countess of Derwentwater and her henchman. The Graphic 1880

The 'Countess' died at Durham Road in Durham on 27 February 1880. Her death was caused by bronchitis, after five days' illness. She had expressed a wish to be buried in the Radclyffe vault at Hexham, but her desire could not be complied with, and she was consequently buried at Blackhill Cemetery, Consett, County Durham. In 2012, a plaque was attached to the previously unmarked grave. Members of the Northumbrian Jacobite Society added a plaque to a small stone cross, which had been previously erected by society members George and Lorraine Hunter.
