= Lady Frances Brudenell =

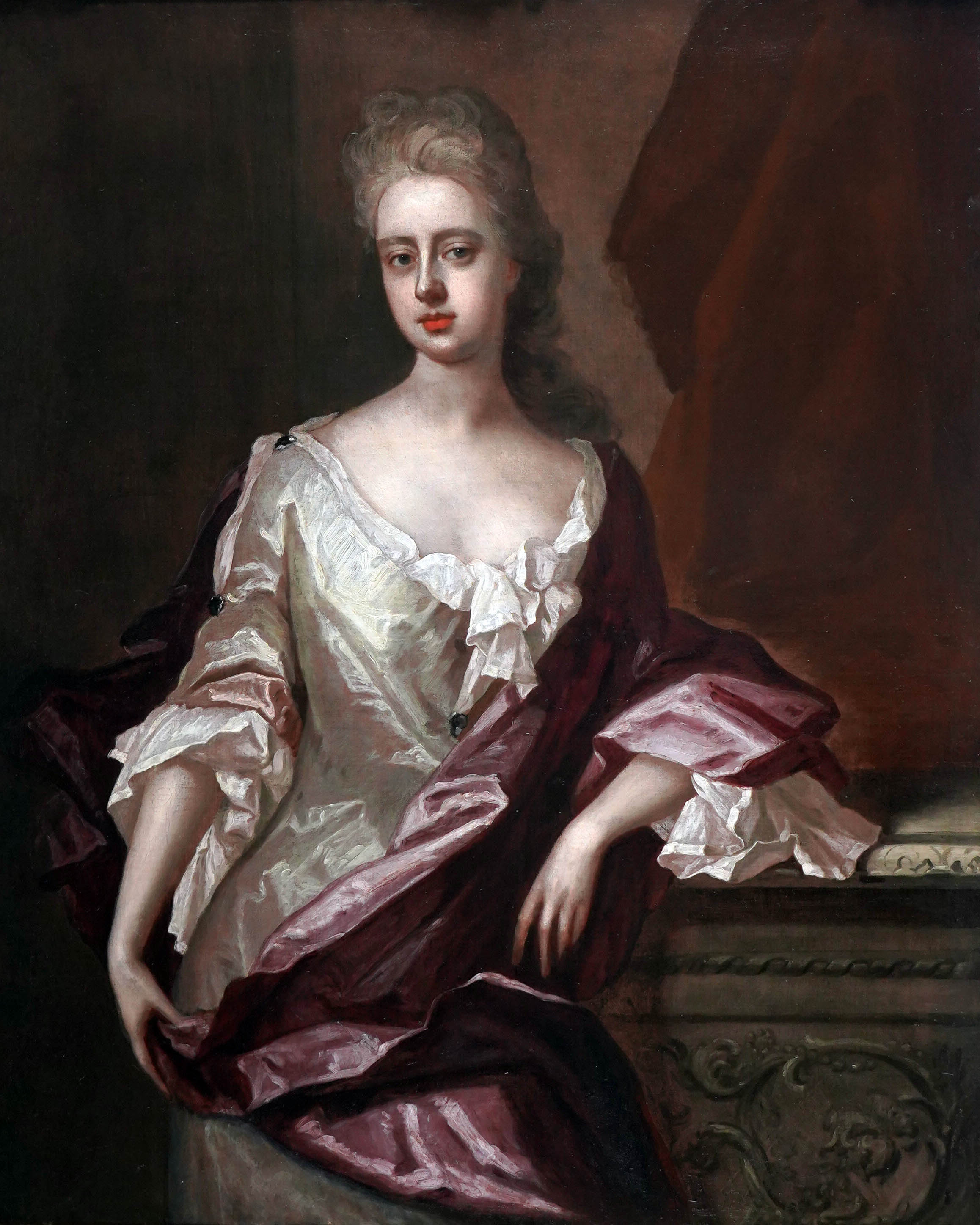
Lady Frances Brudenell, Countess of Newburgh by Michael Dahl, circa 1692-1694

Lady Frances Brudenell (before 1677 – 23 February 1735/36), Countess of Newburgh, was an Irish aristocrat known as the subject of a satire in which she was portrayed as the leader of a society of lesbians.

She was the daughter of Francis Brudenell, Lord Brudenell and Lady Frances Savile. She married twice, first to Charles Livingston, 2nd Earl of Newburgh (1692–1694, becoming Countess of Newburgh), then to Richard Bellew, 3rd Baron Bellew of Duleek (1695–1715, becoming Baroness Bellew of Duleek).

She was also rumoured to have had an unrecognised marriage to Sir Thomas Smyth.

Lady Frances was the subject (under the pseudonym "Myra") of a series of love poems published by George Granville, 1st Baron Lansdowne from 1712.

She was the subject of a debt action brought by an Oxford don, William King (nephew of Sir Thomas Smyth), who alleged she owed him several thousand pounds. He lost the case and in revenge, in 1732, wrote a satire against her, entitled "The Toast", which portrayed her as a promiscuous bisexual witch and lesbian named "Myra", and alleged that she ruled "a social circle of tribades in Dublin", her primary lover being Lady Margaret Allen. It is notable for an early use of the word lesbian in the modern sense.

She had several children including a daughter, Charlotte Maria Livingston (1694–1755), and a son, John Bellew, 4th Baron Bellew of Duleek (1702–1770).

She died on 23 February 1735/36 in Dublin, Ireland, and was buried in St. Audoen's Church, Dublin.
