= James Bartholomew Radclyffe, 4th Earl of Newburgh =

British nobleman (1725–1787)

James Bartholomew Radclyffe, 4th Earl of Newburgh and titular 6th Earl of Derwentwater (23 August 1725 – 2 January 1787) was a British nobleman, Earl of Newburgh in the Peerage of Scotland and titular Earl of Derwentwater in the Peerage of England.

== Biography ==
He was born on 23 August 1725, the son of Charles Radclyffe, titular 5th Earl of Derwentwater (titular only, due to the attainder of Charles' older brother James Radclyffe, 3rd Earl of Derwentwater in 1716) and Charlotte Maria Livingston, 3rd Countess of Newburgh.

During the Jacobite rising of 1745, Radclyffe was captured with his father, but soon released. His father was beheaded on 8 December 1746.

On 11 November 1749, he married Barbara Kemp. They had two children:

- Anthony James Radclyffe, 5th Earl of Newburgh (1757–1814)
- Lady Anne Radclyffe (c. 1758–1785)

He died on 2 January 1787, aged 61.

Peerage of England
Preceded by Charles Radclyffe	— TITULAR — Earl of Derwentwater; 1746–1787	Succeeded by Anthony James Radclyffe
Peerage of Scotland
Preceded by Charlotte Maria Livingston	Earl of Newburgh; 1755–1787	Succeeded by Anthony James Radclyffe
