= Earl of Newburgh =

Noble title in the Peerage of Scotland

Earldom of Newburgh
- Blazon: Quarterly: Or and Azure, four Lozenges counterchanged (Rospigliosi)
- Creation date: 31 December 1660
- Created by: Charles II
- Peerage: Peerage of Scotland
- First holder: James Livingston, Viscount of Newburgh
- Present holder: Filippo Gianbattista Camillo Francesco Aldo Maria Rospigliosi, 12th Earl of Newburgh
- Heir presumptive: Princess Benedetta Francesca Maria Rospigliosi, Mistress of Newburgh
- Subsidiary titles: Prince (Holy Roman Empire); Prince Rospigliosi; Prince of Castigline; Duke of Zagarolo; Marquis of Giuliana; Count of Chiusa; Baron of La Miraglia and Valcorrente; Lord of Aidone; Lord of Brugio; Lord of Contessa; Lord of Tappeto
- Former seat: Palazzo Rospigliosi

The title Earl of Newburgh (pronounced "New-bruh") was created in the Peerage of Scotland in 1660 for James Livingston, 1st Viscount of Newburgh, along with the subsidiary titles Viscount of Kynnaird and Lord Levingston.

The viscountcy of Newburgh and Livingston baronetcy, which devolved upon the 1st Earl, were created with remainder to heirs male and became extinct on the death of the 2nd Earl (2nd Viscount and 3rd Baronet). However, the Earldom and its subsidiary titles, which were created with remainder to heirs whomsoever, can be inherited through male and female lines, thus passing by marriage through various different families.

The 3rd Countess's second husband was the titular 5th Earl of Derwentwater (a younger brother of the attainted 3rd Earl), and so the 4th and 5th Earls of Newburgh were also titular Earls of Derwentwater.

On the death of the 5th Earl (also titular 7th Earl of Derwentwater), the title passed to a descendant of the daughter (and only child) of the 3rd Countess by her first husband, namely the 6th Prince Giustiniani. His daughter, the 7th Countess of Newburgh married the 4th Marquis Bandini and was succeeded, upon her death in 1877, by her son (created Prince Bandini-Giustiniani in 1863) as 8th Duke of Mondragone and 8th Earl of Newburgh. In 1941, upon the death of his son the 9th Earl, the title devolved upon the princely Rospigliosi family.

The 12th and present Earl of Newburgh is usually known in Italy - he lives in Milan - as Prince Rospigliosi, and holds several other titles of nobility: Duke of Zagarolo, Prince of Castiglione, Marquis of Giuliana, Count of Chiusa and Baron of La Miraglia and Valcorrente (Two Sicilies and Italy), Lord of Aldone, Burgio, Contessa and Trappeto (Rome), and Patrician of Venice, Genoa, Pistoia, Ferrara and Ravenna (Venice and Genoa). Italian titles are not protected by law since 1948.

== Livingston Baronets, of Kinnaird (1627) ==
- Sir John Livingston, 1st Baronet (d. 1628)
- Sir James Livingston, 2nd Baronet (c. 1622–1670) (created Viscount Newburgh in 1647 and Earl of Newburgh in 1660)

== Earls of Newburgh (1660) ==
- James Livingston, 1st Earl of Newburgh (c. 1622–1670)
- Charles Livingston, 2nd Earl of Newburgh (c. 1664–1694)
- Charlotte Maria Radclyffe, 3rd Countess of Newburgh (c. 1694–1755)
- James Bartholomew Radclyffe, 4th Earl of Newburgh and titular 6th Earl of Derwentwater (1725–1787)
- Anthony James Radclyffe, 5th Earl of Newburgh and titular 7th Earl of Derwentwater (1757–1814)
- Vincenzo Giuseppe Filippo Graziliano Giacopo Gasparo Baldassaro Melchior Domenico Giustiniani, 6th Prince Giustiniani and ''de jure'' 6th Earl of Newburgh (1762–1826)
- Maria Cecilia Agata Anna Josefa Laurenzia Donata Melchiorra Baldassara Gaspara Bandini, Duchess of Mondragone and 7th Countess of Newburgh (1796–1877)
- Sigismondo Niccolo Venanzio Gaetano Francisco Giustiniani-Bandini, 1st Prince Bandini-Giustiniani and 8th Earl of Newburgh (1818–1908)
- Carlo Giustiniani-Bandini, 2nd Prince Bandini-Giustiniani and 9th Earl of Newburgh (1862–1941)
- Maria Sofia Guiseppina Giustiniani-Bandini, 10th Countess of Newburgh (1889–1977)
- Giulio Cesare Taddeo Cosimo Rospigliosi, 10th Prince Rospigliosi and 11th Earl of Newburgh (1907–1986)
- Filippo Giambattista Camillo Francesco Aldo Maria Rospigliosi, 11th Prince Rospigliosi and 12th Earl of Newburgh (b. 1942)

== Present peer ==
Filippo Giambattista Camillo Francesco Aldo Maria Rospigliosi (born 4 July 1942), 11th Prince Rospigliosi (Prince of the Holy Roman Empire) and 12th Earl of Newburgh, is the elder son of the 10th Prince and 11th Earl (1907–1986) and his wife Giulia Visconti, daughter of Don Guido Carlo dei Duchi Visconti di Modrone, Count of Lonate Pozzolo.

On 15 July 1972 the 12th Earl married Baroness Luisa Caccia Dominioni, daughter of Count Annibale Caccia Dominioni, and they had one child:

- Princess Benedetta Francesca Maria Rospigliosi, Mistress of Newburgh, heiress presumptive (born 4 June 1974), who in 1999 married Piero Albertario and has a son Carlo Filippo Maria Albertario (born 2001).

== See also ==
- Count
- House of Lords
- Palazzo Rospigliosi
- Rospigliosi family
