= Lady Mary Tudor =

Illegitimate daughter of Charles II of England

Mary Tudor
- Countess of Derwentwater
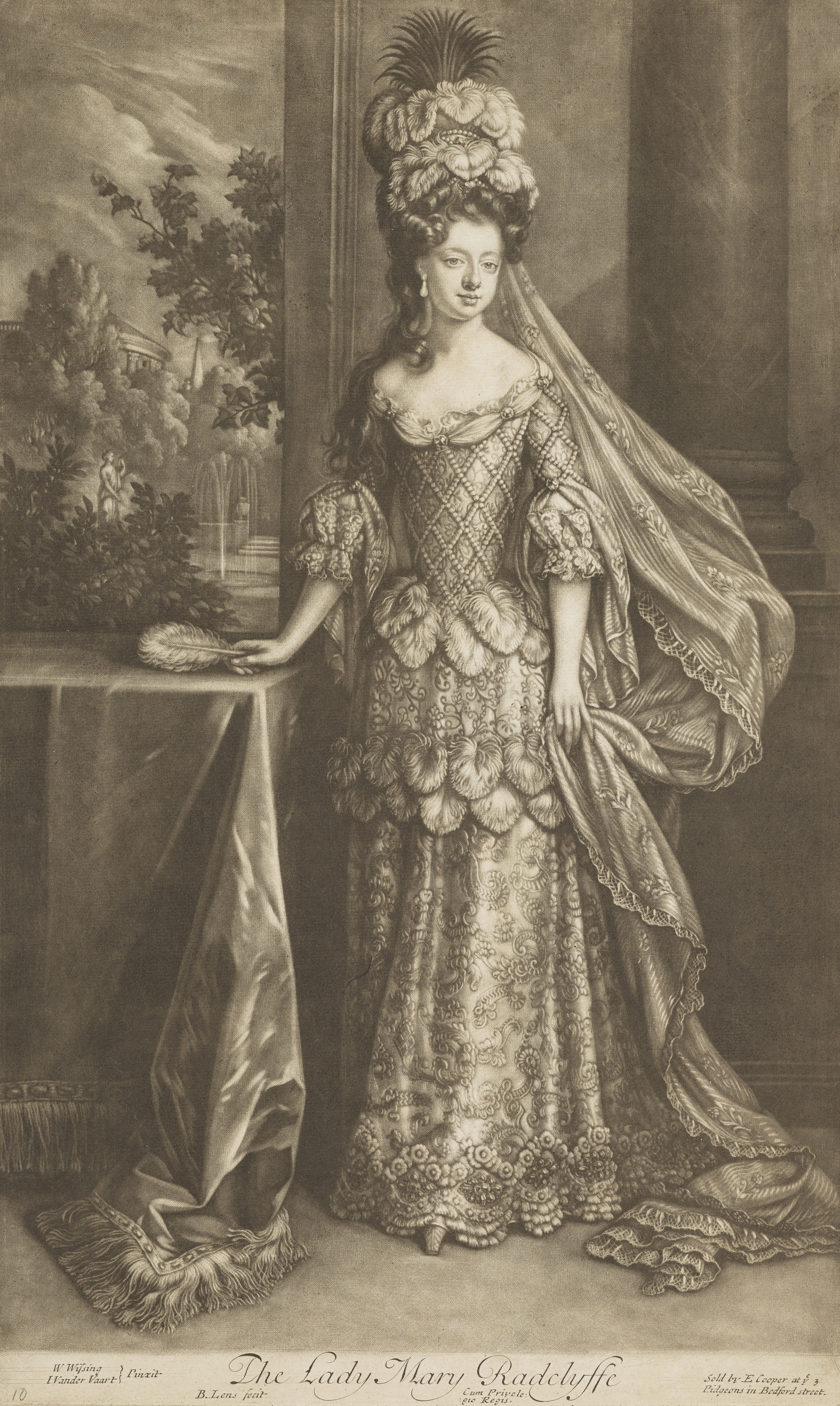
- Painting by Bernard Lens of Lady Mary Radclyffe, Countess of Derwentwater (also known as Mary Tudor)
- Born: 16 October 1673
- Died: 5 November 1726 (aged 53); Paris, France
- Spouses: Edward Radclyffe, 2nd Earl of Derwentwater (m. 1687; died 1705) Henry Graham (m. 1705; died 1707) Major James Rooke (m. 1707)
- Issue: James Radclyffe, 3rd Earl of Derwentwater; Lady Mary Tudor Radclyffe; Charles Radclyffe, 5th Earl of Derwentwater; Hon. Francis Radclyffe; Margaret Frances Disney Rooke
- Father: Charles II of England
- Mother: Moll Davis
- Occupation: Actress

Lady Mary Tudor (16 October 1673 – 5 November 1726), by marriage Countess of Derwentwater, was an actress and illegitimate daughter of King Charles II of England by his mistress, Mary "Moll" Davies, an actress and singer. The King's fourteenth child, she was also his last.

By royal warrants, she was granted the surname Tudor and the precedence of a duke’s daughter, and in 1687, aged 14, she was married to Edward Radclyffe, 2nd Earl of Derwentwater, head of a leading northern Catholic family. Through this marriage, she became the mother of James Radclyffe, 3rd Earl of Derwentwater, executed for his part in the Jacobite rising of 1715, and Charles Radclyffe, later executed after the Jacobite rising of 1745. In the aftermath of James's execution and the forfeiture of the Derwentwater estates, she petitioned the Crown and Parliament for clemency and to secure the conversion of her eight-year-old grandson to the Church of England, an attempt opposed by his mother, Anna Maria Webb, who removed him to the Continent.

== Early life and precedence ==
Arms of Lady Mary Tudor: Royal Arms of Charles II the whole within a bordure a bordure quarterly, 1 and 4 Ermine, 2 and 3 countercompony Argent and Gules

Mary grew up in a house on the south-west side of St James Square, close to St James's Park and Whitehall palace, and from an early age she was surrounded by the high society of The Restoration. Mary followed in her mother's footsteps, and began acting at a young age. She was a part of the many performances put on at Charles II's elaborate court. At age nine, she sang the part of the Roman god of desire, erotic love, attraction and affection, Cupid, alongside her mother, who was starring as Venus, in the play Venus and Adonis.

On 10 December 1680, seven-year-old Mary was, in recognition of her paternity, granted by a Royal warrant, the name Tudor (as a nod to their collateral descent from the Tudor family) and the precedence of the daughter of an Earl. In September 1683, she was issued an annuity of £1,500 (roughly equivalent to £266,447 in 2025), and five months later, on 21 February, her precedence was heightened to that of a daughter of a Duke.

== Marriages and issue ==
=== First marriage ===
On 18 August 1687, Lady Mary married Edward Radclyffe, 2nd Earl of Derwentwater (9 December 1655 – 29 April 1705), son of Francis Radclyffe, 1st Earl of Derwentwater by his wife Catherine Fenwick, daughter of Sir William Fenwick. Her father-in-law was created Earl of Derwentwater in March 1688. The couple divided their time between London, where Lord Derwentwater maintained a house in Arlington Street, and the family seat at Dilston Hall in Northumberland. They had four children:

- James Radclyffe, 3rd Earl of Derwentwater (1689–1716)
- Lady Mary Tudor Radclyffe, who married 1720 to William Petre, Esq. with no issue.
- Charles Radclyffe (3 September 1693 – 8 December 1746)
- Hon. Francis Radclyffe

The marriage was unhappy, however, and Mary formally separated from Lord Derwentwater on 6 February 1700. The exact reason remains unclear; it could be due to her unwillingness to convert to Roman Catholicism or because she was unfaithful, as Thomas Seccombe writes in the Dictionary of National Biography. Edward Radclyffe died on 29 April 1705 at Arlington Street and was buried at Dilston.

Lady Mary Tudor supported her son, James Radclyffe, 3rd Earl of Derwentwater, during and after the 1715 rising by joining petitions for clemency and corresponding with his wife, Anna Maria Webb, as the family managed the aftermath of his conviction and execution. She later sought parliamentary guardianship of her grandchildren to ensure a Protestant upbringing, a move that prompted Anna Maria to remove them to the Continent.

=== Second marriage ===
On 23 May 1705 at Knightsbridge Chapel, Middlesex, shortly after Lord Derwentwater's death, she married secondly, to Henry Graham of Levens, MP for Westmorland. It was later reported that the two had been living together before her husband's death. The marriage caused Graham great trouble, both with his family and with others. Before it, Graham had held an office in the household of Prince George of Denmark, the husband of Queen Anne, but as a result of the wedding he was dismissed from it. Graham died on 7 January 1707. No mention of her is made in her husband's will.

=== Third marriage ===
A few months later, on 26 August 1707 at Twickenham, Middlesex, Lady Mary married Major James Rooke, with whom she had one daughter.

- Margaret Frances Disney Rooke (ca. 1708-1766), married a William Sheldon and had issue.

== Death ==
Lady Mary died in Paris on 5 November 1726, aged 53. Her widowed husband long survived her.
