= Frances Radclyffe =

Frances Radclyffe may refer to:

- Frances Radclyffe, Countess of Sussex nee Sidney (1531–1589), attendant of Elizabeth I
- Lady Frances Radclyffe (died 1602), Maid of Honour to Elizabeth I

== See also ==
- Francis Radclyffe (disambiguation), for the male version of the name
