= Caccia Dominioni =

Caccia Dominioni is a surname. Notable people with the surname include:

- Camillo Caccia Dominioni (1877–1946), Italian cardinal
- Carlo Caccia Dominioni (1802–1866), Italian prelate
- Paolo Caccia Dominioni (1896–1992), Italian soldier
- Luigi Caccia Dominioni (1913–2016), Italian architect and furniture designer
