= James Radclyffe, 3rd Earl of Derwentwater =

English peer

The Right Honourable The Earl of Derwentwater
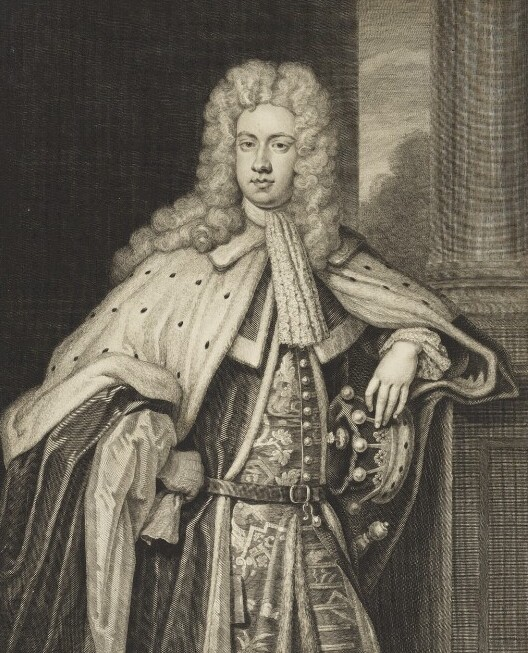
- Born: 26 June 1689; Dilston, Northumberland
- Died: 24 February 1716 (aged 26); Tower Hill, London
- Spouse: Anna Maria Webb
- Children: John Radclyffe; Lady Mary Radclyffe
- Parents: Edward Radclyffe, 2nd Earl of Derwentwater (father); Lady Mary Tudor (mother)

James Radclyffe, 3rd Earl of Derwentwater (26 June 1689 – 24 February 1716) was an English peer who participated in the Jacobite rising of 1715 and was executed for treason.

== Life ==
Radclyffe was the son of Edward Radclyffe, 2nd Earl of Derwentwater and Lady Mary Tudor, the natural daughter of Charles II by Moll Davis. He was brought up at the exiled court of St Germain as a companion to the young prince, James Francis Edward Stuart (the 'Old Pretender' after his father James II died), and remained there at the wish of Queen Mary of Modena, until his father's death in 1705. He succeeded to the family titles and estates in Northumberland on the death of his father in 1705.

After that, he travelled on the continent, sailed from Holland for London in November 1709, and then set out to visit his Cumberland estates for the first time early in 1710. He spent the next two years at Dilston Hall, Northumberland, the mansion built by his grandfather on the site of the ancestral home from 1521; the estates were sequestrated after the Civil War due to the recusancy of his grandfather the first Earl. He regained those and began the construction of a grand mansion to replace the old Hall, a task that was never completed.

=== Jacobite rising of 1715 ===
He joined the conspiracy of 1715; he was suspected by the government of being a Jacobite, and on the eve of the insurrection the secretary of state, Lord Stanhope, signed a warrant for his arrest. A messenger was sent to Durham to secure him, but Radclyffe went into hiding. He heard that Thomas Forster had raised the standard of the Pretender, and Radclyffe joined him at Greenrigg near Edinburgh on 6 October 1715, at the head of a company of gentlemen and armed servants from Dilston Hall. His following, at most 70, was under the immediate command of his brother, Charles Radclyffe. Their plan was to march through Lancashire to Staffordshire, where they looked for support, and the expedition was left mainly in the hands of Colonel Henry Oxburgh, who had served under the Duke of Marlborough in Flanders.

When the rebels occupied Preston, Derwentwater encouraged the men to throw up trenches. The Jacobite army was defeated at the Battle of Preston. Radclyffe acquiesced in Forster's decision to capitulate to the inferior force of General Charles Wills. He was escorted with the other prisoners to London by General Henry Lumley, and lodged in the Devereux tower of the Tower of London, along with the Earls of Nithsdale and of Carnwath, and Lords Widdrington, Kenmure, and Nairne. He was examined before the Privy Council on 10 January 1716, and impeached with the other lords on 19 January. Derwentwater pleaded guilty, urging in extenuation his inexperience, and his advice to those who were about him to throw themselves upon the royal clemency. He was attainted and condemned to death.

Efforts were made to procure his pardon. Petitions were brought before both Houses of Parliament, and an address was carried from the upper house to the throne on 22 February, praying that His Majesty George I of Great Britain would reprieve 'such of the condemned lords as might appear to him deserving of clemency.' Widdrington, Carnwath, and Nairn were reprieved. The countess, accompanied by her sister, their maternal aunt, Anne Brudenell, Duchess of Richmond, the Duchess of Cleveland, and other ladies, was introduced by the Duke of Richmond into the king's bedchamber, where the countess, in French, asked for his majesty's mercy. The king, however, prompted by Robert Walpole (who declared that he had been offered £60,000 to save Derwentwater, but that he was determined to make an example), was obdurate.

=== Execution ===
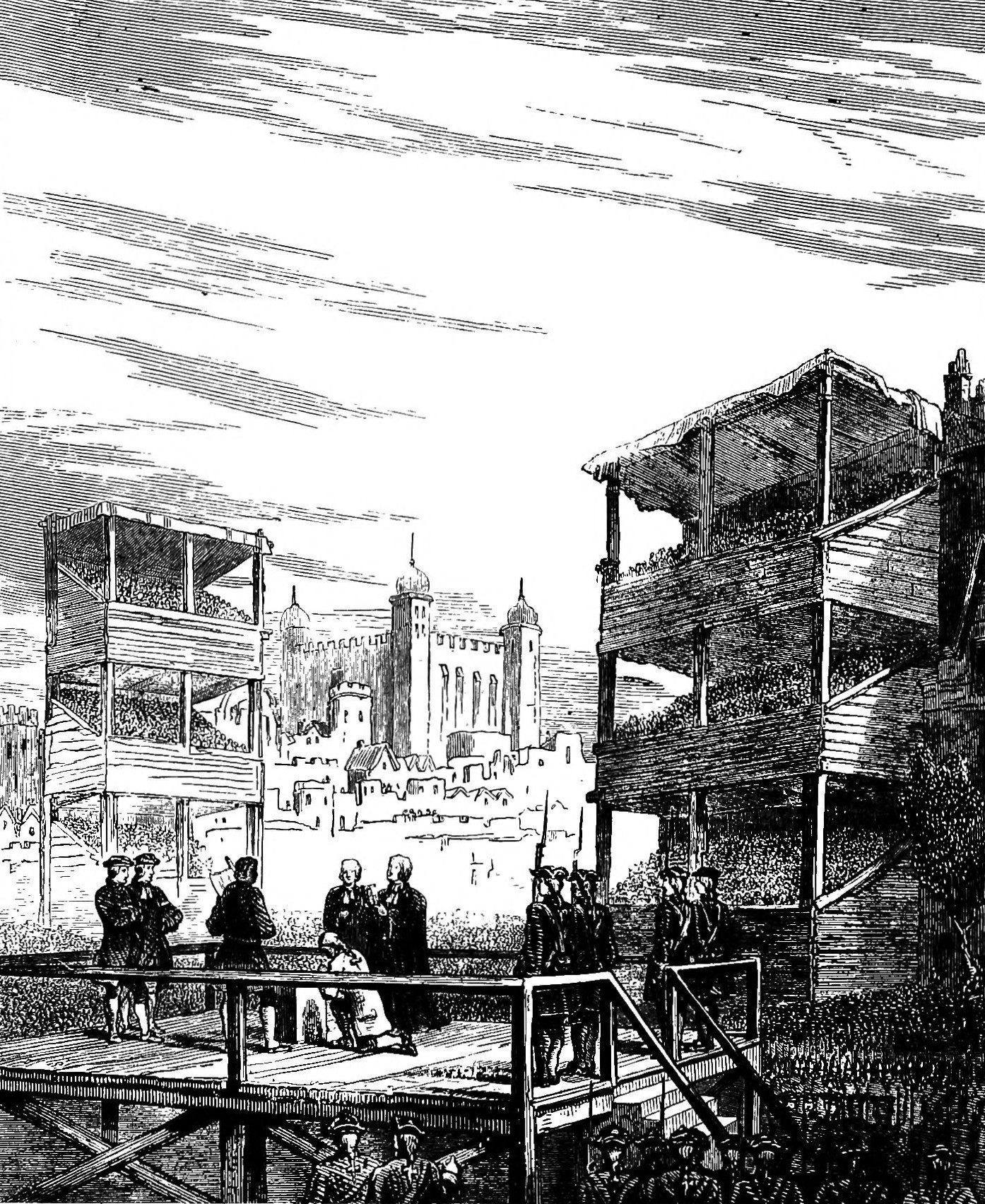
Execution of Lord Derwentwater (by an old print), 1716

Derwentwater was beheaded on Tower Hill on 24 February 1716. On the scaffold, he expressed regret at having pleaded guilty, and declared his devotion to his Roman Catholic religion and to James III. Lord Kenmure suffered at the same time. The Earl of Nithsdale escaped from the Tower the day before. Charles Radclyffe escaped to France but was captured in 1745 on his return to support the 1745 uprising and was executed in 1746. Nairne was still in the Tower of London in 1717, so was able to benefit from the Indemnity Act 1717 and was released.

On the day of his execution, the Northern Lights were said to be unusually bright, and became known as Lord Derwentwater's Lights. His heart was taken to a convent in Paris where the prioress Anne Throckmorton witnessed it being enclosed within the chapel's walls.

Derwentwater was stripped of his honours and titles (but his successors continued to use the titles), and his estates were confiscated. In 1748 Dilston Castle and the rest of the Derwentwater estates were granted by Act of Parliament (22 Geo. 2. c. 56) to the Greenwich Hospital.

== Family ==
Radclyffe married Anna Maria Webb (d. 19 August 1723) on 10 July 1712. She was the eldest daughter of Sir John Webb, 3rd baronet, of Odstock, Wiltshire, by Barbara, daughter and coheiress of John Belasyse, 1st Baron Belasyse.

Their only son John Radclyffe, titular 4th Earl of Derwentwater (1713–1731) succeeded. John is generally accepted to have died at the age of 19 after a cutting for the stone. In the mid-19th century, a woman claiming to be his great-granddaughter and referring to herself as the Countess of Derwentwater made claim upon the Derwentwater estates, but was eventually discredited. She claimed that John had not died in 1731 but had fled to Germany to avoid an attempt on his life by the Hanoverian government.

They also had a daughter, Lady Mary Radclyffe (1714–31 January 1760), who married Robert James Petre, 8th Baron Petre; they had three daughters and one son Robert Petre, 9th Baron Petre.

Lady Derwentwater and her children fled to Brussels in 1721, and she died there of smallpox in 1723.

== Legacy ==
Radclyffe's death is recounted in two English traditional ballads:

- "Lord Derwentwater", collected by Francis James Child and published as Child Ballad 208 in English and Scottish Popular Ballads (1882–98).
- "Lord Allenwater", collected by Ralph Vaughan Williams in 1904 from the singing of Emily Stears.

Radclyffe figures prominently in the historical novels Dorothy Forster by Walter Besant and Devil Water by Anya Seton.

In October 2022, a bedsheet embroidered with human hair, by Radclyffe's wife, in his memory, was displayed at the Museum of London, which acquired it in 1934. The museum stated that the hair "could have come from her own head or that of the earl, or she could have intertwined a combination of the two".

== Notes ==
- Arnold, Ralph (1959). Northern Lights: The Story of Lord Derwentwater. London: The Catholic Book Club.

Peerage of England
| Preceded by Edward Radclyffe | Earl of Derwentwater; 1705–1716 | Attainted |
| Loss of title Attainder | — TITULAR — Earl of Derwentwater; 1716 | Succeeded by John Radclyffe |
