= Jacobite rising of 1715 =

Attempt by the exiled House of Stuart to regain the British throne

The Jacobite Rising of 1715
- Part of Jacobite risings
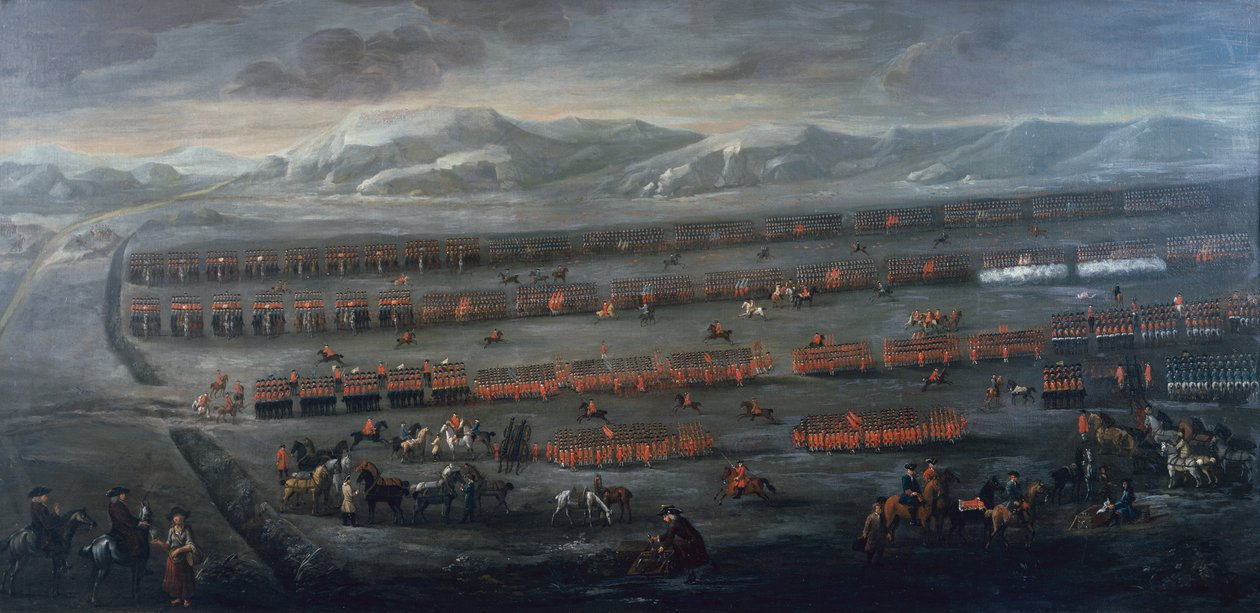
- The Battle of Sheriffmuir, a major battle of the rising
Date	1715–16
Location	Scotland and Northern England
Result	Government victory

Belligerents
Great Britain	Jacobites

Commanders and leaders
Duke of Argyll; Charles Wills; George Carpenter	Earl of Mar; Earl of Strathmore †; Thomas Forster

The Jacobite rising of 1715 (Note: Scottish Gaelic: Bliadhna Sheumais Scottish Gaelic pronunciation: [ˈpliən̪ˠə ˈheːmɪʃ], also known as or The Fifteen) was an attempt by the exiled James Francis Edward Stuart, son of the deposed James II of England, to regain the thrones of England, Scotland and Ireland for the House of Stuart.

The rebellion was officially initiated on 27 August 1715 at Braemar in Aberdeenshire by the Earl of Mar. On 13 November, his forces engaged a government army under the Duke of Argyll at Sheriffmuir. The result was indecisive, and was followed by a Jacobite defeat at Preston in England the next day.

Although James himself landed in Scotland in December 1715, his presence failed to spark popular enthusiasm for the Jacobite cause. He returned to France in February 1716, ending the uprising.

== Background ==
The 1688 Glorious Revolution replaced the Catholic James II and VII with his Protestant daughter Mary II, and her Dutch husband William III, ruling as joint monarchs. Shortly before William's death in March 1702, the Act of Settlement 1701 definitively excluded Catholics from the throne, among them James's son, James Francis Edward Stuart. Since his Protestant half-sister Anne had no surviving children, the Act named her successor as the distantly related, but Protestant, Sophia of Hanover, who died two months before Anne in August 1714. This made Anne's heir presumptive Sophia's eldest son, George I of Great Britain (who had maternal descent from the House of Stuart), and gave the pro-Hanoverian Whigs control of government for the next 30 years.

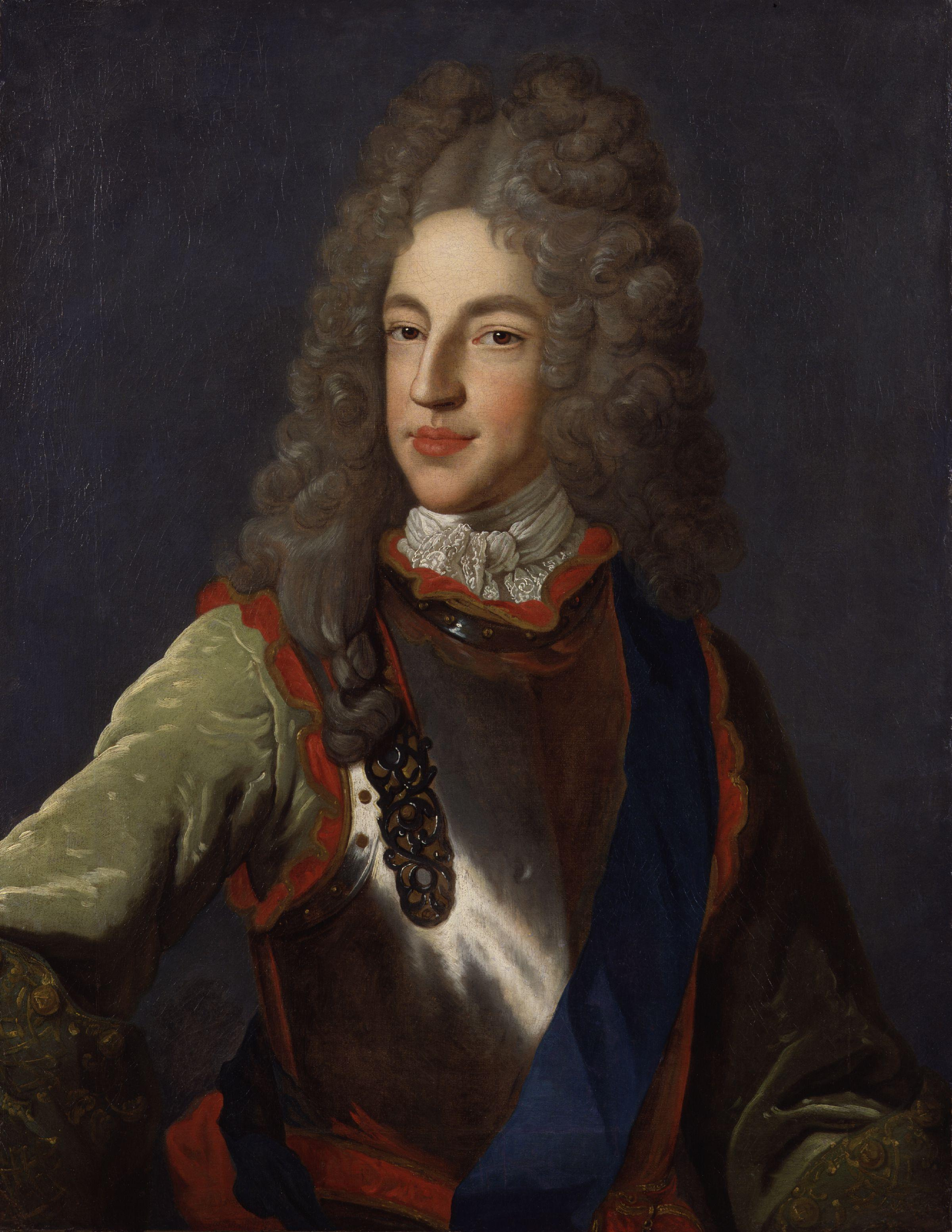
James Francis Edward Stuart, excluded from the Succession by the Bill of Rights 1689

French support had been crucial for the Stuart exiles, but their acceptance of the Protestant succession in Britain was part of the terms that ended the 1701–1714 War of the Spanish Succession. This ensured a smooth inheritance by George I in August 1714, and the Stuarts were later banished from France by the terms of the 1716 Anglo-French Treaty. The 1710–1714 Tory government had actively prosecuted their Whig opponents, who now retaliated, accusing the Tories of corruption: Robert Harley was imprisoned in the Tower of London while Lord Bolingbroke escaped to France and became James' new Secretary of State.

On 14 March 1715, James appealed to Pope Clement XI for help with a Jacobite rising: "It is not so much a devoted son, oppressed by the injustices of his enemies, as a persecuted Church threatened with destruction, which appeals for the protection and help of its worthy pontiff". On 19 August, Bolingbroke wrote to James that "…things are hastening to that point, that either you, Sir, at the head of the Tories, must save the Church and Constitution of England or both must be irretrievably lost for ever". Believing the great general Marlborough would join him, on 23 August James wrote to the Duke of Berwick, his illegitimate brother and Marlborough's nephew, that; "I think it is now more than ever Now or Never".

== Uprising in Scotland ==
Modern recreation of the Flag used by the Jacobites in 1715.

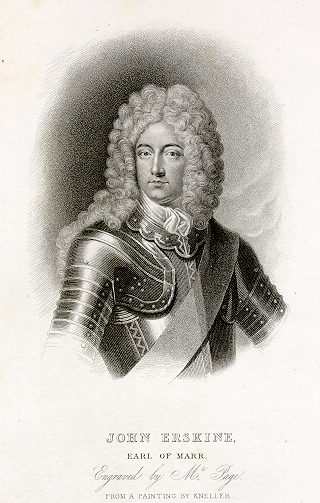
John Erskine, Earl of Mar

Despite receiving no commission from James to start the rising, the Earl of Mar sailed from London to Scotland, and on 27 August at Braemar in Aberdeenshire held a council of war with other Jacobite leaders. On 6 September at Braemar, Mar raised the standard of "James the 8th and 3rd", acclaimed by 600 supporters.

Parliament responded with the passage of a Habeas Corpus Suspension Act permitting the arrest without trial of accused Jacobites, and authorized the seizure and redistribution of their lands in favour of any tenants willing to swear an oath of loyalty to George I. Indeed, records show that at least some of Mar's tenants traveled to London with the hopes of proving their loyalty and receiving parcels of his estate.

In northern Scotland, the Jacobites scored a number of victories. They took Inverness, Gordon Castle, Aberdeen and further south, Dundee, although they were unable to capture Fort William. In Edinburgh Castle, the government stored arms for up to 10,000 men and a sum of £100,000 paid to the Scottish parliament for agreeing to Union with England. Lord Drummond, with 80 Jacobites, tried under the cover of night to take the Castle, using a ladder. However, the ladder proved too short and the men were stranded until early morning, which point they were discovered and arrested.

By October, Mar's force, numbering nearly 20,000, had taken control of all Scotland above the Firth of Forth, apart from Stirling Castle. However, Mar proved an indecisive general, and the Jacobite capture of Perth and the move south by 2,000 men were probably at the initiative of subordinates. Mar's hesitation to commit his forces gave the Hanoverian commander, the Duke of Argyll, precious time to increase his strength with reinforcements from the Irish Garrison.

On 22 October, a commission from James appointed Mar commander-in-chief of the Jacobite army. His forces outnumbered Argyll's Hanoverian army by three to one, and Mar decided to march on Stirling Castle. On 13 November the two forces joined battle at Sheriffmuir. The fighting was indecisive, but near the end the Jacobites numbered 4,000 to Argyll's 1,000. Mar's force began to advance on Argyll, who was poorly protected, but Mar did not close in, possibly believing that he had won the battle already (Argyll had lost 660 men, three times as many as Mar). Instead, the Jacobites retreated to Perth for rest. On the same day as the Battle of Sheriffmuir, Inverness surrendered to Hanoverian forces, and a smaller Jacobite force led by Mackintosh of Borlum was defeated at Preston.

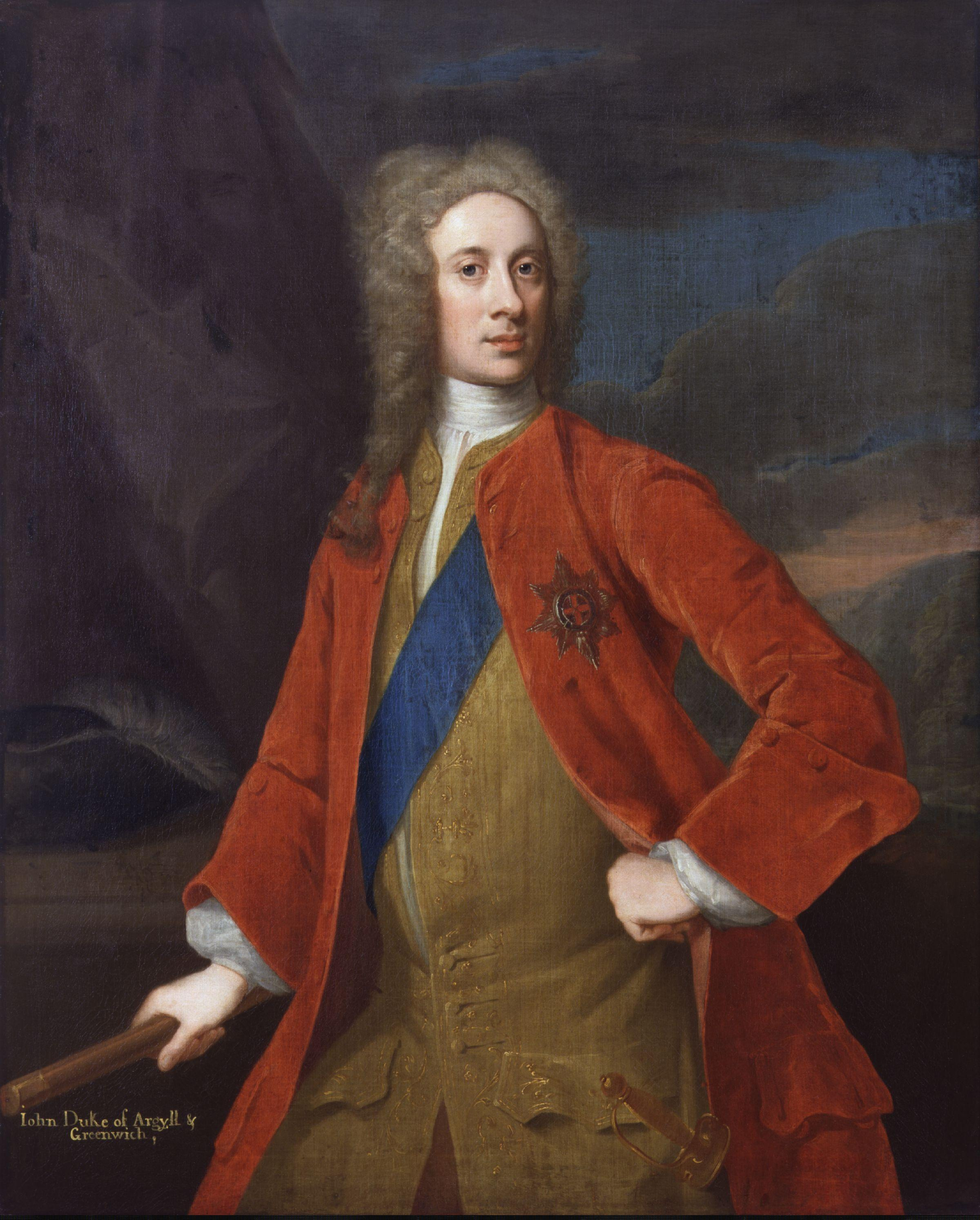
The Duke of Argyll, government commander in Scotland

== Uprising in England ==
Amongst the leaders of a Jacobite conspiracy in western England were three peers and six MPs. The government arrested the leaders, including Sir William Wyndham, on the night of 2 October, and on the following day easily obtained Parliament's legitimation of these arrests. The government sent reinforcements to defend Bristol, Southampton and Plymouth. Oxford, famous for its monarchist sentiment, fell under government suspicion, and on 17 October General Pepper led the dragoons into the city and arrested some leading Jacobites without resistance.

Though the main rising in the West had been forestalled by the preemptive arrest of local Jacobite leaders, a planned secondary rising in Northumberland went ahead on 6 October 1715, involving two peers of the realm, James Radclyffe, 3rd Earl of Derwentwater, and William Widdrington, 4th Baron Widdrington, and a future peer, Charles Radclyffe, later de jure 5th Earl of Derwentwater. Another future English peer, Edward Howard, later 9th Duke of Norfolk, joined the rising later in Lancashire, as did other prominent figures, including Robert Cotton, one of the leading gentlemen in Huntingdonshire.

The English Jacobites joined with a force of Scottish Borderer Jacobites, led by William Gordon, 6th Viscount Kenmure, and this small army received Mackintosh's contingent. They marched into England, where the Government forces caught up with them at the Battle of Preston on 12–14 November. The Jacobites won the first day of the battle, killing large numbers of Government forces, but Government reinforcements arrived the next day and the Jacobites eventually surrendered.

On 15 November 3,000 Dutch troops arrived on the Thames and some time later another 3,000 landed in Hull. With this act of support, the Dutch fulfilled their part of the Barrier Treaty, which stated that the Dutch would provide 6,000 troops to defend the 'Protestant Succession.' This act of friendship forced George I to back the Dutch against the Emperor on the implementation of the Barrier, something George had sought to avoid. With both Maritime Powers drawing a unified line against Austria, the barrier negotiations were quickly concluded to the Dutch Republic's satisfaction. Dutch troops took part in some minor actions in Scotland.

== Aftermath ==
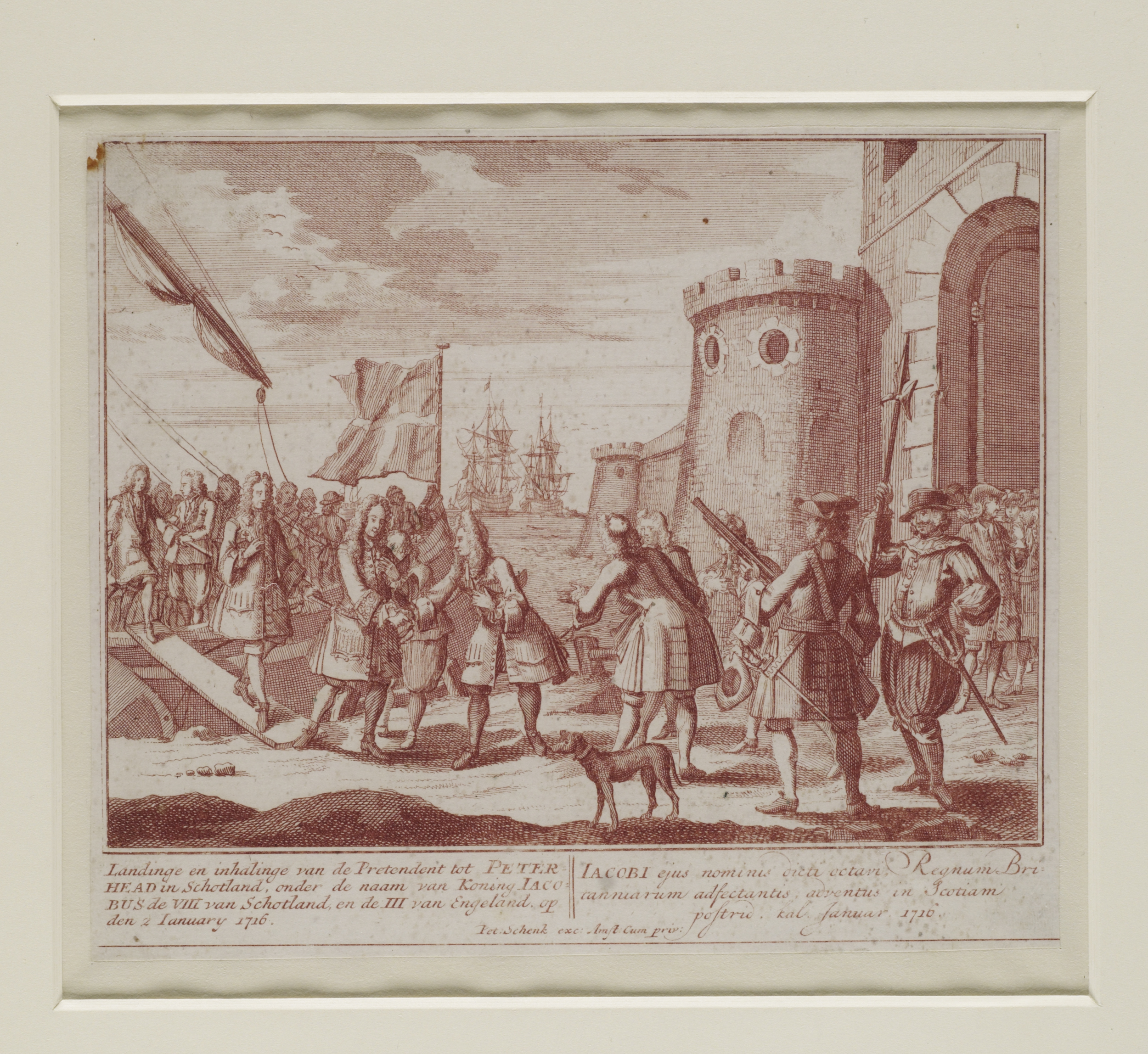
Broadside image: the Pretender, Prince James, Landing at Peterhead on 22 December 1715

On 22 December, James landed in Scotland at Peterhead, but by the time he arrived at Perth on 9 January 1716, the Jacobite army numbered fewer than 5,000. In contrast, Argyll's forces had acquired heavy artillery and were advancing quickly. Mar decided to burn a number of villages between Perth and Stirling to deprive Argyll's army of supplies. On 30 January, Mar led the Jacobites out of Perth; on 4 February James wrote a farewell letter to Scotland, sailing from Montrose the following day.

Many Jacobite prisoners were tried for treason and sentenced to death. On 14 May 1716, Henry Oxburgh was hanged, drawn and quartered at Tyburn. The Indemnity Act of July 1717 pardoned all those who had taken part in the Rising, but the whole of Clan Gregor, including Rob Roy MacGregor, was specifically excluded from the benefits of that Act.

In later years, James, now known as the Old Pretender, made two more attempts at the British throne. In 1719, despite Spanish support, he was again defeated in the Battle of Glenshiel. James's son Charles Edward Stuart, the Young Pretender, attempted to win the throne for his father in 1745, but was defeated at the Battle of Culloden. James died in 1766.

== Sources ==
- John Baynes, The Jacobite Rising of 1715 (London: Cassell, 1970).
- H. T. Dickinson, Bolingbroke (London: Constable, 1970).
- Christoph v. Ehrenstein, 'Erskine, John, styled twenty-second or sixth earl of Mar and Jacobite duke of Mar (bap. 1675, d. 1732)', Oxford Dictionary of National Biography, Oxford University Press, 2004; online edn, January 2008, accessed 20 January 2011.
- George Hilton Jones, The Main Stream of Jacobitism [sic] (Cambridge, MA: Harvard University Press, 1954).
- Wolfgang Michael, England Under George I. The Beginnings of the Hanoverian Dynasty (Westpoint, CT: Greenwood, 1981).
- Jonathan Oates. ‘Dutch forces in eighteenth-century Britain: a British perspective’, Journal of the Society for Army Historical Research 85, No. 341 (Spring 2007): 20–39.
- Stuart Reid, Sheriffmuir 1715. Frontline Books, 2014.
- Van Nimwegen, Olaf (2002). De Republiek der Verenigde Nederlanden als grote mogendheid: Buitenlandse politiek en oorlogvoering in de eerste helft van de achttiende eeuw en in het bijzonder tijdens de Oostenrijkse Successieoorlog (1740–1748) (in Dutch). De Bataafsche Leeuw. ISBN 9789067075404.
