= Moll Davis =

English singer, actress and royal mistress (1640s–1708)

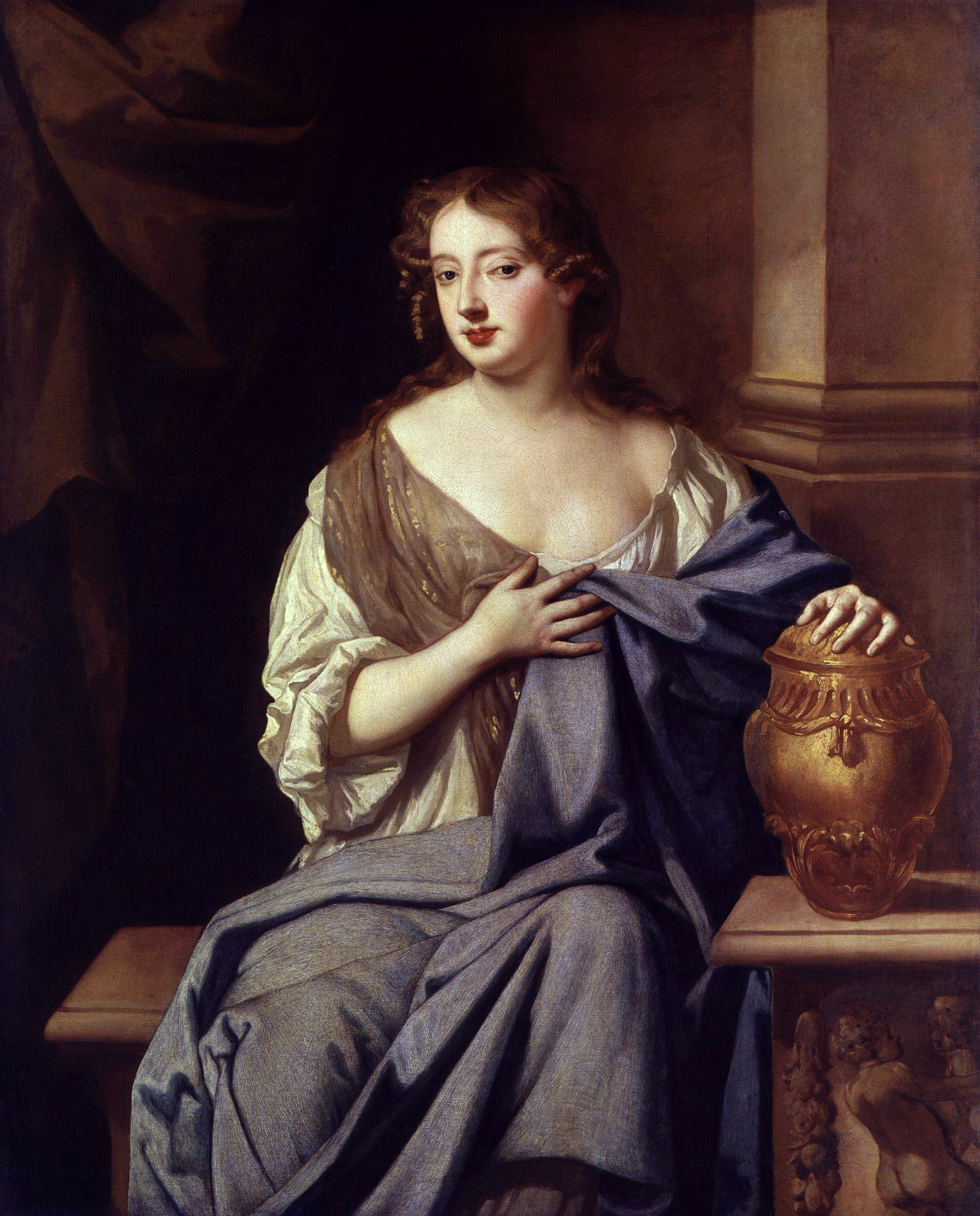
- Portrait after Sir Peter Lely
- Born: c. 1648; Westminster, London, England
- Died: 1708; London, England
- Burial place: St Anne's Church, Soho, London
- Occupations: Courtesan; singer; actress; dancer; comedian
- Spouse: James Paisible (m. 1686)
- Children: Mary, Countess of Derwentwater

Mary "Moll" Davis (c. 1648 – 1708), also spelt Davies or Davys, was a courtesan and mistress of King Charles II of England. She was an actress and entertainer before and during her role as royal mistress.

== Early life ==
Mary Davis was born in Westminster, as a presumed illegitimate child of Thomas Howard, 3rd Earl of Berkshire. The diarist Samuel Pepys called her "a bastard of Collonell Howard, my Lord Barkeshire." Her parentage is also attributed to Thomas's elder brother Charles Howard. Mary's birth date is disputed, but believed to be around 1648.

In 1663 Mary had installed herself as an actress in the Duke's Theatre Company and boarded with the company's manager, Sir William Davenant. There she quickly became a popular singer, dancer and comedian, and began using the name "Moll". Although Pepys wrote good tidings about Moll, his wife Elisabeth called her "the most impertinent slut in the world".

== Royal mistress ==
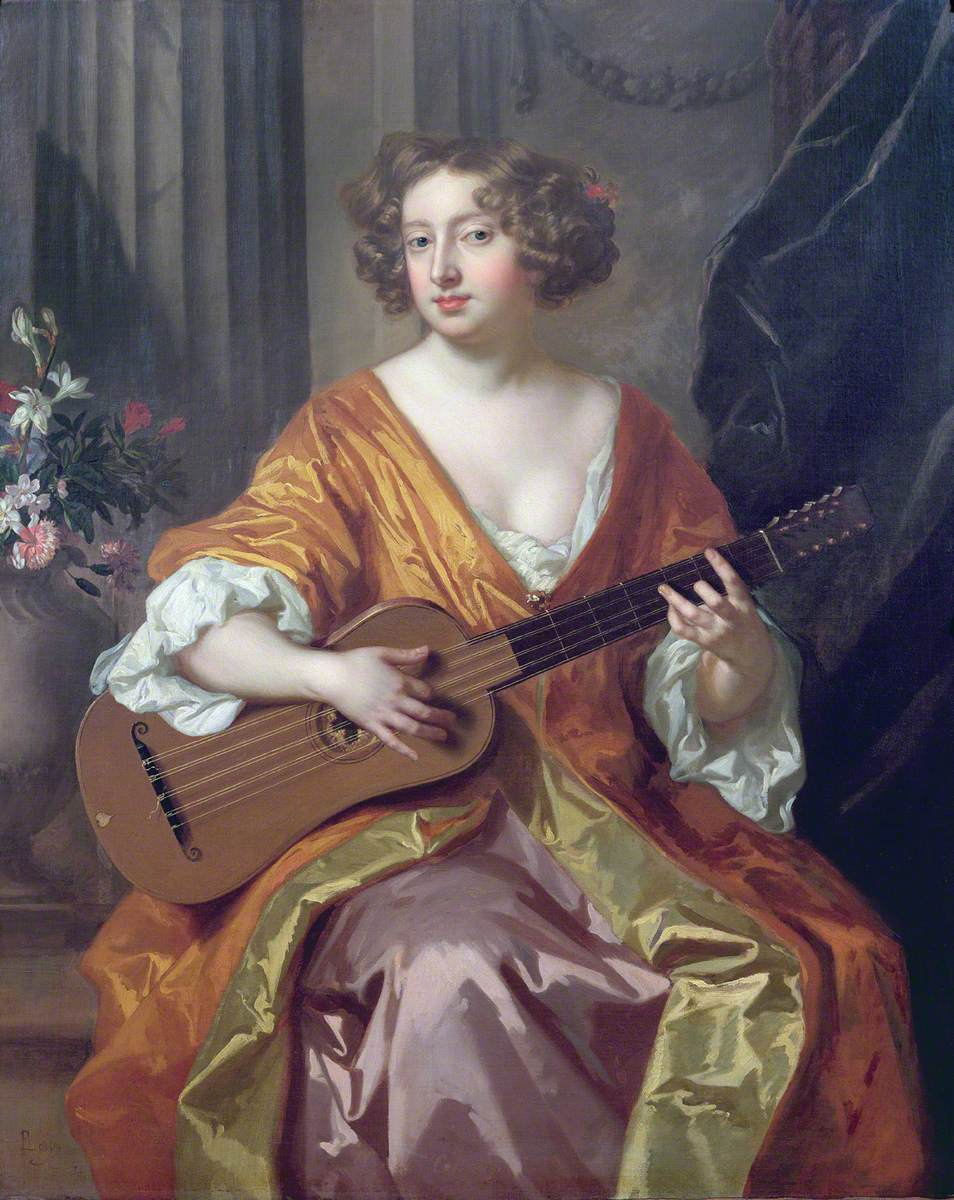
Portrait of Moll Davis, playing the guitar, by Peter Lely

Moll met King Charles II in a theatre or a coffeehouse in 1667, and soon became his mistress. As a mistress, she was said to have flaunted the wealth she acquired from her association with Charles and gained a reputation for vulgarity and greed. She showed off her "mighty pretty fine coach" and a ring worth £600. Moll left the stage in 1668.

=== Fall from affection and exile ===
In 1669 Moll gave birth to a daughter, Mary. King Charles was the father. Shortly after the child's birth, Charles dismissed Moll, possibly due to some chicanery caused by Nell Gwyn, a new rival for his affection. Nell and Moll were such rivals for the king's affection that Nell was said to have purposely dropped a powerful laxative into food Moll was to eat before she was to leave for the king's chamber.

But Moll did not leave empty-handed: Charles awarded her an annual pension for life of £1,000. In January 1667–68, Pepys notes that the king had furnished a house specifically for Moll Davis, writing, "in Suffolke Street most richly, which is a most infinite shame." At the time this street belonged to James Howard, 3rd Earl of Suffolk, a nephew of Thomas Howard, the presumed father of Moll. She is given in the home rate books of 1672–73 but not earlier.

As an actress and society lady, she was the subject of many portraits by the preeminent artist Sir Peter Lely.

==== House in St James's Square ====
In October 1673 Moll Davis bought a new house in St James's Square, paying £1800. Moll, listed as "Madam Davis", first appears in the ratebook for the year 1675 and last in 1687. This house (which John Soane surveyed in 1799) was almost square and had three storeys, each with four evenly spaced windows, all dressed with a wide architrave and cornice. The staircase hall was south of a large room in front, and two smaller rooms and a secondary staircase at the rear. There was a massive cross-wall, containing a few fireplaces. It would be Number 22, St James's Square, if it had survived. It was demolished in 1847 to make way for a new clubhouse for the Army and Navy Club, having survived longer than any other of the square's original houses.

== Marriage ==
In December 1686, Moll married the French musician and composer James Paisible—a member of James II's private musick. Sir George Etherege wrote scornfully of the marriage: "Mrs Davies has given proof of the great passion she always had for music, and Monsieur Peasible has another bass to thrum than that he played so well upon."

The Paisibles joined James' court in exile at St Germain-en-Laye, but in 1693 returned to England, where Paisible became a composer to Prince George of Denmark, the husband of Princess Anne, heir to the throne.

=== Death ===
Moll died in London, at her home in Dean Street, in 1708. She was buried at St Anne's Church in Soho on 24 February.

Moll's daughter, Mary, earned through marriage to Edward Radclyffe, 2nd Earl of Derwentwater the title of Countess, and became an actress herself.
