= Ralph Arnold (publisher) =

British writer and publisher

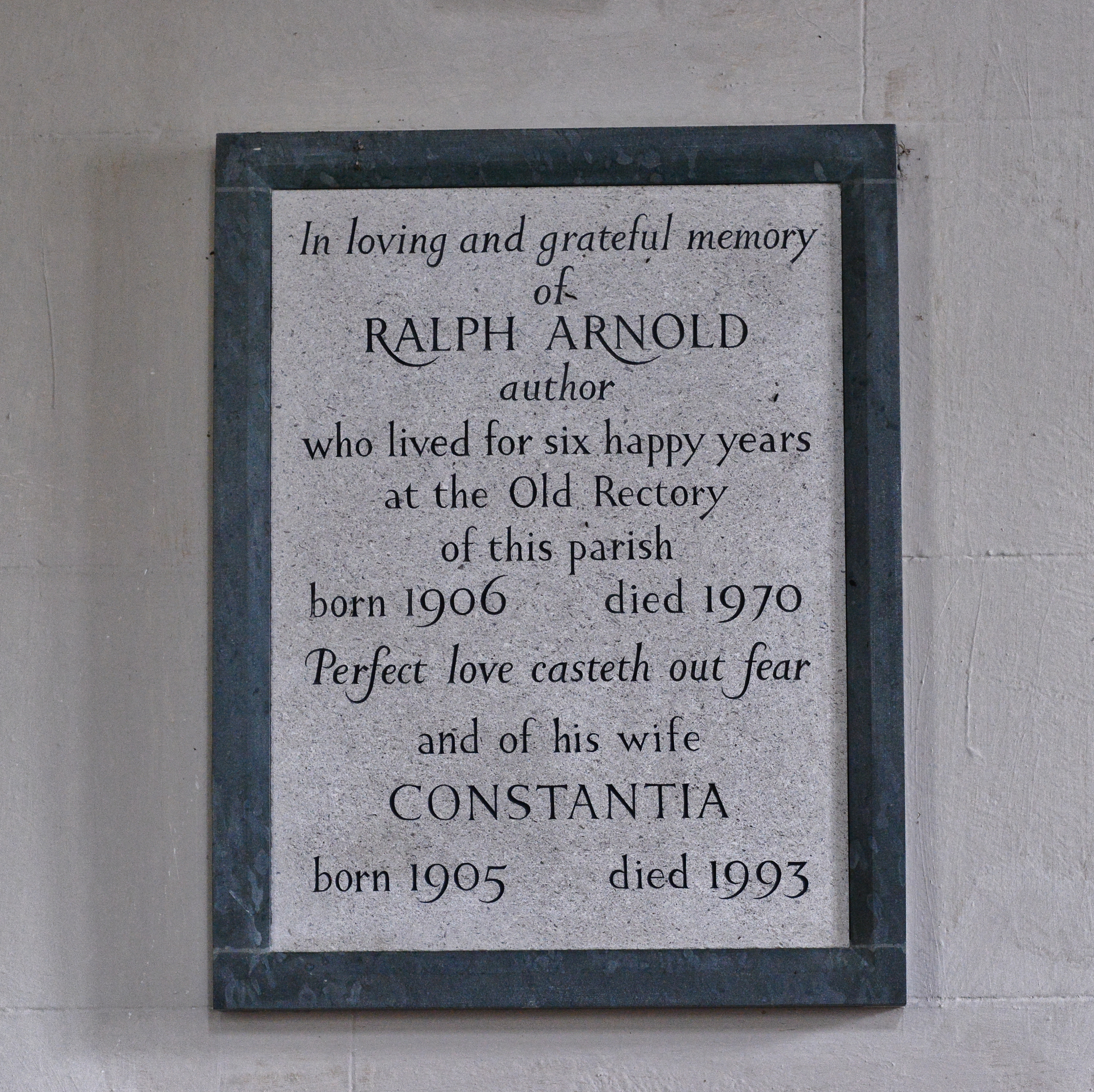
Memorial to Arnold and his wife Constantia, St. Mary's Church, Swerford

Ralph Crispian Marshall Arnold (26 October 1906 – 23 September 1970) was a British novelist, historical writer and (from 1936) publisher with Constable and Co, where he rose to become chairman from 1958 until 1962.

== Education, war and publishing ==
Arnold was born at Meopham Court in Kent, the son of solicitor Robert Anthony Arnold. His literary relatives included poet and journalist Edwin Arnold and the novelist Edwin Lester Arnold. He was educated at the Loretto School in Musselburgh and then at Trinity College Oxford. For a time Arnold also attended the Tennerhof school in Kitzbühel where future authors Ian Fleming and Nigel Dennis were also studying. Arnold kept up a long-standing friendship with Ian's brother Peter Fleming.

He began his working career in 1929 at the Royal Institute of International Affairs (better known today as Chatham House), but joined Constable, the publishers, in 1936. Three years later he enlisted as second lieutenant in the Cameronians. For a year (1939–40) he was personal assistant to Lord Ironside, then Commander-in-Chief, Home Forces (and the model for John Buchan's character Richard Hannay). By the end of the war he had risen to the rank of colonel. His war reminiscences were later published in A Very Quiet War.

After the war Arnold returned to his publishing career at Constable and Co, whose list included Sir Harold Nicolson, Cecil Woodham-Smith, Patrick Hamilton and Bruce Marshall. Constable also published his own books. He was appointed as chairman in 1958 and retired in 1962.

== Writer ==
Arnold's writing followed in the tradition of John Buchan and Dornford Yates, both of whom he admired. He wrote in several genres: light fiction, historical and autobiographical. His first novel, House with the Magnolia, came out in 1931, but most of his writing was produced after the war. The light fiction includes the comedy set in an English village Hands across the Water (1946) and Spring List (1956), about two rival publishers fighting for the war memoirs of a famous general. His lighter works also include detective fiction (Fish and Company, 1951), short stories and adventure books for boys.

As a historical writer Arnold began with local history in his home county of Kent (The Hundred of Hoo, 1947 and A Yeoman of Kent, 1949). In The Unhappy Countess (1957) he told the story of the Bowes-Lyon family, specifically Mary Eleanor Bowes, Countess of Strathmore and Kinghorne. Northern Lights (1959) covered the Earl of Derwentwater and the 1715 Rising, while The Whiston Matter (1961) investigated the factual case of Rochester Cathedral Grammar School headmaster Robert Whiston, used by Trollope as the basis of his novel The Warden. Kings Bishops Knights and Pawns: Life in a Feudal Society, a history book on life in the Middle Ages for young people, was published in 1963 and was commended for the Carnegie Medal. Arnold's A Social History of England 55 B.C. to 1215 A.D. was published in 1967.

On his retirement from publishing, Arnold wrote two autobiographical works: A Very Quiet War (1962) and Orange Street and Brickhole Lane (1963), the latter covering his work at Constable. The firm, he said, "had a strangely endearing persona".

== Personal life ==
Arnold married Constantia Pamela Fenwick (1905–1993) in 1936, the daughter of Mark Fenwick, owner of the country house Abbotswood in Gloucestershire from 1901 until his death in 1945. She was the author of Happy as Kings: The Story of the Fenwicks at Abbotswood 1905 to 1945, published after her death in 1994. They lived at Meadow House in the village of Cobham, Kent, which is described in A Yeoman of Kent. In retirement they moved to Swerford Old Rectory in the Cotswolds.
