= Earl of Derwentwater =

Title in the Peerage of England

Earldom of Derwentwater
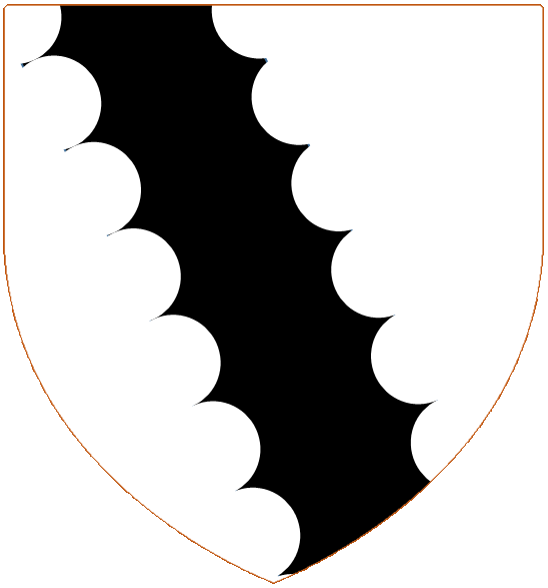
- Argent a Bend engrailed Sable
- Creation date: 1688
- Created by: James II
- Peerage: Peerage of England
- First holder: Francis Radclyffe
- Last holder: James Radclyffe
- Extinction date: 1716

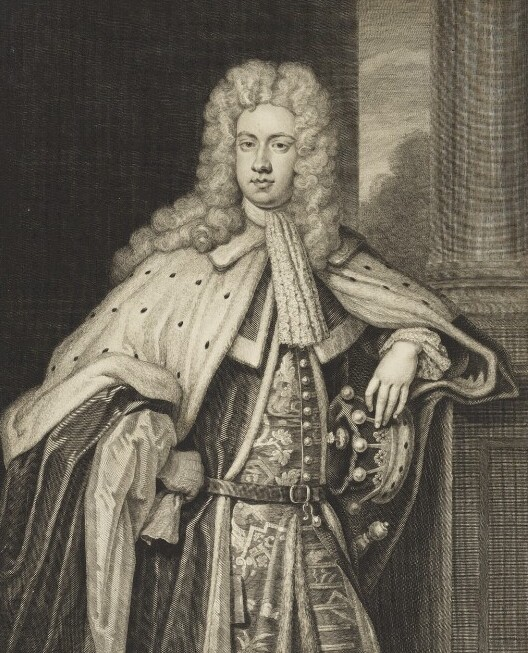
James Radclyffe, 3rd Earl of Derwentwater

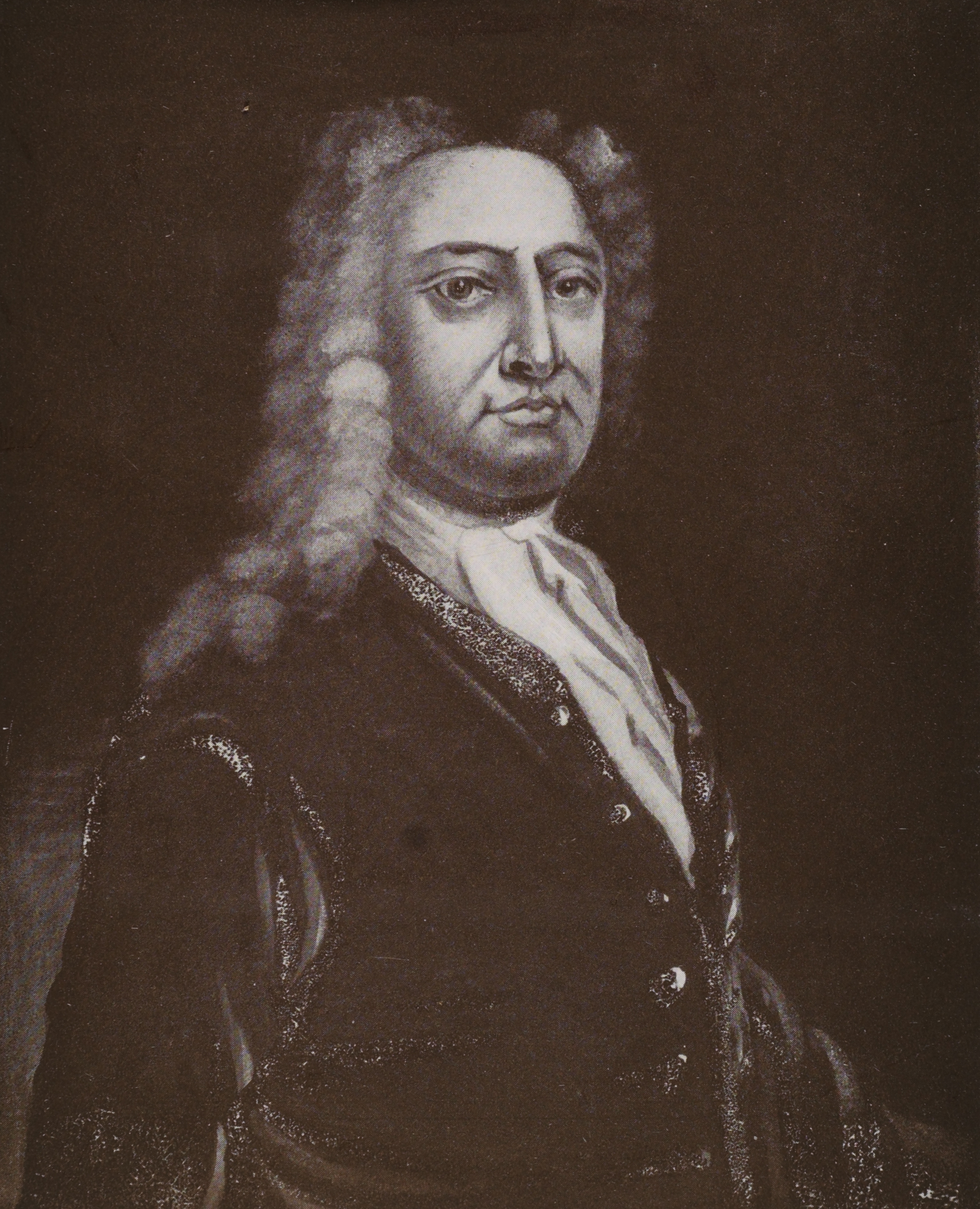
Charles Radclyffe

Earl of Derwentwater (pronounced "Durwentwater") was a title in the Peerage of England. It was created in 1688 for Sir Francis Radclyffe, 3rd Baronet. He was made Baron Tyndale, of Tyndale in the County of Northumberland, and Viscount Radclyffe and Langley at the same time, also in the Peerage of England. He was succeeded by his son, the second Earl, who married Lady Mary Tudor, daughter of Charles II by his mistress Moll Davis.

Their eldest son, the third Earl, was a prominent Jacobite. In 1716, he was convicted of high treason, attainted and executed on Tower Hill in London. Despite having been stripped of his titles through the attainder, his only son John, titular 4th Earl of Derwentwater, continued to use them. On John's early death in 1731, they were claimed by his uncle, Charles Radclyffe, titular 5th Earl. He was also a Jacobite but managed to escape to France after the 1715 rebellion, where he was secretary to Charles Edward Stuart ("Bonnie Prince Charlie"). However, he was captured by British forces in 1746, condemned to death and beheaded. Charles married Charlotte Maria, 3rd Countess of Newburgh. Their eldest son, James, succeeded his mother as 4th Earl of Newburgh and his father as titular 6th Earl of Derwentwater. James's son Anthony succeeded in the titles on his father's death in 1787. The male line died out on his death in 1814, when the Radclyffe titles became technically extinct, and have not been used since; but he was succeeded in the earldom of Newburgh by an Italian kinsman (see Earl of Newburgh for further history of this title). The Baronetcy, of Derwentwater in the County of Cumberland, was created in the Baronetage of England in 1620 for Francis Radclyffe.

== Radclyffe Baronets, of Derwentwater (1620) ==
- Sir Francis Radclyffe, 1st Baronet (1569–1622)
- Sir Edward Radclyffe, 2nd Baronet (1589–1663)
- Sir Francis Radclyffe, 3rd Baronet (1625–1697) (created Earl of Derwentwater in 1688)

== Earls of Derwentwater (1688) ==
- Francis Radclyffe, 1st Earl of Derwentwater (1625–1697)
- Edward Radclyffe, 2nd Earl of Derwentwater (1655–1705)
- James Radclyffe, 3rd Earl of Derwentwater (1689–1716) (forfeit 1716)

== Titular Earls of Derwentwater ==
- John Radclyffe, titular 4th Earl of Derwentwater (1713–1731)
- Charles Radclyffe, titular 5th Earl of Derwentwater (1693–1746)
- James Bartholomew Radclyffe, 4th Earl of Newburgh and titular 6th Earl of Derwentwater (1725–1787)
- Anthony James Radclyffe, 5th Earl of Newburgh and titular 7th Earl of Derwentwater (1757–1814)

There are occasional references to James, the last Earl of Derwentwater, in various 18th Century publications. This is most generally taken to refer to James the 3rd Earl, but each needs to be considered in context as James Bartholomew Radclyffe was the last to use the title as a matter of course, between 1746 when his father Charles Radclyffe was executed and the death of his mother, the suo jure Countess of Newburgh, when James Bartholomew commenced calling himself by the unattainted title, Earl of Newburgh.

== Claimants to the title ==
In 1814, William Radclyffe (1770-1828) of Darley Hall, Worsborough, made claim to be the next legitimate heir to the title. In 1816, it was discovered that Radclyffe, who had in 1803 been appointed as Rouge Croix Pursuivant, a member of the College of Arms, had used his position to alter entries in the Parish Register of Ravensfield to substantiate his false claim. He was found guilty of forgery at York Assizes in March 1820, resigned from the College of Arms in 1823.

In the mid-19th Century the so-called "Mad" Countess of Derwentwater, a woman calling herself Amelia Mary Tudor Radcliffe, took possession of Dilston Castle and claimed that the titular 4th Earl John had not died at age 19, but had faked his own death and relocated to Germany to avoid Hanoverian agents. There he had married and had a family. The "Countess" claimed to be the great-granddaughter of John Radcliffe and for a time gained many followers. Whether her story was true or otherwise, it is certain that she was not a "Countess of Derwentwater" as the title could not be inherited through a female line.

== Estates after the attainder ==
The family estates were not forfeited on the attainder of the 3rd Earl, because his son's right to them under his marriage settlement was established before the Court of Delegates on appeal from the Forfeited Estates Commission, but the forfeiture took effect on his death in 1731. The estates were granted to Greenwich Hospital in 1735. However, after the execution of Charles Ratcliffe in 1746, his son James, Lord Kinnard, claimed them. This claim was compromised by £30,000 being paid to him and his siblings. On his death in 1746, his son obtained an annuity of £2500 for himself and his widow. The estates remained in the hands of the Hospital Commissioners until 1865, when they were transferred by the Greenwich Hospital Act 1865 to the Admiralty Board, who sold them.

== See also ==
- Earl of Newburgh
