= Edward Radclyffe, 2nd Earl of Derwentwater =

English peer

The Earl of Derwentwater
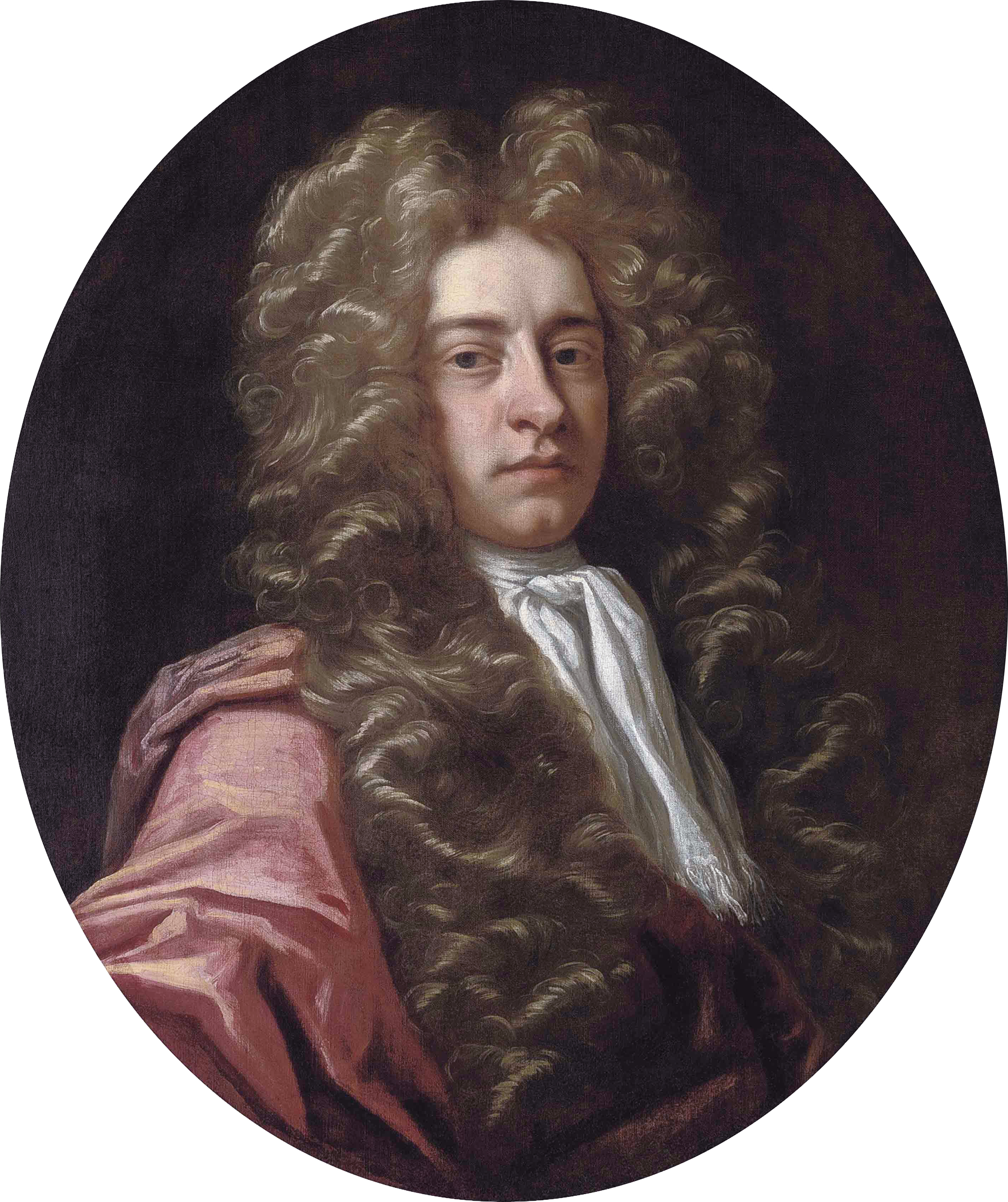
- Edward Radclyffe, 2nd Earl of Derwentwater (by John Baptist Closterman, 1690s)
- Born: 1655
- Died: 29 April 1705 (aged 49–50)
- Spouse: Lady Mary Tudor
- Issue: James Radclyffe, 3rd Earl of Derwentwater; Charles Radclyffe
- Father: Francis Radclyffe, 1st Earl of Derwentwater
- Mother: Catherine Fenwick

Edward Radclyffe, 2nd Earl of Derwentwater (1655 – 29 April 1705) was an English peer, styled Viscount Radclyffe from 1688 to 1695.

He inherited the earldom from his father, Francis Radclyffe, 1st Earl of Derwentwater in 1697. His mother was Catherine Fenwick, daughter of Sir William Fenwick. On 18 August 1687, he married Lady Mary Tudor, the natural daughter of King Charles II.

Their children were:

- James Radclyffe, 3rd Earl of Derwentwater (1689–1716)
- Hon. Francis Radclyffe (2 February 1691 – 15 May 1715)
- Hon. Charles Radclyffe (1693–1746)
- Lady Mary Tudor Radclyffe (6 October 1697 – 16 March 1756)

The marriage was unhappy. (Thomas Seccombe, writing in the Dictionary of National Biography, says that Mary was unfaithful). The couple separated in 1700.

Peerage of England
Preceded by Francis Radclyffe	Earl of Derwentwater; 1697–1705	Succeeded by James Radclyffe
