= Francis Radclyffe, 1st Earl of Derwentwater =

English peer

Francis Radclyffe, 1st Earl of Derwentwater (1625 – April 1697), of Dilston Castle was an English peer and member of the House of Lords. His wife was Catherine Fenwick, daughter of Sir William Fenwick and widow of Henry Lawson. They had five sons and four daughters.

He was the eldest son of Sir Edward Radclyffe, 2nd Baronet of Dilston Castle, and his wife Elizabeth Barton. He was created Earl of Derwentwater, Viscount Radclyffe, and Baron Tyndale on 7 March 1688. He was succeeded by his eldest son Edward Radclyffe, 2nd Earl of Derwentwater, who married Lady Mary Tudor, natural daughter of Charles II.

Peerage of England
New creation	Earl of Derwentwater; 1688–1697	Succeeded by Edward Radclyffe
Baronetage of England
Preceded by Edward Radclyffe	Baronet (of Derwentwater); 1663–1697	Succeeded by Edward Radclyffe
