= James Scully (GC) =

Irish soldier (1909-1974)

James Patrick Scully, GC
- Scully in military uniform
- Born: 20 October 1909; Crumlin, County Dublin, Ireland
- Died: 28 December 1974 (aged 65); Hebburn-on-Tyne, England (Note: His place of death is variously reported as Hebburn and South Shields. One possibility is that he collapsed at his nephew's house in Hebburn and was pronounced dead at the nearest hospital, South Tyneside District Hospital in South Shields.)
- Burial place: Streatham Cemetery, London; 51.433455°N 0.174450°W
- Spouse: Mary Scully
- Children: 1 son 5 daughters
- Relatives: Brendan Foster MBE (nephew)
- Military career
- Allegiance: United Kingdom
- Branch: British Army
- Service years: 1941–1943
- Rank: Acting Corporal
- Service number: 13039555
- Units: 256 Company, Pioneer Corps
- Conflicts: World War II
- Awards: George Cross
- Other work: Member of The Royal Society of St George

James Patrick Scully, GC (20 October 1909 – 28 December 1974) was an Irishman who served in the Royal Pioneer Corps of the British Army during World War II and was awarded the George Cross, the United Kingdom's highest award for civilian gallantry and for military gallantry outside combat. He is the only member of the Corps to have won that distinction.

== Early life ==
He was born in Crumlin, a suburb of Dublin, to Thomas and Bridget Scully (née O’Shaughnessy). He had two brothers and five sisters. After a basic education in Dublin, he moved to London in 1925 at the age of 16 to seek work, and gained employment as a labourer.

== Pioneer Corps ==
In January 1941, he volunteered for the British Army, and was assigned to 256 Company, Royal Pioneer Corps, which was deployed to Birkenhead, Merseyside. On the night of 13–14 March 1941, (Note: Some sources give the date as 8 March. This seems unlikely, because Birkenhead was bombed on the nights of 24–25 February and 12-13 and 13–14 March 1941 but not in between, nor during the daytime as is implied by a single date. The error may have arisen by confusion between the date of the action and that of the award (8 July).) that town was subjected to heavy bombing by the Luftwaffe (a part of what was to become known as the Liverpool Blitz). It was then he performed the deed which won him the George Cross, by sheer determination and physical strength protecting a couple trapped in a ruined house from collapsing masonry while rescue workers laboured for over seven hours to clear the rubble. All three survived. In May 1943, he was discharged on medical grounds as unfit for further service, in consequence of injuries received during his medal recipient action.

== George Cross ==
Scully was recommended for the George Cross by the Chief Constable and the Mayor of Birkenhead. The citation was published in the London Gazette on 8 July 1941, and reads:

King George VI of the United Kingdom has been graciously pleased to approve the award of the GEORGE CROSS, to:-

No. 13039555 Acting Corporal James Patrick Scully, Royal Pioneer Corps. (Crunslin [sic], Co. Dublin.)

Awarded the George Medal.

Lieutenant Charles Cummins Chittenden (163280), Royal Pioneer Corps.

When houses were demolished by enemy action, a rescue party under the direction of Lieutenant Chittenden went to the incident and a search was made for trapped people.

Corporal Scully located a man and a woman, and with great difficulty, he managed to penetrate the debris and get to where they were buried. Lieutenant Chittenden followed him. Wood was obtained to use as props to shore up the debris, but there was no means of cutting it into proper lengths.

A rescue party then arrived with tools to cut some wood into more suitable lengths for shoring. All available help was mustered and the men worked tremendously hard in their efforts to clear away the wreckage. Corporal Scully remained with the trapped persons and prevented any more debris falling on them. A long plank was inserted to take most of the weight but as the result of further falls the props began to sway out of position. There was then a very real danger of the mass of debris falling down and burying the injured persons. Realising this, Corporal Scully placed his back under the plank to try to prevent the props from giving way completely. He steadied them for a time but gradually the weight increased until the props slipped. This left Corporal Scully holding one end of the plank and Lieutenant Chittenden supporting the other. Corporal Scully could have got away at this stage, but he knew that if he did so the debris would fall and probably kill the trapped persons, so he stayed under the plank. Gradually the weight increased and forced Corporal Scully down until he lay across the trapped man. Lieutenant Chittenden who was still holding one end of the plank reached over and supported Corporal Scully's head to prevent him from being suffocated by having his head pressed into the debris. He managed to keep Corporal Scully's face clear, but he was fast becoming exhausted. Despite this, he kept up his spirits and continued to talk encouragingly to the woman. The man was unconscious nearly all this time. Corporal Scully remained in this position throughout the night until, more than seven hours later, the rescue party were able to rescue him and the casualties.

When they first entered the house. Lieutenant Chittenden and Corporal Scully knew there was a grave risk of injury or death as the high walls nearby appeared about to collapse at any moment. Had this collapse occurred, they would have been buried under many tons of debris. Corporal Scully risked his life to save the two people and, though the position looked hopeless, Lieutenant Chittenden stayed with him.

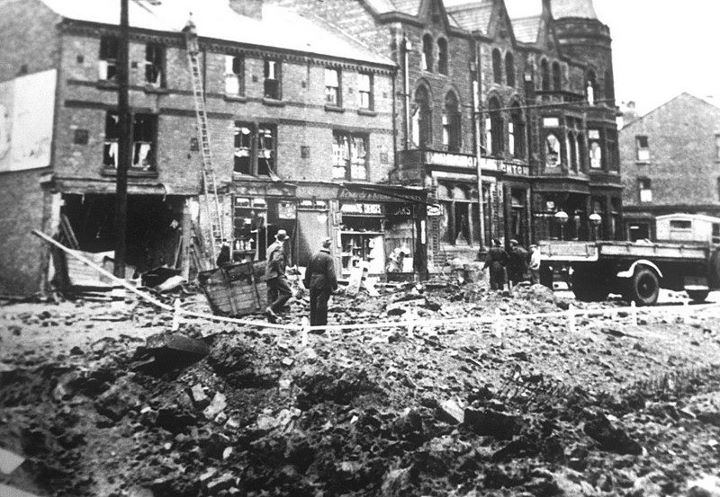
Scenes opposite the town hall (Wallasey) after the Merseyside/Liverpool Blitz.

When the Commanding Officer of 46 Group, Pioneer Corps, Temple Gray, learned from G.O.C. Western Command of the approval of the award, he took swift action, as recounted by Marion Hebblethwaite in One Step Further - The George Cross:

'I then heard that Scully was to be presented to the King so I arranged for him to be fitted out by a skilled tailor. He was taken by a Sergeant to Liverpool and put on a train to London.

There he was met by an R.S.M. from the Brigade of Guards who took him to the War Office. Here he was quizzed by a number of Generals before being taken into a room and fitted with a new outfit supervised by two tailors.

The R.S.M. then gave him a light lunch in a Whitehall restaurant with no alcohol and they were driven to Buck House. He was taken up to see King George VI, who asked him to sit down, was very kind, listened to his story and pinned the George Cross on him remarking that it was only the second one to be awarded. With his escort, he then had an enormous high tea and was taken to a cinema; after a few drinks he was put on the train to Liverpool thoroughly bewildered by his crowded day. Warned by a message of his E.T.A., an escort of a Sergeant and four men was arranged to meet him, as it was thought his "Irish temperament" might have caused trouble but on arrival he was sound asleep'.

Scully was commemorated by a sculpture at Simpson Barracks, Northamptonshire. Scully Troop of the Royal Logistic Corps is named after him. (Note: The Royal Logistic Corps was formed in 1993, and among other former units incorporates the Royal Pioneer Corps.) He is among those portrayed in a painting by Anthony Richard Grenville Cowland titled The Fighting Pioneer which was commissioned to commemorate the final removal in 2014 of the Royal Pioneer Corps from the British Army Order of Battle.

== Later life and death ==
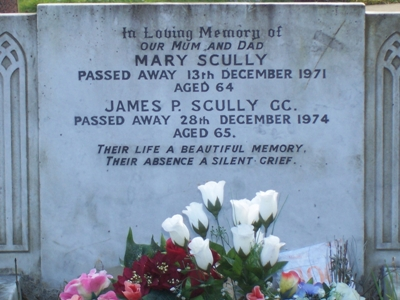
Scully's grave in Tooting

After the War, Scully became a painter and decorator, and raised a son and five daughters with his wife, Mary. On 28 December 1974, he collapsed at the home of his nephew Brendan Foster, the Olympic runner and BBC commentator, in Hebburn-on-Tyne, and died. He was buried in Streatham Cemetery in Tooting, London Borough of Wandsworth alongside his wife, who had died on 13 December 1971.

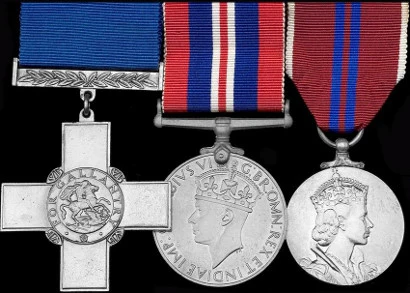
Scully's medals (left to right): George Cross, War Medal 1939–1945, Queen Elizabeth II Coronation Medal

From 1975, his medals (which also included the War Medal 1939–1945 and the Queen Elizabeth II Coronation Medal of 1953) were displayed in the Royal Logistic Corps Museum in Camberley, Surrey. In 2011, his family put his medal group and other memorabilia, including the cover feature of boys' magazine The Hornet of January 1967 which features his exploits, up for auction. The lot was sold on 5 July 2011 for £72,000, a then-record sum, to an anonymous bidder. The buyer later revealed himself to be Lord Ashcroft, and the medal group has since been on display in rotation as part of the Lord Ashcroft Collection in the Imperial War Museum.

== See also ==
- List of George Cross recipients
- Francis George Miles VC, who was conferred the Victoria Cross serving with The Gloucestershire Regiment in World War I and served with the Pioneer Corps in World War II
