= Francis Miles (disambiguation) =

Francis Miles (1896–1961) was an English VC recipient.

Francis or Frank Miles may also refer to:

- Frank Miles (1852–1891), British artist
- Francis Mylles (fl. 1588), MP for Winchester (UK Parliament constituency)
