= 2nd Gloucestershire Rifle Volunteers =

2nd Gloucestershire Rifle Volunteers 2nd Volunteer Battalion, Gloucestershire Regiment 5th Battalion, Gloucestershire Regiment A (Gloucester) Company, Wessex Regiment
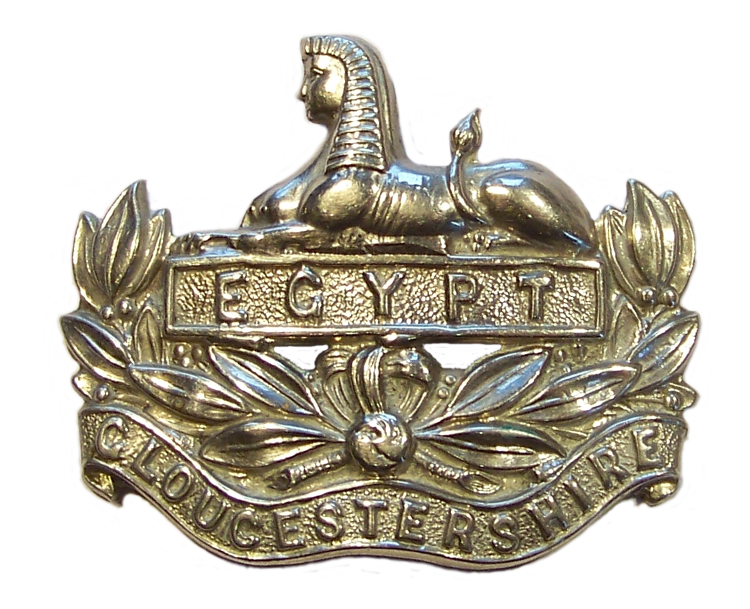
- Cap badge of the Gloucestershire Regiment
- Active: 21 October 1859–1 July 1999
- Country: United Kingdom
- Branch: Volunteer Force/Territorial Army
- Role: Infantry
- Size: 1–3 Battalions
- Part of: 48th (South Midland) Division; 61st (2nd South Midland) Division
- Garrison/HQ: The Barracks, Brunswick Road, Gloucester; Drill Hall, Painswick Road, Gloucester
- Engagements: World War I: Battle of the Somme; Third Battle of Ypres; Battle of the Asiago; Defence of Holnon Wood; Battle of the Sambre, World War II: Defence of Ledringhem

Insignia
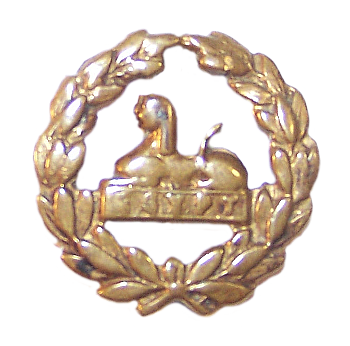
- The Glosters' Back badge

The 2nd Gloucestershire Rifle Volunteers was a volunteer unit of the British Army, which recruited in Gloucestershire from 1859. After becoming a Volunteer, and then later, a Territorial battalion of the Gloucestershire Regiment (the 'Glosters'), it fought on the Western Front and in Italy during World War I. Its 1st Line battalion fought a last-ditch defensive action at the Piave and one of its number won a Victoria Cross in the closing weeks of the war. The 2nd Line battalion was involved in an epic rearguard action at Holnon Wood during the German spring offensive. In the early part of World War II the battalion distinguished itself at the defence of Ledringhem before being evacuated from Dunkirk. It then served as a unit of the Reconnaissance Corps with 43rd (Wessex) Infantry Division through the campaign in North West Europe. It returned to the Glosters in the postwar Territorial Army until amalgamated with other units in 1967.

== Volunteer Force ==
An invasion scare from France in 1859 led to the emergence of the Volunteer Movement, and Rifle Volunteer Corps (RVCs) began to be organised throughout Great Britain to supplement the Regular Army and Militia. The City of Bristol Rifles raised on 13 September 1859 became the 1st Gloucestershire RVC, and soon grew to be an independent battalion-sized unit. The remaining Gloucestershire RVCs were all company-sized or smaller units:

- 2nd (Gloucester Docks Company) Gloucestershire RVC, raised 21 October 1859 under Captain William Vernon Guise (later Sir William Guise, 4th Baronet)
- 3rd (Gloucester City) Gloucestershire RVC, raised 21 October 1859 under Capt Thomas de Winton
- 4th (Stroud) Gloucestershire RVC, raised 5 September 1859 under Capt Henry Daniel Cholmeley, disbanded by August 1861
- 5th (Stroud) Gloucestershire RVC, raised 6 September 1859 under Capt J. Watts Haliwell
- 6th (Stroud) Gloucestershire RVC, raised 7 September 1859 under Capt John Dutton Hunt, absorbed into 1st Gloucestershire Light Horse Volunteers and 5th Gloucestershire RVC in 1865
- 7th (Cheltenham) Gloucestershire RVC, raised 20 September 1859 under Capt Robert Dwarris Gibney, disbanded September 1864
- 8th (Tewkesbury) Gloucestershire RVC, raised 6 December 1859 as a half company under Lieutenant James Primatt Sargeaunt, raised to a full company 7 November 1860, disbanded 1876–7
- 9th (Cirencester) Gloucestershire RVC, raised 13 February 1860 under Capt Allen Alexander Bathurst (later 6th Earl Bathurst)
- 10th (Cotswold Rifles) Gloucestershire RVC at Cheltenham, raised 1 March 1860 under Capt Herbert W. Wood
- 11th (Dursley) Gloucestershire RVC, raised 9 March 1860 under Capt John Vizard
- 12th (Forest of Dean) Gloucestershire RVC, raised 21 April 1860 under Capt Sir Martin Hyde Crawley–Boevey, 4th Baronet
- 13th (Odd Fellows – Cheltenham) Gloucestershire RVC, raised 23 March 1860 under Capt Edmund P, Morphy, disbanded 1874
- 14th (Cheltenham) Gloucestershire RVC, raised 3 July 1860 under Capt Sir Alex Ramsay, disbanded September 1864
- 15th (Stow-on-the-Wold) Gloucestershire RVC, raised 3 December 1860 as a subdivision under Lt Cecil C.V.N. Pole; brought up to a full company in December 1868
- 16th (North Cotswold Rifles) Gloucestershire RVC at Moreton-in-Marsh, raised 23 November 1860 under Capt Sir John Maxwell Steele-Graves, 4th Baronet, moving to Chipping Campden in 1862

A number of the original officers of these RVCs had previous military experience, for example, Ensign Theodore Preston of the 2nd RVC was formerly in the 43rd Foot, Capt Sir William Vernon Guise in the 75th Foot, Capt de Winton of the 3rd RVC in the Royal Artillery, Capt Bathurst of the 9th RVC in the North Gloucestershire Militia, Capt Wood of the 9th RVC as a lieutenant-colonel in the 4th Madras Native Infantry, Lt Shapland Swiny of the 9th RVC as a captain in the Royal Dublin City Militia, Capt Sir Martin Crawley-Boevey of the 12th RVC as a captain in the Royal Gloucestershire Hussars and Capt Morphy of the 13th RVC in the Monaghan Militia. The Honorary Chaplain of the 11th (Dursley) RVC was the Rev Sir George Prevost, 2nd Baronet, son of Lt-Gen Sir George Prevost and Rural dean of Dursley.

These independent RVCs were grouped into two administrative battalions in 1860:

- 1st Administrative Battalion, Headquarters (HQ) at Gloucester: 2nd, 3rd, 4th, 5th, 6th, 8th, 9th, 11th, 12th, 15th, 16th RVCs (the 1st Gloucester Light Horse Volunteers, formed at Stroud on 19 May 1860 and disbanded in 1866, and the 1st Gloucestershire Engineer Volunteer Corps formed at Gloucester on 28 January 1861, left in 1867, were also attached to this battalion.). Colonel William Purnell, CB, formerly of the 90th Light Infantry, was commissioned as the battalion's commanding officer (CO) on 3 March 1860.
- 2nd Administrative Battalion, HQ at Cheltenham: 7th, 10th, 13th, 14th RVCs

However, the 2nd Admin Battalion was disbanded by January 1864 and its remaining RVCs joined the 1st Admin Battalion. A new 14th (City of Gloucester Rifles) Gloucestershire RVC was formed in 1874–5 but was later absorbed into the others. When the RVCs were consolidated in 1880, the 1st Admin Bn became the 2nd Gloucestershire RVC.

The Cheltenham College Cadet Corps was affiliated to the battalion from 1867 to 1889, and again from 1904. Gloucester County School at Hempstead contributed a cadet company from 1889 to 1891, and Cirencester School from 1896 to 1897.

Under the 'Localisation of the Forces' scheme introduced by the Cardwell Reforms of 1872, Volunteers were grouped into county brigades with their local Regular and Militia battalions – Brigade No 37 (Gloucestershire) in Western District for the 1st Gloucestershire Admin Battalion. The Childers Reforms of 1881 took Cardwell's reforms further, and the Volunteers were formally affiliated to their local Regular regiment, the Gloucestershire Regiment ('Glosters') in the case of the Gloucestershire RVCs, and on 1 May 1883 the 2nd changed its title to 2nd Volunteer Battalion, Gloucestershire Regiment. When a comprehensive mobilisation scheme for the Volunteers was established after the Stanhope Memorandum of 1891, the 2nd VB of the Gloucesters was assigned to the Western Counties Brigade at Bath, Somerset, changing to the Gloucester and Somerset Brigade in 1901–2. The Volunteer Infantry Brigades were reorganised in 1906–07, when all the Gloucester Regiment VBs were assigned for training to the Portland Brigade, defending the Royal Navy's base at Portland Harbour.

Service companies from the regiment's volunteer battalions served with the Regular 2nd Bn in the Second Boer War, gaining the 2nd VB its first Battle honour: South Africa 1900–1902.

== Territorial Force ==
When the Volunteers were subsumed into the new Territorial Force (TF) under the Haldane Reforms of 1908, the battalion became the 5th Battalion, Gloucestershire Regiment, with the following organisation:

- Battalion HQ at The Barracks (also known as the Drill Hall) in Brunswick Road, Gloucester
- A & B Companies at Brunswick Road
- C Company at Drill Hall, Bath Street, Stroud
- D Company at Drill Hall, Back of Avon, Tewkesbury
- E & F Companies at Drill Hall, North Street, Cheltenham
- G Company at Drill Hall, Boulton Lane, Dursley
- H Company at The Armoury, Chipping Campden

The Cheltenham College Cadet Corps became a contingent of the junior division of the Officers' Training Corps.

Major the Hon Benjamin Bathurst, (former and future MP for Cirencester), retired from the 4th (Royal North Gloucester Militia) Bn, Gloucestershire Regiment, was appointed Commanding Officer (CO) of the 5th Battalion with the rank of lieutenant-colonel. (His elder brother, the 7th Earl Bathurst, was appointed as honorary colonel.)

The battalion formed part of the South Midland Brigade in the TF's South Midland Division.

== World War I ==
=== Mobilisation ===
On the outbreak of war in August 1914 the units of the South Midland Division had just set out for annual training. The men of 5th Gloucesters had only spent one night in camp at Marlow, Buckinghamshire, when on 3 August they broke camp and returned to Gloucester. Mobilisation orders for TF units were issued next day. The battalion went to its war station on the Isle of Wight until relieved, when it joined the rest of South Midland Division concentrating at Swindon in Wiltshire. In mid-August the division moved to Essex as part of Central Force, with 5th Gloucesters billeted in Chelmsford.

Shortly after the declaration of war, TF units were invited to volunteer for Overseas Service. On 15 August 1914, the War Office (WO) issued instructions to separate those men who had signed up for Home Service only, and form them into reserve units. On 31 August, the formation of a reserve or 2nd Line unit was authorised for each 1st Line unit where 60 per cent or more of the men had volunteered for Overseas Service. The titles of these 2nd Line units would be the same as the original, but distinguished by a '2/' prefix. In this way duplicate battalions, brigades and divisions were created from the recruits who were flooding in. For example, at a meeting at Gloucester Shire Hall, Maj John Collett (soon to be promoted to command 1/5th Bn) called for 25 men to enlist in the battalion, and as a result nine members of Gloucester Rugby Club (for which his brother Capt Gilbert Collett had played in 1898–1904) immediately volunteered from the audience. Later the 2nd Line were mobilised for overseas service in their own right and a 3rd Line created to supply drafts.

=== 1/5th Gloucesters ===
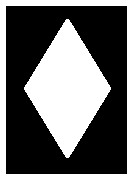
48th (South Midland) Divisional insignia. (Note: Michael Chappell comments that starting in 1918 the white diamond "was painted on helmets ... with regimental badges superimposed" upon it.)

The South Midland Division underwent progressive training in the area round Chelmsford until 13 March 1915 when it received orders to embark to join the British Expeditionary Force (BEF) in France. The South Midland Brigade crossed from Folkestone to Boulogne, 5th Gloucesters landing on 29 March. The battalion entrained for Cassel where by 3 April the whole division had concentrated. After final training in Trench warfare the 5th Gloucesters went into the line near Ploegsteert ('Plugstreet') on 7 April, attached to the experienced 11th Brigade. A Company joined the 1st Somerset Light Infantry in the trenches while 9 and 10 Platoons were with the London Rifle Brigade. The battalion returned to its brigade on 12 April, and from then on the South Midland Division took responsibility for the Plugstreet sector for the next three months, engaging in patrols and occasional trench raids. On 12 May 1915 the division was designated 48th (South Midland) Division and the brigade became 145th (South Midland) Brigade. It moved to take over the Hébuterne sector from the French Army on 20 July, and remained there until July 1916.

Map of the Glosters' actions at Ovillers.

==== Somme ====
1/5th Gloucesters served in the trenches for 16 months before it participated in its first major battle, during the Somme offensive. On the First day on the Somme (1 July) the battalion was in reserve and did not participate in the division's actions, though suffering a few casualties from shellfire. An attack planned for the next day was cancelled. On 13 July the battalion attempted a raid, but was driven back; it was relieved on 16 July. On 19 July it went into the line north-east of Ovillers–la-Boisselle and began 'softening' the German strongpoints in front of the Pozières Ridge by sending out bombing parties. Two such raids went out under heavy fire on 20 July and the battalion lost 4 officers and 110 men. On 23 July the 1/5th Bn went 'over the top' into murderous machine gun fire during the main attack (the Battle of Pozières) and was driven back with the loss of 13 officers and 125 men.

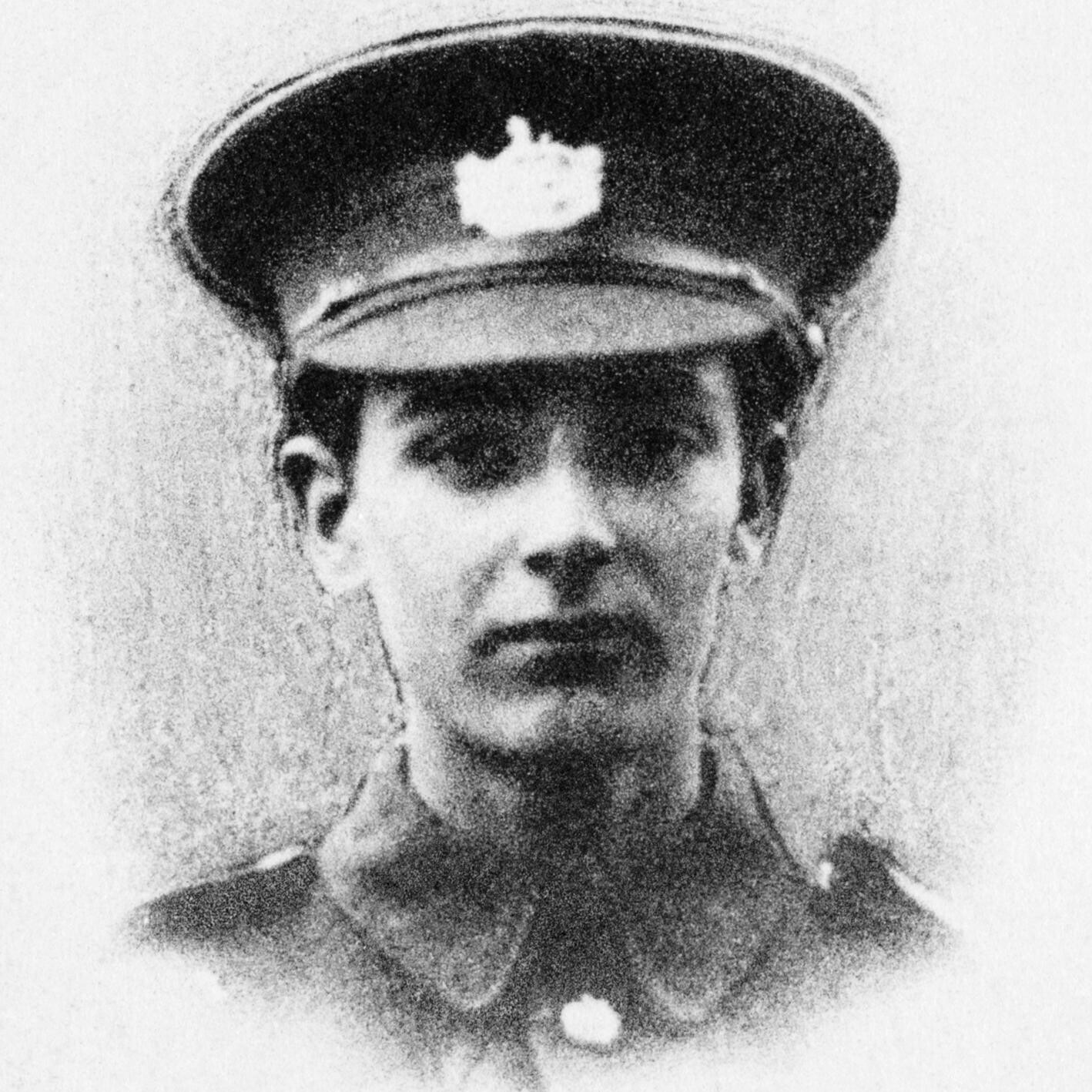
Private Frederick G. Neale, 13 Platoon, D Company, 1/5th Gloucesters. Reported missing in action during the Battle of Pozières, 16 August 1916, he is commemorated on the Thiepval Memorial to the missing of the Somme.

The division was relieved at the end of July, but was back in action on Pozières Ridge on 14–15 August, fighting unsuccessfully to capture and hold 'Skyline Trench'. On 18 August the battalion supported a more successful attack by 143rd (Warwickshire) Brigade, which took 400 prisoners, and on 25 August 1/5th Gloucesters launched two companies against German trenches, which were captured after a fierce fight.

The battalion spent the winter on the Ancre Heights, and then on 16 March 1917 the Germans began to retreat to the Hindenburg Line prepared in their rear (Operation Alberich). 1/5th Gloucesters raided La Maisonette next day and despite shellfire they quickly got into the German trenches and pushed patrols through the village, finding the Germans gone – the first unit in III Corps to discover this. Three days later it was in Peronne, fighting fires left by the retreating Germans and clearing the rubble-blocked streets. On 5 April 145th Brigade attacked Lempire and the battalion was through the village in little more than an hour and consolidating on the far side, though at the cost of 56 casualties, 15 of them fatal. The battalion supported another attack on the night of 16/17 April in 'abominable' weather, occupying the ground captured and then sending out a fighting patrol early in the morning. The advance was now called off, having reached the main Hindenburg defences.

==== Ypres ====
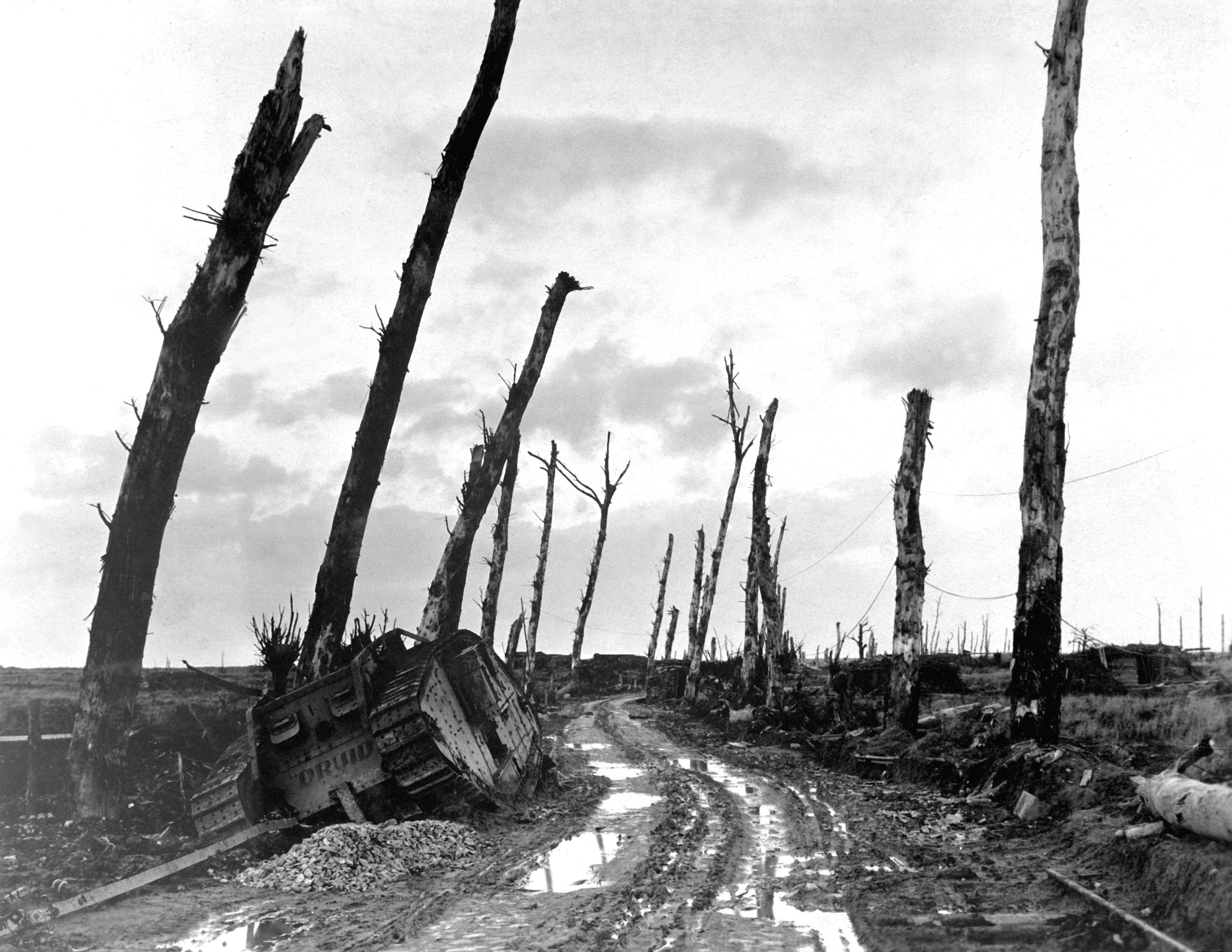
The battlefield of Poelcappelle.

After a period of training 48th (SM) Division moved to the Ypres Salient in July to take part in the Third Ypres Offensive. During the Battle of Langemarck (16–18 August), 1/5th Battalion took part in 145th Brigade's difficult attack on a German strongpoint built into the most northerly house in the village of St Julien. The advance then met a heavy crossfire as the leading wave topped the rise of ground about 200 yards (180 m) east of the Steenbeck. Further attempts to advance only resulted in additional casualties. The battalion dug in and held on against determined counter-attacks. By the end of the action the 1/5th had lost 8 officers and 209 other ranks killed and wounded; only four frontline company officers survived Langemarck.

As the offensive continued, 1/5th Gloucesters took a small part in the Battle of Polygon Wood (26 September), supplying two companies to support an attack by 175th (2/3rd London) Brigade, then next day it relieved a London battalion in the line and was heavily shelled, with 16 men killed. On 28 September the CO, Lt-Col Adam, was gassed and evacuated. After three days' rest the battalion re-entered the line for an attack on 4 October (the Battle of Broodseinde). It was in reserve, and began its attack late in the afternoon, in heavy rain. Three companies attacked, each with a farm as its objective. Held up by the mud the attackers fell behind the Creeping barrage and were caught by machine guns. After advancing about 300 yards (270 m) all the men could do was dig in; casualties were 131, of whom 25 died. During the Battle of Poelcappelle on 9 October, 1/5th Gloucesters supplied carrying parties and stretcher-bearers to assist 144th (Gloucester & Worcester) Brigade.

==== Italy ====
On 11 October the 48th (SM) Division was relieved from the Ypres sector and went to hold the line near Vimy. On 10 November 1917 it received orders to transfer to the Italian Front, and the move began on 21 November. By 30 November the units had finished detraining around Legnago on the Adige and 1/5th Gloucesters was billeted at San Gregorio nelle Alpi, moving to Stroppari by the end of the year. On 1 March 1918 the division relieved 7th Division in the front line of the Montello sector on the Piave Front, and held the line until 16 March, with 1/5th Gloucesters engaging in active patrolling. On 1 April it moved westward into reserve for the middle sector of the Asiago Plateau Front.

On 15 June the Austro-Hungarian Army made what proved to be its last attack, known to the British participants as the Battle of Asiago. The 48th (SM) Division had been particularly hard-hit by the Spanish flu epidemic, and the 1/5th Bn was only about 490 strong; the brigadier had hesitated whether it should even take its place in the line. The attacking Austrians got through the weakly-held outposts in the woods and then outflanked the main defences to reach 1/5th Bn's HQ. The battalion HQ staff, cooks, signallers, drivers and batmen made a stand, holding on until one of the companies came round the enemy flank, and were then rescued by the arrival of another brigade. The battalion's casualties amounted to 11 officers and 138 other ranks killed and missing, with nine officers and 64 other ranks wounded; its desperate stand was rewarded with a DSO, two MCs, one DCM and six MMs.

==== Hundred Days ====
25th Divisional insignia

The British force in Italy was now called on to provide battalions to rebuild divisions shattered in the German spring offensive on the Western Front. Thee battalions of 48th (SM) Division, including 1/5th Glosters, returned to the BEF on 11 September 1918 to reconstitute 75th Brigade in 25th Division, though 1/5th Gloucesters only had enough men for three instead of four platoons per company. The division joined the Fourth Army Reserve at the end of the month during the Allied Hundred Days Offensive.

25th Division was gradually moved forward, and began to take over frontline positions on 3/4 October. It was facing the Beaurevoir Line, with the village of Beaurevoir standing on a hill giving complete command over exposed ground in front. The German positions were concealed among farm buildings, houses and the railway embankment and the first attacks failed. 75th Brigade was brought up to renew the attack on 5 October. Zero hour was 18.40, but even before the barrage had lifted, 1/5th Gloucesters left its lines at 18.25, climbed the railway embankment west of Beaurevoir, and cleared away the machine gunners on the other side while they were still taking cover from the barrage. The two leading companies (A on the left, B on the right) then passed through to the village, meeting little opposition except from isolated machine guns and snipers, which were quickly dealt with by the 'moppers-up' of C Company. By nightfall the battalion occupied a line on the far side of the village. Its casualties were 54, of whom 11 died.

The division then participated in the pursuit across open country against weak opposition (the Second Battle of Cambrai), until the line of the River Selle was reached on 10 October. 25th Division was in reserve during the first day of the Battle of the Selle (17 October), but 75th Brigade was tasked with following up the next day's attack. 1/5th Gloucesters was one of the leading battalions, suffering from the German counter-bombardment during the approach march, then passing through the attacking group of 50th (Northumbrian) Division, which had been held up short of the first objective. The battalion was opposed by machine guns from both flanks and by direct fire from field guns at short range, but the gun crews were driven away with Lewis gun fire and the guns captured. The brigade then pushed on to the crest of the ridge overlooking Bazuel. As the Germans could be heard withdrawing during the night 75th Brigade made an early start next morning and completed the capture of the original second objective by 07.30.

75th Brigade attacked again on 23 October, although its strength was by now barely that of a battalion. It made the second phase attack about an hour after Zero. 1/5th Gloucesters captured Bazuel and advanced on Pommereuil, on the fringes of the Bois l'Évêque, where it was held up by a line of machine guns in a sunken lane. Private Francis Miles went forward alone under heavy fire, located one of the machine guns, shot the gunner and put it out of action. Seeing another machine gun nearby he advanced again, shot the gunner and rushed the gun position, capturing the team of eight men. He then stood up and beckoned forward the rest of his company, guiding them by signals to work around the rear of the position. The company captured 16 machine guns, one officer and 50 other ranks. Private Miles was awarded the Victoria Cross, his citation stating that 'it was due to the courage, initiative and entire disregard of personal safety shown by this gallant soldier that the company was enabled to advance at a time when any delay would have jeopardised seriously the operation'.

After forcing the Selle, Fourth Army continued its advance to the Sambre–Oise Canal, where it paused for 10 days to prepare an assault crossing at Landrecies (the Battle of the Sambre, 4 November). 75th Brigade led 25th Division's crossing – which the other brigades did not believe could be achieved – and there was a competition between the battalions as to which could get over first. 1/5th Gloucesters was in the lead, but it was a company of 1/8th Worcestershire Regiment that rushed an undamaged bridge, closely followed by the Glosters, while the rest of the brigade was ferried across the canal on petrol-tin rafts. By 12.45 the Germans were in full retreat, leaving behind many prisoners and guns. The battalion's losses were 65, of which 14 were fatal. The pursuit continued until 75th Brigade's advance was checked at some high ground on 7 November, but advances elsewhere along the line soon outflanked the Germans and 25th Division established a line just beyond Saint-Hilaire-sur-Helpe that evening. The division was then relieved and withdrawn behind the Sambre. It was still resting when the Armistice with Germany came into force on 11 November.

25th Division's units were engaged in salvage work in the months after the Armistice. Demobilisation started in January and gradually the units dwindled away. By 28 March 1919 the division was reduced to cadre strength, and 1/5th Gloucesters was disembodied on 5 July 1919. During the war 30 officers and 557 other ranks of the battalion had died. (Note: Modern research gives the fatal casualties of the 5th Gloucesters between 1914 and 1921 as follows: 1/5th, 543; 2/5th, 491; 3/5th, 2; battalion not specified: 90.)

=== 2/5th Gloucesters ===
61st (2nd South Midland) Divisional insignia.

Lt-Col the Hon Benjamin Bathurst, MP for Cirencester, and former CO of the 5th Battalion, was asked to raise the 2nd Line battalion, and was assisted by a number of officers from the 1st line, including Major the Rt Hon Charles Allen, MP for Stroud.

The 2/5th Gloucesters was formed on 7 September 1914 at Gloucester and took its place in 2/1st South Midland Brigade in 2nd South Midland Division. Its recruits included men from all walks of life. At first they lived at home, and little or nothing was available in terms of uniforms, arms or equipment (they wore a square of white silk with the battalion number on the lapel of their civilian jackets). Battalion drills were carried out at The Oxleaze, and the battalion sent its first draft to the 1/5th Bn in early January. It was not until the division concentrated at Northampton on 1 February 1915 that the men were issued with .256-in Japanese Ariska rifles with which to train. Here they formed part of First Army of Central Force, but when the 1st South Midland Division went to France, the 2nd took its place at Chelmsford and became part of Third Army of Central Force, with a definite role in Home Defence. Much time was spent digging trenches at Epping, Essex, as part of the outer London defences. The battalions formed their machine gun sections while at Chelmsford, but the strength of the battalions fluctuated widely as they were drawn upon for drafts for their 1st Line battalions. In August 1915 the division was numbered as the 61st (2nd South Midland) Division and the brigade became the 184th (2nd South Midland) Brigade.

In February and March 1916 the units of 61st (2nd SM) Division moved to Salisbury Plain to begin final training for overseas service. Here they were issued with .303 SMLE rifles in place of the Japanese weapons, and four Lewis guns per battalion in place of dummy guns and antique Maxim guns. Final leave was granted in April and May and entrainment for the embarkation ports began on 21 May. 2/5th Gloucesters embarked on HM Transport 861 at Southampton and landed at Le Havre on 25 May. By 28 May the division was concentrated at Le Sart.

==== Fromelles and the Somme ====
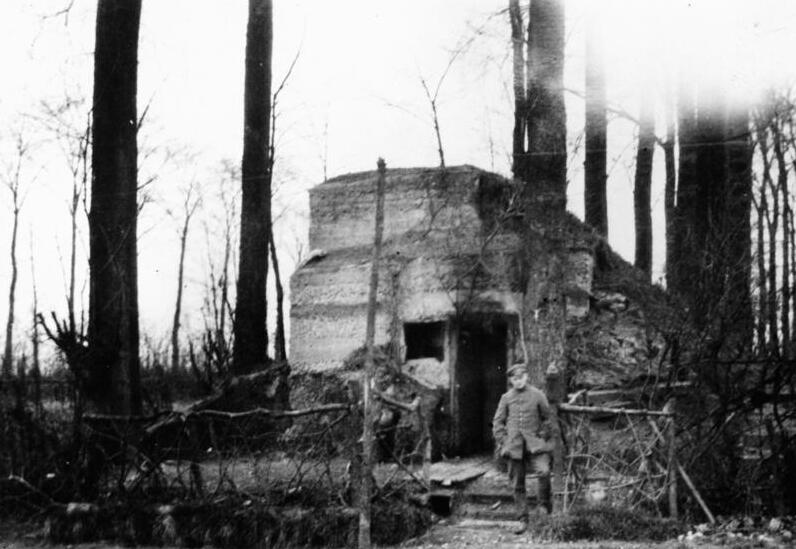
A German concrete strongpoint in the Fromelles salient, July 1916.

Unlike the 48th (SM) Division, which had over a year of trench service before undertaking its first attack, the 61st had only a matter of weeks. After a short tour of duty for each battalion in the front line near Laventie, during which 2/5th Gloucesters carried out an unsuccessful raid, the division was thrown into the Attack at Fromelles on 19 July 1916. In a diversionary action to relieve pressure on the Somme front, the attacking troops were committed to a short advance over flat, waterlogged country against strong defences including concrete machine gun emplacements. The attack was a disaster, the assaulting battalions taking very heavy casualties, but 2/5th Bn in brigade reserve escaped the worst. Afterwards the battalion provided stretcher-bearers and burial parties. 61st (2nd SM) Division was only used for trench-holding for the rest of the year, but this did not preclude active raiding. For example, on the night of 27/28 July the Germans attacked Duck's Bill Crater, situated in No man's land and usually guarded by a small sentry group. As soon as the German barrage came down, A Company promptly moved down the sap into the crater, thereby avoiding the shelling and being in position to repel the attack; a bombing party took the attackers in the flank, and a second attack was also beaten off. The company received two MCs, two DCMs and six MMs. In August C Company carried out a successful raid, for which it had trained for two weeks.

At the beginning of November the division moved to the Somme sector, going into the line in front of Grandcourt. Much of January 1917 was spent out of the line, training at Gapennes, and then in February 48th (SM) Division relieved a French formation in the Ablaineville sector. The battalion was out of the line at Guillaucourt on 17 March when news arrived of the German retreat to the Hindenburg Line, and instead of resting it was sent forward to Vermandovillers, and then spent 10 days repairing damaged roads. As the slow pursuit continued, A Company attacked Bihecourt on 2 April with the support of a field artillery battery, catching the defenders by surprise and quickly overrunning the village. On 7 April B and C Companies made a further attack on the enemy's rearguards, a costly operation resulting in 15 other ranks killed and seven officers and 27 other ranks wounded. The division took up positions facing the Hindenburg Line in front of St Quentin. By now the battalion was very tired, and had been reduced to three companies of three platoons each. In May, 2/5th Gloucesters moved to the Arras area for rest and training. Reinforcements permitted D Company to be reformed in July.

==== Ypres and Cambrai ====
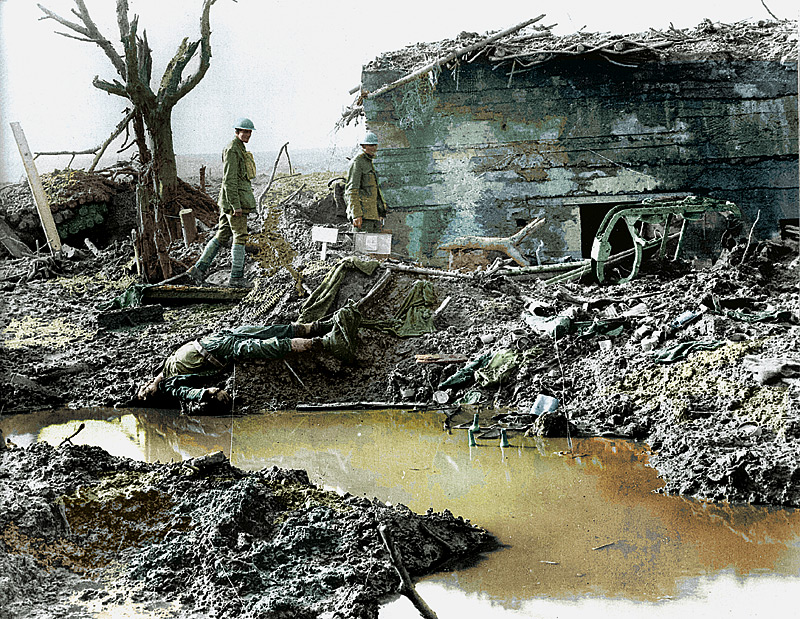
Captured German pillbox or 'Mebu' at Ypres

61st (2nd SM) Division moved to Ypres in July, and was put in as a fresh formation at the end of the Battle of Langemarck on 22 August. With 2/5th Gloucesters in close support behind the leading battalions, 184th Brigade made slow progress against the concrete pillboxes and machine-gun nests hidden in the farm buildings on their front. 2/4th Oxfordshire and Buckinghamshire Light Infantry (OBLI) failed to take the Pond Farm strongpoint, but two platoons of D Company, 2/5th Gloucesters, and then two platoons of C Company finally succeeded in killing or capturing the whole garrison, at heavy cost to themselves. A German counter-attack temporarily recaptured Pond Farm that night, but it was easily secured next morning. The battalion was relieved for refitting, and did not participate in the division's final attacks. (Note: 'Langemarck 1917' was the first battle honour gained by 2/5th Battalion.)

While the Ypres fighting continued, 2/5th Gloucesters moved by train to the Arras sector, where C Company carried out a trench raid on 23 October. In late November 61st (2nd SM) Division moved south to relieve exhausted British formations after the Battle of Cambrai. By the time it arrived the Germans had launched a heavy counter-offensive. 2/5th Gloucesters spent a day in support behind 3rd Guards Brigade, which had been fighting for eight days, then moved up the following night (2/3 December) to a position behind Welsh Ridge. D Company had just halted in a sunken lane when a German night-bomber hit a nearby ammunition dump: the company lost 16 killed and 53 wounded in the resulting explosion. At dawn a German attack drove 183rd (2nd Gloucester and Worcester) Brigade back from La Vacquerie to the slopes of Welsh Ridge, where 2/5th Gloucesters stabilised the situation. The next few weeks were spent in consolidation.

In January 1918 61st (SM) Division took over a sector from the French in front of St Quentin and began constructing the new system of defences mandated by General Headquarters. These were designed to economise on manpower because the BEF was suffering severe shortages. During February the 2/4th and 2/6th Gloucesters of 183rd Brigade were disbanded, many of their men being drafted to bring 2/5th Bn up to full strength.

==== Spring Offensive ====
When the German spring offensive was launched on 21 March 1918, 61st (2nd SM) Division was manning its revised frontline positions. 2/4th OBLI held 184th Brigade's Forward Zone position ('Enghein Redoubt') overlooking Fayet, behind which 2/5th Gloucesters held Holnon Wood 4,000 yards (3,700 m) back in the Battle Zone. After a heavy bombardment the thick morning mist allowed the attackers to close in and penetrate between the Forward Zone redoubts. The remains of 2/4th OBLI held out in Enghein Redoubt until about 16.00; very few managed to cut their way out. A few survivors and stragglers of the battalion attached themselves to 2/5th Gloucesters, which had been fighting since about 13.00. By then the mist had cleared and they had the advantage of a wide field of fire, allowing them to inflict severe losses on the advancing Germans – a vindication of the new defensive tactics. The Germans were unable to get closer than a few hundred yards and 2/5th Gloucesters held their positions all day.

A return of the mist next morning allowed German parties to infiltrate behind the battalion's support positions where they began to cause casualties among Battalion HQ and D Company. A bombardment began at 09.00 and several attacks on C Company's position were thrown back. After midday the battalion's position became desperate: the Battle Zone to its left had been lost and it would soon be surrounded. The battalion did not know that the rest of the division had been ordered to retire to the River Somme, and it was not until 15.30 that the order to retire got through. D Company in the support trench covered the retreat of the other companies, and then had to fight a stiff rearguard action while under enfilading machine gun fire. A party of Battalion HQ stayed in position to cover the withdrawal of the rest of HQ: almost all were killed or captured. The battalion got back to the Rear Zone trenches at Beauvois about 17.00, where D Company rejoined later. The Rear Zone trenches were shallow, with little barbed wire, but there was plenty of ammunition. About 18.00 The Germans attacked out of Holnon Wood over the flat ground towards Beauvois accompanied by a sharp barrage, but were held up in the scanty wire. At midnight, warned by the neighbouring 2/4th Royal Berkshire Regiment that it was withdrawing, 2/5th Gloucesters slipped away before daylight on 23 March. The battalion's casualties over the two days are unrecorded but were heavy. Having remained in position all day on 22 March the battalion had acted as an inadvertent rearguard allowing the rest of the division to disengage. The tenacity and determination of D Company was singled out for praise by Sir Arthur Conan Doyle in his history of the war.

On 23 March the remnants of 184th Brigade were pulled back into reserve. From then on, retreat was continuous: on 24 March 2/5th Gloucesters marched to Voyennes and then to Languevoisin, where they were fed. The battalion moved on to Billancourt but then back to Languevoisin where it spent the night. Next day it was ordered to cover the crossings of the Canal du Nord at Buverchy. C Company crossed the canal and was advancing in open order to take up a flank position when it was caught in enfilade by a machine gun and Germans appeared in large numbers. C Company was withdrawn and the battalion lined the canal bank and trenches in rear of the village. On 25 March the Germans put down an hour-long bombardment of the canal bank and village, and attempted to cross, but were driven back by rifle and machine-gun fire. An attempt to mass troops in dead ground for a second attack was broken up by Lewis gun fire from a tall building in Buverchy. About 16.00 French troops on the right gave way and the enemy began crossing the canal and working round 2/5th Gloucesters' flank. The battalion put out a flank guard and retired to Crécy. At midnight it was ordered back to Roye and then down the Roye–Amiens road to Mézières, which it reached at 11.00 on 26 March and then rested. Late in the day it took up positions near Le Quesnel where it spent a quiet night.

The battalion was taken by motor bus from Le Quesnel to take part in 61st (2nd SM) Division's projected counter-attack at Lamotte-Warfusée on 28 March. This was a disaster: beginning about 12.00, with A Company on the right, D Company on the left and C Company in support (B Company not yet having arrived) and with no covering artillery barrage, the battalion advanced across open rising ground until massed enemy machine guns opened fire. Lying flat under murderous fire the men did what they could to dig themselves in. The division's doomed attack failed, and the battalion was withdrawn to a railway cutting at Marcelcave, having suffered 200 casualties. It was driven out of Marcelcave later in the day and dug in 1,000 yards (910 m) back at the airfield next to the Marcelcave–Villers-Bretonneux railway. There were barely 150 men in the line, with nothing behind them, but the Germans had shot their bolt, and did not attack. The battalion remained in position under shellfire until relief arrived on 31 March. The battalion had lost 20 officers and 550 men in 10 days' fighting.

On 4 April 2/5th Gloucesters moved to Warlus, near Arras, where the battalion rested and absorbed reinforcements, but this period was broken by the second phase of the German offensive (the Battle of the Lys). On 12 April the battalion was brought up by train and went into the line, near St Venant. holding off a German attack next day (part of the Battle of Hazebrouck). German troops continuously tried to infiltrate the position. On the night of 17/18 April (during the Battle of Béthune) they took Bacquerolles Farm, but were thrown out by a platoon of A Company led by Sergeant White, who was awarded the DCM. On 23 April the battalion carried out a successful local attack to straighten the line near Bacquerolles Farm, though it lost 100 casualties during the German counter-bombardment. The CO, Lt-Col Lawson, won a Bar to his DSO for this attack. The unit held the line until 24 June when it was relieved for an intensive rest; Lt-Col Lawson was killed on the last morning before relief, while carrying out a personal reconnaissance.

==== Hundred Days ====
The battalion was out of the line for over a month, during which it suffered badly during the Spanish flu outbreak. While the Allies launched their final Hundred Days Offensive on 8 August 1918 with the Battle of Amiens, 2/5th Gloucesters were in the line further north. On the night of 10/11 August the battalion carried out a minor attack, attempting to cross the Plate Becque steam using portable bridges. The operation was a complete failure, resulting in numerous casualties, but one DCM and two MMs were awarded to a Section that established itself across the stream and maintained its position all day before skilfully withdrawing. In late August the battalion did another tour of duty at the Plate Becque, but on 31 August it began to advance, following the now-retreating Germans.

2/5th Gloucesters were out of the line from 2 to 27 September, then began training for an operation near Estaires. During the night and morning of 29/30 September it carried out a battalion attack to secure Junction Post, the capture of which allowed the brigade to resume the advance. The battalion was then moved by rail to the Cambrai sector. On 24 October, during the Battle of the Selle, 61st (2nd SM) Division attacked behind a barrage with 184th Brigade in support. The brigade was then ordered to follow through at 16.00 and make a converging attack on Vendegies-sur-Écaillon. There was little time to prepare, but two companies of 2/5th Gloucesters formed the north-east arm of the attack with their own barrage. The brigade's attack was held up for 75 minutes by enemy shelling, but opposition was slight, and the north-west attack found the village unoccupied, with the two Gloucester companies (which had lost touch in the growing darkness) entering the north-east corner. Next day the brigade advanced again, with 2/5th Gloucesters in support.

After the pause before the Selle (see above), 61st (2nd SM) Division attacked again on 1 November (the Battle of Valenciennes), but was held up by a German counter-attack. 184th renewed the attack at 19.30 after several postponements, with 2/5th Gloucesters advancing under a barrage, but the battalion was checked by machine gun fire. Next morning the 2/5th Gloucesters and 2/4th OBLI led the advance of 61st (2nd SM) Division, pushing 1,000 yards (910 m) beyond the objective. The two battalions captured two tanks and 620 prisoners. The division was relieved that night, and was near Valenciennes when the Armistice came into force.

2/5th Gloucesters spent the following weeks on railway repair and battlefield clearance. Demobilisation began in January 1919, but the battalion continued to do duty at the base ports. By the end of June many of the division's units had been reduced to equipment guards, while men with less service were drafted to Egypt and the Black Sea. The last battalions were reduced to cadres and went home before the end of July. The cadre of 2/5th Gloucesters was disbanded on 11 October 1919 at Catterick Garrison. During the war over 548 men of the battalion had died.

=== 3/5th Gloucesters ===
The 3rd Line battalions of the Gloucesters formed at their depots during 1915 (the 3/5th on 1 May) and moved to Weston-super-Mare. On 8 April 1916 they were redesignated Reserve Battalions, and on 1 September at Ludgershall the 4th (City of Bristol) Reserve Bn absorbed the former 3/5th Bn.

The remaining Home Service men had been separated from the 3rd Line battalions in May 1915 and formed into Provisional Battalions for home defence. The men of 5th Gloucesters joined with those from the rest of the South Midland Brigade (4th OBLI, Buckinghamshire Battalion, and 4th Royal Berkshires) to form 83rd Provisional Battalion in 8th Provisional Brigade. This later became the 10th Battalion, OBLI.

== Interwar ==
The TF was reconstituted on 7 February 1920 (reorganising as the Territorial Army (TA) in 1921) and 5th Gloucesters reformed at the Brunswick Road drill hall. It formed part of 145th (South Midland) Brigade once more. A number of school cadet corps were affiliated to the battalion between the wars: Marling School, Stroud; The Rich School; Crypt Grammar School; Dursley Church School

By 1939 the battalion was at Drill Hall, Painswick Road, Gloucester, and had moved to 144th (Gloucester & Worcester) Brigade, replacing the 4th and 6th Gloucesters, which had converted to a searchlight battalion and a tank battalion respectively. After the Munich Crisis the TA was rapidly doubled in size. The 5th Gloucesters created a duplicate unit by separating B and D Companies to form a new 7th Battalion, with its first officer commissioned on 1 June 1939. Both battalions were then recruited up to strength. (Note: A previous 7th (Service) Battalion, Gloucestershire Regiment had been formed in 1914 as part of Kitchener's Army. It served through World War I until it was disbanded in 1919.)

== World War II ==
=== 5th Gloucesters ===
5th Gloucesters were mobilised on 3 September 1939 under the command of Lt-Col G.A.H. Buxton. 48th (South Midland) Division was the first Territorial division to go to France to reinforce the British Expeditionary Force (BEF), with 5th Gloucesters landing in France on 15 January 1940. It took its place in the 'Ligne de Contact' in March and gained experience of frontline patrolling. On the night of 3 March a patrol was out in No man's land when a serious attack was made on the battalion's front. A Bren gunner in B Company was hit and dropped his gun over the parapet just as the Germans reached the barbed wire. In full view of the enemy Sgt Adlam went out to retrieve it, bringing it back into action and stopping the attack. Meanwhile, the patrol came in while the fighting continued, identifying themselves by singing the Regimental (Where be that blackbird be?) and Battalion (Begger I 'ell) songs. Subsequently, Adlam received the first Military Medal awarded to a Territorial in the war.

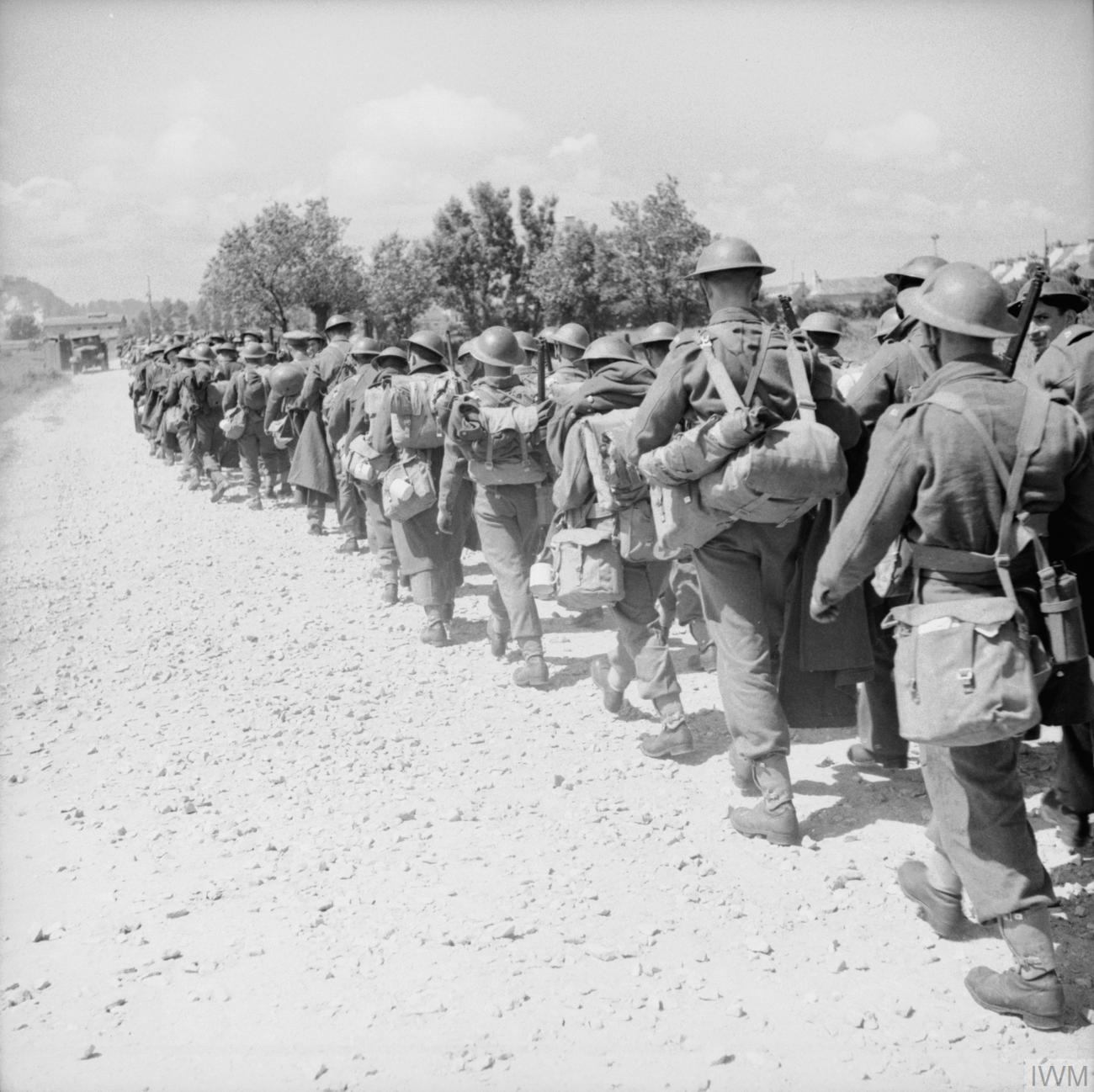
A column of British infantry retreating to Dunkirk, 1940.

The Battle of France began on 10 May with the German invasion of the Low Countries. The BEF followed the pre-arranged Plan D and advanced into Belgium to take up defences along the Dyle. 48th (SM) Division was in support of the divisions along the Dyle line, with 5th Gloucesters sent to Glabais (near Genappe) to make contact with the French Army on the right flank. Arriving at 04.00 on 17 May they found no sign of the French and were recalled two hours later. By now, the German Army had broken through the Ardennes to the east, forcing the BEF to withdraw again across a series of river lines. From Glabais 5th Gloucesters marched back 30 miles in the day, twice taking up defensive positions and once opening fire on enemy tanks. At 22.00 the tired battalion was ordered to send two companies forward again to cover the withdrawal of other units. By the end of 19 May the whole force was back across the Escaut, with 48th (SM) Division, already tired after many miles marching, having raced to get to the river ahead of the German vanguard. By the time it reached Frasnes where it picked up transport for Tournai, 5th Gloucesters had marched 95 miles (153 km) in 83 hours.

On 21 May 5th Gloucesters was heavily engaged in driving back attempts to cross the river, but the previous day the German breakthrough had reached the sea and the BEF was cut off. 48th (SM) Division was among the forces pulled out of the east-facing Escaut line to form a west-facing line along a series of canals in the Bergues–Cassel–Hazebrouck area covering the approaches to Dunkirk, where the division arrived on 25 May.

==== Defence of Ledringhem ====
Dunkirk had been identified as the port for partial evacuation of the BEF, but by the evening of 26 May full evacuation (Operation Dynamo) was ordered. On 26 May 5th Gloucesters dug in at Ledringhem and Arnèke, covering the Bergues–Wormhoudt–Cassel–Hazebrouck road. Next day the German attack developed against 48th (SM) Division's widely spaced units. 5th Gloucesters held its positions for the whole day, though a German column penetrated for some distance between it and the 2nd Gloucesters in Cassel, and another was working round Wormhoudt. Next day the Germans continued to attack all the division's increasingly isolated strongpoints and the road became unusable. 144th Brigade was ordered to withdraw after nightfall, but 5th Gloucesters were surrounded in Ledringhem and did not receive the order for some time. They 'thinned out' their all-round defences, but the enemy had closed in such that bayonet charges were needed to dislodge German posts. The battalion was unable to disengage until midnight when the remaining 13 officers and 130 men made the way across country with their wounded CO and some prisoners to rejoin the brigade on the Yser early in the morning of 29 May. The rest of the wounded were left under the care of two medical orderlies to be taken prisoner. Sir Arthur Bryant described the Gloucesters' action at Ledringhem as 'worthy of a place among the great epics of British military valour in adversity'. The troops on the Yser continued to act as western flank guard for the shrinking Dunkirk pocket, fighting off determined attacks by German motorised formations. 5th Gloucesters was ordered into Dunkirk at midnight on 30 May, reaching Bray-Dunes the following morning after a hard march. After joining up with members of the battalion who had been separated, they waited on the beach until they were taken off by small boats and evacuated back to various ports in England on 31 May.

The units evacuated from Dunkirk were slowly re-equipped from the scanty resources available and took their places in the anti-invasion defences. 5th Gloucesters reformed about 400 strong in Herefordshire and went down to Cornwall for training. It remained in 144th Bde until 21 May 1941. 5th Gloucesters became the reconnaissance battalion of 48th (SM) Division on 12 July 1941 and was redesignated 48th Battalion, Reconnaissance Corps, on 14 October.

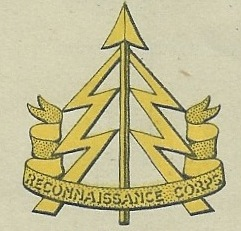
Cap badge of the Reconnaissance Corps, 1941.

=== 43rd (Wessex) Reconnaissance Regiment ===
On 20 November 1941 the battalion was transferred to 43rd (Wessex) Division, and on 7 January 1942 it was renamed as 43rd Battalion, Reconnaissance Corps, later becoming 43rd (Wessex) Reconnaissance Regiment (The Gloucestershire Regiment) in the Royal Armoured Corps. It served with 43rd (Wessex) Division until the end of the war, including the Normandy Campaign, Operation Market Garden, the fighting in the Reichswald, and the advance across Germany after the Rhine Crossing.

After the war 43rd Recce Regiment transferred back to the Glosters as the 5th Battalion once more and was placed in suspended animation in July 1946.

=== 7th Gloucesters ===
The 7th Gloucesters formed part of 183rd Infantry Brigade in 61st Infantry Division (the second line duplicate of 48th (SM) Division once more). When the BEF was evacuated from Dunkirk, 61st Division was sent to defend Northern Ireland. It returned to the mainland in February 1943, serving in East Anglia and South East England. 61st Division trained hard for Operation Overlord, but in the end it was not actually used in North West Europe and in April 1944 it became a training organisation.

On 3 August 1944 the battalion transferred to 213th Infantry Brigade in 76th Infantry Division. These were reformed as 140th Infantry Brigade and 47th Infantry (Reserve) Division respectively on 1 September. The battalion remained with this brigade until after the end of the war. It was placed in suspended animation on 1 February 1946 at Crowborough.

== Postwar ==
When the TA was reconstituted on 1 January 1947 the 5th and 7th battalions reformed as an amalgamated 5th Bn, serving in the infantry role once more. It took its place in 129 Brigade of 43 (Wessex) Division

The TA was reduced into the Territorial and Army Volunteer Reserve (TAVR) in 1967, when the battalion was split to become A Company (Gloucestershire) in the Wessex Volunteers, and C Squadron, Royal Gloucestershire Hussars. When the Wessex Volunteers were expanded in 1971 (becoming the Wessex Regiment the following year), A Company formed part of 1st Battalion (Rifle Volunteers) and formed new detachments at Cheltenham, Bristol and Trowbridge (and at Cinderford in 1989), though it lost its 'Gloucester' subtitle.

By 1991, A Company had two platoons at Bristol, and in April 1995 they were separated to form B Company. Later that year the battalion became 2nd (Volunteer) Bn, Royal Gloucestershire, Berkshire and Wiltshire Regiment, with A (Gloucester) and B (City of Bristol) companies. However, on 1 July 1999 the battalion was reduced to a single company in the Rifle Volunteers, based at Gloucester with platoons at Bristol and Cinderford. It maintained the tradition of wearing the Glosters 'Back Badge'.

In 2007 the Rifle Volunteers became 6th Battalion, The Rifles, (6 RIFLES) with A Company based at Gloucester.

== Personalities ==
=== Honorary Colonels ===
The following served as Honorary Colonel of the battalion:

- Henry Reynolds-Moreton, 3rd Earl of Ducie, appointed 16 June 1868 and held the position until the creation of the TF
- Col Seymour Bathurst, 7th Earl Bathurst, CMG, former CO of the 4th (Militia) Bn, Gloucestershire Regiment, appointed 22 September 1908, to 1933
- Maj Sir Lionel Darell, 6th Baronet, DSO, appointed 27 June 1936
- Col Robert Michael Grazebrook, OBE, MC
- Col James Carne, VC, DSO, appointed 28 August 1956

=== Commanding officers ===
Commanding officers included:

- Col William Purnell, CB, (90th Light Infantry, retired) commissioned 3 March 1860
- Lt-Col Sir William Guise, 4th Baronet, commissioned 15 July 1865
- Brevet Col James Collier, (Bombay Staff Corps, retired), commissioned 22 February 1870
- Lt-Col Sir Thomas Hyde Crawley–Boevey, 5th Baronet, (69th Foot, retired) commissioned 8 May 1886
- Lt-Col M. Holland, VD, commissioned 25 August 1897
- Lt-Col Lindsey D. Winterbotham, commissioned 14 September 1905
- Lt-Col Hon Benjamin Bathurst, MP, (son of 6th Earl and younger brother of 7th Earl Bathurst; 4th (Militia) Bn, Gloucestershire Regiment, retired) commissioned 18 April 1908
- Lt-Col Samuel Marling, commissioned 10 May 1913

1/5th Battalion

- Lt-Col John Collett from 10 September 1914
- Maj John Scott-Tucker acting from 21 February to 1 April 1916
- Maj Gilbert Collett acting from 1 April to 11 June 1916
- Lt-Col John Collett returned 14 June, invalided 24 August 1916
- Maj Henry Court acting from 1 November to 16 December 1916
- Maj Leslie Parkinson acting from 16 December 1916 to 2 January 1917
- Lt-Col Alexander Skinner from 2 January to 6 June 1917
- Lt-Col William Adam from 23 June 1917, gassed 28 September 1917
- Maj Lloyd-Baker acting from 28 September
- Lt-Col William Adam returned by end November 1917; wounded 2 June 1918
- Lt-Col Noel Waller from 2 to 23 June 1918
- Maj Philip Hall acting from 23 June to 8 July 1918
- Lt-Col Dudley Lewis from 9 July 1918 to demobilisation

2/5th Battalion

- Lt-Col Hon Benjamin Bathurst, from formation to 8 March 1916
- Lt-Col Percy Balfour from 9 March 1916, wounded 28 December 1916
- Maj George Vivian acting from 28 December, invalided 29 December 1916
- Capt Charles Beloe acting from 29 December 1916 to 12 January 1917
- Lt-Col Percy Balfour returned 12 January to 8 June 1917
- Lt-Col Gilbert Collett (from 1/5th Bn) from 8 June to 15 October 1917
- Maj Charles Beloe acting from 15 October 1917 to 1 February 1918
- Lt-Col Gilbert Collett returned 1 February 1918 to 17 March 1918
- Lt-Col Arthur Lawson from 17 March, killed in action 24 June 1918
- Lt-Col Geoffrey Christie-Miller from 24 June to 15 September 1918
- Lt-Col Richard Huntington from 15 September 1918 to demobilisation

3/5th Battalion

- Maj Evan Jeune from 3 April 1915 to 7 March 1916
- Lt-Col John Tarrant from 7 March to 31 August 1916

5th Bn

- Lt-Col N.H. Waller, MC, TD, commissioned 1 April 1922
- Lt-Col G.A.H. Buxton, commissioned 17 January 1938

=== Other prominent members ===
- Maj the Rt Hon Charles Allen, MP and Welsh Rugby international, served in the 2/5th Bn
- Lt-Col Sir James Campbell, 5th Baronet, of Aberuchil
- Maj Charles Noel, 2nd Earl of Gainsborough
- Lt Arthur Noel, 4th Earl of Gainsborough (as Viscount Campden)
- Ivor Gurney, poet and composer, served in the 2/5th Bn and was wounded and gassed.
- Lt Will Harvey, DCM, poet, served in the 1/5th Bn and was captured at Pozières on 17 August 1916
- Francis Miles, won a VC with the 1/5th Bn on 23 October 1918
- Rev Sir George Prevost, 2nd Baronet, Honorary Chaplain of the 11th (Dursley) RVC

== Uniforms and insignia ==
The 2nd Volunteer Battalion wore a green uniform with scarlet facings, similar to that of the Kings Royal Rifle Corps and kept this when it became the 5th Battalion in 1908, even though the other volunteer battalions adopted the scarlet tunics and white facings then worn by the Glosters. The battalion retained the green uniform in full dress until 1925, when it finally adopted the scarlet tunic. The Glosters' facings changed to Primrose yellow in 1929. After 1918 the contribution of the TF battalions during World War I was recognised when they were permitted to adopt the famous 'Back Badge' of the Glosters.

After World War II, the battalion's colours bore as an honorary distinction the badge of the Reconnaissance Corps with the dates 1944–45 and 'North West Europe' on a scroll.

== Battle Honours ==
The 5th Gloucesters were awarded the following Battle Honours:

- South Africa 1900–1902

1/5th Battalion

- France and Flanders 1915–16
- Ypres 1917
- Langemarck 1917
- Somme 1916
- Albert 1916
- Pozières
- Polygon Wood
- Broodseinde
- Poelcapelle
- Cambrai 1918
- Hindenburg Line
- Beaurevoir
- Selle
- Sambre
- Italy 1917–18
- Piave

2/5th Battalion

- France and Flanders 1916–18
- Ypres 1917
- Langemarck 1917
- Somme 1918
- Cambrai 1917
- St Quentin
- Rosières
- Avre
- Lys
- Hazebrouck
- Béthune
- Selle
- Valenciennes

The battalion's battle honours during World War II are included in those of the Gloucestershire Regiment, which was awarded the following honours for the actions of 2nd and 5th Gloucesters during the Battle of France:

- Defence of Escaut
- St Omer–La Bassée
- Wormhoudt
- Cassel
