= Gilbert Collett =

English sportsman

- Born: Gilbert Faraday Collett; 18 July 1879 Gloucester, Gloucestershire, England
- Died: 25 February 1945 (aged 65) Huddlecote, Gloucestershire, England
- School: Cheltenham College
- University: Pembroke College, Cambridge
- Occupation: Chemical Manufacturer

Rugby union career
- Position: Wing
Amateur team(s)
Years	Team	Apps	(Points)
- Cambridge University R.U.F.C.
–	Cheltenham RFC		
–	Barbarians		
International career
Years	Team	Apps	(Points)
1903	British Isles	3	(0)

Lt. Colonel Gilbert Faraday Collett DSO (18 July 1879 – 25 February 1945) was an English sportsman who was an international rugby union wing and first-class cricketer for Gloucestershire County Cricket Club. As a rugby footballer he represented Cambridge University and Cheltenham at club level. Collett also played international rugby for the British Isles during the 1903 tour of South Africa but was never selected for the England national team.

== Personal history ==
Collett was born in 1879 in Wynstone Place, near Gloucester to John Martin Collett, of Guy's Cliff, Wolton. He was educated at Cheltenham College before matriculating to Pembroke College, Cambridge in 1898. He gained his BA in 1901, and his MA in 1905, before becoming managing director of family company, J. M. Collett and Co. Ltd, a chemical manufacturer.

A prewar officer in the 5th Battalion, Gloucestershire Regiment of the Territorial Force, Collett was called up on the outbreak of the First World War, and later succeeded became commanding officer of the 2/5th Battalion of the Gloucesters with the rank of lieutenant-colonel. During the war Collett was Mentioned in Despatches three times and was awarded the Distinguished Service Order. In 1934, on reaching the age of 55 he was retired from the Territorials, but retained his rank and uniform.

== Rugby career ==
Collett first came to note as a rugby player when he represented Cambridge University. In 1898, Collett was part of the Cambridge team that faced Oxford University in the Varsity Match, winning his first and only sporting 'Blue'. After Oxford lost Nelson, their captain, to an ankle injury, Cambridge took control of the forward positions and won the game comfortably. The 1898/99 season saw Collett invited to join touring team, the Barbarians.

By 1903, Collett was playing club rugby for Cheltenham and county rugby for Gloucestershire. Although he had not played international rugby before, he was offered a place on the 1903 British Isles tour of South Africa. Collett played in 20 of the 22 match tour, including all three Test games against the South African national team. Collett was a prolific scoring during the first half of the tour, with a dropped goal in his first match against an invitational Western Province Country team, followed by eight tries over the next 11 games, including two tries in both games against King William's Town and Griqualand West. In the final eight games he was selected for, including the three tests, Collett failed to add to his score tally.

During the First World War, Collett was touch judge for a rugby match played between British troops from the Gloucestershire Regiment, which included club county and international players. The match was played between the South Midland Division (48th) and the 4th Division.

== Bibliography ==
- Marshall, Howard; Jordon, J.P. (1951). Oxford v Cambridge, The Story of the University Rugby Match. London: Clerke & Cockeran.
