= Saint-Benin =

- Commune
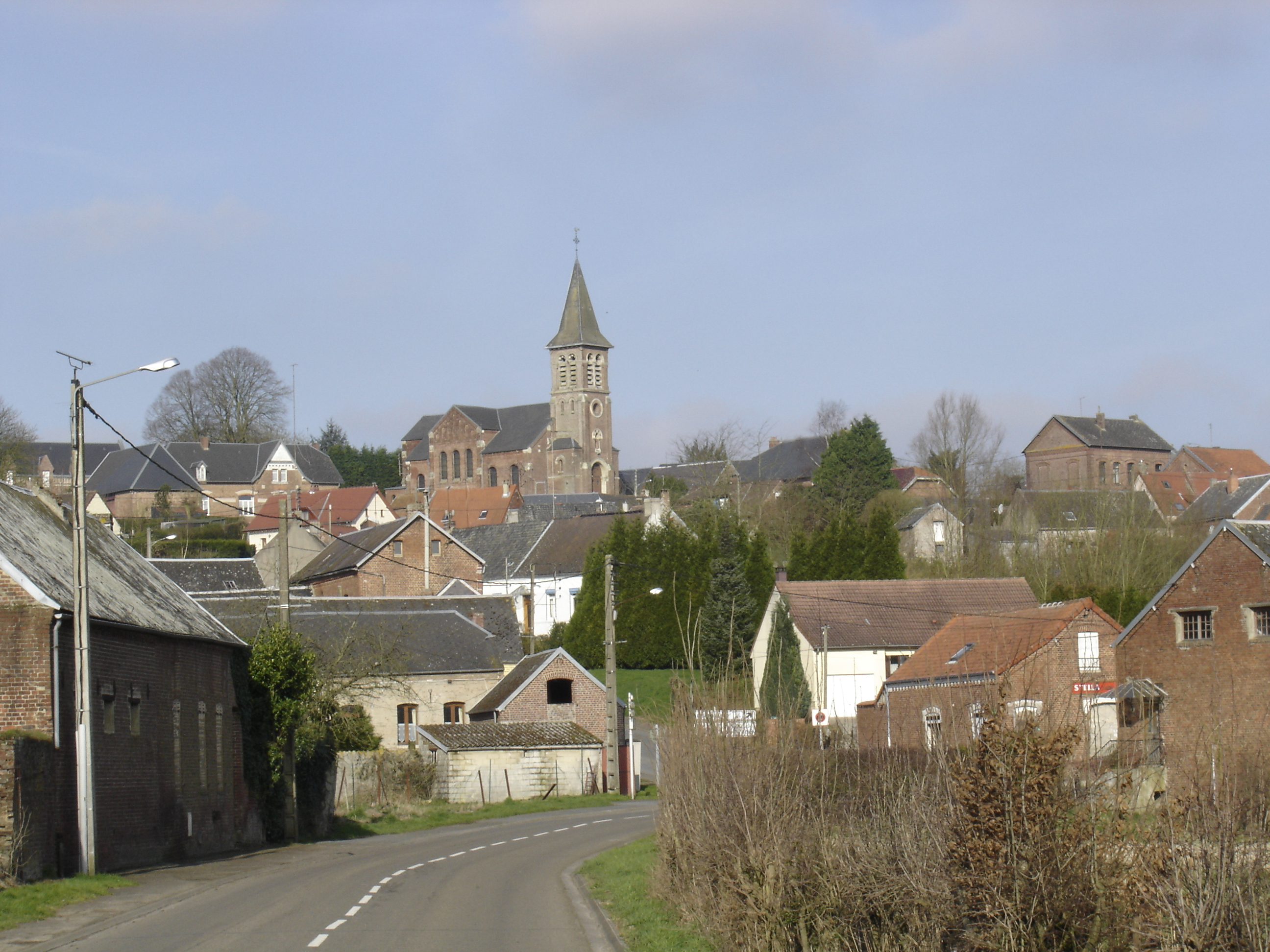
- A view within Saint-Benin

- Coat of arms
- Location of Saint-Benin
- Location within France Location within Hauts-de-France
- Coordinates: 50°04′39″N 3°31′45″E
- Country: France
- Region: Hauts-de-France
- Department: Nord
- Arrondissement: Cambrai
- Canton: Le Cateau-Cambrésis
- Intercommunality: CA Caudrésis–Catésis

Government
  - Mayor (2020–2026): Véronique Nicaise
- Area^{1}: 4.66 km^{2} (1.80 sq mi)
- Highest elevation: 153 m (502 ft)
- Lowest elevation: 97 m (318 ft)
- Population (2023): 343
  - Density: 73.6/km^{2} (191/sq mi)
- Time zone: UTC+01:00 (CET)
  - Summer (DST): UTC+02:00 (CEST)
- INSEE/Postal code: 59531 /59360
- ^{1} French Land Register data, which excludes lakes, ponds, glaciers > 1 km^{2} (0.386 sq mi or 247 acres) and river estuaries.

Saint-Benin (French pronunciation: [sɛ̃ bənɛ̃]) is a commune in the Nord department in northern France.

== Heraldry ==
| Arms of Saint-Benin | The arms of Saint-Benin are blazoned : Gules, a rose slipped and leaved argent. (Bazuel, Maretz and Saint-Benin use the same arms.) |

== See also ==
- Communes of the Nord department
