= Maretz =

- Commune
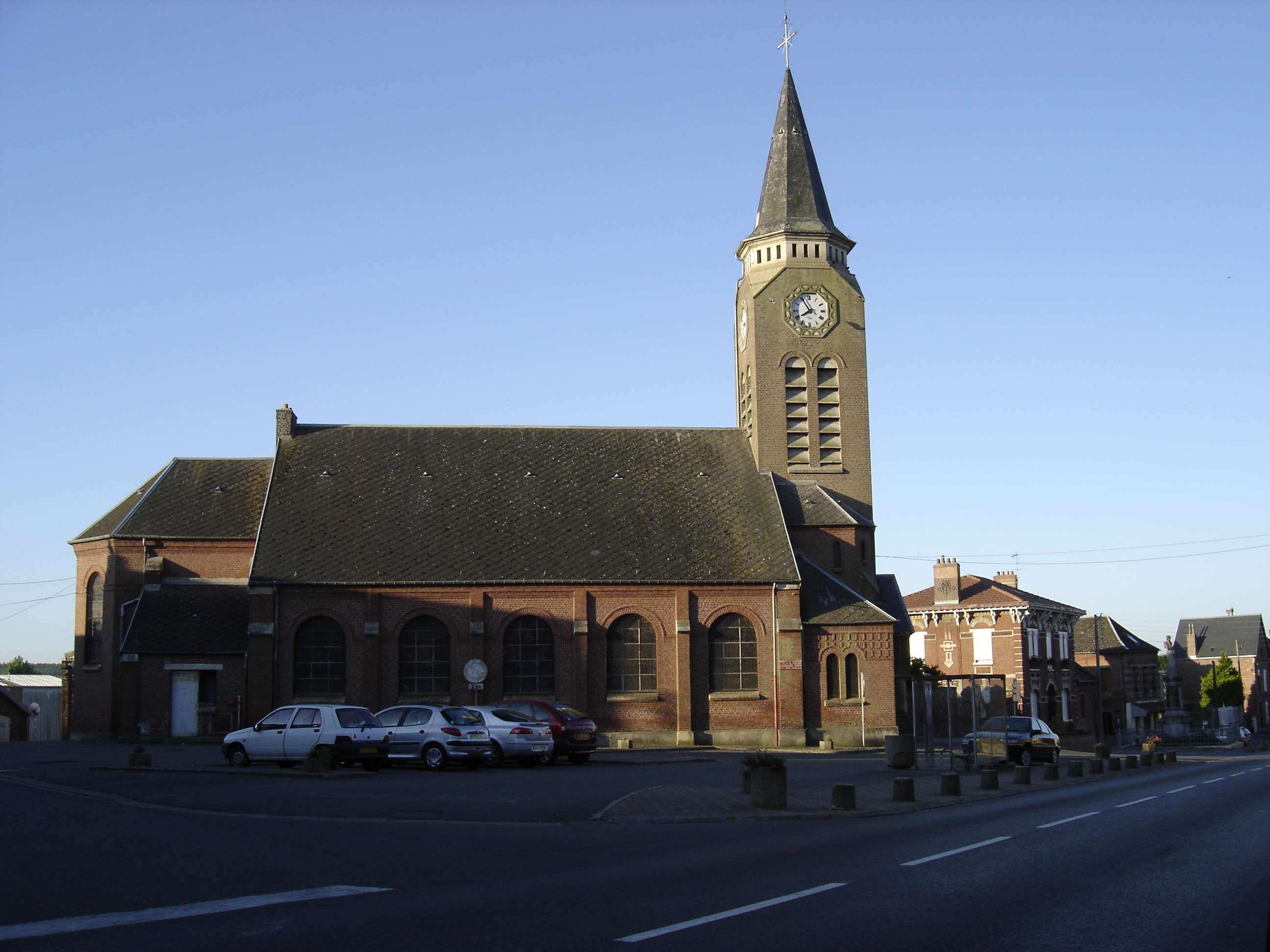
- The church in Maretz

- Coat of arms
- Location of Maretz
- Location within France Location within Hauts-de-France
- Coordinates: 50°02′49″N 3°25′11″E
- Country: France
- Region: Hauts-de-France
- Department: Nord
- Arrondissement: Cambrai
- Canton: Le Cateau-Cambrésis
- Intercommunality: CA Caudrésis–Catésis

Government
  - Mayor (2022–2026): Monique Lesne Setiaux
- Area^{1}: 11.28 km^{2} (4.36 sq mi)
- Elevation: 160 m (520 ft)
- Highest elevation: 166 m (545 ft)
- Lowest elevation: 123 m (404 ft)
- Population (2023): 1,402
  - Density: 124.3/km^{2} (321.9/sq mi)
- Time zone: UTC+01:00 (CET)
  - Summer (DST): UTC+02:00 (CEST)
- INSEE/Postal code: 59382 /59238
- ^{1} French Land Register data, which excludes lakes, ponds, glaciers > 1 km^{2} (0.386 sq mi or 247 acres) and river estuaries.

Maretz is a commune in the Nord department in northern France. It is 22 km south east of Cambrai. As of 2019, the population is 1,444.

== Heraldry ==
Arms of Maretz	The arms of Maretz are blazoned : Gules, a rose slipped and leaved argent. (Bazuel, Maretz and Saint-Benin use the same arms.)

== See also ==
- Communes of the Nord department
