= Royal Pioneer Corps =

British Army combatant corps

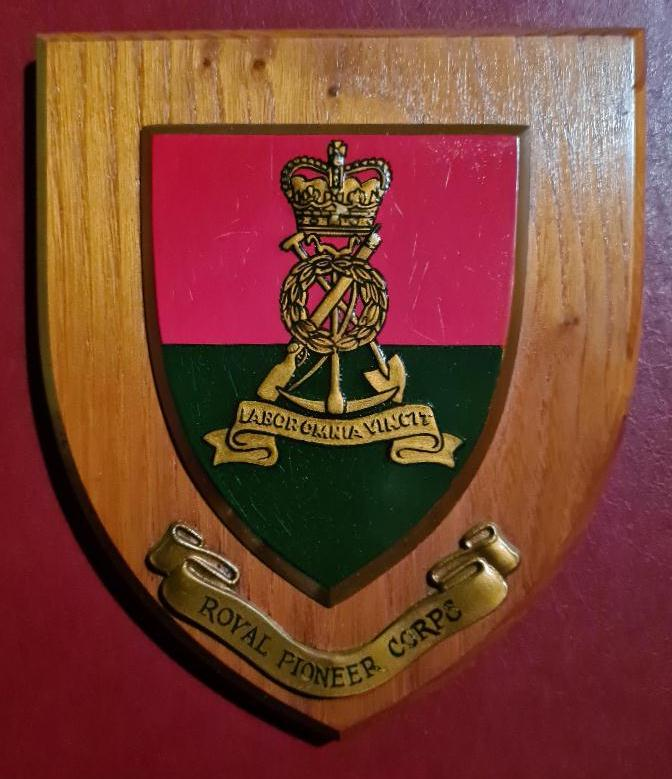
- Active: 1917–1921 (as Labour Corps); 1939–1993
- Allegiance: United Kingdom
- Branch: British Army
- Role: Light engineering tasks
- Garrison/HQ: Northampton
- Nickname: Chunkies
- Motto: Labor omnia vincit
- Colors: Red and Green
- March: Pioneer Corps

The Royal Pioneer Corps was a British Army corps used for light engineering tasks. It was formed in 1939, and amalgamated into the Royal Logistic Corps in 1993. Pioneer units performed a wide variety of tasks in all theatres of war, including Northern Ireland. They were used for full infantry, mine clearance, guarding bases, laying prefabricated track on beaches, and effecting various logistical operations. Many pioneer companies took part in the Normandy landings and after the Second World War, the corps was given the designation "Royal".

== Predecessors ==
The first record of pioneers in a British army goes back to 1346 at Calais where the pay and muster rolls of the English garrison show pay records for pioneers. Traditionally, there was a pioneer for each company in a regiment; these were the ancestors of the assault pioneers. In about 1750, it was proposed that a Corps of Pioneers be formed. Nothing came of this for nearly one hundred years, until the Army Works Corps was established during the Crimean War in 1854. The Labour Corps was formed in 1917 during the First World War, during which it employed 325,000 British troops, 98,000 Chinese, 10,000 Africans and at least 300,000 other labourers in units such as the Chinese Labour Corps and Maltese Labour Corps.

== History ==
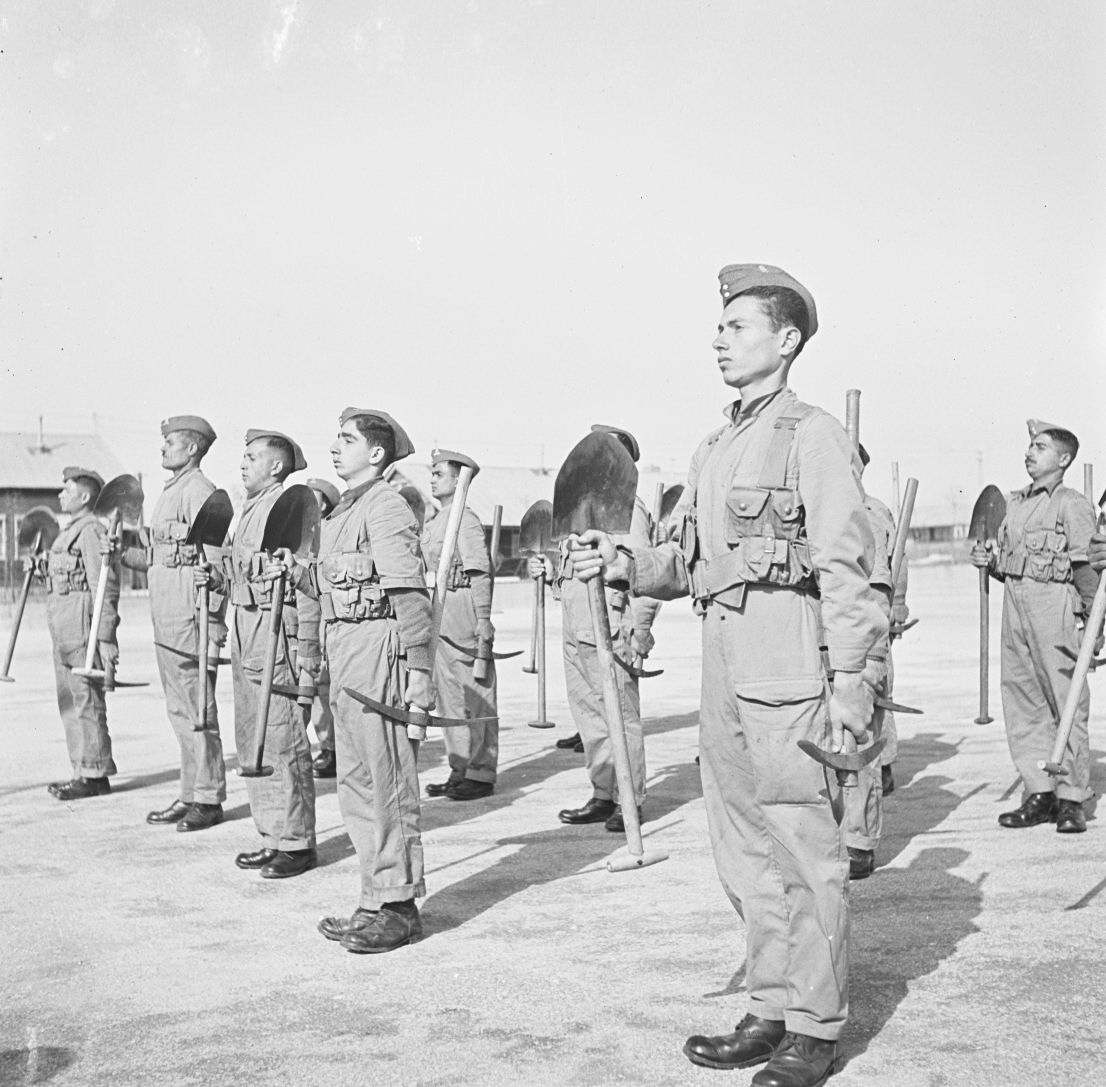
A Pioneer Corps Company recruited in Mandatory Palestine, 1942.

In September 1939, a number of infantry and cavalry reservists were formed into Works Labour Companies, which became the Auxiliary Military Pioneer Corps (AMPC) on 17 October 1939; a Labour Directorate was created to control all labour force matters. The name "Pioneer" was chosen as it was thought to be more prestigious than the term "Labour" used in the previous war. The original establishment was six Group Headquarters, each of between 300 and 500 men. Most of the officers had retired from the infantry and cavalry, and had fought in the First World War. The role of the AMPC included building military roads and railway lines, construction of airfields, camps, air-raid shelters and fortifications, and any other labouring tasks required.

A large number of Pioneers served in France with the British Expeditionary Force. During the Battle of France in May 1940, No. 5 Group AMPC commanded by Lieutenant Colonel Donald Dean VC, were engaged in labouring tasks in the Doullens area, near Amiens, when the group were threatened by the advancing Germans. After requisitioning a train, and following a fire-fight with the leading German units, the Group were able to reach Boulogne-sur-Mer. Here Dean was ordered to help establish a defensive perimeter around the town. On 23 May, the Germans attacked in earnest; in fierce fighting at their barricades, the pioneers destroyed one tank by igniting petrol underneath it. The pioneers were the last to fall back from the perimeter and most were evacuated from the harbour. Further to the south, on 18 May, an infantry brigade was improvised from several AMPC Companies under the command of Lieutenant-Colonel J. B. H. Diggle. Known as "Digforce", the brigade became part of Beauman Division and fought in defence of the Andelle and Béthune rivers on 8 June 1940 against the 5th and 7th Panzer Divisions. Digforce and thousands of other BEF Pioneers were evacuated to England in Operation Aerial. An unknown number of AMPC troops were killed when the HMT Lancastria was sunk off St Nazaire on 17 June.

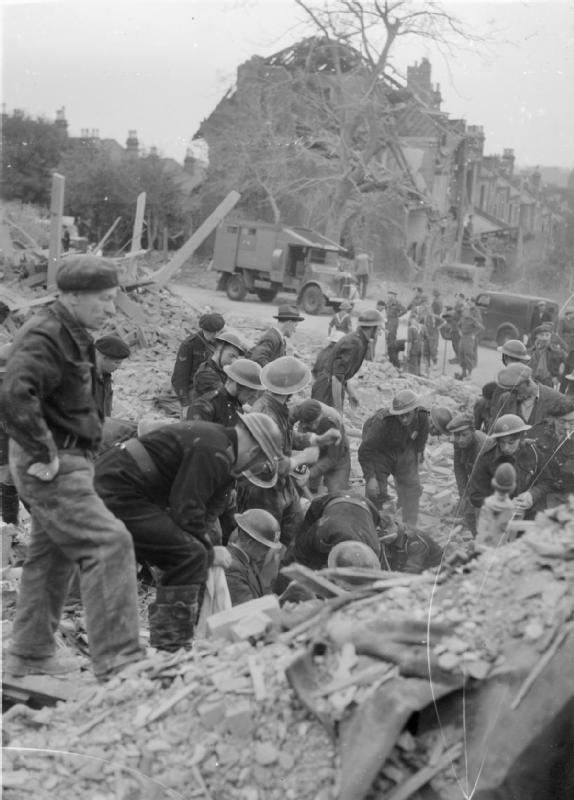
Pioneers assist Civil Defence rescue workers in the aftermath of a V-1 flying bomb in London, 1944.

During the Battle of Britain and the Blitz, Pioneers worked with the Royal Engineers in bomb disposal, and with the civilian services to rescue trapped people and clear rubble. On 22 November 1940, the name AMPC was changed to Pioneer Corps. In March 1941, James Scully was awarded the George Cross. Corps members have won thirteen George Medals and many other lesser awards.

A total of 23 pioneer companies took part in the Normandy landings. The novelist Alexander Baron served in one of these Beach Groups and later included some of his experiences in his novels From the City From the Plough and The Human Kind; he also wrote a radio play about the experience of being stranded on a craft attempting to land supplies on the beaches of Normandy. Nos. 85 and 149 Companies, Pioneer Corps served with the 6th Beach Group assisting the units landing on Sword Beach on D Day, 6 June 1944.

The peak strength of the Pioneer Corps in 1944-45 was 444,591 all ranks: some 10,000 were killed. On 28 November 1946, in recognition of their performance during the Second World War, King George VI decreed that the Pioneer Corps should have the distinction "Royal" added to its title.

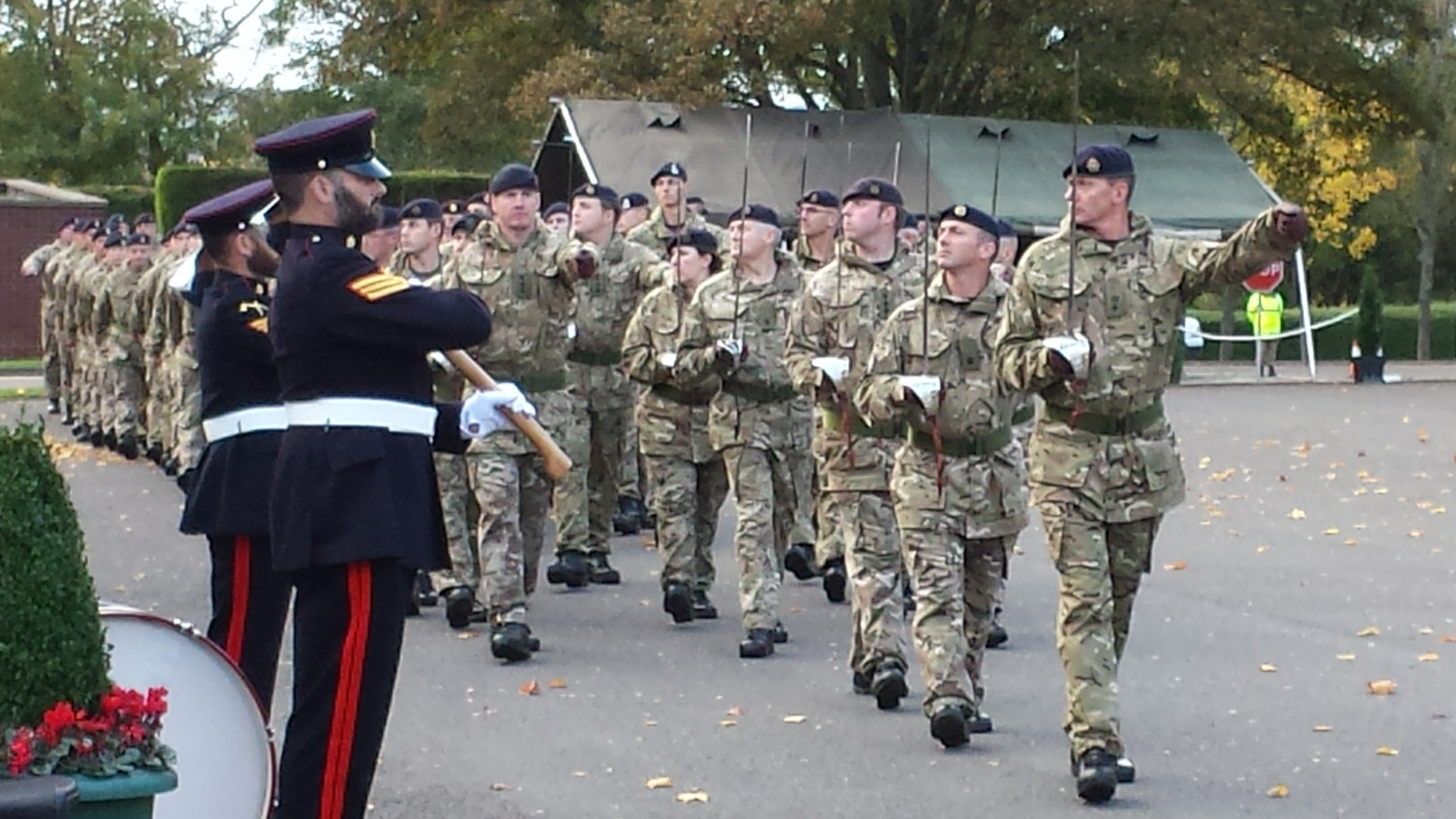
Disbandment Parade of 168 Pioneer Regiment, Royal Logistic Corps in October 2013.

In April 1993, following the Options for Change review, the Royal Pioneer Corps was joined with the Royal Corps of Transport, the Royal Army Ordnance Corps, the Army Catering Corps, and the Postal and Courier Service of the Royal Engineers to form the Royal Logistic Corps.

The last unit to retain the "pioneer" title, 23 Pioneer Regiment, Royal Logistic Corps, which saw action in operations in Iraq and Afghanistan, was disbanded in 2014. A 'farewell' parade was held on 26 September at St David's Barracks, MoD Bicester in Oxfordshire; it was attended by Prince Richard, Duke of Gloucester. The regiment's ceremonial axes continue to be used by the Royal Logistic Corps.

== Wartime recruitment ==
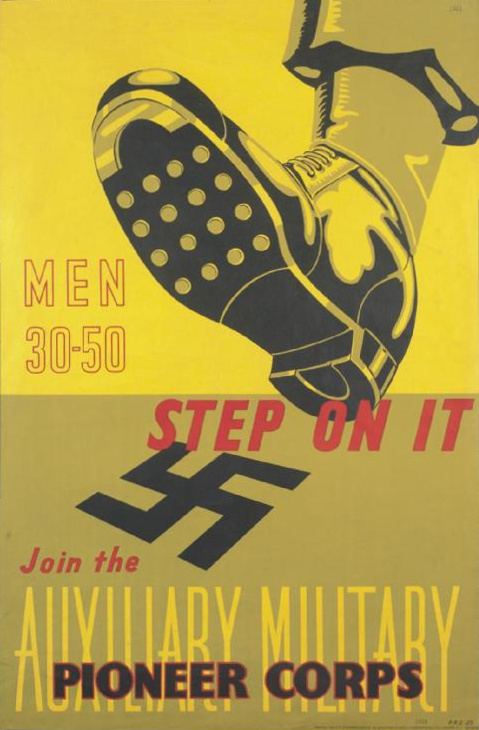
"Step on it – Join the Auxiliary Military Pioneer Corps" a Second World War recruitment poster

The initial composition of the AMPC was of reservists who had been called back to service in infantry or cavalry units, but were not able to be placed, either because their unit was fully manned, or if they failed to meet the physical standard required. Further recruitment was of older men from areas of high unemployment or conscripts who were found to be unfit for front-line service. From 1941, Pioneer officers were dispatched around the British Empire to recruit and train volunteers from colonies and territories in the Mediterranean, Africa and Asia. A total of about 400,000 served in these units.

It has been said at various times that British conscientious objectors were sometimes ordered into the Pioneer Corps by Conscientious Objection Tribunals in the Second World War; this may have arisen from a question in the House of Lords on 22 July 1941 and a reply by Lord Croft, joint Under-Secretary of State for War, that was not expressed with the clarity that might have been expected.

=== Alien Companies ===
In the early part of the Second World War, the Pioneer Corps was the only British military unit in which enemy aliens could serve. Thousands of German and Austrian nationals joined the Pioneer Corps to assist Allied war efforts and the liberation of their home countries, forming a total of fifteen companies. They typically were Jews and political opponents of the Nazi Regime who had fled to Britain, including film production designer Ken Adam, writers George Clare and Arthur Koestler, and publisher Robert Maxwell.

Later, some members of Pioneer Corps—often dubbed "The King's Most Loyal Enemy Aliens"—transferred to serve in various fighting units. Some were recruited by the Special Operations Executive (SOE) to serve as secret agents and were parachuted behind enemy lines. Others were recruited into No. 3 Troop ("X" Troop) of No. 10 (Inter-Allied) Commando, a unit composed entirely of German-speaking refugees, mostly Jewish, who operated in small teams with the Commando Forces. Some two dozen German-speaking Pioneers were recruited into the 21st Independent Parachute Company, a unit trained as pathfinders for major parachute assaults, and served with distinction in Operation Market Garden.

Serving as a German or Austrian national in the British forces was especially dangerous because, in case of being taken captive, there was a high probability of being executed as a traitor by the Germans. Still, the number of German-born Jews joining the British forces was exceptionally high; by the end of the war, one in seven Jewish refugees from Germany had joined the British forces. Their knowledge of the German language and customs proved particularly useful; many served in the administration of the British occupation army in Germany and Austria after the war.

German-speaking Pioneers were also recruited by MI19 as translators at interrogation centres for prisoners of war. These centres, most notably the "Cockfosters Cage" at Trent Park north of London, were fitted with covert listening devices that could overhear conversations between high-ranking German officers, a source of much valuable intelligence. The British linguists initially employed to transcribe the Germans' speech were often found to be unable to understand their slang and jargon, so from late 1943, around one hundred well-educated native German speakers were recruited from the Pioneer Corps.

The Pioneer Corps recruited from among Spanish exiles after the Spanish Civil War. No.1 Spanish Company was formed. There was also one Indian and two Czech companies, recruited from expatriates living in Britain.

== Colonels Commandant ==
Colonels Commandant of the corps were:

- 1940–1948: F.M. The Rt Hon George Milne, 1st Baron Milne of Salonika
- ?1940–1950: Lt-Col. (Hon. Brig.) John Bartlett Hillary
- 1950–1961: Gen. Sir Frank Ernest Wallace Simpson
- 1961–1968: Lt-Gen. Sir John Cowley
- 1968–1976: Lt-Gen. Sir J. Noel Thomas
- 1976–1981: Gen. Sir William Gerald Hugh Beach
- 1981–1983: Gen. Sir George Leslie Conroy Cooper
- 1983–1986: Brig. Alan Frederick Mutch
- 1986–1987: Maj-Gen. John James Stibbon
- 1987: Brig. Frederick John Lucas
- Maj-Gen. Geoffrey William Field (to Royal Logistic Corps, 1993)
- 1993: Royal Pioneer Corps merged with Royal Corps of Transport, Royal Army Ordnance Corps, Army Catering Corps, and the Postal and Courier Service of the Royal Engineers to form the Royal Logistic Corps

== Notable members ==
- Alexander Baron (1917–1999), served 1939-1945, author of the 1948, published From the City, from The Plough
- Francis George Miles VC (1896–1961), served during World War II
- Richard Stanley Hawks Moody, who, in 1916, raised a battalion of the Labour Corps, which he commanded from 1917 to 1918 and took to France
- James Scully GC (1909–1974), served from 1941 to 1943
- Paddy O'Daire (1905 –1981), Irish soldier who rose to rank of Major within the Corps. A left-wing activist who also fought in the Irish War of Independence, the Irish Civil War and the Spanish Civil War with the XV International Brigade
