= Campbell baronets of Aberuchil (c.1668) =

Escutcheon of the Campbells baronets of Aberuchil

The Campbell baronetcy, of Aberuchil in the County of Perth, was created in the Baronetage of Nova Scotia in c. 1668 for Colin Campbell.

== Campbell baronets, of Aberuchil (c. 1668) ==
- Sir Colin Campbell, 1st Baronet (died 1704)
- Sir James Campbell, 2nd Baronet (c. 1672–1754)
- Sir James Campbell, 3rd Baronet (1723–1812)
- Sir Alexander Campbell, 4th Baronet (1757–1824)
- Sir James Campbell, 5th Baronet (1818–1903)
- Sir Alexander Campbell, 6th Baronet (1841–1914)
- Sir John Alexander Coldstream Campbell, 7th Baronet (1877–1960)
- Sir Colin Moffat Campbell, 8th Baronet (1925–1997)
- Sir James Alexander Moffat Bain Campbell, 9th Baronet (born 1956)

The heir apparent to the baronetcy is Colin George Denman Bain Campbell of Aberuchill (born 1999).
