= Bazuel =

- Commune
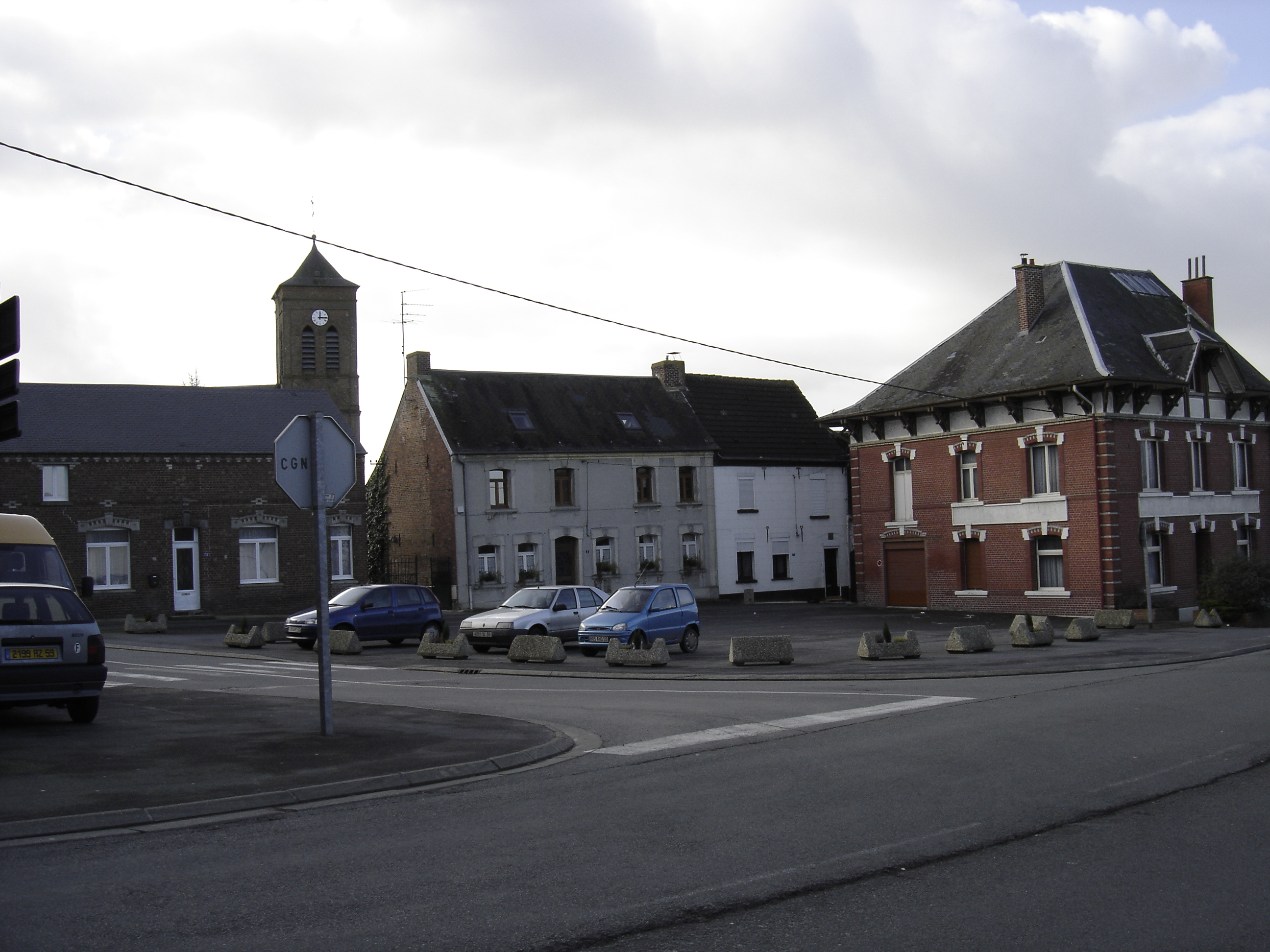
- A view within Bazuel

- Coat of arms
- Location of Bazuel
- Location within France Location within Hauts-de-France
- Coordinates: 50°05′30″N 3°35′21″E
- Country: France
- Region: Hauts-de-France
- Department: Nord
- Arrondissement: Cambrai
- Canton: Le Cateau-Cambrésis
- Intercommunality: CA Caudrésis–Catésis

Government
  - Mayor (2020–2026): Jean-Félix Macarez
- Area^{1}: 11.81 km^{2} (4.56 sq mi)
- Highest elevation: 158 m (518 ft)
- Lowest elevation: 112 m (367 ft)
- Population (2023): 551
  - Density: 46.7/km^{2} (121/sq mi)
- Time zone: UTC+01:00 (CET)
  - Summer (DST): UTC+02:00 (CEST)
- INSEE/Postal code: 59055 /59360
- ^{1} French Land Register data, which excludes lakes, ponds, glaciers > 1 km^{2} (0.386 sq mi or 247 acres) and river estuaries.

Bazuel (French pronunciation: [bazɥɛl]) is a commune in the Nord department in northern France.

It is 4 km (2.5 mi) southeast of Le Cateau-Cambrésis, and 25 km (16 mi) southeast of Cambrai.

== Population ==
Historical population
Year	Pop.	±% p.a.
1968	801	—
1975	795	−0.11%
1982	726	−1.29%
1990	674	−0.92%
1999	571	−1.83%
2007	602	+0.66%
2012	547	−1.90%
2017	525	−0.82%
2023	551	+0.81%
Source: INSEE

== Heraldry ==
Arms of Basuel	The arms of Bazuel are blazoned : Gules, a rose slipped and leaved argent. (Bazuel, Maretz and Saint-Benin use the same arms.)

== See also ==
- Communes of the Nord department
