= Francis George Miles =

Francis George Miles VC
- Born: 9 July 1896; Clearwell, Gloucestershire, England
- Died: 8 November 1961 (aged 65); Clearwell
- Burial place: Cemetery, Clearwell
- Military career
- Allegiance: United Kingdom
- Branch: British Army
- Rank: Private
- Units: The Gloucestershire Regiment; Pioneer Corps
- Conflicts: World War I World War II
- Awards: Victoria Cross

Francis George Miles VC (9 July 1896 – 8 November 1961) was an English recipient of the Victoria Cross, the highest and most prestigious award for gallantry in the face of the enemy that can be awarded to British and Commonwealth forces.

He was 22 years old, and a Private in the 1/5th Battalion, The Gloucestershire Regiment, British Army during the First World War when the following deed took place for which he was awarded the VC.

On 23 October 1918 at Bois-l'Évêque, Landrecies, France, when his company was held up by a line of enemy machine guns in a sunken road, Private Miles, alone and on his own initiative went forward under exceptionally heavy fire, located a machine gun, shot the gunner and put the gun out of action. Then seeing another gun nearby, he again went forward alone, shot the gunner and captured the team of eight. Finally he stood up and beckoned to his company who, acting on his signals, were able to capture 16 machine guns, one officer and 50 other ranks.

He joined up again in World War II serving with the Pioneer Corps.

His medals are held in the Lord Ashcroft VC collection in the Imperial War Museum in London.
