= Wijesekera =

Wijesekera is a surname. Notable people with the surname include:

- Duleep Wijesekera, Sri Lankan politician
- Duminda Wijesekera, American computer scientist
- Kanchana Wijesekera (born 1982), Sri Lankan politician
- Priyani Wijesekera, Sri Lankan lawyer
