= Social collectivity =

Sociology term

Sociologists have defined a collectivity as a social system, as an aggregate of organisms, or as a definable social order wherein the members have a sense of membership. Collectivities comprise a central element of much modern sociological theory.

In terms of sociological categories, a community can seem like a sub-set of a social collectivity. In developmental views, a community can emerge out of a collectivity.

== Origins ==
In the context of group formation and development, Norma C. Lang identifies four major types of collectivity:

- proto-groups
- abortive groups
- superseded sub-groups
- growth groups

== See also ==
- Collective identity
- Community
- Nation
- Social group
- Society
- Types of social groups
