= Bahamut Gamer's Community =

Taiwanese ACG Internet forum

- Website type: Internet forum, news website
- Available in: Traditional Chinese
- Predecessors: Bahamut BBS （1996.10 —2000.3）
- Owner: Oneup Network Corporation
- Creator: Chen Chien-hung
- Website: www.gamer.com.tw
- Commercial: Yes
- Registration: Optional
- Users: More than 6,710,000 (May 2026)
- Launched: October 28, 1996; 29 years ago
- Current status: Active
- Native clients on: Computer version Web Browser, mobile version mobile application, etc
- Content licence: Taiwan Website Classification Promotion Foundation: Taiwan Website Content Classification Standards
- Written in: PHP、JavaScript

Oneup Network Corporation
- Trade name: Bahamut
- Native name: 旺普網路資訊股份有限公司
- Type: Private
- Industry: Internet
- Founded: Registration: February 24, 2000; 26 years ago Incorporated: March 3, 2000; 26 years ago
- Founder: Chen Chien-hung; Chen Chien-jen
- Headquarters: 13th and 15th Floors, No. 420, Fuxing North Road, Zhongshan District, Taipei, Taiwan
- Key people: Hsueh Chao-ling (Chairman); Chen Chien-hung (Chief Executive Officer); Chen Chien-jen (Deputy Chief Executive Officer)
- Revenue: NT$300 million (2022)
- Total equity: NT$100 million (October 2019)
- Owners: Hsueh Chao-ling (20.7%); Chen Chien-jen (28.2%); Chen Chien-hung (51.0%)
- Number of employees: 80 (February 2026)
- Subsidiaries: Oneup Telecom Corporation
- Website: www.gamer.com.tw

Bahamut Gamer's Community (Chinese: 巴哈姆特電玩資訊站; pinyin: Bāhāmǔtè diànwán zīxùn zhàn), commonly known as Bahamut, is a Taiwanese internet forum and news website focused on anime, comics, and video games (ACG). It was founded by Chen Chien-hung in October 1996. The platform initially operated as a bulletin board system (BBS), then transitioned to a web-based interface in November 1999 and began commercial operations in February 2000.The website attracted approximately 240 users on its first day of operation and grew to more than 3,000 users by March 1997 following media coverage of its founder. As of May 2026, Bahamut reported more than 6.71 million registered members, over 13.7 million user-generated posts, and more than 132.6 billion page views. It is one of Taiwan's most visited websites and the largest Chinese-language online community dedicated to video games, anime, and comics. Bahamut operates discussion forums, game and anime databases, the GNN news service, the video game program Bahamut Game Crazy, an online marketplace, and the anime streaming platform Bahamut Animation Crazy. The company also organizes community gatherings, markets, competitions, and award programs related to gaming, anime, and comics culture in Taiwan.

== History ==
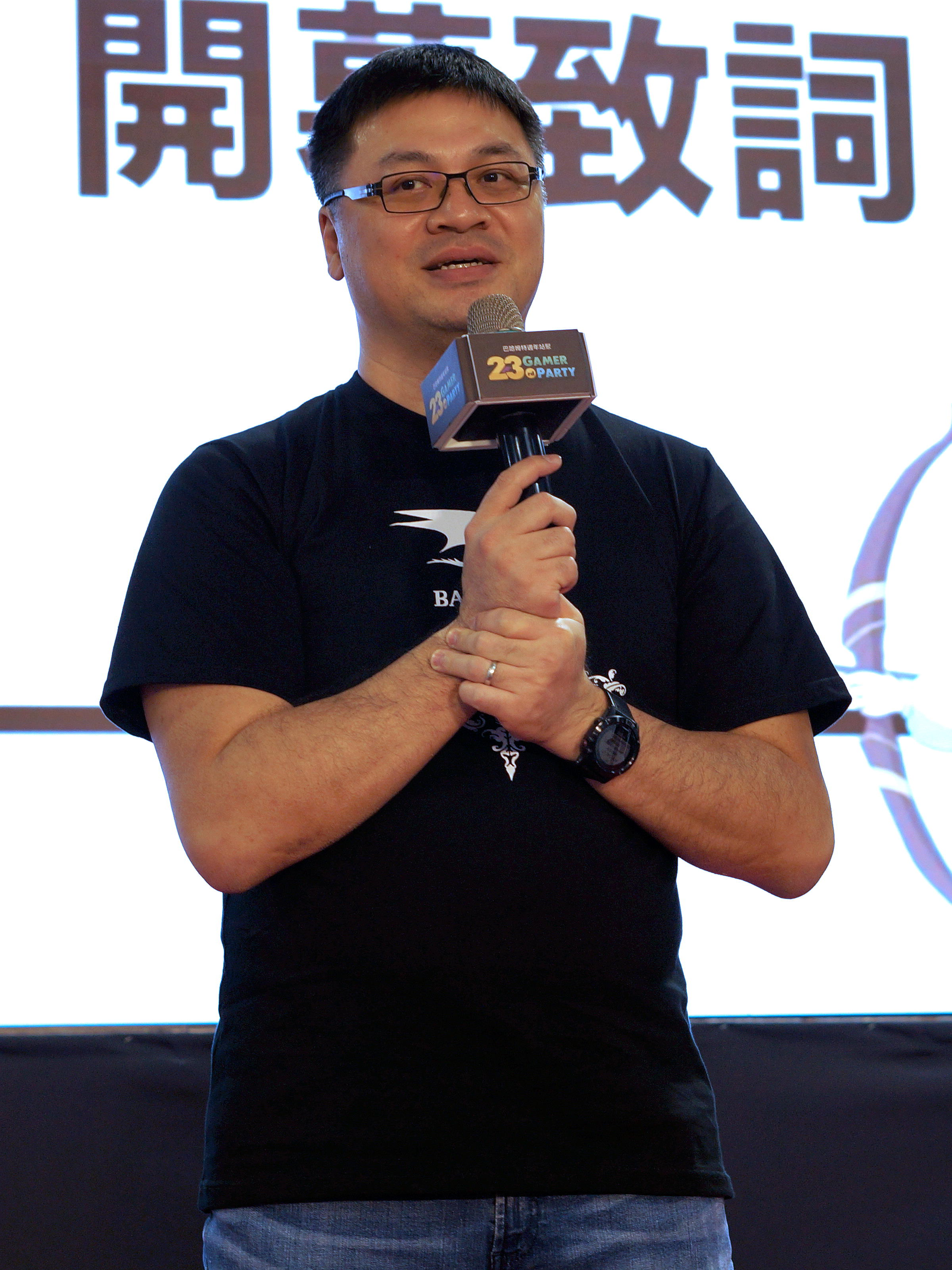
Founder Chen Chien-hung

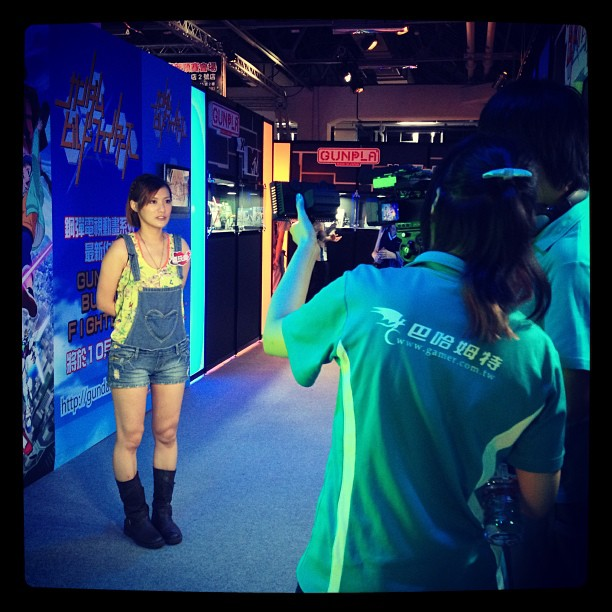
The production team of Bahamut Game Crazy covering a Gunpla Expo event

=== Establishment ===
Bahamut originated as Bahamut BBS, a bulletin board system established on the Taiwan Academic Network on 28 October 1996 by Chen Chien-hung, then a graduate student in the Department of Computer Science and Information Engineering at National Central University. The service was officially announced to the public on 10 November 1996. The site's name was derived from Bahamut, the dragon-like creature appearing in the Final Fantasy series, and its logo was likewise inspired by the character's in-game appearance.

Bahamut recorded 247 users on its first day of operation. In March 1997, following Chen's appearance on the television program Game Club hosted by Bright Pu, the number of users exceeded 3,000 in a single day. After Chen graduated and began his compulsory military service in July 1997, management of the Bahamut server was transferred to his cousin, Chen Chien-jen. The server was subsequently relocated from National Central University to Chung Hua University 's computer center. In November 1999, Bahamut left the Taiwan Academic Network and transitioned from a BBS-based system to a web-based platform.

=== Commercialization ===
After leaving his position as a programmer at Yahoo! Kimo in 1999, Chen Chien-hung and several partners founded Oneup Network Corporation in Taipei on 3 March 2000 to operate Bahamut commercially. The platform was formally renamed Bahamut Gamer's Community. During its early years as a commercial website, Bahamut introduced several services, including the Bahamut ACG Database, GNN Game News, and the Gamer's Almanac. On 21 September 2000, the site adopted a for-profit business model and achieved its first monthly break-even point in November 2001.

In 2003, the company established dedicated advertising and e-commerce divisions, expanding its business through online advertising and the Bahamut online store. The same year, Bahamut launched its web-based discussion forum, Hala Zone, and introduced avatar customization, user-created content services, virtual currency, and experience-point systems to encourage community participation. Bahamut also expanded into video production. In April 2007, the television program MTV Bahamut Game Crazy premiered on MTV Taiwan, although production ended later that year. A subsequent collaboration with Chinese Television System resulted in Super Game Crazy in 2010, which likewise ended that year. In December 2010, Bahamut launched Bahamut Game Crazy, a high-definition online video game program distributed through YouTube.

=== Expansion ===
Since June 2008, Bahamut has organized the Bahamut Game and Anime Awards, an annual online voting event in which registered users select outstanding games, novels, and animated works. In 2011, the company launched the Bahamut ACG Creation Awards, a recurring competition recognizing creators of anime, comics, and game-related works through evaluation by industry professionals and public voting.

Beginning in 2014, Bahamut partnered with Professor Liang Shih-yu of National Chiao Tung University to establish the Bahamut Paper Awards and organize the International Conference of ACG Studies. In 2021, the event was renamed the International Symposium Conference on ACG Culture and Bahamut Paper Awards. Bahamut has also collaborated with the Taiwan Creative Content Agency to establish special awards promoting research and creative work related to anime, comics, and video games in Taiwan. The society organization relocated to Japan in 2023 and renamed the "International Symposium on ACG Culture and Technology and Bahamut Paper Award" (ACGCT).

== Services ==
Bahamut Gamer Information Station offers a range of services, including GNN Game News, the internet forum section “Halá District”, the Creation Hall, the Hero Avatar system, Bahamut Animation Crazy, the Bahamut Mall, Bahamut Now!, the Bahamut PC Hardware Store, the Bahamut Sticker Store, the Hero Activity Feed, the Bahamut ACG Database, and Bahamut Game Crazy. Although the platform has transitioned from a bulletin board system (BBS) to a web-based interface, the “Bahamut BBS” remains operational.

“GNN Game News” (Game News Network) was originally named after the U.S. Cable News Network. Its first article, covering Phantasy Star Online, was published on November 20, 2000. The service now covers the latest information on video games across multiple platforms, as well as anime, manga, light novels, model figures, exhibition coverage, and feature reports. In March 2002, the “Bahamut Mall” service was launched, marking the platform’s entry into e-commerce. In November 2003, web-based versions of the forums (“Halá District”), the avatar system (“Paper Doll”/ “Hero Avatar”), and the Creation Hall were introduced. The platform’s internal chat-based instant messaging service, “Hero Summoner,” was launched in November 2006. It was replaced in February 2018 by the instant messaging application “HahaMuTe BuEY,” which was later succeeded by “Bahamut Now!” in January 2024.

To improve information accessibility, Bahamut integrated its Game Data Library, Anime Special Zone, and Encyclopedia into the “Bahamut ACG Database” in August 2008, introducing wiki-style editing, personalization, and enhanced search functionality. The mobile version and official application were launched in September 2009 and January 2013, respectively. The OTT anime streaming platform “Bahamut Animation Crazy” was launched in January 2016. The “Hero Activity Feed” app was released in September 2018, with a web version launched in April 2021, offering personalized content-tracking features. In March 2024, in collaboration with Sinya Digital, the Bahamut PC Hardware Store was launched, offering hardware discussion, purchasing, and after-sales services. In June 2024, sticker functionality was introduced to forums and creation services, along with the launch of the Bahamut Sticker Store.

== Reception and evaluation ==
By late January 2001, the number of registered members of Bahamut Gamer Information Station had reached 100,000. In July 2004, a report by the Internet measurement company InsightXplorer (“ARO Internet Measurement Study”) ranked Bahamut as the 20th-largest website, accounting for 11.34% of Taiwan’s internet population, with an average of 148 pages viewed per user, the fourth-highest in Taiwan. In August 2005, the site was listed among the top 500 global websites in an Alexa Internet survey. By 2006, membership had grown rapidly to 650,000 users, while the peak number of unique daily visitors reached 2.16 million, equivalent to one in every 13.8 people in the Taiwan, Hong Kong and Macao region visiting Bahamut. According to Business Next, Bahamut entered the global top 200 websites in 2006; in 2007, it ranked 6th among Taiwanese websites and 137th globally in Alexa traffic rankings. In 2009, it became the third-most-visited website in Taiwan, according to Alexa rankings.

In 2010, Bahamut was ranked 8th in Business Next’s Taiwan Top 100 Websites list. In the December 2014 web traffic rankings released by the Institute for Information Industry, Bahamut ranked third among Taiwanese social networking websites. By October 2016, registered membership had reached 2.4 million users, with a cumulative login count of 736.98 million. In 2019, its annual revenue was approximately NT$200 million, and registered users increased to 2.5 million, up by around 40,000 per year. By 2022, revenue had increased to approximately NT$300 million, with around 1.5 million daily active users and up to 25 million daily page views. In the December 2024 SimilarWeb Taiwan rankings, Bahamut ranked 5th overall and first among gaming-related websites. In March 2025, membership exceeded 6 million, placing it among the top five most visited websites in Taiwan. As of late May 2026, total registered users had reached 6.71 million, surpassing the combined population of the Taipei and New Taipei metropolitan areas (6.47 million). User-generated content exceeded 13.7 million posts, while total page views reached 132.6 billion. Approximately 70% of traffic originated from Taiwan, Hong Kong, and Macau, while the remaining 30% came from regions including Japan, Malaysia, Mainland China, the United States, and Australia.

A 2009 academic study on the Bahamut community found that the platform’s management adopted a semi-decentralized governance model, granting subforums a degree of autonomy. The study also noted that the central administration focused on identifying market trends, setting long-term development directions, and continuously improving interface design and platform functionality. It further emphasized that Bahamut’s founders were themselves anime and video game enthusiasts, enabling them to better understand market dynamics and drive sustained growth.

Former vice president Chen Jianren stated that Bahamut is primarily driven by user-generated content, and therefore, fostering a sense of belonging and an open, free environment for ACG subculture enthusiasts is essential.

Although Bahamut is primarily a video game-related community website, it also hosts a wide range of discussion forums, including light novels, computer applications, and collectibles, attracting users with diverse interests. Academic research has utilized Bahamut’s high traffic volume as a data source for various studies. Psychological research on Taiwanese university students found that while Bahamut is primarily used for entertainment and social interaction, usage motivation varies by gender (higher among males), academic year (higher among senior students), and field of study. Overall usage motivation—especially emotional regulation and loneliness—showed a positive correlation, suggesting that heavier reliance on the platform is associated with increased loneliness as users compensate for real-world social dissatisfaction.

== Community culture ==
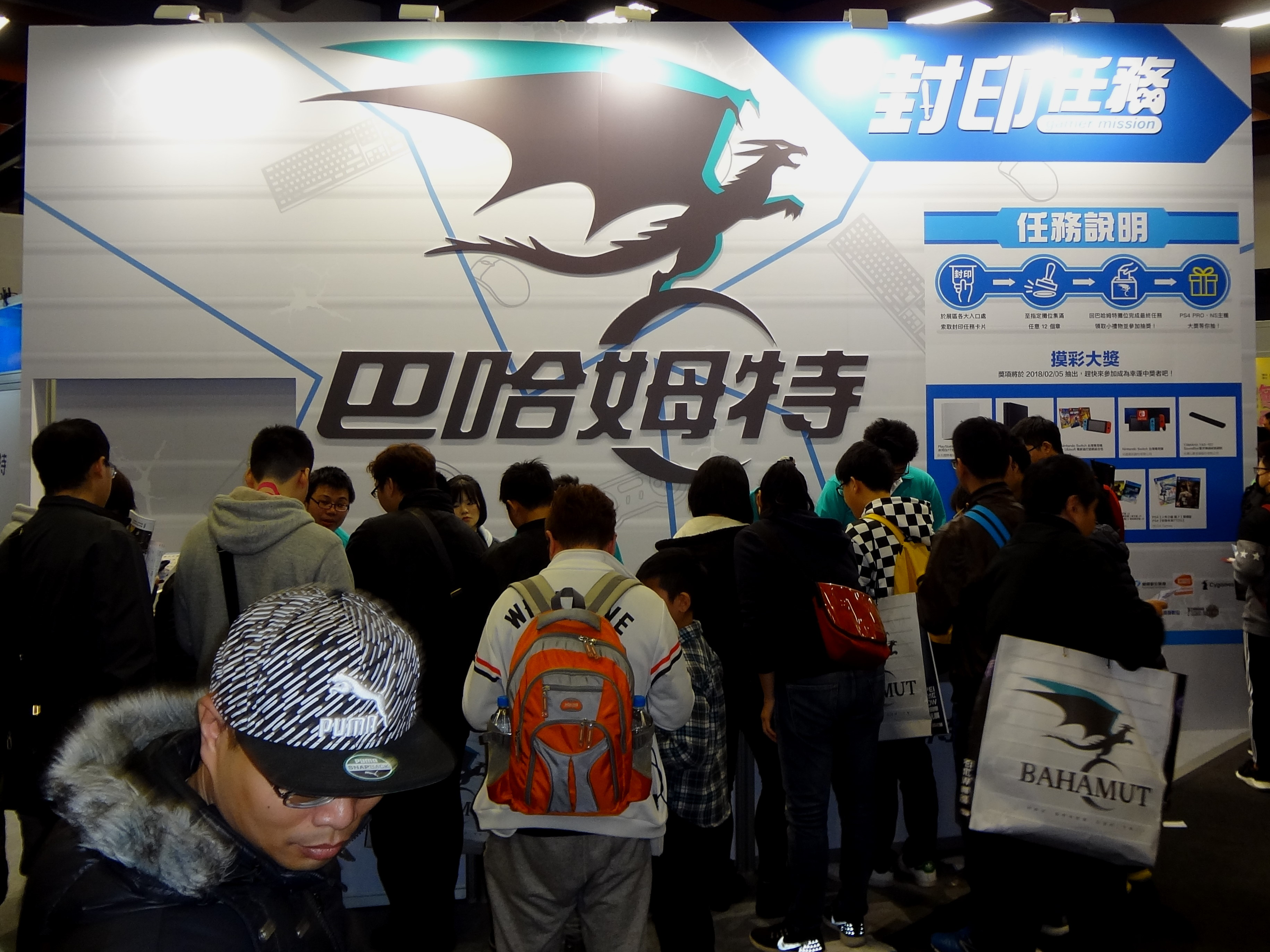
Bahamut booth at the 2018 Taipei Game Show

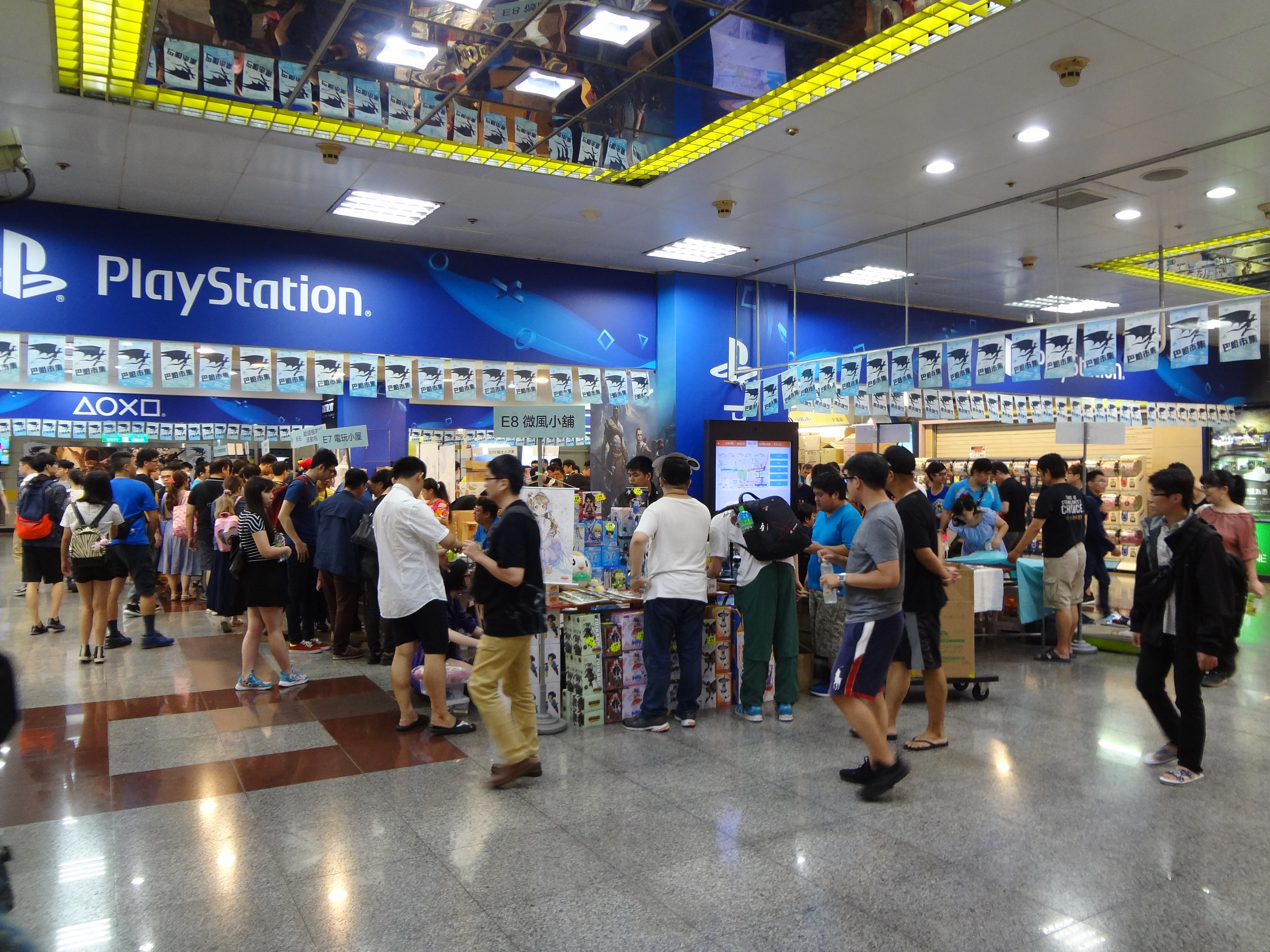
The 2018 Bahamut Market at Taipei City Mall

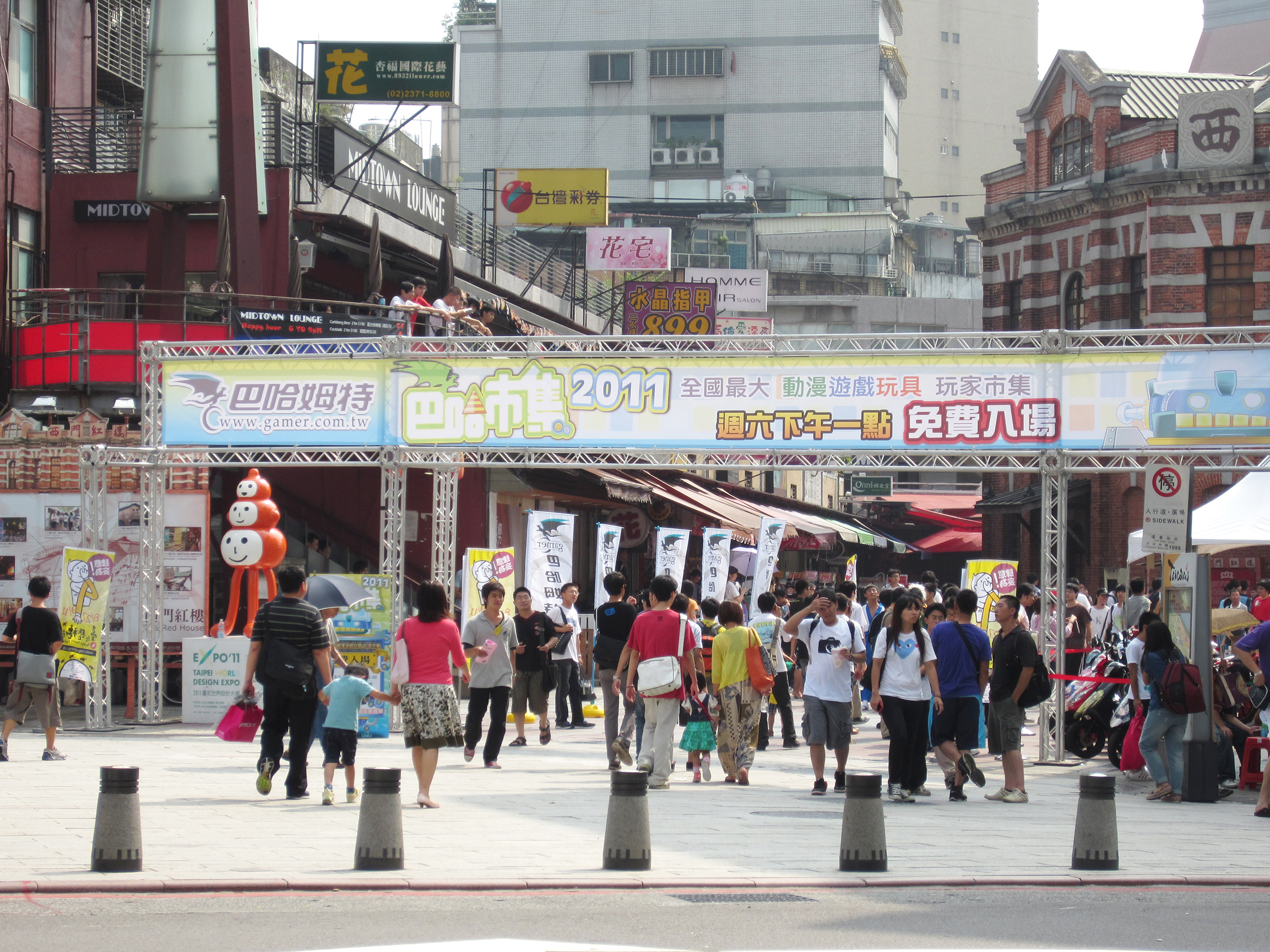
The 2011 Bahamut Market at Red House Theater

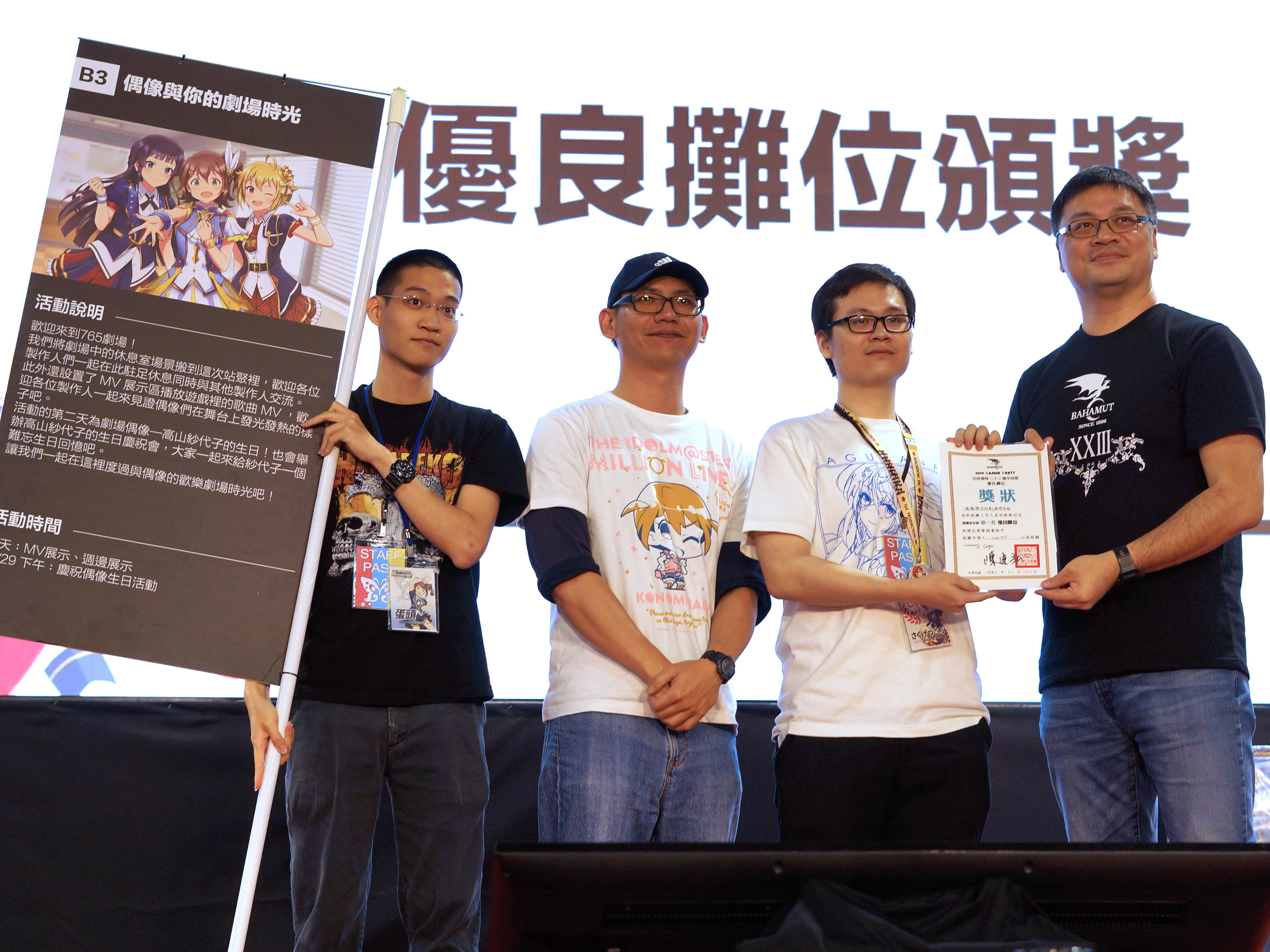
Award ceremony for outstanding booths at the 23rd anniversary gathering in 2019

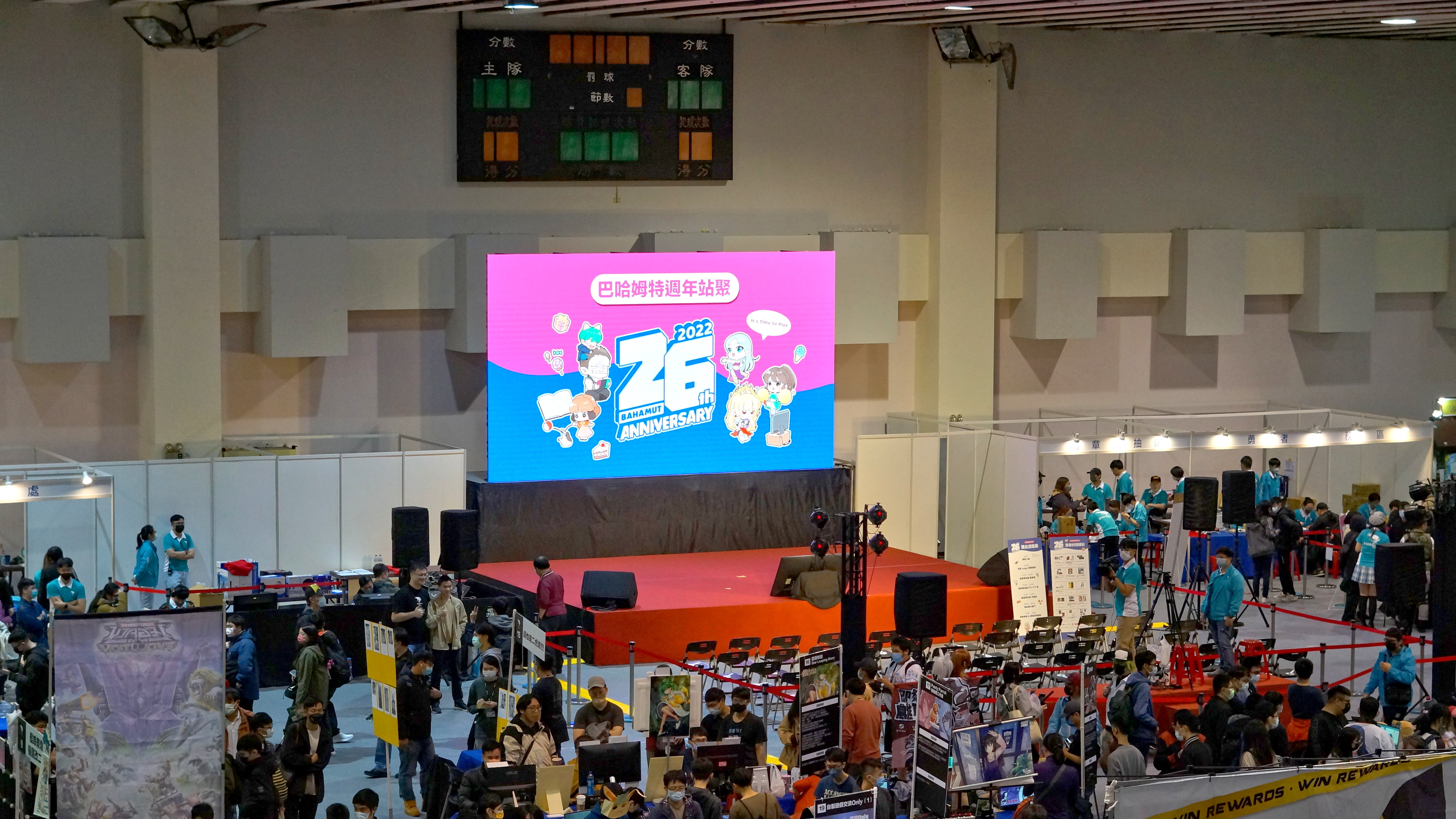
The 26th anniversary gathering in 2022 at the National Taiwan University Sports Center

The initial focus of the Bahamut Gamer Information Station was as a video game discussion forum. However, due to limited internet penetration in Taiwan at the time, most early users were university students, resulting in a relatively homogeneous user base. As a result, the earliest “gatherings” (known as station meets) were small private meetups between users and forum moderators. Starting in October 2000, the platform began organizing official gatherings and market events. A flea market event originally held during the fourth anniversary gathering, known as the “Pomo Festival,” became an independent event in 2001. It included both a flea market and auction activities. In July 2008, it was renamed the “Bahamut Market,” focusing on second-hand trading of anime, games, and toys, as well as creative goods from fan-made and doujin culture. Due to its popularity, the event has been held annually since then, with the number of booths exceeding 600.

=== List of annual events ===
==== Station gatherings ====
Name	Date	Venue	Ref
Bahamut 4th Anniversary Gathering	2000-10-28	National Taiwan Normal University Main Building	
Bahamut 5th Anniversary Gathering	2002-02-03	National Taipei University Minsheng Campus Gymnasium	
Bahamut 6th Anniversary Gathering	2003-01-26	National Taipei University Minsheng Campus Gymnasium	
Bahamut 7th Anniversary Gathering	2004-01-17	National Taiwan Normal University Sports Ground	
Bahamut 8th Anniversary Gathering	2005-01-29	National Taiwan University Sports Center	
Bahamut 9th Anniversary Gathering	2006-01-21	National Taiwan University Sports Center	
Bahamut 10th Anniversary Gathering	2006-12-02	National Taiwan University Sports Center	
Bahamut 11th Anniversary Gathering	2007-12-29	National Taiwan University Sports Center	
Bahamut 12th Anniversary Gathering	2008-12-13	National Taiwan University Sports Center	
Bahamut 13th Anniversary Gathering	2009-12-19	Huashan 1914 Creative Park	
Bahamut 14th Anniversary Gathering	2010-12-25	National Taiwan University Sports Center	
Bahamut 15th Anniversary Gathering	2011-12-17	National Taiwan University Sports Center	
Bahamut 16th Anniversary Gathering	2012-12-08	National Taiwan University Sports Center	
Bahamut 17th Anniversary Gathering	2013-12-21	National Taiwan University Sports Center	
Bahamut 18th Anniversary Gathering	2014-11-30	National Taiwan University Sports Center	
Bahamut 19th Anniversary Gathering	2015-12-19	National Taiwan University Sports Center	
Bahamut 20th Anniversary Gathering	2016-12-18	National Taiwan University Sports Center	
Bahamut 21st Anniversary Gathering	2017-12-16	National Taiwan University Sports Center	
Bahamut 22nd Anniversary Gathering	2018-12-15–16	Taipei Expo Park Expo Dome	
Bahamut 23rd Anniversary Gathering	2019-12-28–29	Taipei Expo Park Expo Dome	
Bahamut 24th Anniversary Gathering	2020-12-28–29	Online live broadcast	
Bahamut 25th Anniversary Gathering	2021-12-18	Online live broadcast	
Bahamut 26th Anniversary Gathering	2022-12-10	National Taiwan University Sports Center	
Bahamut 27th Anniversary Gathering	2023-11-11	Taipei Expo Park Expo Dome	
Bahamut 28th Anniversary Gathering	2024-11-09–10	Taipei Expo Park Expo Dome	
Bahamut 29th Anniversary Gathering	2025-12-27	Taipei Expo Park Expo Dome	
Bahamut 30th Anniversary Gathering	2026-10-24–25	Taipei Expo Park Expo Dome	

==== Markets ====
Name (Note: Only independently held market events are listed; events included within anniversary gatherings are excluded.)	Date	Venue	Ref
1st Pomo Festival	2001-01-28	Taipei City Mall Y District	
2nd Pomo Festival	2002-07-13	Taipei City Mall Y District	
3rd Pomo Festival	2003-08-22–26	Taipei World Trade Center Hall 1	
Bahamut Market (2008–2011 series)	2008-07-19	Ximending Ximen Red House Plaza	
2009 Bahamut Market	2009-07-18	Ximending Ximen Red House Plaza	
2010 Bahamut Market	2010-07-17	Ximending Ximen Red House Plaza	
2011 Bahamut Market	2011-09-03	Ximending Ximen Red House Plaza	
2012 Bahamut Market	2012-08-04	Taipei City Mall Y District	
2013 Bahamut Market	2013-08-03	Taipei City Mall Y District	
2014 Bahamut Market	2014-07-26	Taipei City Mall Y District	
2015 Bahamut Market	2015-07-25	Taipei City Mall Y District	
2016 Bahamut Market	2016-07-02	Taipei City Mall Y District	
2017 Bahamut Market	2017-07-08	Taipei City Mall Y District	
2018 Bahamut Market	2018-07-07–08	Taipei City Mall Y District	
2019 Bahamut Market	2019-07-06–07	Taipei City Mall Y District	
2020 Bahamut Market	~~2020-08-08–09~~ Cancelled due to the COVID-19 pandemic	Taipei City Mall Y District	
2021 Bahamut Market	~~2021-08 (early August)~~ Cancelled due to the COVID-19 pandemic	Taipei City Mall Y District	
2022 Bahamut Market	2022-07-09–10	Taipei City Mall Y District	
2023 Bahamut Market	2023-07-08–09	Taipei City Mall Y District	
2024 Bahamut Market	2024-07-13–14	Taipei City Mall Y District	
2025 Bahamut Market	2025-07-05–06	Taipei City Mall Y District	
2026 Bahamut Market	2026-07-04–05	Taipei City Mall Y District	

== Incidents and controversies ==
On April 27, 2008, at 22:00, Bahamut and Gamebase were subjected to a Distributed Denial-of-Service (DDoS) attack allegedly carried out by private server operators based in mainland China. The attackers reportedly demanded that the platforms allow free advertising for private servers of ‘’World of Warcraft‘’. After the operators refused the extortion demand, the attacks continued intermittently. The incident was reported to the police, and both the technical team and Internet service providers worked to mitigate the attack. In October 2020, police dismantled a pedophile-related online group. A man with the username “CIA Bear Head Director” (surname Lin) was found to have used the Bahamut platform to recruit users into a private LINE group where child sexual exploitation material was distributed. He was arrested following the investigation. In March 2021, following the Shuguang High School sexual assault case, the “Off-topic Discussion Board” section of Bahamut contained a large number of posts violating the Protection of Children and Youths Welfare and Rights Act. The Nantou County Government fined the platform NT$60,000 under Article 46, Paragraph 3 of the Act. On March 23, Bahamut announced that all illegal content would be removed immediately. In June 2021, users in the off-topic forum circulated false information regarding Japan’s foreign minister, leading to a criminal referral to the Taipei District Prosecutors' Office. However, the court ruled in July 2021 that the case was non-punishable. On August 18, 2022, during the third public hearing on the proposed “Digital Intermediary Services Act” held by Taiwan’s National Communications Commission (NCC), Bahamut vice president Chen Jian-Ren stated that, as a native social platform, the proposed regulations created practical compliance difficulties regarding freedom of speech. Operators of platforms including PTT, Dcard, and Mobile01 also expressed concerns that the proposal would be difficult to implement in practice. Following the hearing, the NCC stated that it would continue revising the draft based on stakeholder feedback. On November 11, 2023, during Bahamut’s 27th Anniversary Gathering held at the Taipei Expo Park Expo Dome, merchandise vendor “Ark Toy” reported that a limited-edition Godzilla figurine priced at NT$5,500 was stolen from its booth. Other vendors also reported missing CDs, figurines, and display items. Police were called to the scene and identified a suspect, with investigations continuing to recover the stolen goods.

== See also ==
- Gamebase
- 4Gamers
- 4Gamer.net
- Game Times
