= Poole's multiple sequence model =

Model of communication

Poole's multiple sequence model is a communication theory approach developed by Marshall Scott Poole in 1983. The model focuses on decision-making processes in groups, and rejects other widely held communication theories in favor of less linear decision-making processes. The multiple-sequence model suggests that group activity needs a changing development of communication. This model has three specific parts: developing strands, emphasison task accomplishment, and tracks of group activity

== Overview ==
Poole's multiple sequence model states that different groups make decisions through the applications of different sequences. This model rejects the idea that decision making occurs in separate, succinct phases, as other rational phase models suggest. Rather, Poole theorized that decision making occurs in clusters of linking communication. The multiple sequence model defines different contingency variables such as group composition, task structure, and conflict management approaches, which all affect group decision-making. This model consists of 36 clusters for coding group communication and four cluster-sets, such as proposal growth, conflict, socio-emotional interests, and expressions of uncertainty. By coding group decision-making processes, Poole identified a set of decision paths that are usually used by groups during decision-making processes.

This theory also consists of various tracks that define different stages of interpersonal communication, problem solving, and decision making that occur in group communication. These tracks are the task track, relation track, and topic track. The task track begins with an understanding period. This is when a group decides how they will solve a problem. The relation track focuses on interpersonal relationships between group members. This track suggests that as group members spend more time together, they will form deeper relationships which aid in group communication. The topic track focuses on issues that may arise among groups which affect group communication. Task is defined in two dimensions: difficulty, which is the amount of effort required to complete the task, and coordination requirements, which is the degree to which integrated action of group members is required to complete the task. In addition to these tracks, the multiple sequence model also contains break points, which are the points within group communication at which groups shift from one task to another. Identifying breakpoints allows the researcher to identify critical incidents or turning points in group activity.

=== Development ===
The development of the multiple sequence model stemmed from Poole finding stage models to be too linear based on systematized logic. Poole believed that decisions are based on many different activities and communication, this differing from the previous stage models other theorists were following. Poole's research and development of this model came from researching why the phasic model did not work. He looked at three tracks of group activity, many different breakpoints that signify changes in the development, and a model for task accomplishment.
