= Priyani =

Priyani is a given name. Notable people with the name include:

- Priyani Jayasinghe (1967–2018), Sri Lankan singer
- Priyani Puketapu (born 1990), New Zealand journalist
- Priyani Soysa (1925–2023), Sri Lankan scientist
- Priyani Wijesekera, Sri Lankan lawyer
