= Squicciarini =

Squicciarini is an Italian surname. Notable people with the name include:

- Andrew Squicciarini, documentary film editor of 16 Days of Glory
- Anna Squicciarini, Italian and American computer scientist
- Donato Squicciarini (1927–2006), Italian Catholic archbishop and nuncio
