= GDQ (disambiguation) =

Games Done Quick is a biannual speedrunning convention.

GDQ or variations may also refer to:

- GDQ, the IATA code for Gondar Airport, Ethiopia
- gdq, the ISO 639-3 code for Mehri language, Yemen, Oman and Saudi Arabia
- GDQ, (the Group Development Questionnaire) is a research-based survey based on Susan Wheelan’s model known as the Integrated Model of Group Development (IMGD).
