= Bahamut Animation Crazy =

Taiwanese video streaming service

- Website type: Over-the-top media service
- Available in: Traditional Chinese
- Headquarters: 15F, No. 420, Fuxing North Road, Zhongshan District, Taipei, Taiwan
- Area served: Taiwan, Penghu, Kinmen, Matsu, Hong Kong, Macau
- Owner: Oneup Network Corporation
- Creator: Chen Chien-hung
- Advertising: Advertisements are shown before playback for guest users and non-paying subscribers.
- Commercial: Yes
- Launched: January 6, 2016; 10 years ago
- Current status: Active
- Written in: JavaScript, CSS, HTML5

Bahamut Anime Crazy, abbreviated as Anime Crazy, is a Taiwanese OTT streaming platform jointly established by Bahamut Gamer's Community and Muse Communication on January 6, 2016. The platform mainly provides anime and tokusatsu works, and uses Chunghwa Telecom’s video streaming services. It aims to achieve near-simultaneous broadcasting with Japan’s currently airing seasonal anime. Users can watch content through desktop browsers and mobile apps, and the platform also provides a danmaku bullet-comment function that allows users to post comments during video playback.

Anime Crazy ranked first among video streaming websites in Taiwan from October to December 2023. In 2024, it ranked first among Taiwan’s local streaming platforms in terms of user preference. Its paid subscription rate grew from less than 0.5% at the beginning of the platform’s operation to 23.33% in January 2026. As of January 6, 2026, the platform had offered more than 2,500 works, with total video views exceeding 2.5 billion.

== History ==
=== Establishment ===
Founder Chen Chien-hung initially planned for the platform to focus on free access, 1080p video quality, Traditional Chinese characters subtitles, and updates within 12 hours of the Japanese broadcast schedule. The business model was intended to rely on advertising revenue, but this model was rejected by the Japanese side and was later changed to a paid model.

In 2014, AppWorks founder Jamie Lin invited several Taiwanese companies to visit internet companies in Silicon Valley, United States. At the time, Chen Chien-hung prepared a presentation on Taiwan’s situation when visiting an anime OTT company. For this purpose, he temporarily asked colleagues to conduct a survey on Bahamut Game's Community about users’ willingness to pay for anime. In the online survey, more than 70% of respondents said they were willing to pay to watch licensed anime and tokusatsu works on an online platform. As a result, Bahamut began evaluating the feasibility of an online anime streaming platform and used the data to seek partners. With the support of the owner of Taiwanese anime distributor Muse Communication, Bahamut cooperated with the company in 2016 to establish Anime Crazy.

Anime Crazy had a difficult early period, with both traffic and paid subscriptions remaining low. At the time, the paid subscription rate was below 0.5%. In October 2018, the platform adjusted its policy so that only paid users could watch videos in 1080p quality. In January 2020, several popular anime titles were released, and the COVID-19 pandemic led to an extended winter break in Taiwan, causing the paid subscription rate to rise to 5.12%. In 2023, the paid subscription rate reached 11%. Chen Chien-hung believed that, apart from Anime Crazy’s rich content supply and high-quality service, another reason was that people who had previously watched pirated anime now had economic ability and chose to support licensed services, treating the fee as a kind of “redemption ticket”. The platform’s future goal is to become the “anime version of Netflix”.

=== Timeline ===
On January 6, 2016, Anime Crazy officially launched its service. On January 25, it removed the restriction that members had to be registered for three months before watching videos, and added a paid ad-free plan. On May 11, it officially launched its mobile app version. In April 2017, the platform announced the paid user ratio among non-repeated viewers within 30 days.

On February 7, 2018, the desktop version added a custom danmaku keyword-filtering function. The mobile app version added the same feature on March 4. On September 19, the Android TV version was launched. On October 8, due to the increase in users and in order to maintain viewing quality, 1080p quality, which had previously been available for free to registered members, became a paid service. On December 21, the Apple TV version was launched.

On April 29, 2019, in order to maintain a suitable browsing environment for children and teenagers, restricted works were required to be viewed only after logging in. On January 16, 2020, due to controversy over the broadcast content of Interspecies Reviewers, Anime Crazy added an age-verification mechanism. Users who completed transactions by credit card payment, iOS payment, LINE Pay linked to a credit card, or Chunghwa Telecom mobile billing were considered verified and could watch uncensored anime.

On November 28, 2023, Anime Crazy announced that the “Anime Party” function would enter permanent open testing. Starting a party was limited to paid users, while joining a party was not restricted. On December 27, the platform announced that the mobile and tablet app versions could join Anime Party links that had already been opened.

In early May 2024, the official Facebook fan page of Bahamut Anime Crazy HK was established. On May 14, the platform announced that it planned to expand its licensing territory and begin service testing in Hong Kong and Macau in June. On June 3, the service officially launched. On July 22, Anime Crazy announced that Anime Party would support hosts embedding their own Twitch or YouTube livestreams into parties.

Anime Crazy held its first offline event at the Bahamut Market from July 5 to 6, 2025. At its booth, the platform sold “30-day membership physical serial number cards” and offered an interactive lucky draw for purchasers.

== Services and features ==
Anime Crazy uses Chunghwa Telecom’s video streaming services. Its licensing territory is limited to Taiwan, Penghu, Kinmen, the Matsu Islands, Hong Kong, and Macau. The platform offers two types of viewing plans: free viewing with advertisements and paid viewing without advertisements. Unregistered visitors can only watch videos in 360p quality. Registered users can access 540p and 720p quality, while Premium users can watch in 1080p video quality and 320Kbps audio quality. Some works are available only to paid users. Users who have completed age verification can watch uncensored or partially censored works.

The platform can be accessed through desktop web browsers, as well as Android and iOS apps. It also supports Android TV and Apple TV apps. Paid plans include regular no-ad plans for 30 days, 90 days, 180 days, and 360 days, as well as occasional promotional plans for 210 days and 390 days. If the website experiences an abnormal malfunction that affects paid members’ rights, the platform usually compensates users by extending the validity period of their paid membership according to the duration of the malfunction.

The platform’s danmaku bullet-comment function can be turned on or off by users. To make it easier to find works, Anime Crazy also provides genre filtering. The genres are divided into 15 categories: fantasy adventure, science fiction and future, youth and school, comedy, romance, heartwarming, supernatural and monsters, mystery and suspense, cooking and food, social realism, sports and competition, history and biography, others, movie versions, and OVAs.

Anime Crazy also launched an “Anime Party” function, allowing viewers to watch content online together with livestream hosts and interact in real time. In addition, enthusiastic users developed the unofficial Google Chrome extension and Greasy Fork user script “Anime Crazy Plus”. Its main functions include automatic consent to rating notices, automatic switching to the next episode after playback ends, video jump coordinates, picture-in-picture display of danmaku comments, video screenshots and recording, and right-click selection of danmaku comments.

== Licensing partners ==
At the beginning of Anime Crazy’s establishment, its licensing partner was Muse Communication. In the following year, companies such as Top-Insight International, Proware Multimedia International, and Mighty Media gradually joined the platform. At present, the anime channel category on the official website lists anime or tokusatsu works from licensing partners such as Medialink Group, Tong Li Creative, Kadokawa Corporation, JY Animation, Aniplus, Return Line Entertainment, Mighty International Pictures, Tien Media, GaragePlay, Pili International Multimedia, and REMOW .

Anime Crazy adopts a revenue-sharing system for acquiring titles. This avoids the risk of spending large amounts of money to purchase anime copyrights and suffering losses if viewership is poor. All programs are provided and authorized for broadcast by partner distributors. The platform’s service in Hong Kong and Macau officially launched on June 3, 2024. The first-stage partners included Muse Communication, Medialink Group, Mighty Media, Aniplus, Return Line Entertainment, and Tien Media. Due to differences in licensing regions and review procedures, related works and programs would be opened for viewing rights in batches.

== Reception ==
The main difference between Anime Crazy and other Taiwanese streaming platforms at the time was that it was “completely free.” As long as users were Bahamut members who had been registered for at least three months, they could watch all anime and tokusatsu works for free after watching the opening advertisement. Users who did not want to watch advertisements could choose the paid “ad-free plan.”

During video playback, the platform allows users to post danmaku-style reply messages, similar to Niconico, AcFun, and bilibili. Anime Crazy can therefore be regarded as a Taiwanese danmaku website, and it is also the only online anime platform in Taiwan that provides a danmaku function. Bahamut deputy CEO Chen Chien-jen pointed out that Anime Crazy continues Bahamut’s user-generated content characteristics, saying that “on Anime Crazy, many people specifically come to watch the danmaku.” For ACG fans, they not only enjoy the content itself, but also enjoy the feeling of interacting with others.

According to a survey by the Market Intelligence & Consulting Institute of the Institute for Information Industry, Anime Crazy ranked fifth among video streaming platforms popular among Taiwanese users in 2021. In a 2023 survey by the Taiwan Creative Content Agency, Anime Crazy ranked sixth among Taiwan’s local platforms in usage rate, while its paid subscription rate also continued to grow steadily. In 2024, Anime Crazy ranked first in Taiwanese viewers’ preference ranking for local streaming platforms, and ranked second in subscription services.

From October to December 2023, Anime Crazy’s global visits exceeded 48 million, making it the top-ranked video streaming website in Taiwan. This figure was 3.5 times higher than that of Line TV, which ranked second. Its paid subscription rate grew from 5% in early 2020 to 13% in 2023. According to data from the statistics website “illya.tw,” Anime Crazy’s paid subscription rate rose from its lowest point of 0.7% in August 2018 to a record high of 13.47% in early 2024, representing an increase of nearly 20 times. By early 2026, the rate had further risen to 23.33%.

As of January 6, 2026, the tenth anniversary of its establishment, Anime Crazy’s accumulated viewing time had exceeded 610 million hours. The platform had offered more than 2,500 works, with total video views reaching 2.5 billion.

Anime Crazy has generally received positive reviews for providing Taiwanese viewers with a convenient way to watch licensed Japanese seasonal anime and tokusatsu works. Since non-paid members can watch advertisements and then view current seasonal anime for free, well-known Taiwanese YouTuber Sharon described Anime Crazy as the “Taiwanese version of Netflix”.

In January 2020, due to the explicit nature of the anime Interspecies Reviewers, Anime Crazy replaced the original uncensored source with an edited version. This caused some paid users to threaten refunds and boycotts. Anime Crazy responded to the controversy by introducing an age-verification mechanism and restoring the uncensored version. As a result, phrases such as “Bahamut is my big bro” often appeared in the comments under Anime Crazy announcements.

=== Comparisons with other Chinese-language anime streaming services ===
Anime Crazy’s videos mainly consist of anime. Compared with other streaming websites, its content types are relatively limited. For example, bilibili also offers Japanese serialized anime, television dramas, illustration-related content, music, dance, games, technology, and other types of videos.

In April 2021, authorities in mainland China required the National Radio and Television Administration to review all Japanese anime on video platforms before they could be broadcast, and only titles that had received approval registration numbers and passed review could be made available. This led to a sharp decrease in the number of Japanese anime titles on bilibili, with some works becoming unavailable. Under the policy of review before release, many anime fans in mainland China said they would use VPNs to switch to Anime Crazy.

Although Crunchyroll began supporting Chinese-language services and launched its Taiwan website on May 18, 2026 in order to compete in the Asian anime streaming market, compared with Anime Crazy, Taiwanese media reports that the quality of its Chinese translations left much to be desired.
