= Group development =

Type of development

The goal of most research on group development is to learn why and how small groups change over time. To quality of the output produced by a group, the type and frequency of its activities, its cohesiveness, the existence of group conflict.

A number of theoretical models have been developed to explain how certain groups change over time. Listed below are some of the most common models. In some cases, the type of group being considered influenced the model of group development proposed as in the case of therapy groups. In general, some of these models view group change as regular movement through a series of "stages", while others view them as "phases" that groups may or may not go through and which might occur at different points of a group's history. Attention to group development over time has been one of the differentiating factors between the study of ad hoc groups and the study of teams such as those commonly used in the workplace, the military, sports and many other contexts.

== Theories and models ==
In the early 1970s, Hill and Grunner reported that more than 100 theories of group development existed. Since then, other theories have emerged as well as attempts at contrasting and synthesizing them. As a result, a number of typologies of group change theories have been proposed. A typology advanced by George Smith (2001) based on the work of Mennecke and his colleagues (1992) classifies theories based on whether they perceive change to occur in a linear fashion, through cycles of activities, or through processes that combine both paths of change, or which are completely non-phasic. Other typologies are based on whether the primary forces promoting change and stability in a group are internal or external to the group. A third framework advanced by Andrew Van de Ven and Marshall Scott Poole (1995), differentiates theories based on four distinct "motors" for generating change. According to this framework, the following four types of group development models exist:

Life cycle models:	Describe the process of change as the unfolding of a prescribed and linear sequence of stages following a program that is prefigured at the beginning of the cycle (decided within the group or imposed on it).
Teleological models:	Describe change as a purposeful movement toward one or more goals, with adjustments based on feedback from the environment.
Dialectical models:	Describe change as emerging from conflict between opposing entities and eventual synthesis leading to the next cycle of conflict
Evolutionary models:	Describe change as emerging from a repeated cycle of variation, selection and retention and generally apply to change in a population rather than change within an entity over time.

Some theories allow for combinations and interactions among these four "motors". For example, Poole (see below) found in his empirical research that seemingly complex patterns of behavior in group decision-making result from the interplay of life-cycle and teleological motors.

An important observation made by McGrath and Tschan in 2004 regarding the different models of group development found in the literature is that different models might explain different aspects of the history of a group. On the one hand, some models treat the group as an entity and describe its stages of development as a functioning unit or "intact system" (p. 101). In this case, the models should be independent of the specific details of the task that the group is performing. On the other hand, some models might describe phases of the group's task performance and, because of this, tend to be very sensitive to the type of task that the group is engaged in (the "acting system", p. 101).

Below are descriptions of the central elements of some of the most common models of group development (See Smith, 2001 and Van de Ven & Poole, 1996 for a more complete list of theories and models).

=== Kurt Lewin's individual change process ===
The first systematic study of group development was carried out by Kurt Lewin, who introduced the term "group dynamics". His ideas about mutual, cross-level influence and quasi-stationary equilibria, although uncommon in the traditional empirical research on group development, have resurged recently. His early model of individual change, which has served as the basis of many models of group development, described change as a three-stage process: unfreezing, change, and freezing.

Unfreezing:	This phase involves overcoming inertia and dismantling the existing "mind set". Defense mechanisms have to be bypassed.
Change	In the second stage change occurs. This is typically a period of confusion and transition. One is aware that the old ways are being challenged but does not have a clear picture to replace them with yet.
Freezing	In the third stage the new mindset is crystallizing and one's comfort level is returning to previous levels. This is often misquoted as "refreezing".

=== Tuckman's Stages model ===
Bruce Tuckman reviewed about fifty studies of group development (including Bales' model) in the mid-sixties and synthesized their commonalities in one of the most frequently cited models of group development (Tuckman, 1965). Tuckman's model of group development describes four linear stages (forming, storming, norming, and performing) that a group will go through in its unitary sequence of decision making. A fifth stage (adjourning) was added in 1977 when a new set of studies were reviewed (Tuckman & Jensen, 1977).

Forming:	Group members learn about each other and the task at hand. Indicators of this stage might include: Unclear objectives, Uninvolvement, Uncommitted members, Confusion, Low morale, Hidden feelings, Poor listening, etc. A leadership strategy to help groups that are forming is to act as a "coordinator" by helping to "set the stage" (i.e., purposefully pick the team, facilitate group goals, and create a team shared mental model) (Manges et al., 2016).
Storming:	As group members continue to work, they will engage each other in arguments about the structure of the group which often are significantly emotional and illustrate a struggle for status in the group. These activities mark the storming phase: Lack of cohesion, Subjectivity, Hidden agendas, Conflicts, Confrontation, Volatility, Resentment, anger, Inconsistency, Failure. A leadership strategy to help groups that are storming is to act as a "coach" by helping to "resolve conflict and tension" (i.e., act as a resource, develop mutual trust, calm the work environment) (Manges et al., 2016).
Norming:	Group members establish implicit or explicit rules about how they will achieve their goal. They address the types of communication that will or will not help with the task. Indicators include: Questioning performance, Reviewing/clarifying objectives, Changing/confirming roles, Opening risky issues, Assertiveness, Listening, Testing new ground, Identifying strengths and weaknesses. A leadership strategy to help groups that are norming and performing is to "empower" to help the team "successfully implement and sustain projects" (i.e., allow for the transfer of leadership, seek feedback from staff, set time aside for planning and engaging the team) (Manges et al., 2016).
Performing:	Groups reach a conclusion and implement the solution to their issue. Indicators include: Creativity, Initiative, Flexibility, Open relationships, Pride, Concern for people, Learning, Confidence, High morale, Success, etc.
Adjourning:	As the group project ends, the group disbands in the adjournment phase. This phase was added when Tuckman and Jensen's updated their original review of the literature in 1977. During the adjourning stage, the leader should transition into a supporting role in order to expand the initiative (i.e., create future leadership opportunities for the group members) (Manges et al., 2016).

Each of the five stages in the Forming-storming-norming-performing-adjourning model proposed by Tuckman involves two aspects: interpersonal relationships and task behaviors. Such a distinction is similar to Bales' (1950) equilibrium model which states that a group continuously divides its attention between instrumental (task-related) and expressive (socioemotional) needs.

As Gersick (1988) has pointed out, some later models followed similar sequential patterns. Examples include: define the situation, develop new skills, develop appropriate roles, carry out the work (Hare, 1976); orientation, dissatisfaction, resolution, production, termination (LaCoursiere, 1980); and generate plans, ideas, and goals; choose & agree on alternatives, goals, and policies; resolve conflicts and develop norms; perform action tasks and maintain cohesion (McGrath, 1984).

=== Tubbs' systems model ===
Stewart Tubbs "systems" approach to studying small group interaction led him to the creation of a four-phase model of group development:

Orientation:	In this stage, group members get to know each other, they start to talk about the problem, and they examine the limitations and opportunities of the project.
Conflict:	Conflict is a necessary part of a group's development. Conflict allows the group to evaluate ideas and it helps the group conformity and groupthink
Consensus:	Conflict ends in the consensus stage, when group members compromise, select ideas, and agree on alternatives.
Closure	In this stage, the final result is announced and group members reaffirm their support of the decision.

=== Fisher's theory of decision emergence in groups ===
Fisher outlines four phases through which task groups tend to proceed when engaged in decision making. By observing the distribution of act-response pairs (a.k.a. "interacts") across different moments of the group process, Fisher noted how the interaction changed as the group decision was formulated and solidified. His method pays special attention to the "content" dimension of interactions by classifying statements in terms of how they respond to a decision proposal (e.g. agreement, disagreement, etc.).

Orientation:	During the orientation phase, group members get to know each other and they experience a primary tension: the awkward feeling people have before communication rules and expectations are established. Groups should take time to learn about each other and feel comfortable communicating around new people.
Conflict:	The conflict phase is marked by secondary tension, or tension surrounding the task at hand. Group members will disagree with each other and debate ideas. Here conflict is viewed as positive, because it helps the group achieve positive results.
Emergence:	In the emergence phase, the outcome of the group's task and its social structure become apparent. Group members soften their positions and undergo an attitudinal change that makes them less tenacious in defending their individual viewpoint.
Reinforcement:	In this stage, group members bolster their final decision by using supportive verbal and nonverbal communication.

Based on this categorization, Fisher created his "Decision Proposal Coding System" that identifies act-response pairs associated with each decision-making phase. He observed that the group decision-making process tended to be more cyclical and, in some cases, almost erratic. He hypothesized that the interpersonal demands of discussion require "breaks" from task work. In particular, Fisher observed that there are a number of contingencies that might explain some of the decision paths taken by some groups. For instance, in modifying proposals, groups tend to follow one of two patterns. If conflict is low, the group will reintroduce proposals in less abstract, more specific language. When conflict is higher, the group might not attempt to make a proposal more specific but, instead, because disagreement lies on the basic idea, the group introduces substitute proposals of the same level of abstraction as the original.

=== Poole's multiple-sequences model ===
Marshall Scott Poole's model suggests that different groups employ different sequences in making decisions. In contrast to unitary sequence models, the multiple sequences model addresses decision making as a function of several contingency variables: task structure, group composition, and conflict management strategies. Poole developed a descriptive system for studying multiple sequences, beyond the abstract action descriptions of previous studies. From Bales' Interaction Process Analysis System and Fisher's Decision Proposal Coding System, Poole proposes 36 clusters of group activities for coding group interactions and 4 cluster-sets: proposal development, socioemotional concerns, conflict, and expressions of ambiguity. However, in his latter work, Poole rejected phasic models of group development and proposed a model of continuously developing threads of activity. In essence, discussions are not characterized by blocks of phases, one after another, but by intertwining tracks of activity and interaction.

Poole suggests three activity tracks: task progress, relational, and topical focus. Interspersed with these are breakpoints, marking changes in the development of strands and links between them. Normal breakpoints pace the discussion with topic shifts and adjournments. Delays, another breakpoint, are holding patterns of recycling through information. Finally, disruptions break the discussion threads with conflict or task failure.

Task track:	The task track concerns the process by which the group accomplishes its goals, such as dealing doing problem analysis, designing solutions, etc.
Relation track:	The relation track deals with the interpersonal relationships between the group members. At times, the group may stop its work on the task and work instead on its relationships, share personal information or engage in joking.
Topic track:	The topic track includes a series of issues or concerns the group have over time
Breakpoints:	Breakpoints occur when a group switches from one track to another. Shifts in the conversation, adjournment, or postponement are examples of breakpoints.

=== McGrath's Time, Interaction, and Performance (TIP) theory ===
McGrath's (1991) work emphasized the notion that different teams might follow different developmental paths to reach the same outcome. He also suggested that teams engage in four modes of group activity: inception, technical problem solving, conflict resolution, and execution. According to this model, modes "are potential, not required, forms of activity" (p. 153) resulting in Modes I and IV (inception and execution) being involved in all group tasks and projects while Modes II (technical problem solving) and III (conflict resolution) may or may not be involved in any given group activity (Hare, 2003 uses the terms meaning, resources, integration, and goal attainment for these four modes).

McGrath further suggested that all team projects begin with Mode I (goal choice) and end with Mode IV (goal attainment) but that Modes II and III may or may not be needed depending on the task and the history of the group's activities. McGrath contended that for each identified function, groups can follow a variety of alternative "time-activity paths" in order to move from the initiation to the completion of a given function. Specifically, TIP theory states that there is a "default path" between two modes of activity which is "satisficing" or "least effort" path, and that such default path will "prevail unless conditions warrant some more complex path" (1991, p. 159).

Mode I: Inception	Inception and acceptance of a project (goal choice)
Mode II: Technical Problem Solving	Solution of technical issues (means choice)
Mode III: Conflict Resolution	Resolution of conflict, that is, of political issues (policy choice)
Mode IV: Execution	Execution of the performance requirements of the project (goal attainment)

This model also states that groups adopt these four modes with respect to each of three team functions: production, well-being, and member support. In this sense, groups are seen as "always acting in one of the four modes with respect to each of the three functions, but they are not necessarily engaged in the same mode for all functions, nor are they necessarily engaged in the same mode for a given function on different projects that may be concurrent" (McGrath, 1991, p. 153). The following table illustrates the relationship between modes and functions.

Functions
	Production	Well-being	Member Support
Mode I: Inception	Production Demand/ Opportunity	Interaction Demand/ Opportunity	Inclusion Demand/ Opportunity
Mode II: Problem Solving	Technical Problem Solving	Role Network Definition	Position/ Status Attainment
Mode III: Conflict Resolution	Policy Conflict Resolution	Power/ Payoff Distribution	Contribution/ Payoff Relationships
Mode IV: Execution	Performance	Interaction	Participation

(Adapted from Figure 1 in McGrath, 1991, p. 154)

=== Gersick's punctuated equilibrium model ===
Gersick's study of naturally occurring groups departs from the traditionally linear models of group development. Her punctuated equilibrium model (Gersick, 1988, 1989, 1991) suggests that groups develop through the sudden formation, maintenance, and sudden revision of a "framework for performance". This model describes the processes through which such frameworks are formed and revised and predicts both the timing of progress and when and how in their development groups are likely, or unlikely, to be influenced by their environments. The specific issues and activities that dominate groups' work are left unspecified in the model, since groups' historical paths are expected to vary. Her proposed model works in the following way.

Phase I	According to the model, a framework of behavioral patterns and assumptions through which a group approaches its project emerges in its first meeting, and the group stays with that framework through the first half of its life. Teams may show little visible progress during this time because members may be unable to perceive a use for the information they are generating until they revise the initial framework.
Midpoint	At their calendar midpoints, groups experience transitions – paradigmatic shifts in their approaches to their work – enabling them to capitalize on the gradual learning they have done and make significant advances. The transition is a powerful opportunity for a group to alter the course of its life midstream. But the transition must be used well, for once it is past a team is unlikely to alter its basic plans again.
Phase 2	A second period of inertial movement, takes its direction from plans crystallized during the transition. At completion, when a team makes a final effort to satisfy outside expectations, it experiences the positive and negative consequences of past choices.

=== Wheelan's integrated model of group development ===
Building on Tuckman's model and based on her own empirical research as well as the foundational work of Wilfred Bion, Susan Wheelan proposed a "unified" or "integrated" model of group development (Wheelan, 1990; Wheelan, 1994a). This model, although linear in a sense, takes the perspective that groups achieve maturity as they continue to work together rather than simply go through stages of activity. In this model, "early" stages of group development are associated with specific issues and patterns of talk such as those related to dependency, counter-dependency, and trust which precede the actual work conducted during the "more mature” stages of a group's life. The table below describes each one of these phases.

Stage I Dependency and Inclusion	The first stage of group development is characterized by significant member dependency on the designated leader, concerns about safety, and inclusion issues. In this stage, members rely on the leader and powerful group members to provide direction. Team members may engage in what has been called “pseudo-work,” such as exchanging stories about outside activities or other topics that are not relevant to group goals.
Stage II Counterdependency and Fight	In the second stage of group development members disagree among themselves about group goals and procedures. Conflict is an inevitable part of this process. The group's task at Stage 2 is to develop a unified set of goals, values, and operational procedures, and this task inevitably generates some conflict. Conflict also is necessary for the establishment of trust and a climate in which members feel free to disagree with each other.
Stage III Trust / Structure	If the group manages to work through the inevitable conflicts of Stage 2, member trust, commitment to the group, and willingness to cooperate increase. Communication becomes more open and task-oriented. This third stage of group development, referred to as the trust and structure stage, is characterized by more mature negotiations about roles, organization, and procedures. It is also a time in which members work to solidify positive working relationships with each other
Stage IV Work / Productivity	As its name implies, the fourth stage of group development is a time of intense team productivity and effectiveness. Having resolved many of the issues of the previous stages, the group can focus most of its energy on goal achievement and task accomplishment
Final	Groups that have a distinct ending point experience a fifth stage. Impending termination may cause disruption and conflict in some groups. In other groups, separation issues are addressed, and members' appreciation of each other and the group experience may be expressed.

Based on this model, Wheelan has created and validated both a Group Development Observation System (GDOS) and a Group Development Questionnaire (GDQ). The GDOS allows researchers to determine the developmental stage of a group by categorizing and counting each complete thought exhibited during a group session into one of eight categories: Dependency statements, Counterdependency, Fight, Flight, Pairing, Counterpairing, Work, or Unscorable statements (Wheelan, 1994). The GDQ is used to survey group members and assess their individual perception of their group's developmental state (Wheelan, S., & Hochberger, 1996). Her academic work has been transferred into a commercial organization, GDQ Associates, Inc.

In her empirical validation of the model, Wheelan (2003) has analyzed the relationship between the length of time that a group has been meeting and the verbal behavior patterns of its members as well as the member's perceptions of the state of development of the group. Her results seem to indicate that there is a significant relationship between the length of time that a group had been meeting and the verbal behavior patterns of its members. Also, members of older groups tended to perceive their groups to have more of the characteristics of Stage-3 and Stage-4 groups and to be more productive. Based on these results, Wheelan's position supports the traditional linear models of group development and casts doubt on the cyclic models and Gersick's punctuated equilibrium model.

=== Morgan, Salas and Glickman's TEAM model ===
Combining multiple theories and the development models of Tuckman and Gersick, Morgan, Salas and Glickman (1994) created the Team Evolution and Maturation (TEAM) model to describe a series of nine developmental stages through which newly formed, task-oriented teams are hypothesized to evolve. The periods of development are labeled "stages" and conceived to be "relatively informal, indistinct, and overlapping", because "sharp demarcations are not often characteristic of the dynamic situations in which operational teams work and develop". According to this model, teams might begin a given period of development at different stages and spend different amounts of time in the various stages. Teams are not always expected to progress in a linear fashion through all of the stages. A team's beginning point and pattern of progression through the stages depend on factors such as the characteristics of the team and team members, their histories and experience, the nature of their tasks, and the environmental demands and constraints (cf. McGrath, 1991).

The TEAM model identities a total of nine stages, seven central ones supplemented by two additional ones. The seven central stages begin with the formation of the team during its first meeting (forming) and moves through the members' initial, and sometimes unstable, exploration of the situation (storming), initial efforts toward accommodation and the formation and acceptance of roles (norming), performance leading toward occasional inefficient patterns of performance (performing-I), reevaluation and transition (reforming), refocusing of efforts to produce effective performance (performing-11), and completion of team assignments (conforming). The development of a team might be recycled from any of the final stages to an earlier stage if necessitated by a failure to achieve satisfactory performance or if adjustments to environmental demands are required or if problematic team interactions develop.

The core stages of the model are preceded by a pre-forming stage that recognizes the forces from the environment (environmental demands and constraints) that call for, and contribute to, the establishment of the team; that is, forces external to the team (before it comes into existence) that cause the team to be formed. The last stage indicates that after the team has served its purpose, it will eventually be disbanded or de-formed. Here, individuals exit from the group (separately or simultaneously) and the team loses its identity and ceases to exist.

The TEAM model also postulates the existence of two distinguishable activity tracks present throughout all the stages. The first of these tracks involves activities that are tied to the specific task(s) being performed. These activities include interactions of the team members with tools and machines, the technical aspects of the job (e.g., procedures, policies, etc.), and other task-related activities. The other track of activities is devoted to enhancing the quality of the interactions, interdependencies, relationships, affects, cooperation, and coordination of teams.

The proponents of the model did not test its components or sequence of stages empirically but did confirm that the perceptions of team members concerning the performance processes of the team are perceived to include both team-centered and task-centered activities and that these perceptions seem to change over time as a result of team training.

=== Hackman's Multilevel Perspective ===
Since its beginning, the study of group dynamics has caused disagreement between researchers, as some maintain the focus should be at the individual-level, and others maintain the focus should be at the group-level. The Multilevel Perspective is an integration of these analyses into one unified approach. It suggests that group development and success can be best understood by taking into account components found at all levels of analysis.

Group behavior can be broken down into 3 levels of analysis: the individual level (micro), the group level (meso) and the organizational or societal level (macro).

Micro-Level: Individual Level	Refers to the personal qualities and characteristics of individual group members, as well as their actions.
Meso-Level: Group Level	Refers to the qualities and characteristics of the group as a whole, such as how cohesive the group is, what is its size, how is it structured, etc.
Macro-Level: Organizational or Societal Level	Refers to the qualities, characteristics, and processes of the larger collectives of which a group is a part of (i.e., the organization or the community).

Hackman (2003) warns that the scientific community has a tendency towards what is termed, “explanatory reductionism” or the tendency to believe that the workings of all natures systems can be explained by the properties of the parts that make them up. In truth, highly complex systems, such as groups, can have components that cannot be explained by looking at the properties of say, the individual. In order to get a true understanding of group dynamics, it is important that one focuses on the big picture.

Hackman (2003) emphasizes this point via an example of his previous research on the effectiveness of airline cockpit crews. The study looked at 300 crews from various airlines located in the U.S., Europe, and Asia (Hackman, 1993). The crews varied based on success, and the current barriers they were facing, which included things such as economic difficulty and other external stressors.

At first, the analysis included structural features (design of the flying task and the crew itself) that were assessed using methods that included surveys, interviews, and reviews of training and procedure manuals. Once the data analysis began, a one-way analysis of variance showed that the airlines had nearly no variation on measures of crew structure and behavior. These results were quite contradictory to what had been expected, but fortunately, Hackman had also collected data on a number of individual and contextual factors, just in case. At the individual level, it appeared as though the airlines once again did not vary significantly, but at the organizational level the source of variance was found. It turned out that the variability in crew success was related to each crew's organizational context. A total of five key features were determinants of crew success: adequacy of material resources, clarity of performance objectives, recognition and reinforcement for excellent crew performance, availability of educational and technical assistance, and availability of informational resources. If the researchers had chosen to collect data at just one level of analysis (e.g. the group level) the study would not have produced significant results.

When studying group development and dynamics, it is important that all levels of analysis are taken into consideration. While it may be tempting to focus mainly at the group level, important information may be present either one level up (the organizational level) or one level down (the individual level).

=== Chaos Theory of Nonlinear Dynamics ===
Chaos Theory is a concept taken from the physical sciences. It challenges models that postulate linear and sequential processes, and instead suggests that development is inherently unpredictable. Chaos theory argues that it's unrealistic for a system to go through deterministic, predictable, and repeated stages. It was first applied to group development literature by McClure (1998) to suggest how groups never repeats themselves in the 'exact' same way, but that teams go through periods of chaos where the trajectory of the group is determined through conflict, turbulence, and uncertainty.

However, there is some order that is created out of chaos. When a system is prone to be resolved in a certain way, but is not determined by a certain trajectory or constrained by time then this system is said to have a strange attractor. For groups, working as a functioning, effective team serves as the strange attractor, because this is the state groups naturally wish to return to after a chaotic period.

This has been applied to research on hazing and initiation rituals to examine how the process of initiation for sport teams place the group in an unfamiliar state, to which group development is unpredictable, and can result in various outcomes dependent on the individual and the leadership of the team. Further, the influence of leadership within a chaotic system has been examined to ascertain how turbulent processes can be managed or guided towards successful outcomes.

== Further challenges ==
Apart from the question of the validity of the research methods used and the generalizations that can be made based on the types of groups studied, there still remain some significant challenges in the study of group development. As some researchers have pointed out (e.g. Tuckman, 1965) group development models often provide only snapshots of groups at certain points of their history but do not fully describe the mechanisms of change, the "triggers" that lead to change or the amount of time that a group might remain in a stage. Furthermore, naturally occurring groups tend to be highly sensitive to outside influences and environmental contingencies, but few models account for these influences.

Models of "small" group development are also related to those of organization development but operate at a different level of analysis. Despite their differences, both areas of work attempt to understand patterns and processes of collective change. Both fields should strive to develop "process-oriented" theories, which according to Poole and Van de Ven (2004):

- Provide a deep understanding of how change comes about by describing the generative mechanism that drives the process;
- Can account for path dependence and the role of critical events in change and innovation; and
- Can incorporate the role of human agency in change without reducing it to causal terms.

A number of questions still remain unanswered in the study of group development over time. As McGrath and Tschan (2004) stated, some of these challenges include:

- Do groups of all types change in the same way?
- Are the temporal patterns in groups in fact developmental stages with the changes patterned so that the same kinds of structures and processes occur in the same fixed sequences for all groups?
- If there is a fixed sequence of stages of development, are the stages of equal or different durations? Do all groups go through these stages at the same rate?
- Is the pattern of stages immutable or subject to alteration by unique circumstances or events external to the group?
- If a given group does not follow a fixed sequence of stages, is variation in the sequence indicative of malfunction in the group's development or maturation, or does it merely express normal variation arising from initial or contextual conditions? (p.102)

== See also ==
- Group dynamics
- Team work
- Team building
- Human Systems Intervention
