= Jaideep Srivastava =

Computer scientist

- Born: 1960 (age 65–66); Lucknow, India
- Citizenship: USA
- Education: Indian Institute of Technology Kanpur; University of California, Berkeley
- Scientific career
- Fields: Data Mining, Machine Learning
- Workplaces: University of Minnesota; Qatar Computing Research Institute
- Thesis: Performance Modeling of Distributed Databases (1988)
- Doctoral advisor: Chittoor V. Ramamoorthy
- Doctoral students: Yingshu Li; Ajay Bhushan Pandey; Duminda Wijesekera; Muhammad Aurangzeb Ahmad

Jaideep Srivastava is a professor of Computer Science at the University of Minnesota.

He is a Fellow of the Institute of Electrical and Electronics Engineers (IEEE) and was awarded the Distinguished Research Contributions Award of the PAKDD, for his lifetime contributions to the field of data mining. He is also Distinguished Fellow of Allina’s Center for Healthcare Innovation. Previously, he was the director of Social Computing group at QCRI. He has a Bachelor's of Technology from the Indian Institute of Technology (IIT) Kanpur in India. He has a Masters and PhD from the University of California, Berkeley. He was one of the principal investigators of the Virtual Worlds Observatory project along with Noshir Contractor, Marshall Scott Poole and Dmitri Williams. He received the IBM faculty award in 2002 and became an IEEE Fellow in 2004. In 2011 he co-founded Ninja Metrics with USC Professor Dmitri Williams and was assisted by Kyong Jin Shim, Nishith Pathak, Muhammad Aurangzeb Ahmad and Senthil Krishnamoorthy. In 2021, Guide2Research ranked him as one of the top 1,000 researchers in Computer Science. He was also the Data Mining Architect at Amazon during the early days (1999-2000) of the organization.
