= Kevin J. Dooley =

American scholar

Kevin John Dooley is an American scholar, and Professor of Supply Chain Management at the W. P. Carey School of Business at Arizona State University.

== Biography ==
Dooley studied at the University of Illinois, where he received his BS in industrial engineering in 1982, his MS in industrial engineering in 1984, and his PhD in mechanical engineering in 1987 for the thesis "A fault classification system for quality and productivity improvements in continuous processes" under supervision of Shiv G. Kapoor.

Dooley started his academic career at the University of Minnesota in 1987 as assistant professor of mechanical engineering, and from 1992 to 1997 he was an associate professor and also director of the industrial engineering program. In 1997 he became professor of management and professor of industrial engineering at Arizona State University and since 2003 has been a professor of supply chain management in the W.P. Carey School of Business, and senior sustainability scientist at the ASU School of Sustainability since 2010. He is co-director of the Center for the Complex Adaptive Supply Networks Research Accelerator (CASN-RA), a global group of researchers using complexity science to study supply networks. He has been president and is currently trustee of the Society for Chaos Theory in Psychology & Life Sciences. In 2022, he won the Distinguished Scholar Award from the Academy of Management's Operations & Supply Chain Management Division.

He was CEO of Crawdad Technologies, which created text analysis software from 2000 to 2008. In 2004, the New York Times cited their Mud Meter, which measured the negative-sentiment communications made by the Bush and Kerry presidential campaigns. In 2008, their Wonkosphere site used text analytics to track conservative and liberal blogs during the 2008 presidential campaign.

Since 2008, Dooley has been a part of and is currently chief scientist at The Sustainability Consortium. The Consortium is a multi-stakeholder organization managed by Arizona State University and University of Arkansas that works with brands and retailers to make consumer products more sustainable.

Dooley's research interests are in the field of the "application of complexity science to help organizations improve." His work includes applications to quality, innovation, organizational change, supply chain management, and sustainability.

Dooley is also an amateur photographer whose Creative Commons works on Flickr are used often in publications and books, including Wikipedia and Wikimedia. He has been recognized for his work using Google Street View images.

== Publications ==
=== Selected books ===
- Marshall Scott Poole, Andrew H. Van de Ven, Kevin Dooley, and Michael Holmes (2000) Organizational Change and Innovation Processes: Theory and Methods for Research. New York: Oxford University Press.
- Baumann, W., Fristch, J., and K. Dooley (2007). Network Maturity Model: An Integrated Process Framework for Computer Network Management. Parket, CO: Outskirts Press.

=== Selected articles ===
- Dooley, Kevin J. (1997). "A Complex Adaptive Systems Model of Organization Change". Nonlinear Dynamics, Psychology, and Life Sciences. 1 (1): 69–97. doi:10.1023/A:1022375910940. S2CID 61140681.
- Dooley, Kevin J.; Van de Ven, Andrew H. (June 1999). "Explaining Complex Organizational Dynamics". Organization Science. 10 (3): 358–372. doi:10.1287/orsc.10.3.358.
- Choi, Thomas Y; Dooley, Kevin J; Rungtusanatham, Manus (May 2001). "Supply networks and complex adaptive systems: control versus emergence". Journal of Operations Management. 19 (3): 351–366. doi:10.1016/S0272-6963(00)00068-1.
- Corman, Steven R.; Kuhn, Timothy; Mcphee, Robert D.; Dooley, Kevin J. (April 2002). "Studying Complex Discursive Systems". Human Communication Research. 28 (2): 157–206. doi:10.1111/j.1468-2958.2002.tb00802.x.
- Begun, James W; Zimmerman, Brenda; Dooley, Kevin J (2003). "Health Care Organizations as Complex Adaptive Systems". In Mick, Stephen S; Wyttenbach, Mindy E (eds.). Advances in Health Care Organization Theory. Jossey-Bass. pp. 253–288. ISBN 978-0-7879-5764-3. S2CID 20411773.
- Dooley, Kevin J. (January 2009). "The empiricism-modeling dichotomy in operations and supply management". Journal of Supply Chain Management. 45 (1): 38–43. doi:10.1111/j.1745-493X.2009.03154.x.
- Dooley, Kevin J. (6 June 2014). "The whole chain". Science. 344 (6188): 1108. Bibcode:2014Sci...344.1108D. doi:10.1126/science.1256025. PMID 24904153. S2CID 206559047.
