= Anna Squicciarini =

Computer scientist

Anna Cinzia Squicciarini
- Education: Computer Science Ph.D., 2006, University of Milan
- Occupation: Computer scientist

Anna Cinzia Squicciarini is a computer scientist specializing in computer security and data privacy, including research on sentiment analysis, computational trust, and cloud computing. She is Edward Frymoyer Endowed Chair in the Penn State College of Information Sciences and Technology, and a program director for Secure and Trustworthy Cyberspace at the National Science Foundation.

Squicciarini completed a Ph.D. in computer science in 2006, at the University of Milan. She joined Penn State in 2008 after postdoctoral research from 2006 to 2007 Purdue University, and was given the Frymoyer Endowed Chair there in 2022.

Squicciarini became a Fulbright Scholar in 2020, funding a research visit to King's College London. She was named NSF program director in 2022.
