= Chittoor V. Ramamoorthy =

Indian-American computer scientist

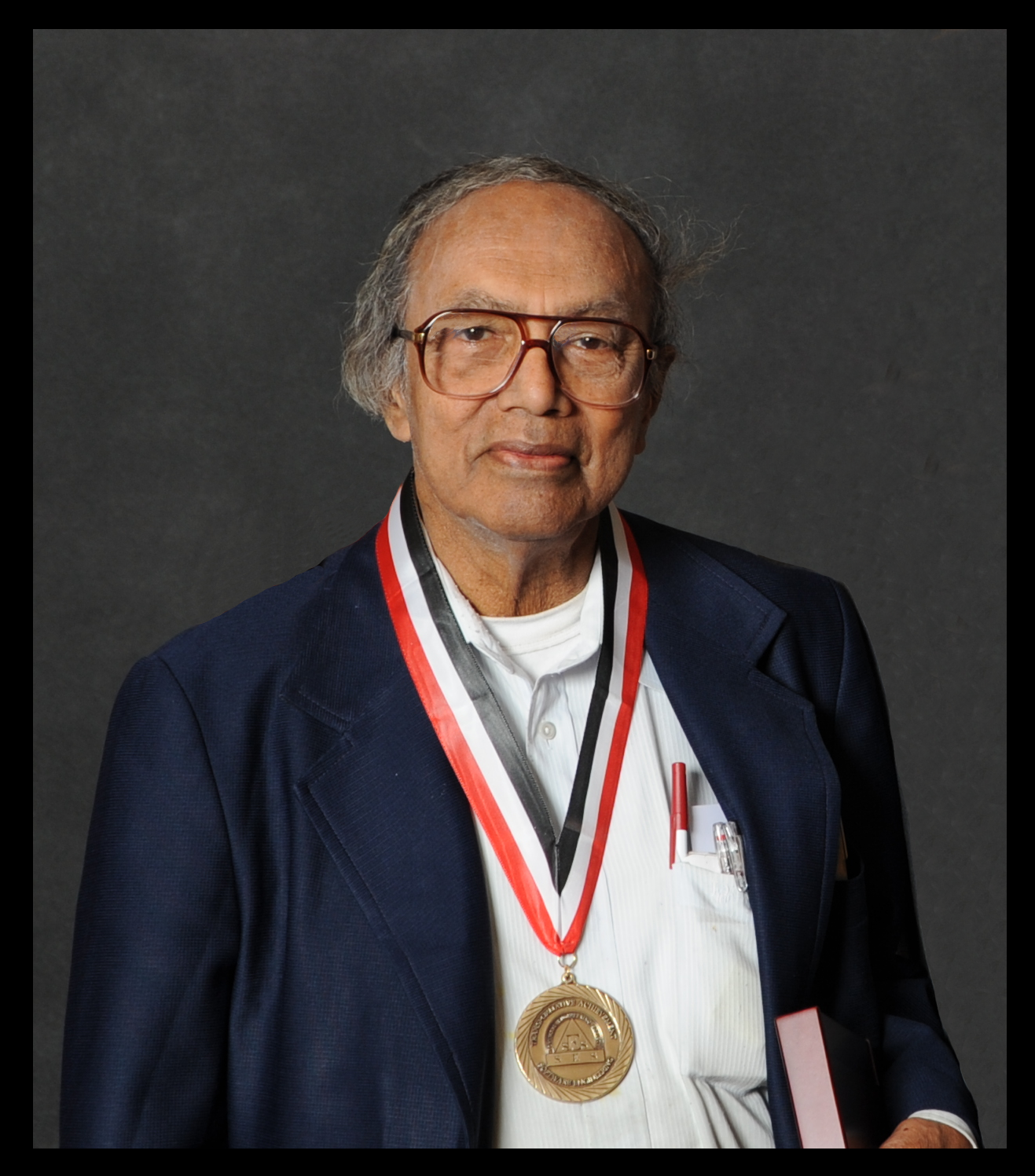
- Born: May 5, 1926; Rangoon, Burma
- Died: March 9, 2016 (aged 89); San Diego, California
- Education: University of Madras; Harvard University
- Known for: Software Engineering; Software Security; Distributed and Parallel Computing; Computer Architecture; Transdisciplinary Research
- Scientific career
- Fields: Computer Science
- Workplaces: University of California, Berkeley University of Texas at Austin
- Doctoral students: Jaideep Srivastava; Chen Wen-tsuen

Chittoor V. Ramamoorthy (May 5, 1926 – March 9, 2016) was an Indian-American computer scientist, computer engineer and educator whose work had many implications in engineering, computer science, and software engineering. Together with Raymond T. Yeh, he is given credit for the early establishment of the discipline of software engineering. He had a large following worldwide with whom he actively collaborated until the last few months of his life. Advances made during these collaborations included the exploration of transdisciplinary methods and the development of a science to support future complex systems design.

== Early life and education ==
Ramamoorthy was born in Burma to Indian parents and educated in India and the U.S. He studied physics and textile technology at the University of Madras, did graduate work in mechanical engineering at the University of California, Berkeley, and received both a Master's and Ph.D. in electrical engineering and applied mathematics from Harvard University in 1964.

== Career ==
He started his career at Honeywell in 1956. He later taught at the University of Texas at Austin and at the University of California, Berkeley in 1972. He also served on advisory committees for the U.S. Army, Air Force and Navy; Los Alamos Labs; Lockheed Research; and IBM.

In 1994, he retired from UC Berkeley and became professor emeritus after having mentored 73 Ph.D. students. He held the Control Data Distinguished Professorship at the University of Minnesota and the Grace Hopper Chair at the U.S. Naval Postgraduate School, Monterrey, California. He was a visiting professor at Northwestern University and visiting research professor at the University of Illinois, Urbana-Champaign. He served as the education chair of the American Federation of Information Processing Societies. He also held the honorary professorship at Asia University Taichung, Taiwan. He was the founding director of the International Institute of Systems Integration. Dr. Ramamoorthy served on several advisory committees of the U.S. Government and academia, including advisory committees of the U.S. Army (Advanced Strategic Missile Defense), the Air Force (Science Advisory Board), the Navy (Office of Naval Research), the Los Alamos National Labs, Lockheed Research, IBM Research, and the university systems of Florida, Texas, Missouri, California, and Toronto.

Ramamoorthy was a Life Fellow of the IEEE as well as editor-in-chief of the IEEE Transactions on the Knowledge and Data Engineering and IEEE Transactions on Software Engineering, He was the program chair of the first IEEE-ACM-International Conference of Software Engineering and co-founder of IEEE Symposium on Reliable Distributed systems (SRDS).

He helped start several organizations including the Society for Design and Process Science (SDPS) where he served as board chairman until his passing. He was both a founding member and fellow of SDPS.

== Personal life ==
Ramamoorthy was married for 58 years to his wife, Daulat. They had three children: Vijay, Sonia and Maya.

== Awards ==
In 1997 the C.V. Ramamoorthy Distinguished Research Award was created at the University of California, Berkeley for outstanding contributions to a new research area in computer science and engineering.

In 2006, SDPS created the Ramamoorthy-Yeh Endowment to support International transdisciplinary and transformative scientific research, education, and knowledge discrimination.

In 2006 the International IEEE Conference on Tools of Artificial Intelligence (ICTAI) has established "the CV Ramamoorthy Best Paper Award". Since then, this award is annually given to the best research paper of the ICTAI Conference.
