= Marshall Scott Poole =

American academic (born 1951)

Marshall Scott Poole (born 1951) is an American communication researcher and professor of communication at the University of Illinois at Urbana–Champaign.

== Biography ==
Poole received his BA in Communication Arts at the University of Wisconsin-Madison in 1973, his MA in Communication at the Michigan State University in 1976, and back at the University of Wisconsin-Madison his PhD in Communication Arts in 1980 with a minor in Management.

Poole started his academic career in 1979 as assistant professor in the Department of Speech Communication of the University of Illinois at Urbana-Champaign. In 1985 he moved to the University of Minnesota, where he started as assistant professor, became associate professor in 1987, and professor at the Department of Speech-Communication from 1991 to 1995. From 1989-1993 he was also adjunct professor at the Hubert H. Humphrey Institute of Public Policy of the University of Minnesota. In 1995 he moved to the Texas A&M University, where he was professor of communication from 1995 to 2006, and also professor of information and operations management from 2001 to 2006. In 2006 he returned to the University of Illinois at Urbana-Champaign as professor of communication and senior research scientist in the National Center for Supercomputing Applications. He was one of the principal investigators of the Virtual Worlds Observatory project along with Noshir Contractor, Jaideep Srivastava and Dmitri Williams.

== Publications ==
Poole authored and co-authored many publications. Books, a selection:

- Beck, Stephenson J., Joann Keyton, and Marshall Scott Poole, eds. The Emerald Handbook of Group and Team Communication Research. Emerald Group Publishing, 2021.
- Marshall Scott Poole, Andrew H. Van de Ven, Kevin Dooley, and Michael E. Holmes (2000) Organizational Change and Innovation Processes: Theory and Methods for Research. New York: Oxford University Press.
- Marshall Scott Poole and Andrew H. Van de Ven (eds.) (2004) Handbook of Organizational Change and Innovation. New York: Oxford University Press.

Articles, a selection:

- DeSanctis, Gerardine, and Marshall Scott Poole. "Capturing the complexity in advanced technology use: Adaptive structuration theory." Organization science 5.2 (1994): 121-147.
- Van de Ven, Andrew H., and Marshall Scott Poole. "Explaining development and change in organizations." Academy of management review 20.3 (1995): 510-540.
- Van de Ven, Andrew H., Harold L. Angle, and Marshall Scott Poole, eds. Research on the management of innovation: The Minnesota studies. New York: Oxford University Press, 2000.
- Muhammad Aurangzeb Ahmad, David Huffaker, Jing Wang, Jeff Treem, Marshall Scott Poole, and Jaideep Srivastava. "GTPA: A generative model for online mentor-apprentice networks." In Twenty-Fourth AAAI Conference on Artificial Intelligence. 2010.
- Schecter, Aaron, Andrew Pilny, Alice Leung, Marshall Scott Poole, and Noshir Contractor. "Step by step: Capturing the dynamics of work team process through relational event sequences." Journal of Organizational Behavior 39, no. 9 (2018): 1163-1181.
