= Computational trust =

Generation of trusted authorities or user trust through cryptography

In information security, computational trust is the generation of trusted authorities or user trust through cryptography. In centralised systems, security is typically based on the authenticated identity of external parties. Rigid authentication mechanisms, such as public key infrastructures (PKIs) or Kerberos, have allowed this model to be extended to distributed systems within a few closely collaborating domains or within a single administrative domain. During recent years, computer science has moved from centralised systems to distributed computing. This evolution has several implications for security models, policies and mechanisms needed to protect users’ information and resources in an increasingly interconnected computing infrastructure.

Identity-based security mechanisms cannot authorise an operation without authenticating the claiming entity. This means that no interaction can occur unless both parties are known by their authentication frameworks. Spontaneous interactions would, therefore, require a single, or a few trusted certificate authorities (CAs). In the present context, PKI has not been considered since they have issues, thus it is unlikely that they will establish themselves as a reference standard in the near future. A user who wishes to collaborate with another party can choose between enabling security and thereby disabling spontaneous collaboration, or disabling security and enabling spontaneous collaboration. It is fundamental that mobile users and devices can authenticate in an autonomous way without relying on a common authentication infrastructure. In order to face this problem, we need to examine the challenges introduced by "global computing", a term coined by the EU for the future of the global information society, and to identify their impact on security.

Cryptocurrencies, such as Bitcoin, use methods such as proof of work (PoW) to achieve computational trust inside the transaction network.

== History ==
Computational Trust applies the human notion of trust to the digital world, that is seen as malicious rather than cooperative. The expected benefits, according to Marsh et al., result in the use of others' ability through delegation, and in increased cooperation in an open and less protected environment. Research in the area of computational mechanisms for trust and reputation in virtual societies is directed towards increased reliability and performance of digital communities.

A trust-based decision in a specific domain is a multi-stage process. The first step of this process consists in identifying and selecting the proper input data, that is, the trust evidence. In general, these are domain-specific and are derived from an analysis conducted over the application involved. In the next step, a trust computation is performed on the evidence to produce trust values, that means the estimation of the trustworthiness of entities in that particular domain. The selection of evidence and the subsequent trust computation are informed by a notion of trust defined in the trust model. Finally, the trust decision is taken by considering the computed values and exogenous factors, like disposition or risk assessments.

== Defining trust ==
These concepts have heightened relevance in the last decade in computer science, particularly in the area of distributed artificial intelligence. The multi-agent system paradigm and the growth of e-commerce have increased interest in trust and reputation. In fact, trust and reputation systems have been recognized as the key factors for electronic commerce. These systems are used by intelligent software agents as an incentive in decision-making, when deciding whether or not to honor contracts, and as a mechanism to search trustworthy exchange partners. In particular, reputation is used in electronic markets as a trust-enforcing mechanism or as a method to avoid cheaters and frauds.

Another area of application of these concepts in agent technology is teamwork and cooperation. Several definitions of the human notion of trust have been proposed during the last years in different domains from sociology, psychology to political and business science. These definitions may even change in accordance with the application domain. For example, Romano's recent definition tries to encompass the previous work in all these domains:

Trust is a subjective assessment of another’s influence in terms of the extent of one’s perception about the quality and significance of another’s impact over one’s outcomes in a given situation, such that one’s expectation of, openness to, and inclination toward such influence provide a sense of control over the potential outcomes of the situation.

Trust and reputation both have a social value. When someone is trustworthy, that person may be expected to perform in a beneficial or at least not in a suspicious way that assure others, with high probability, good collaborations with him. On the contrary, when someone appears not to be trustworthy, others refrain from collaborating since there is a lower level of probability that these collaborations will be successful.

Trust is a particular level of the subjective probability with which an agent assesses that another agent or group of agents will perform a particular action, both before he can monitor such action (or independently or his capacity ever to be able to monitor it) and in a context in which it affects his own action.

Trust is strongly connected to confidence and it implies some degrees of uncertainty, hopefulness or optimism. Eventually, Marsh addressed the issue of formalizing trust as a computational concept in his PhD thesis. His trust model is based on social and psychological factors.

From a historical-epistemological perspective, Vicente and Sabiguero distinguish interpersonal trust from technical uses of the term associated with verification, credentials and certification. They traced the subsequent adoption of this technical vocabulary in legal frameworks governing electronic signatures and trust services.

=== Trust model classification ===
A lot of proposals have appeared in the literature and here a selection of computational trust and reputation models, that represent a sample of the current research, is presented.

Trust and reputation can be analysed from different points of view and can be applied in many situations. The next classification is based considering the peculiar characteristics of these models and the environment where they evolve.

==== Conceptual model ====
Trust and reputation model can be characterized as:

- Cognitive

In models based on a cognitive approach, Trust and reputation are made up of underlying beliefs and are a function of the degree of these beliefs. The mental states, that lead to trust another agent or to assign a reputation, are an essential part of the model, as well as the mental consequences of the decision and the act of relying on another agent;

- Neurological

In neurological trust models based neurological theories on the interaction between affective and cognitive states are modeled on a neurological level as well by using theories on the embodiment of emotions. In these models the trust dynamics relate to experiences with (external) sources, both from a cognitive and affective perspective. More specifically for feeling the emotion associated to a mental state, converging recursive body loops are modeled. In addition, based on Hebbian learning (for the strength of the connections to the emotional responses) different adaptation processes are introduced, which are inspired by the Somatic Marker Hypothesis.

- Game-theoretical

Trust and reputation are considered subjective probabilities by which the individual A, expects the individual B to perform a given action on which its welfare depends.

In this approach, trust and reputation are not the result of a mental state of the agent in a cognitive sense, but the result of a more pragmatic game with utility functions and numerical aggregation of past interactions.

==== Information sources ====
It is possible to sort out models by considering the information sources used to compute Trust and reputation values. The traditional information sources are direct experiences and witness information, but recent models have started to consider the connection between information and the sociological aspect of agent's behavior. When the model contains several information sources it can increase the reliability of the results, but conversely, it can increase the complexity of the model.

===== Direct experiences =====
Direct experience is the most relevant and reliable information source for a Trust/reputation model. Two types of direct experiences can be recognizable:

- the experience based on the direct interaction with the interlocutor;
- the experience based on the observed interaction of the other members of a community.

===== Witness information =====
Witness information, also called indirect information, is what comes from the experience of other members of community. It can be based on their own direct experience or on other data they gathered from others’ experience. Witness information is usually the most abundant but its use is complex for trust and reputation modelling. In fact, it introduces uncertainty and agents can manipulate or hide parts of the information for their own benefit.

===== Sociological information =====
People that belong to a community establish different types of relations. Each individual plays one or several roles in that society, influencing their behavior and the interaction with other people. In a multi-agent system, where there are plenty of interactions, the social relations among agents are a simplified reflection of the more complex relations of their human counterparts. Only a few trust and reputation models adopt this sociological information, using techniques like social network analysis. These methods study social relationships among individuals in a society that emerged as a set of methods for the analysis of social structures, methods that specifically allow an investigation of the relational aspects of these structures.

Social relationships can provide an additional source of information for computational models of trust e.g., Social network analysis can therefore be used to model, infer, and predict trust relationships. Jen Golbeck et al applied social-network analysis to trust on the Semantic Web and proposed methods for inferring trust relationships between users from the structure of a network. This work demonstrated how trust between individuals without a direct relationship could be estimated from connections in a wider social network. Another line of research has examined the formation and prediction of trust relationships via computational methods. Muhammad Aurangzeb Ahmad studied computational trust in online social environments, especially massively multiplayer online games, by employing behavioral and social-network data to investigate how trust relationships form and evolve. Zoheb Borbora et. al. modeled trust formation as a link prediction problem across multiple social networks. The study found that shared interests and skills, activity, expertise, and network-topological characteristics were useful predictors of trust formation.

===== Prejudice and bias =====
Prejudice is another, though uncommon, mechanism that influences trust and reputation. According to this method, an individual is given properties of a particular group that make him recognisable as a member. These can be signs such as a uniform, a definite behavior, etc.

As most people today use the word, prejudice refers to a negative or hostile attitude towards another social group, often racially defined. However, this negative connotation has to be revised when applied to agent communities. The set of signs used in computational trust and reputations models are usually out of the ethical discussion, differently from the signs used in human societies, like skin color or gender.

Most of the literature in cognitive and social sciences claims that humans exhibit non-rational, biased behavior with respect to trust. Recently biased human trust models have been designed, analyzed and validated against empirical data. The results show that such biased trust models are able to predict human trust significantly better than unbiased trust models.

== Discussion on trust/reputation models ==
The most relevant sources of information considered by the trust and reputation models presented before, are direct experiences and witness information. In e-markets, sociological information is almost non-existent and, in order to increase the efficiency of actual trust and reputation models, it should be considered. However, there is no reason to increase the complexity of models introducing trust evidence if, later, they have to be used in an environment where it is not possible to realise their capabilities. The aggregation of more trust and reputation evidence is useful in a computational model but it can increase its complexity making a general solution difficult. Several models are dependent on the characteristics of the environment and a possible solution could be the use of adaptive mechanisms that can modify how to combine different sources of information in a given environment. A lot of trust and reputation definitions have been presented and there are several works that give meaning to both concepts.

There is a relation between both the concepts that should be considered in depth: reputation is a concept that helps to build trust on others. Nowadays, game theory is the predominant paradigm considered to design computational trust and reputation models. In all likelihood, this theory is taken into account because a significant number of economists and computer scientists, with a strong background in game theory and artificial intelligence techniques, are working in multi-agent and e-commerce contexts. Game theoretical models produce good results but may not be appropriate when the complexity of the agents, in terms of social relations and interaction increases, becomes too restrictive. The exploration of new possibilities should be considered and, for example, there should be a merging of cognitive approaches with game theoretical ones. Apart from that, more trust evidence should be considered, as well as time-sensitive trust metrics. represent the first step to encourage the improvement of computational trust.

An important issue in modeling trust is represented by the transferability of trust judgements by different agents. Social scientists agree to consider unqualified trust values as not transferable, but a more pragmatic approach would conclude that qualified trust judgments are worth being transferred as far as decisions taken considering others’ opinion are better than the ones taken in isolation. In the authors investigated the problem of trust transferability in open distributed environments, proposing a translation mechanism able to make information exchanged from one agent to another more accurate and useful.

=== Evaluation of trust models ===
Currently, there is no commonly accepted evaluation framework or benchmark that would allow for a comparison of the models under a set of representative and common conditions. A game-theoretic approach in this direction has been proposed, where the configuration of a trust model is optimized assuming attackers with optimal attack strategies; this allows in a next step to compare the expected utility of different trust models. Similarly, a model-based analytical framework for predicting the effectiveness of reputation mechanisms against arbitrary attack models in arbitrary system models has been proposed for Peer-to-Peer systems.

== See also ==
- IT risk
- IT risk management
- Kerberos (protocol)
- Public key infrastructure
