= Chen Wen-tsuen =

Taiwanese computer scientist and electrical engineer

- 陳文村
- Born: 27 May 1948; Taichung County (now part of Taichung City), Taiwan
- Education: National Tsing Hua University (BS); University of California, Berkeley (MS, PhD)
- Awards: Technical Achievement Award, IEEE Computer Society; National Chair, Ministry of Education, Taiwan; Taylor L. Booth Education Award, IEEE Computer Society
- Scientific career
- Fields: Computer science
- Workplaces: National Tsing Hua University (1976–); Academia Sinica (2012–)
- Thesis: Toward automated validation of computer programs (1976)
- Doctoral advisor: Chittoor V. Ramamoorthy

Chen Wen-tsuen (Chinese: 陳文村; pinyin: Chén Wéncūn; born 27 May 1948) is a Taiwanese computer scientist and electrical engineer. He is a distinguished research fellow at the Academia Sinica and a lifelong national chair of the Ministry of Education, Taiwan. From 2006 to 2010, he was the president of National Tsing Hua University, a premier research university in Taiwan.

== Education ==
Chen graduated from National Tsing Hua University with a Bachelor of Science (B.S.) in nuclear engineering in 1970. He then pursued graduate studies in the United States, earning a Master of Science (M.S.) in 1973 and his Ph.D. in 1976, both in electrical engineering and computer science from the University of California, Berkeley. His doctoral dissertation, completed under computer scientist Chittoor V. Ramamoorthy, was titled, "Toward automated validation of computer programs".

== Career ==
Chen started his academic career as a faculty member of the computer science program of the Institute of Applied Mathematics of National Tsing Hua University. He helped found the Department of Computer Science of the university in 1977. He has also helped develop the software engineering program of the Institute for Information Industry, a non-governmental organization for promoting information industry in Taiwan, since its founding in 1979. In early 1980s, Chen established his computer network laboratory and was one of the pioneering computer network researchers in Taiwan.

Chen served as the chairman of the Department of Computer Science of National Tsing Hua University from 1983 until 1988. From 1988 for four years, he was a science and technology advisor to the Ministry of Education and helped establish the Taiwan Academic Network (TANet), the first Internet in Taiwan. From 1992 to 1996, he was on leave from National Tsing Hua University to serve as the director of the Advisory Office of Ministry of Education to advise on education policy and improve higher education in Taiwan. Chen founded the Computer and Communication Research Center of the university in 1994 and served as its founding director for 10 years. He also founded the College of Electrical Engineering and Computer Science in 1998 and served as its founding dean for 6 years. From 2003 to 2006, he was the vice chancellor (research) of the University System of Taiwan, a university alliance of four top research universities in northern Taiwan.

In February 2006, Chen was appointed as president of the National Tsing Hua University. During his 4-year term of presidency, the university was noted for initiating the "Project Thousand Points of Light" (繁星計畫) university entrance program, which was enthusiastically endorsed and adopted by the Ministry of Education, and launching the Tsing Hua College (清華學院]), a residential college for undergraduate education, the first of its kind in Taiwan. Since August 2006, he had been a distinguished chair professor of the university.

In 2007 Chen attended an Association of East Asian Research Universities Board of Directors meeting and the same year he visited Japan along with Professors Chungmin Chen and Mao Jiun Wang. Also education and research of the university was significantly improved and well recognized internationally. In 2010, the Times Higher Education World University Rankings put National Tsing Hua University 107th in the world, advanced from 343rd in 2006.

In 2008 Chen met with Vice President Chang Shih-Lin and together they held a press conference with Thomson Reuters Essential Science Indicators.

In March 2012 he joined the Academia Sinica as a distinguished research fellow of the Institute of Information Science.

Besides his contributions to education, Chen has also contributed to advancement of industrial technologies in Taiwan by serving as consultant and advisor in various levels of Taiwan government and industrial research organizations including Ministry of Economic Affairs, Institute for Information Industry, and Industrial Technology Research Institute. From 1990 for 14 years, he served as co-chairman and chairman of the technical evaluation committee of the industrial technology research grants program of Ministry of Economic Affairs, which is recognized as one of the most successful programs in advancing industrial technologies in Taiwan. From July 2006 for 4 years, he was a science and technology advisor to Premier, Executive Yuan of Taiwan. Starting in January 2011, he is the program director of the National Program for Intelligent Electronics of the National Science Council, aiming at developing advanced and innovative industrial technologies for bio-medical, green, automotive, and ICT electronics.

== Research ==
Chen's early research work was on software engineering. His research results have been used in an automated software testing system designed for NASA of United States. Chen pioneered the design of computer networks and parallel processing systems in early 1980s. He designed the first computer network and the first parallel processing system with its parallel processor chips in Taiwan. From 2000 for eight years, Chen was the principal investigator of a project under the Program for Promoting Academic Excellence of Universities, jointly sponsored by the Ministry of Education and the National Science Council, leading a team of researchers from National Tsing Hua University and National Chiao Tung University to research on broadband packet switching networks, heterogeneous wireless networks, and advanced Internet applications.

Chen's major contributions to parallel processing are on investigation of capability of parallel systems and proposing parallel algorithms of fundamental importance. In computer networking, he has done pioneering works on secure broadcasting, design of broadband switches, and quality-of-service techniques in cellular networks. He received numerous awards for his achievements in computer networking and parallel processing research, including Outstanding Research Awards of National Science Council, the prestigious Academic Award and National Chair of Ministry of Education, the Technical Achievement Award and Taylor L. Booth Education Award of IEEE Computer Society.

Chen has been an editor and Editor-in-Chief of the Journal of Information Science and Engineering of the Academia Sinica. He is the founding General Chair of the IEEE International Conference on Parallel and Distributed Systems and the General Chair of 2000 IEEE International Conference on Distributed Computing Systems among others. He is a Fellow Member of the IEEE for contribution to software engineering and parallel processing systems design and a Fellow of the Chinese Society for Management of Technology.

== Awards and honors ==
- Distinguished Computer Professionals Award, Ministry of Economic Affairs, 1984
- Distinguished Visitor (local computer networks), IEEE Computer Society, 1984–1985
- Sun Yat-sen Technology Innovation Award, Sun Yat-sen Academics and Culture Foundation, 1989
- Outstanding Research Awards, National Science Council, 1990, 1992, 1994
- Distinguished Visitor (broadband communications networks), IEEE Computer Society, 1994–1997
- IEEE Fellow, 1994
- Academic Award in Engineering, Ministry of Education, 1994
- Outstanding Scholarship Chair, Foundation for the Advancement of Outstanding Scholarship, 1996–2001
- Technical Achievement Award, IEEE Computer Society, 1999
- Pan Wen Yuan Outstanding Research Award, Pan Wen Yuan Foundation, 2000
- National Chair, Ministry of Education, 2001–2004
- Outstanding Research Fellow Award, National Science Council, 2002
- Medal of Honor in Information Sciences, Institute of Information and Computing Machinery ROC, 2003
- Tsing Hua Professor of Electrical Engineering and Computer Sciences, National Tsing Hua University, 2003
- Distinguished Visitor (wireless networks), IEEE Computer Society, 2004–2006
- Outstanding Contribution Award, Taiwan IC Design Society, 2004
- Fellow, Chinese Society for Management of Technology, 2004
- Lifelong National Chair, Ministry of Education, 2004
- Distinguished Alumnus Award in Computer Sciences and Engineering, University of California, Berkeley, 2006
- Tsing Hua Distinguished Chair Professor, National Tsing Hua University, 2006
- C. V. Ramamoorthy Distinguished Scholar Award, Society for Design and Process Science, 2008
- Outstanding Leadership Award, Ministry of Education, 2010
- Eminent Researcher, National Research Council Canada, 2010
- Taylor L. Booth Education Award, IEEE Computer Society, 2011

Academic offices
| Preceded by Frank Shu | President of National Tsing Hua University; 2006-2010 | Succeeded by Lih-Juann Chen |
