= Andrew H. Van de Ven =

American business theorist (1945–2022)

- Born: October 30, 1945; Schijndel, Netherlands
- Died: April 30, 2022 (aged 76); Long Lake, Minnesota, US
- Education: St. Norbert College (BBA); University of Wisconsin–Madison (PhD)
- Known for: Nominal group technique; Minnesota Innovation Research Program; organization assessment; engaged scholarship research methods
- Scientific career
- Fields: Organization theory
- Workplaces: Kent State University; University of Pennsylvania; University of Minnesota
- Doctoral advisor: Andre Delbecq

Andrew Henry Van de Ven (October 30, 1945 – April 30, 2022) was an American organization scholar, and Professor Emeritus in the Carlson School of Management of the University of Minnesota.

== Biography ==
Andrew H. Van de Ven received his bachelor's degree in Philosophy and Business Administration from St. Norbert College. Ph.D. from the University of Wisconsin–Madison in 1972.

Van de Ven taught at Kent State University (1972–1975) and the Wharton School of the University of Pennsylvania (1975–1981) before joining the Carlson School. He taught courses on the management of innovation and change, organizational behavior, and research methods.

Van de Ven was 2000-2001 President of the Academy of Management and founding editor of the Academy of Management Discoveries (2013-2017). An active member of the Academy of Management for 40 years, he was elected an officer of the Organization and Management Theory Division (1979–1982), a representative-at-large on the Board of Governors (1982–1984), a Fellow of the Academy of Management (1988), and consulting editor for Academy of Management Review (1996–1998). He has also served as a founding senior editor of Organization Science (1989–1996) and is on editorial boards of other journals and book series.

In 1996 Van de Ven and Scott Poole received the Academy of Management Review Best Article Award for “Explaining Development and Change in Organizations,” (AMR, vol. 20, no.3). In 1997 Van de Ven was given the Distinguished Scholar Career Award by the Organization and Management Theory Division of the Academy of Management. He was also selected to give the Distinguished Scholar Lecture by the Technology and Innovation Management Division in 2002 and the Health Care Management Division in 2005 of the Academy of Management.

His 1999 co-authored book, The Innovation Journey (Oxford Univ. Press) was selected a finalist for the Academy of Management Terry Book Award, given annually to the book that makes the most significant advancement to management knowledge. His 2000 co-authored book, Organizational Change and Innovation Processes: Theory and Methods for Research (Oxford Univ. Press) was selected as the best book of 2000-2001 by the Organizational Communication Division of the National Communication Association.

In 2008, Van de Ven was awarded by the Academy of Management the Terry Book Award for his book Engaged Scholarship. A 1992 paper co-authored by Andrew Van de Ven received the Strategic Management Society's Dan and Mary Lou Schendel Best Paper Prize for 2008. The paper, "Structuring Cooperative Relationships Between Organizations," was written with Professor Peter Smith Ring of the College of Business Administration at Loyola Marymount University in Los Angeles. The paper was originally published in the Strategic Management Journal in 1992. Van de Ven is listed on the Thomson - ISI Essential Indicators as the 26th most highly cited economist in the world.

Van de Ven was the founding Editor-in-Chief of Academy of Management Discoveries, a journal for exploratory, abductive, research in management and organizations.

== Work ==
Throughout his career Van de Ven has conducted longitudinal research on a variety of organization and management topics. Starting in the late 1960s he co-developed (with Andre Delbecq) the Nominal Group Technique, which has diffused worldwide to become the most widely used method of group brainstorming.

During the 1970s he developed and tested models for Program Planning (by studying the creation of early childhood programs in 14 Texas counties) and Organization Assessment (by measuring and assessing the jobs, work groups, and organizations of job service and unemployment compensation programs located throughout Wisconsin and California).

In the 1980s Van de Ven directed the Minnesota Innovation Research Program that consisted of 30 researchers who tracked the development of 14 different innovations from concept to implementation.

Since 1994 Van de Ven has been conducting a longitudinal field study of the processes of organizational change that are unfolding in Minnesota health care organizations and industry since 1994. Over the years, Van de Ven has published numerous papers and books on this research, as well as on organization and management theories and research methods.

== Publications ==
- Andrew H. Van de Ven (1974) Group Decision Making Effectiveness: An Experimental Study. Kent, Ohio: Kent State University Press.
- Andre L. Delbecq, Andrew H. Van de Ven, and David H. Gustafson, (1975) Group Techniques for Program Planning. Chicago: Scott, Foresman, and Co.
- Andrew H. Van de Ven and Diane Ferry (1980) Measuring and Assessing Organizations. New York: Wiley Interscience.
- Andrew H. Van de Ven and William F. Joyce (eds.)(1981) Perspectives on Organization Design and Behavior. New York: Wiley Interscience.
- Andrew H. Van de Ven, Harold Angle, and M. Scott Poole (eds.) (1989) Research on the Management of Innovation: The Minnesota Studies. New York: Ballinger Publishing/Harper and Row.
- Peter Lorange, Bala Chakravarthy, Johan Root, and Andrew Van de Ven (eds.) (1993) Implementing Strategic Processes: Change, Learning and Cooperation. London: Basil Blackwell.
- George P. Huber and Andrew H. Van de Ven (editors) (1995) Longitudinal Field Research Methods: Studying Processes of Organizational Change. Thousand Oaks, CA: Sage Publishers.
- Nigel Nicholsen (ed.) and Randall Schuler and Andrew H. Van de Ven (advisor editors) (1995) Encyclopedic Dictionary of Organizational Behavior. London: Basil Blackwell.
- Andrew Van de Ven, Douglas Polley, Raghu Garud, and S. Venkataraman (1999) The Innovation Journey. New York: Oxford University Press.
- Marshall Scott Poole, Andrew H. Van de Ven, and Kevin Dooley (2000) Organizational Change and Innovation Processes: Theory and Methods for Research. New York: Oxford University Press.
- Marshall Scott Poole and Andrew H. Van de Ven (eds.) (2004) Handbook of Organizational Change and Innovation. New York: Oxford University Press.
- Andrew H. Van de Ven (2007) Engaged Scholarship: A Guide to Organizational and Social Research. Oxford University Press
- Garud, R., Tuertscher, P., & Van de Ven, A. H. (2013). Perspectives on innovation processes. The Academy of Management Annals, 7(1), 775–819.
- Van de Ven, A. H., Bechara, J. P. & Sun, K. (2017). How Outcome Agreement and Power Balance Among Parties Influence Processes of Organizational Learning and Non-Learning. Journal of Management. Forthcoming.
- Tel, F., Berggrey, C., Brusoni S., and Van de Ven A.H. (editors) (2017). Managing Knowledge Integration Across Boundaries, Oxford, U.K.: Oxford University Press.
