= Taiwan Creative Content Agency =

Administrative institution of the Ministry of Culture of Taiwan

- Traditional Chinese: 文化內容策進院
Transcriptions

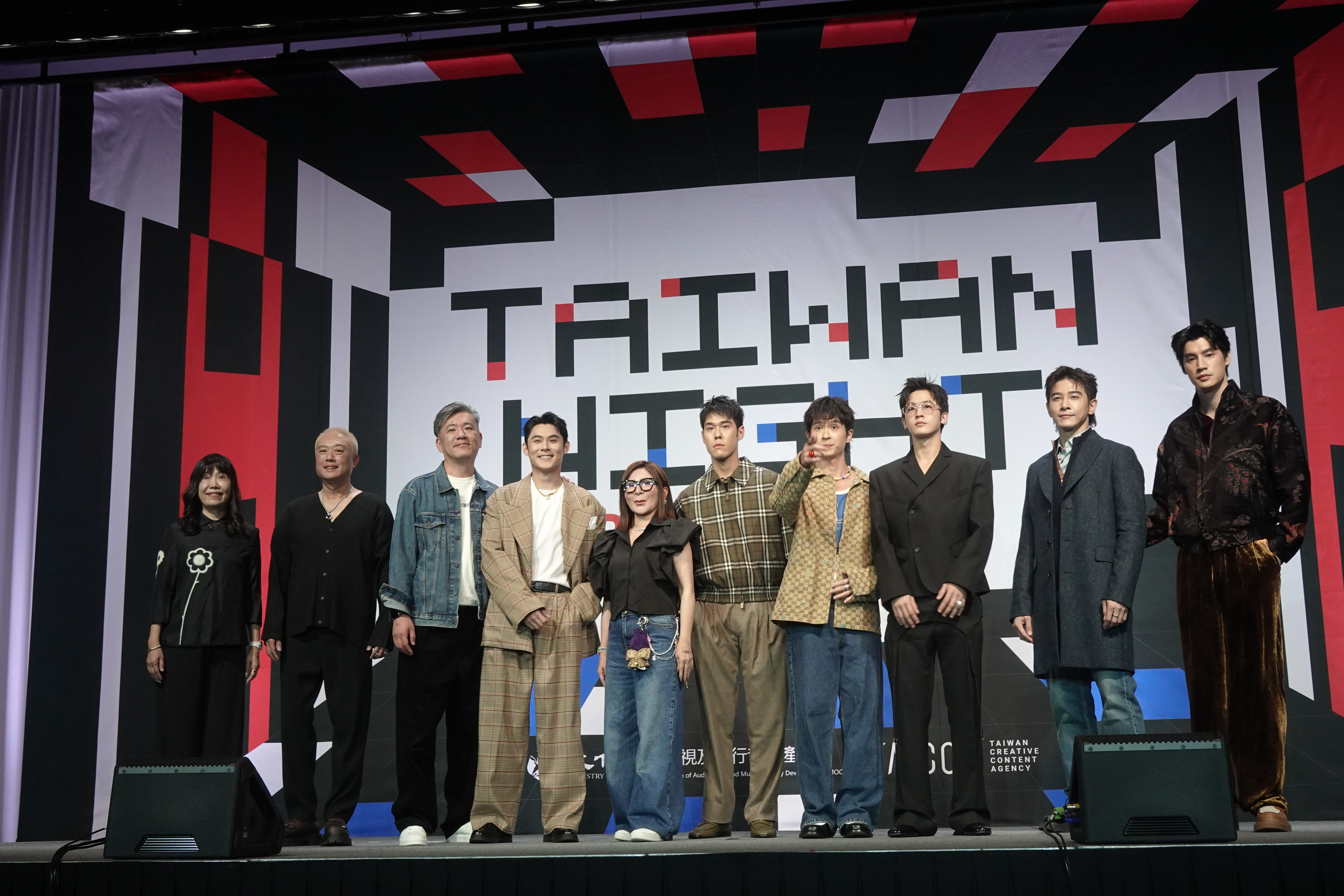
Taiwan night hosted by TAICCA at the 2025 Busan International Film Festival.

The Taiwan Creative Content Agency (TAICCA) is an administrative institution of the Ministry of Culture of Taiwan for influencing entertainment industries, including films, television, publishing, pop music, and animation.

== History ==
The agency was established in 2019 by Taiwan's Organizational Act of the Taiwan Creative Content Agency to be an "administrative institution" (行政法人) under the Ministry of Culture of Taiwan.

In its role, TAICCA has a presence at many international film markets such as SXSW, the Berlin International Film Festival, the Busan International Film Festival and the Hong Kong-Asia Film Financing Forum. It also establishes international partnerships with organizations such as the animation school Gobelins Paris and the European production group Federation Studios.

Among the programs TAICCA has overseen is the Taiwan Creative Content Fest (TCCF) and Taiwan International Co-funding Program (TICP), which was launched in January 2021 and paused in 2024.

== International partnerships ==
In October 2026, TAICCA signed a memorandum of understanding with South Korean producer B.A. Entertainment during the Busan International Film Festival and its Asian Contents & Film Market (ACFM), covering talent development, financing, co-productions and international distribution. Participating Taiwanese companies included 1 Production Film Co. and Money Entertainment Investment Co. TAICCA also hosted a "Taiwan Night" reception attended by more than 500 industry professionals and buyers, and its ACFM pavilion showcased 235 works.
