= David Huffaker =

American technologist

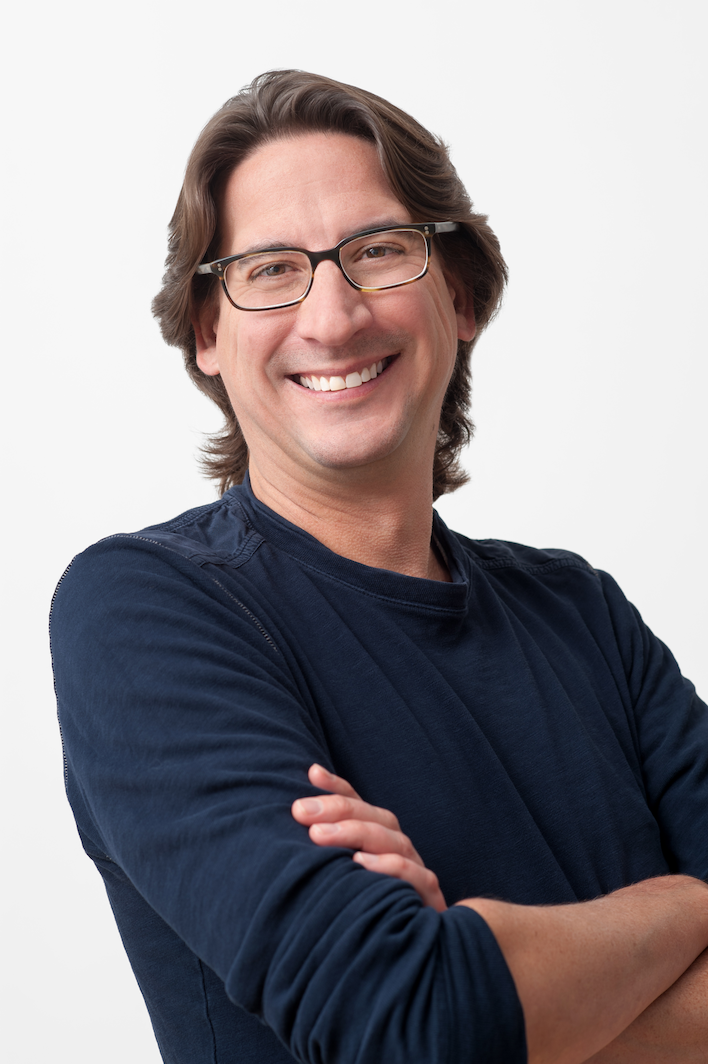
- Education: University of Central Florida; Georgetown University; Northwestern University
- Scientific career
- Fields: Technology; User experience
- Workplaces: Google, Inc.

David Huffaker is the director of UX research for Google Maps. His current research focuses on understanding communication and social behavior to inform the design of HCI system. He attended the University of Central Florida Burnett Honors College in the class of '97, and was honored in 2014 with a Professional Achievement Award from that college. He holds a Ph.D. in media, technology and society from Northwestern University. His PhD advisor was Noshir Contractor. Together with Simon Fung, Huffaker invented the invented times feature on Google Maps which tracks historic and real-time busyness at various places around the world.

== Research ==
Huffaker, with co-researcher Sandra Calvert, studied the phenomenon of identity on the Internet. Their work concluded that, unlike the conclusions of researchers like Sherry Turkle, identity was singular and consistent across platforms.

His studies on blogging conclude that blogging is a positive activity for teens because it allows them to learn to tell stories, which he sees as important for promoting literacy.

His work has been incorporated into the data science curriculum at the City of London College of Economics.

== Selected writings ==
- Huffaker, David A., and Sandra L. Calvert. "Gender, identity, and language use in teenage blogs." Journal of computer-mediated communication 10, no. 2 (2005): JCMC10211.
- Huffaker, David. "The educated blogger: Using weblogs to promote literacy in the classroom." AACE Review (Formerly AACE Journal) 13, no. 2 (2005): 91-98.
- Huffaker, David. "Dimensions of leadership and social influence in online communities." Human Communication Research 36, no. 4 (2010): 593-617.
- Huffaker, David A., and Sandra L. Calvert. "The new science of learning: Active learning, metacognition, and transfer of knowledge in e-learning applications." Journal of Educational Computing Research 29, no. 3 (2003): 325-334.
- Huffaker, David. "Teen blogs exposed: The private lives of teens made public." Proceedings of American Association for the Advancement of Science. AU VOL/ISS/DATE/PAGE (2006).
