= TANet =

The Taiwan Academic Network (TANet) was founded in 1980 by Ministry of Education (Taiwan) and Taiwanese universities in order to assist with teaching and research activities for educational and research institutions. In 2006, TANet provided services to almost 4 million people.

As of 2014, all colleges and universities are connected to the network, as well as another 4,000 primary and secondary schools.

== History ==
In mid 1980, The Ministry of Education introduce BITNET university teaching and research network system, providing research network with international e-mail and files transfer services. In late 1980, Ministry of Education Science and Technology Advisory Office (Renamed to Advisory Office in 1990)Director Chang Jin-fu provision is made and commissioned by the Science and Technology Advisory Wen-Tsuen Chen to subsidy mainly the National Universities to build a universities network. July 1990, Ministry of Education computer center invite those universities to set up a "Taiwan Academic Network (TANet)" using TCP/IP protocol of Internet-based system. It was Taiwan's first Internet system, but also basis of the internet system of Taiwan further development of government and commercial Internet. Since 1999, Ministry of Education to promote primary and secondary schools to use ADSL connections to TANet, make IT education down roots, so far TANet has become the platform of network and information for all levels of school education.

The early TANet connecting Taiwan academic institutions and research institutions are using telephone connection, bandwidth was 9.6 kbit/s. On 3 December 1991, a 64 kbit/s data connection to JvNCnet in Princeton University, United States was made. It was Taiwan's first international network connection. In early 1994, a T1 connection is connected to Hinet, become Taiwan's first peering Internet connection. In June 1994, a 10 Mbit/s Ethernet connection to SEEDNet, Taiwan start to connect to multi-network network connection. After years of expansion of TANet, TANet Network Structure can be divided in National Backbone Network, Area-based Network and School-Based Network, TANet National Backbone Network was upgraded to 10 Gigabit Ethernet in 2005. As of April 2008, connection to the United States was STM16 (2488.32 Mbit/s), connection to Taiwan other networks bandwidth was 102.718 Gbit/s.

== TANet Network Structure ==
TANet Network Structure is as below:

TANet select one University Unit in various location, and setup Network Regional Center, to assist the school and Academic Research Unit in sharing Internet Resource in the region.

1. Taipei Network Regional Center:
  - National Taiwan University Computer and Information Networking Center
  - National Cheng Chi University Computer Center
2. Taoyuan Network Regional Center: National Central University Computer Center
3. Hsinchu Network Regional Center:
  - National Chiao Tung University Information Technology Service Center
  - National Tsing Hua University Computer Center
4. Taichung Network Regional Center: National Chung Hsing University Computer and Information Network Center
5. Nantou Network Regional Center: National Chi Nan University Computer and Network Center
6. Yunlin and Chiayi Network Regional Center: National Chung Cheng University Computer Center
7. Tainan Network Regional Center: National Cheng Kung University Computer and Network Center
8. KPP Network Regional Center: National Sun Yat-Sen University Office of Library and Information Services
9. Hualien Network Regional Center: National Dong Hwa University Library and Information Center
10. Taitung Network Regional Center: National Taitung University Computer Center

== Domain naming rules ==
1. Adding edu.tw to abbreviation of College University. Example ntu.edu.tw is domain of National Taiwan University.
2. Adding countydomain.edu.tw to English high school name. Example Kaohsiung Municipal Kaohsiung Senior High School English name is kshs, domain name kshs.kh.edu.tw; National Experimental High School English name is nehs, domain name is nehs.hc.edu.tw. Other will follow the rules below:
  1. Senior High School: Abbreviation of school name+hs.countydomain.edu.tw
  2. Full secondary school (School with Junior High and Senior High): Abbreviation of school name+sh.countydomain.edu.tw
  3. Vocational School: Abbreviation of school name+vs.countydomain.edu.tw
  4. 若高工高商家商商工的縮寫名稱過長，依狀況決定。
3. Naming of Girl High School according to the rules below:
  1. Abbreviation of school name+gsh.countydomain.edu.tw
  2. Abbreviation of school name+gs.countydomain.edu.tw
4. Junior High School: Abbreviation of school name+jh.countydomain.edu.tw
5. Naming of Elementary School according to the rules below:
  1. Abbreviation of school name+ps.countydomain.edu.tw
  2. Abbreviation of school name+es.countydomain.edu.tw
6. Junior High and Elementary School: Abbreviation of school name+jps.countydomain.edu.tw
7. Kindergarten: Abbreviation of school name+kg.countydomain.edu.tw

== IP Address Range ==
Assignment of IP Address according to Asia-Pacific Network Information Centre (APNIC) and Taiwan Network Information Center (TWNIC). Most of TANet IP begins with 140.92, 140.109 to 140.138, there also 192.83, 192.192 and 163.13 to 163.28, 163.28 is reserved to TANet and Regional Network Proxy Range.Domain name mainly end with edu.tw.
