= Duminda Wijesekera =

Computer scientist

- Born: 1957 (age 68–69); Colombo, Sri Lanka
- Citizenship: USA
- Education: University of Minnesota; Cornell University; University of Colombo
- Scientific career
- Fields: Data Mining, Machine Learning
- Workplaces: George Mason University; Honeywell
- Thesis: Quality of Service for Continuous Media: Metrics, Validation, Implementation and Performance Evaluation (1997)
- Doctoral advisor: Jaideep Srivastava

Duminda Wijesekera is an American computer scientist of Sri Lankan descent. He is a professor in the Department of Computer Science at George Mason University and acting chair of Cyber Security Engineering Department. Prior to his academic career, he was a senior systems engineer at Honeywell Space Systems. He is also a visiting research scientist at the National Institute of Standards and Technology (NIST). He has a PhD in Computer Science from the University of Minnesota (1997) and a PhD in Mathematical Logic from Cornell University (1990). He has a Bachelors in Mathematics from University of Colombo. He also holds courtesy appointments at the Computer Science Department at the Naval Postgraduate School, NIST. He has published more than 100 research papers in the area of cybersecurity. He was also part of the team that investigated the 2021 Blue Line (Washington Metro) derailment in Washington DC.

Wijesekera also leads the Laboratory of Radio and RADAR Engineering (RARE) which is a collaboration between academia, industry and government. In 2007, he was named a Fellow of the Potomac Institute for Policy Studies. He is also considered to be an expert in identifying money laundering using mathematical models and has done research on linking organ trafficking to terrorist networks.

== Publications ==
- Michael, James Bret, Doron Drusinsky, and Duminda Wijesekera. "Formal Methods in Cyberphysical Systems." Computer 54, no. 09 (2021): 25–29.
- Wang, Lingyu, Duminda Wijesekera, and Sushil Jajodia. "A logic-based framework for attribute based access control." In Proceedings of the 2004 ACM workshop on Formal methods in security engineering, pp. 45–55. 2004.
- Ammann, Paul, Duminda Wijesekera, and Saket Kaushik. "Scalable, graph-based network vulnerability analysis." In Proceedings of the 9th ACM Conference on Computer and Communications Security, pp. 217–224. 2002.
- Lingyu Wang, Sushil Jajodia and Duminda Wijesekera, Preserving Privacy for OnLine Analytical processing, Springer-Verlag, 2006.
