= Priyani Wijesekera =

Sri Lankan lawyer and ambassador

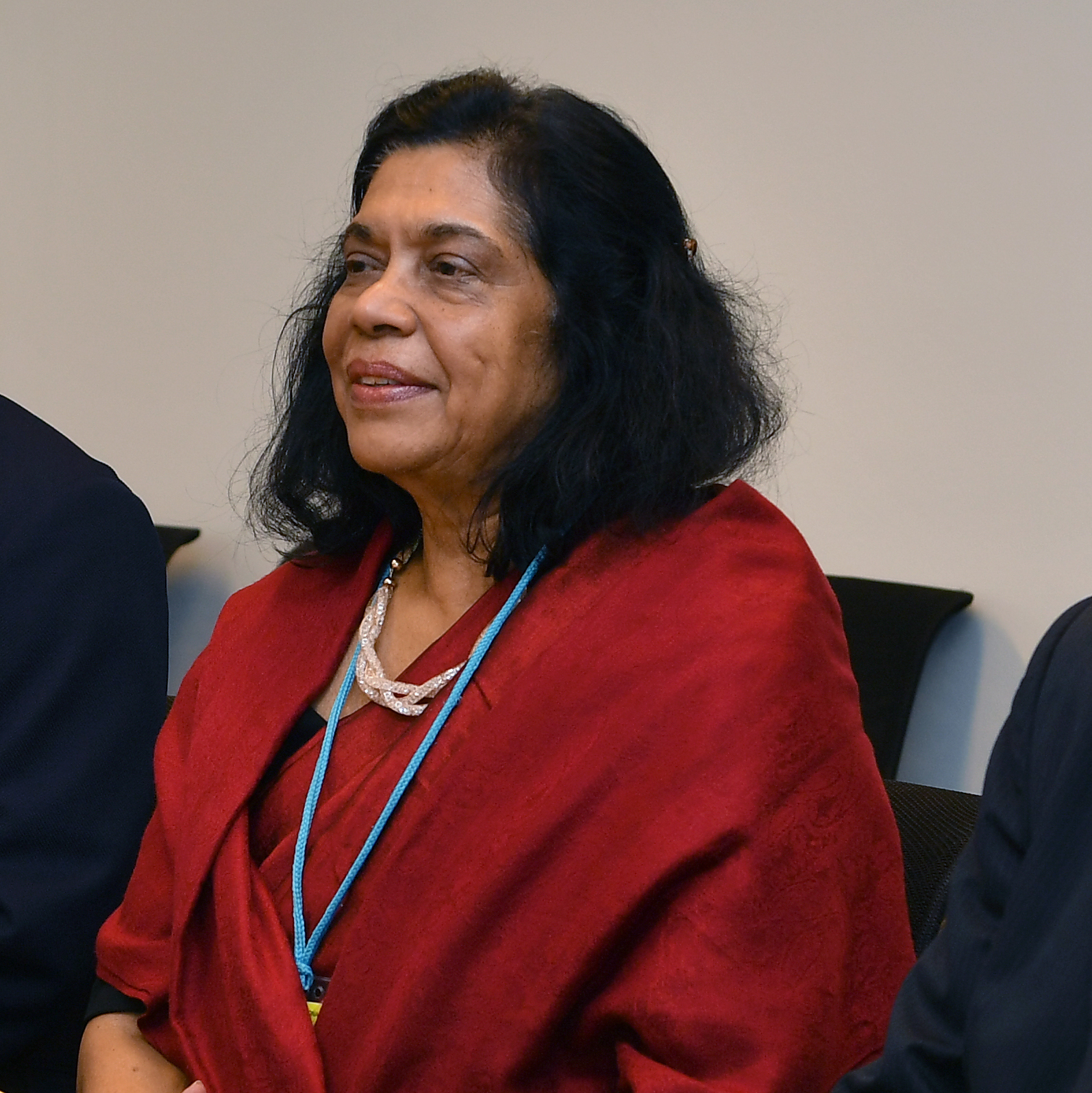
- Occupations: lawyer, ambassador
- Known for: former Secretary General of Parliament

Priyani Wijesekera also spelt as either Priyani Wijesekara or Priyanee Wijesekera is a Sri Lankan lawyer, former Secretary General of Parliament who also served as a former ambassador of Sri Lanka to Austria. She is regarded as one of the prolific prominent figures of women participation in the Parliament of Sri Lanka.

== Career ==
She pursued her career in law and became the first Sri Lankan woman to be elected as the Secretary-General of the Parliament of Sri Lanka. After succeeding as an SG, she took steps and initiatives to increase the women participation in politics by increasing the number of women members in the parliament.

She received the Zonta Award in 2006 from the Zonta International for her significant achievements in the field of Public Law and Human Rights and the award ceremony was held at the Cinnamon Grand. Priyani also became the first Asian woman Secretary-General to receive the Zonta award, an award which is given for women empowerment.

== Controversies ==
In December 2011, she was appointed as one of the members of UNP Working Committee and it caused heated arguments in the parliament at that time.

Wijesekera has also been critical of procedures in the Sri Lankan parliament, especially the way in which problems can be dealt with under the Emergency Regulations which, as she commented, "tends to reduce the legislative procedure to a meaningless ritual".

In September 2018, she along with her senior embassy diplomatic staff were recalled to Sri Lanka from Vienna immediately after failing to attend the phone calls made by President Maithripala Sirisena.
