= Muhammad Aurangzeb Ahmad =

American computer scientist and AI researcher

- Education: Rochester Institute of Technology (BS); University of Minnesota (PhD)
- Known for: Healthcare artificial intelligence Grandpa Bot; Research on digital immortality and griefbots
- Scientific career
- Fields: Artificial intelligence, machine learning, health informatics
- Workplaces: Baylor College of Medicine; Harborview Medical Center; University of Washington
- Thesis: Computational Trust in Multiplayer Online Games (2011)
- Doctoral advisor: Jaideep Srivastava
- Website: aurumahmad.com

Muhammad Aurangzeb Ahmad is an American computer scientist and an assistant professor at Baylor College of Medicine. His research covers artificial intelligence in healthcare, Responsible AI, and digital afterlife. Ahmad built Grandpa Bot, one of the earliest examples of griefbots.

== Early life and education ==
Ahmad earned a bachelor's degree in computer science from the Rochester Institute of Technology in 2006, where he also studied philosophy, and received an honorable mention in the Computing Research Association's 2006 Outstanding Undergraduate Research Award. He received a Ph.D. in computer science from the University of Minnesota in 2011 with a dissertation on computational trust. This research contributed to the launch of a game-analytics startup.

== Career ==
Ahmad held positions in applied AI in various industries before moving into healthcare AI at various startups, Boston Scientific, and at Kaiser Permanente. He held affiliate faculty appointments in computer science at the University of Washington, UW Bothell, and was a research fellow in the Department of Surgery at Harborview Medical Center and affiliated faculty with UW's Responsible AI Systems and Experiences initiative. As of 2026, he is an assistant professor of surgery at Baylor College of Medicine and a member of its ATLAS A.I. research program.

== Research ==
Ahmad's early research was in computational social science, particularly the analysis of behavior and social networks in online games. Since the mid-2010s his work has focused mainly on artificial intelligence in healthcare.

=== Computational social science ===
Ahmad's early research used behavioral data from the MMORPGs. With his colleagues he carried out one of the first systematic studies of automatically detecting "gold farmers", players who illicitly gather virtual goods to sell for real money, and filed a patent application for the method. The group found that gold farmers' networks were structurally similar to real-world drug-trafficking networks, and that farmers trusted highly central ordinary players but not one another. Papers from the project won best paper awards in 2011 at the ACM Web Science Conference and at the Game Behind the Video Game conference at Rutgers University.

=== Healthcare artificial intelligence ===
Ahmad's healthcare research covers clinical prediction, including mortality, critical care and hospital operations, and responsible AI. He helped develop and prospectively validate various predictive models, has worked on hallucination mitigation in medical language models, and led the team that created fairMLHealth, an open-source toolkit for assessing bias in clinical models. He has also led research on AI "surrogates" to estimate the treatment preferences of incapacitated patients. He has argued that they should reflect a patient's values and remain transparent decision aids rather than decision makers. The project tests whether models trained on patients' injury severity, medical history and prior choices can predict their treatment preferences, with accuracy checked against the stated wishes of patients who later recover.

=== Digital afterlife and Grandpa Bot ===
After his father died in 2013, Ahmad built a conversational simulation of him, mainly so that his future children could know their grandfather. The chatbot became known as Grandpa Bot. The project has been included as one of the few studies to address their effects on children; the Markkula Center for Applied Ethics used the project as the basis for a 2018 ethics case study. Ars Technica described Ahmad as one of the first AI researchers to build a grief bot. He has warned that such systems could displace real relationships.

=== AI ethics ===
Ahmad has also worked on AI ethics and governance. He helped create "Rabbi Bot", a chatbot trained on a Houston rabbi's sermons, which The New York Times reported was used to write and deliver a sermon in the rabbi's cloned voice.. Wired included him among Muslim scholars and technologists examining how Islamic ethics can inform the development and use of artificial intelligence.

== Selected works ==
- Ahmad, Muhammad Aurangzeb; Shen, Cuihua; Srivastava, Jaideep; Contractor, Noshir, eds. (2014). Predicting Real World Behaviors from Virtual World Data. Springer Proceedings in Complexity. Springer. doi:10.1007/978-3-319-07142-8. ISBN 978-3-319-07141-1.
- Ahmad, Muhammad Aurangzeb (2016). After Death: Big Data and the Promise of Resurrection by Proxy. CHI '16 Extended Abstracts on Human Factors in Computing Systems. ACM. doi:10.1145/2851581.2892591.
- Ahmad, Muhammad Aurangzeb; Eckert, Carly; Teredesai, Ankur (2018). Interpretable Machine Learning in Healthcare. ACM International Conference on Bioinformatics, Computational Biology, and Health Informatics. pp. 559–560. doi:10.1145/3233547.3233667.
- Ahmad, Muhammad Aurangzeb; Patel, Arpit; Eckert, Carly; Kumar, Vikas; Teredesai, Ankur (2020). Fairness in Machine Learning for Healthcare. 26th ACM SIGKDD International Conference on Knowledge Discovery & Data Mining. pp. 3529–3530. doi:10.1145/3394486.3406461.
- Ahmad, Muhammad Aurangzeb; Eckert, Carly Marie (2023). "Show Your Work: Responsible Model Reporting in Health Care Artificial Intelligence". Surgical Clinics of North America. 103 (2S): e1–e11. doi:10.1016/j.suc.2023.03.002. PMID 37330270.

== See also ==
- Artificial intelligence in healthcare
- Deadbot
- Digital immortality
