= Lane-Poole =

Lane-Poole or Lane Poole is a double-barrelled surname of English origin. Notable individuals with the name include:

- Austin Lane Poole (1889–1963), British historian
- Charles Lane Poole (1885–1970), English-Australian forester
- Reginald Lane Poole (1857–1939), British historian
- Richard Lane-Poole (1883–1971), British naval officer
- Ruth Lane Poole (1885–1974), Irish-Australian interior designer
- Sophia Lane Poole (1804–1891), British orientalist
- Stanley Lane-Poole (1854–1931), British archaeologist

== See also ==
- Lane Poole Reserve
