= Reginald Poole =

Reginald Poole may refer to:

- Reginald Stuart Poole, English archaeologist, numismatist and Orientalist
- Reginald Lane Poole, British historian
- Sir Reginald Ward Poole, British solicitor
