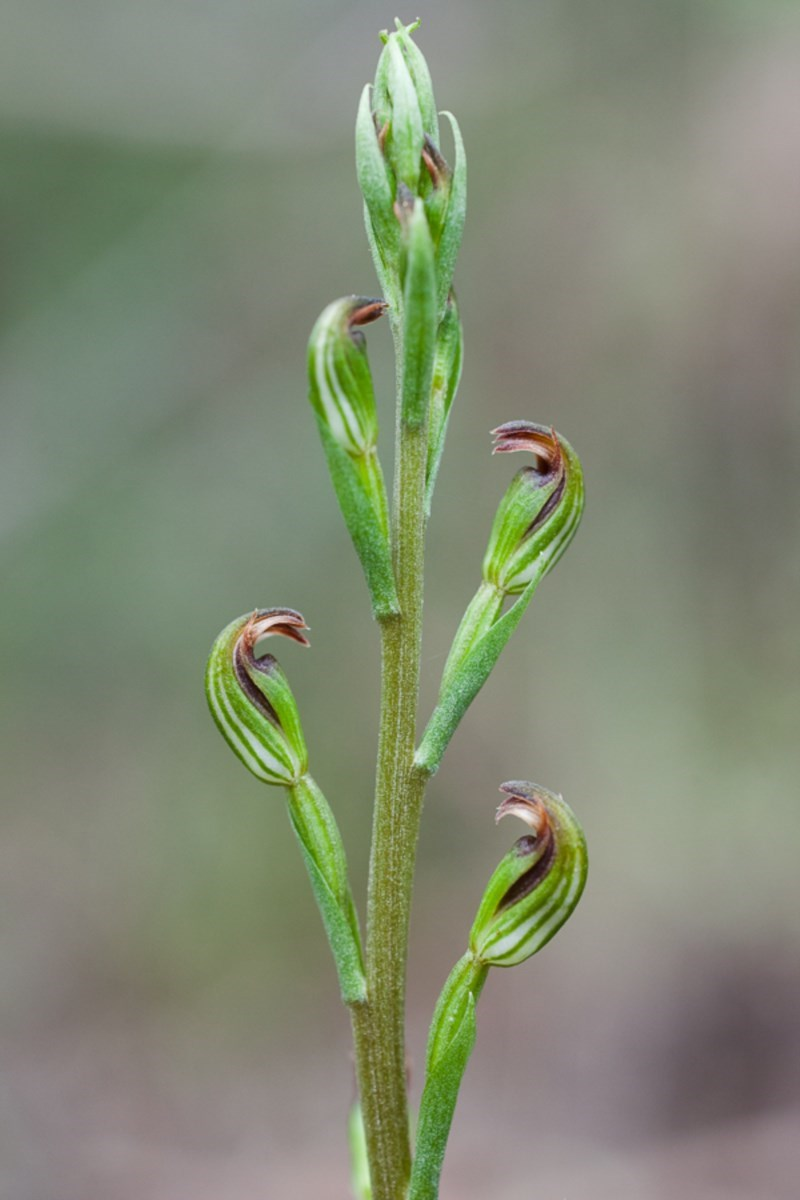
- In Namadgi National Park

Scientific classification
- Kingdom: Plantae
- Clade: Tracheophytes
- Clade: Angiosperms
- Clade: Monocots
- Order: Asparagales
- Family: Orchidaceae
- Subfamily: Orchidoideae
- Tribe: Cranichideae
- Genus: Pterostylis
- Species: P. multiflora

Binomial name
- Pterostylis multiflora (D.L.Jones) Backh.

Synonyms
- Speculantha multiflora D.L.Jones

= Pterostylis multiflora =

Tall tiny greenhood

Species of orchid

Pterostylis multiflora, commonly known as the tall tiny greenhood, is a species of orchid endemic to south-eastern Australia. As with similar orchids, plants in flower differ from those that are not. Those not in flower have a rosette of leaves lying flat on the ground. Plants in flower lack a rosette but have up to twenty tiny green, white, and brown flowers in summer. The flowering stem has up to six stem leaves.

== Description ==
Pterostylis multiflora is a terrestrial, perennial, deciduous, herb with an underground tuber and when not flowering, a rosette of three to eight egg-shaped to heart-shaped leaves that lie flat on the ground. Each leaf is 8–23 mm (0.3–0.9 in) long and 5–15 mm (0.2–0.6 in) wide. Plants in flower have between three and twenty flowers 8–10 mm (0.3–0.4 in) long, crowded on a spike 200–450 mm (8–20 in) high. Between three and six stem leaves are wrapped around the flowering spike. The flowers are green and white near their bases and brownish nearer the tip. The dorsal sepal and petals are fused, forming a hood or "galea" over the column. The galea is erect near its base but then curves forward. The lateral sepals are erect, held closely against the galea with narrow tips about 3 mm (0.1 in) long that do not project above the galea. There is a small notch in the sinus between the bases of the lateral sepals. The labellum is about 3–4 mm (0.1–0.2 in) long, about 1.5 mm (0.06 in) wide and is not visible from outside the flower. Flowering occurs from January to March.

== Taxonomy and naming ==
This greenhood was first formally described in 2008 by David Jones who gave it the name Speculantha multiflora and published the description in Australian Orchid Research. In 2010, Gary Backhouse changed the name to Pterostylis multiflora. The specific epithet (multiflora) is a Latin word meaning "many-flowered".

== Distribution and habitat ==
The tall tiny greenhood grows in open forest with grasses or shrubs in north-eastern Victoria.
