= Austin Lane Poole =

20th-century British historian of the Middle Ages

Austin Lane Poole (6 December 1889 – 22 February 1963) was a British mediaevalist.

Poole came from an academic lineage, being the son of Reginald Lane Poole (archive keeper at the University of Oxford) and Rachael Poole (who catalogued portraits for the same university), the nephew of Stanley Lane Poole (professor of Arabic at Trinity College Dublin), and the great-nephew of Reginald Stuart Poole (professor of archaeology at Cambridge University).

Poole studied at Magdalen College School and Corpus Christi College, Oxford. He later taught at Selwyn College, Cambridge and St John's College, Oxford. He became a Fellow and subsequently President of the latter and was also a Fellow of Corpus Christi College.

During the First World War, Poole served as a lieutenant in the Gloucestershire Regiment.

Poole contributed the third volume of the Oxford History of England, From Domesday Book to Magna Carta 1087–1216, published 1951. He also edited collections of poetry by Thomas Gray. He delivered the Ford Lectures in 1944.

Poole was a tutor in modern history at St John's College, Oxford starting in 1913 and from 14 February 1947 to 1957 was the President of the college.

Academic offices
| Preceded by Cyril Norwood | President of St John's College, Oxford; 1947–1957 | Succeeded by William Costin |
