= Clara S. Lane =

English painter and illustrator

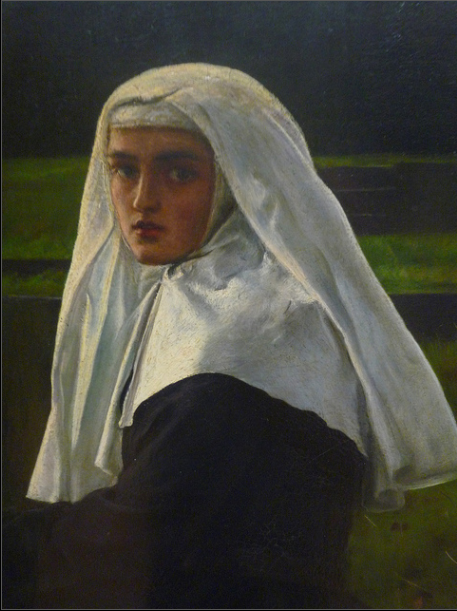
- Clara Lane was the model for the seated nun in The Vale of Rest by Millais
- Born: October 9, 1826; London
- Died: 1918 (aged 91–92)
- Occupation: Painter
- Parent(s): Richard James Lane

Clara Sophia Lane (October 9, 1826 – 1918) was an English painter and illustrator.

Clara Sophia Lane was the eldest daughter of Richard James Lane, an engraver and lithographer who was the great-uncle of poet Gerard Manley Hopkins. Clara and her sister Emily Lane both became artists.

Clara Lane regularly exhibited at the Society of Female Artists and the Royal Academy, usually watercolor works depicting fruit and flowers. She painted portraits of Edward William Lane, her uncle, and James Silk Buckingham, both now in the National Portrait Gallery. Her illustration work included illustrations for Aunt Judy's Tales (1859) by Margaret Gatty, an illustration of Hopkins' poem "The Palimpsest," and the wood engraving of a work by W. J. Linton for the title page of Hopkins' Hawaii: The Past, Present, and Future of its Island-Kingdom (1862).

John Everett Millais used Lane as the model for the seated nun in his painting The Vale of Rest.
