= Cycas lane-poolei =

Conservation status
- Least Concern (IUCN 3.1)

Scientific classification
- Kingdom: Plantae
- Clade: Tracheophytes
- Clade: Gymnospermae
- Division: Cycadophyta
- Class: Cycadopsida
- Order: Cycadales
- Family: Cycadaceae
- Genus: Cycas
- Species: C. lane-poolei

Binomial name
- Cycas lane-poolei C.A.Gardner

Species of cycad

Cycas lane-poolei is a species of cycad. It was first recognised in 1923 by Charles A. Gardner, the Western Australian government botanist, after a 1921 expedition to the Kimberley region. It is named after Charles Lane Poole.
