= Richard James Lane =

English engraver and lithographer (1800-1872)

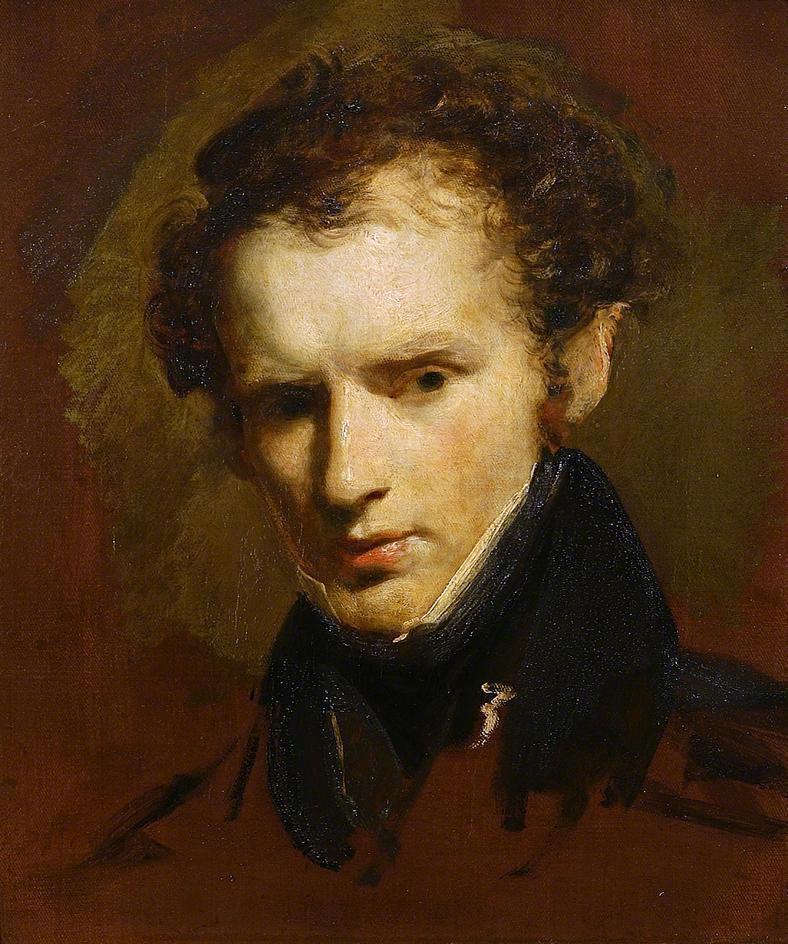
- Lane, portrait by John Jackson, about 1825
- Born: Richard James Lane; 16 February 1800
- Died: 21 November 1872 (aged 72)
- Known for: Engraver; lithographer

Richard James Lane (16 February 1800 – 21 November 1872) was a prolific British engraver and lithographer. The National Portrait Gallery has some 850 lithographs of his portraits and figure studies, done between 1825 and 1850. The images include portraits of royalty, society notables and theatre personalities.

== Life ==
The elder brother of Edward William Lane, and second son of the Rev. Theophilus Lane, LL.D., prebendary of Hereford, he was born at Berkeley Castle, 16 February 1800. His mother was a niece of Thomas Gainsborough the painter. At the age of sixteen he was articled to Charles Heath the line-engraver. In 1824, his prints were already attracting notice, and in 1827, when he produced an engraving of Sir Thomas Lawrence's ‘Red Riding Hood,’ he was elected an associate-engraver of the Royal Academy, although he had shown only a single print at their exhibitions. In later years, he helped obtain in 1865, the admission of engravers to the honour of full academician.

In 1837, he was appointed lithographer to the queen, and in 1840 to Albert, Prince Consort. In 1864, when he had almost given up lithography, he became director of the etching class in the science and art department at the South Kensington Museum, and retained the post almost till his death, which took place on 21 November 1872.

Among his close friends were Charles Kemble, William Macready, Charles Fechter, Maria Feliciá Malibran, and her operatic contemporaries.

== Works ==
In 1829 he drew a well-known portrait of the future Queen Victoria, aged ten years, and he later executed portraits in pencil or chalk of the queen and most of the royal family at various ages, besides prints after Franz Xaver Winterhalter's portraits.

He turned from engraving to lithography. He produced in this medium Sketches from Gainsborough, and a series of copies of Sir Thomas Lawrence's portraits of George IV's cycle. He also lithographed several hundred pictures of the leading artists of the day, especially those of Charles Robert Leslie, Edwin Landseer, George Richmond, and his own special friend John James Chalon; in all 67 of his lithographs were exhibited at the Academy. The total of his prints reached the number of 1,046. He also tried his hand at sculpture, including a life-size seated statue of his brother, Edward Lane, in Egyptian dress.

His ‘Life at the Water-cure,’ 1846, went to three editions. He also edited Charles Kemble's ‘Readings from Shakspeare’ in 3 vols. in 1870.

== Family ==
Richards' family was very accomplished as well. His brother is the notable English orientalist Edward William Lane and his sister Sophia Lane Poole was also an orientalist and author. His nephews Reginald Stuart Poole and Stanley Lane-Poole were also famous orientalist and archaeologist.

Lane married, 10 November 1825, Sophia Hodges, by whom he had two sons (who predeceased him) and three daughters; Clara, Laura, and Emily.

== Gallery ==
Media related to Lanes portraits of notable persons at Wikimedia Commons

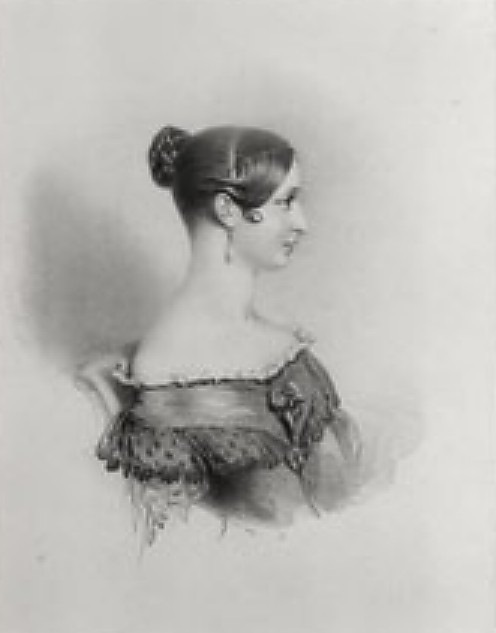
Queen Victoria

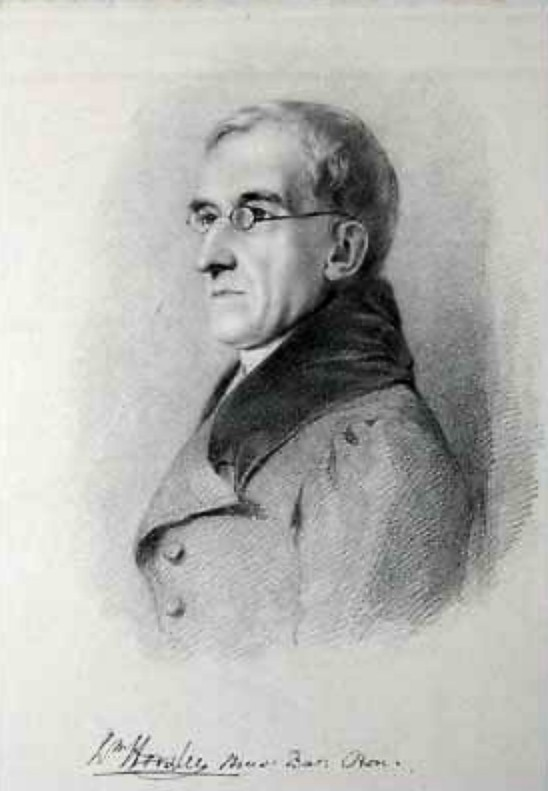
William Horsley

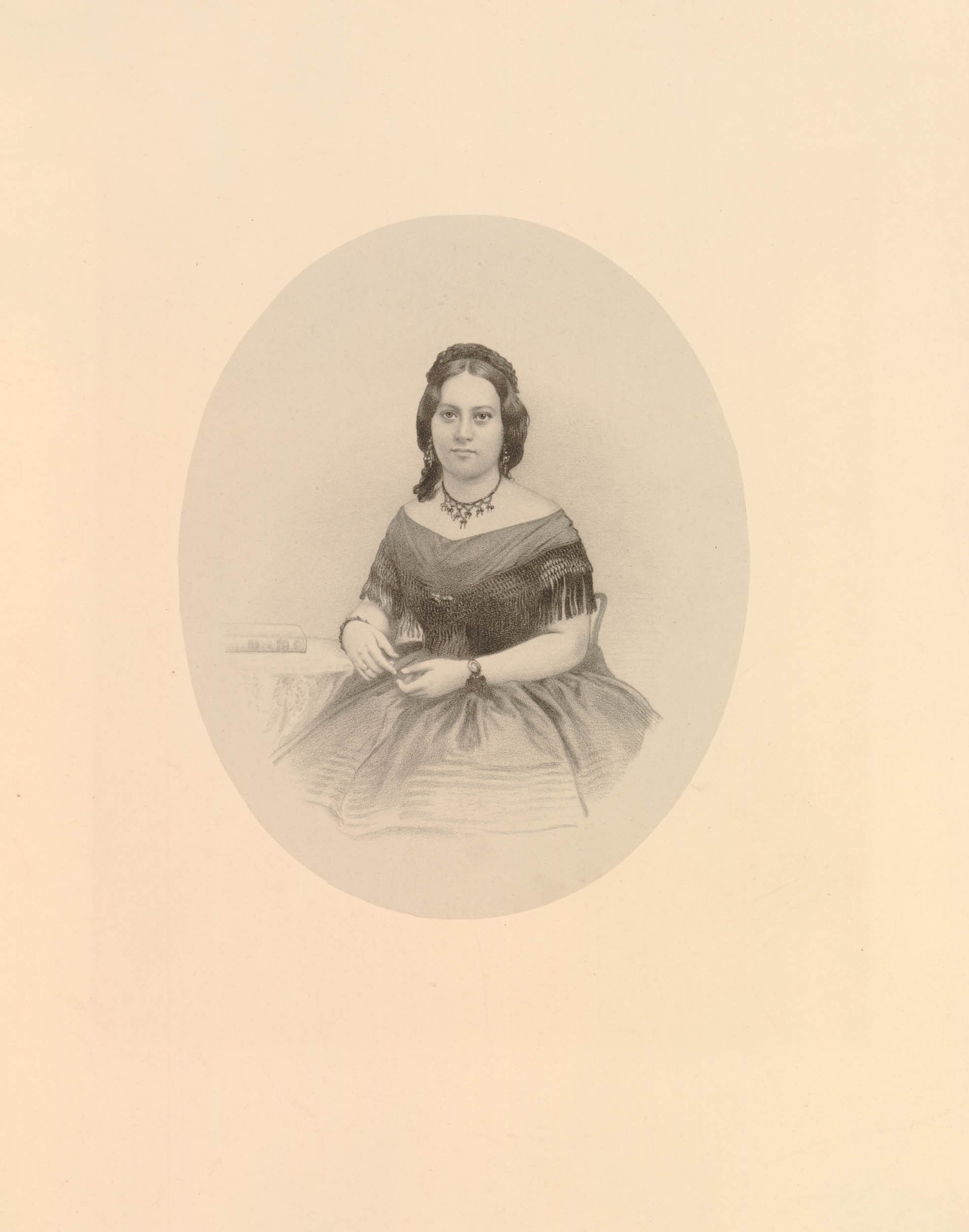
Queen Emma of Hawaii

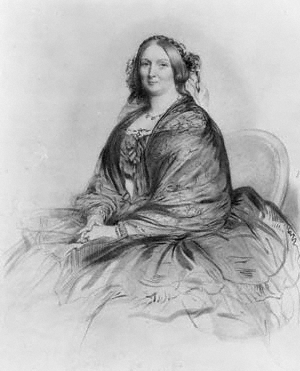
Henrietta Stanley, Baroness Stanley of Alderley

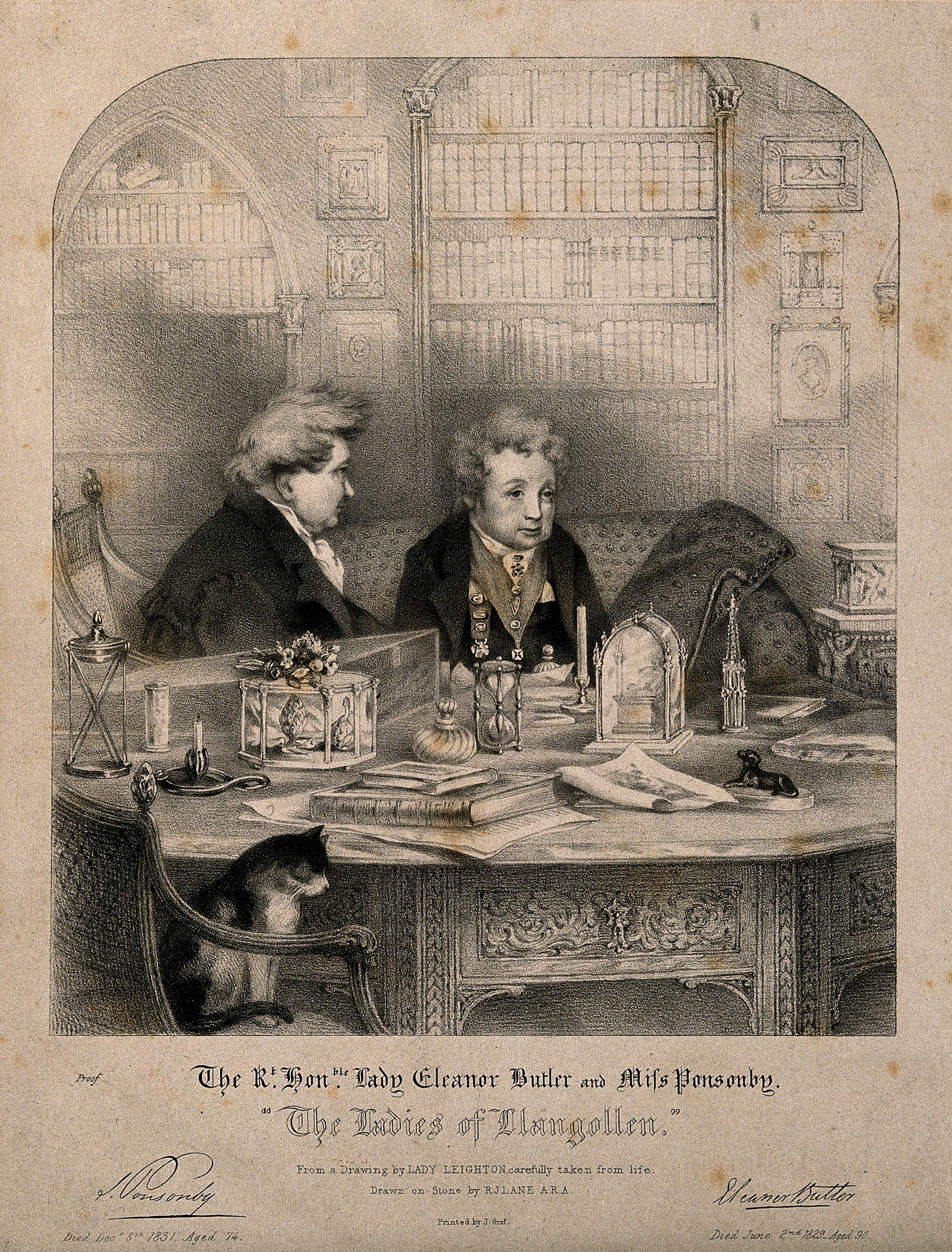
Ladies of Llangollen
