= Edward William Lane =

British orientalist, translator, lexicographer and peacemaker (1801-1876)

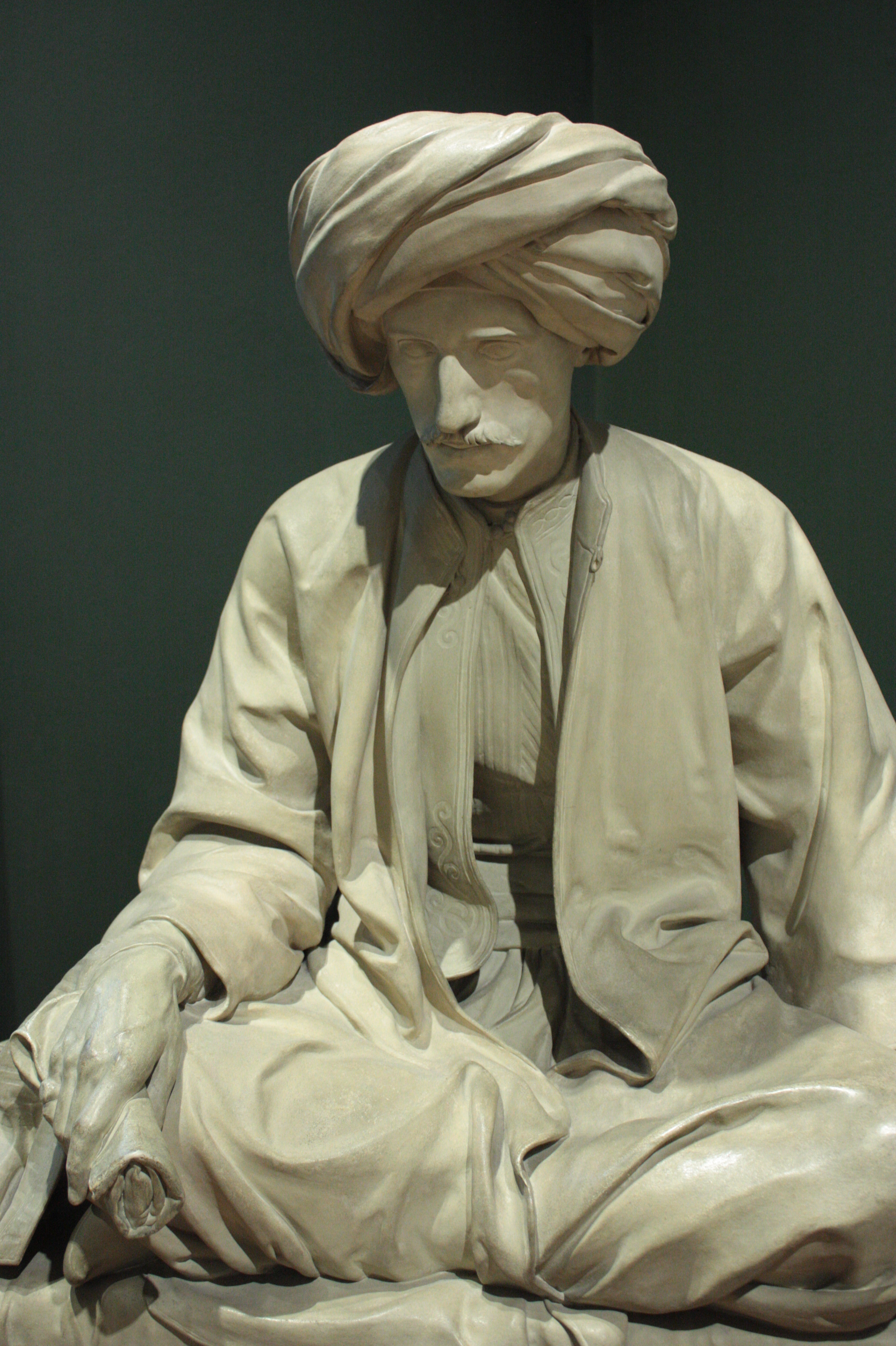
- Lane in an Egyptian outfit, plaster by Richard James Lane
- Born: 17 September 1801; Hereford, England
- Died: 10 August 1876 (aged 74); Broadwater, West Sussex, England
- Known for: Arabic-English Lexicon
- Scientific career
- Fields: Oriental studies

Edward William Lane (17 September 1801 – 10 August 1876) was a British orientalist, translator and lexicographer. He is known for his Manners and Customs of the Modern Egyptians and the Arabic-English Lexicon, as well as his translations of One Thousand and One Nights and Selections from the Kur-án.

During his lifetime, Lane also wrote a detailed account of Egypt and the country's ancient sites, but the book, titled Description of Egypt, was published posthumously. It was first published by the American University in Cairo Press in 2000 and has been republished several times since then.

== Early years ==
Lane was born at Hereford, England, the third son of the Rev. Dr Theophilus Lane, and grand-nephew of Thomas Gainsborough on his mother's side. After his father died in 1814, Lane was sent to grammar school at Bath and then Hereford, where he showed a talent for mathematics. He visited Cambridge but did not enroll in any of its colleges.

Instead, Lane joined his brother Richard in London, studying engraving with him. At the same time, Lane began his study of Arabic on his own. However, his health soon deteriorated. For the sake of his health and of a new career, he set sail to Egypt.

== Work ==
=== Travels in Egypt ===
Lane had a few reasons for travelling to Egypt. He had been studying Arabic for a long period. There had been an explosion of egyptomania in England due to Belzoni's exhibition at the Egyptian Hall and the release of Vivant Denon's Travels in Upper and Lower Egypt during the campaigns of General Bonaparte in that country (1803). Lane's health was also deteriorating while living in London and he felt that he needed to migrate to a warmer climate during the harsh winter months. During the 1800s, those who spoke Arabic and were familiar with the Near East could easily apply for jobs serving the British government. Lane set sail for Egypt on 18 July 1825.

Lane arrived in Alexandria in September 1825 and soon left for Cairo. He remained in Egypt for two and a half years, mingling with the locals, dressed as a Turk (the ethnicity of the then-dominant Ottoman Empire), and taking notes of his experiences and observations. In Old Cairo, he lived near Bab al-Hadid, and studied Arabic with Sheikh Muhammad 'Ayyad al-Tantawi (1810–1861), who was later invited to teach at Saint Petersburg, Russia.

In Egypt, Lane visited coffee shops and the houses of locals, attended a mosque, and familiarized himself with Islam. He also befriended other British travelers in Egypt at that time, including John Gardner Wilkinson, who had been residing in Cairo. Lane also went on a trip down the Nile to Nubia, visiting numerous sites and taking observational notes. On this trip he visited Abydos, Dendera, Luxor, Kom Ombo, Philae, Abu Simbel and a number of other ancient sites. Lane left Egypt on 7 April 1828.

==== Description of Egypt ====
Lane's interest in ancient Egypt may have been first aroused by seeing a presentation by Giovanni Battista Belzoni. His original ambition was to publish an account of what had remained of Ancient Egypt. The London publisher John Murray showed early interest in publishing the project (known as Description of Egypt as an homage to the early 1800s publication, Description de l'Égypte (Note: Lane purportedly did not like the Description de l'Égypte and thought it was very inaccurate. He wanted his Description to be more accurate than the work of his predecessors (Thompson 1996, 567))), but then backed out. This rejection was probably due to the fact that the book had detailed accounts of Egypt, numerous illustrations, and texts in Arabic, Ancient Egyptian (hieroglyphics) and Ancient Greek which would significantly raise the cost of printing. Large publications were also going out of fashion and Lane was not himself an established author. Due to financial shortcomings, Lane could not publish the book himself, so it remained unpublished until 2000.

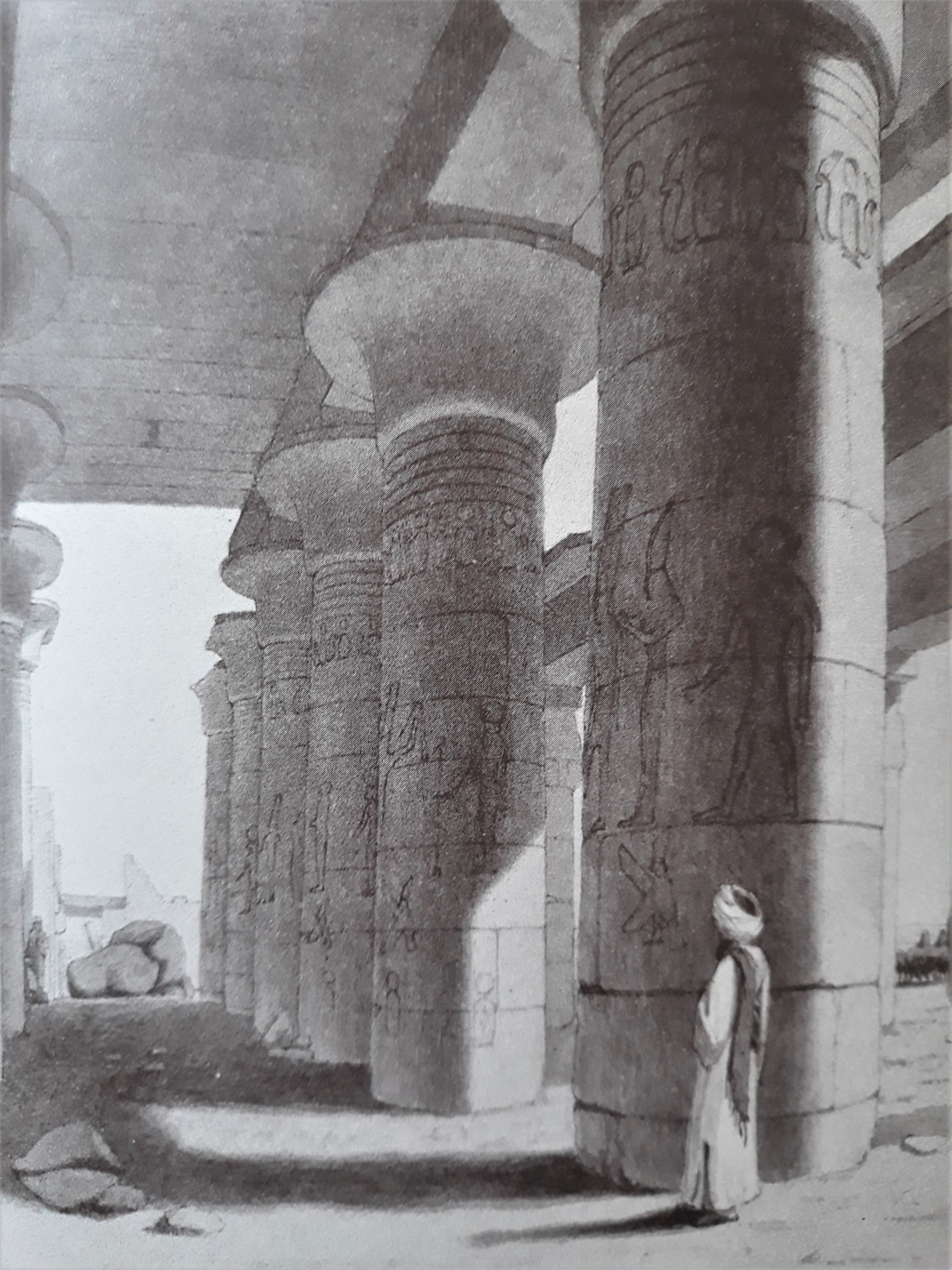
Lane's illustration of the Ramesseum

In Description of Egypt, Lane provided descriptions and histories of locations within Egypt that he had visited. He was a devout urban geographer, best illustrated by the fact that he devoted five chapters of the book writing about everything in Cairo: the way the city looks when you approach it, a detailed account of Old Cairo, monuments in the city, the nature around it, etc. He also wrote about rural areas.

Lane also discussed the landscape and geography of Egypt, including its deserts, the Nile and how it was formed, Egyptian agriculture, and the climate. An entire chapter of the book was devoted to a political history of Egypt, with specific attention to the history of Muhammad Ali of Egypt.

Lane's Description of Egypt focuses mainly on Ancient Egypt. Though Lane was not credited as such during his lifetime, his text follows the form of Egyptology. The book included a supplement titled On the Ancient Egyptians in which Lane discusses the origin and physical characteristics of Egyptians, the origin of their civilization, hieroglyphics, Ancient Egyptian religion and law, Egyptian priesthood, Egyptian royalty, the caste system, general manners and customs, sacred architecture and sculpture, agriculture, and commerce. In a letter he wrote to his friend Harriet Martineau, Lane stated that he felt the need to put a lot of effort into staying away from Ancient Egypt; he added that in the previous eight years he could not read a book on the subject as it fascinated him so much that it drew his attention away from his work.

Lane spent 32 days at the Giza pyramid complex, drawing, making sketches, and taking notes for his work. At the complex Lane noted that he saw labourers pulling down some of the stone from the Great Sphinx of Giza to use it for modern buildings. He stayed at the Valley of the Kings for 15 days, sleeping in the tomb of Ramses X, and left detailed accounts of each tomb, concluding that there may be further hidden tombs within the Valley.

160 illustrations accompanied Lane's accounts.

=== Manners and Customs of the Modern Egyptians ===
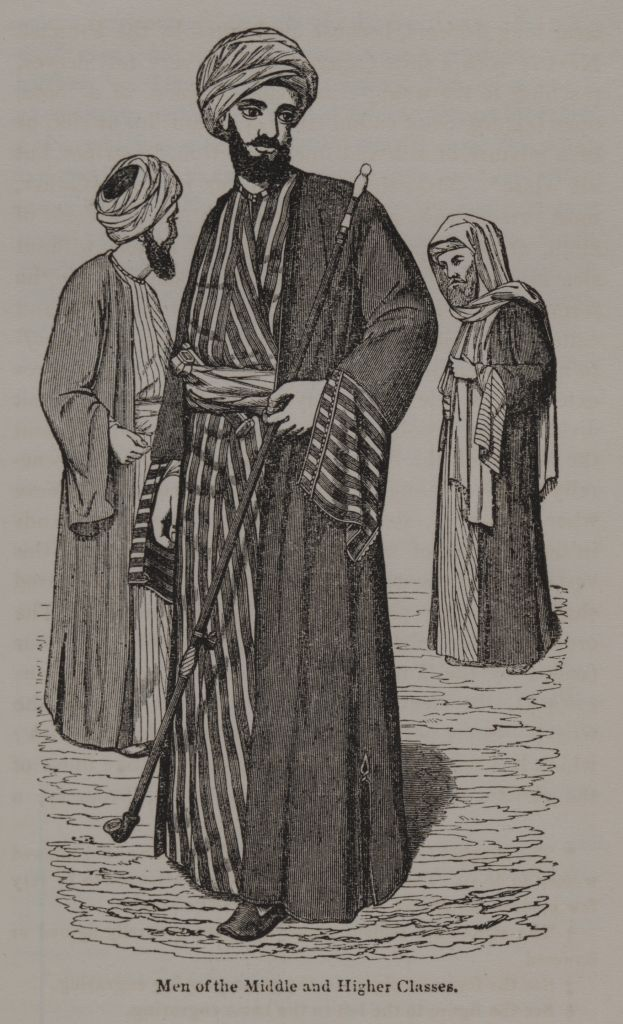
Lane's illustration of middle- and upper-class Egyptian fashions

Since Lane had trouble publishing his Description of Egypt, at the suggestion of John Murray he expanded a chapter of the original project into a separate book. The result was his Manners and Customs of the Modern Egyptians (1836), published by the Society for the Diffusion of Useful Knowledge. The work was partly modelled on Alexander Russell's The Natural History of Aleppo (1756). Lane visited Egypt again in 1833 in order to collect materials to expand and revise the work, after the Society had accepted the publication. The book became a bestseller (still in print), and Lane earned his reputation in the field of Orientalism.

Lane left detailed accounts of everyday life in Egypt in the 19th century, which would prove useful to later researchers. Arthur John Arberry visited Egypt a century after Lane and said that it was like visiting another planet - none of the things Lane had written about were present.

Lane was conscious that his research was handicapped by the fact that gender segregation prevented him from getting a close-up view of Egyptian women - an aspect of Egyptian life that was of particular interest to his readers. He was forced to rely on information passed on by Egyptian men, as he explains:

Many husbands of the middle classes, and some of the higher orders, freely talk of the affairs of the ḥareem with one who professes to agree with them in their general moral sentiments, if they have not to converse through the medium of an interpreter.

However, in order to gain further information, he would later send for his sister, Sophia Lane Poole, so that she could gain access to women-only areas such as hareems and bathhouses and report on what she found. The result was The Englishwoman in Egypt: Letters from Cairo, written during a residence there in 1842, 3 & 4, with E.W. Lane Esq., Author of "The Modern Egyptians" By His Sister. (Poole's own name does not appear within the publication.) The Englishwoman in Egypt contains large sections of Lane's own unpublished work, altered so that it appears to be from Poole's perspective (for example "my brother" being substituted for "I"). However, it also relates Poole's own experiences in visiting the hareems that were closed to male visitors.

=== The One Thousand and One Nights ===
Lane's next major project was a translation of the One Thousand and One Nights. His version first saw light as a monthly serial from 1838 to 1840, and was published in three volumes in 1840. A revised edition was released in 1859. The encyclopedic annotations from the first edition were published posthumously and separately in 1883 by his great-nephew Stanley Lane-Poole, as Arabian Society in the Middle Ages. Lane's version is bowdlerized, and illustrated by William Harvey.

Opinions vary on the quality of Lane's translation. Stanley Lane-Poole commented that "Lane's version is markedly superior to any other that has appeared in English, if superiority is allowed to be measured by accuracy and an honest and unambitious desire to reproduce the authentic spirit as well as the letter of the original." Nights researcher and author Robert Irwin writes that Lane's "style tends towards the grandiose and mock-biblical... Word order is frequently and pointlessly inverted. Where the style is not pompously high-flown, it is often painfully and uninspiringly literal... It is also peppered with Latinisms."

Lane himself saw the Nights as an edifying work, as he had expressed earlier in a note in his preface to the Manners and Customs,

There is one work, however, which represents most admirable pictures of the manners and customs of the Arabs, and particularly of those of the Egyptians; it is 'The Thousand and One Nights; or, Arabian Nights' Entertainments:' if the English reader had possessed a close translation of it with sufficient illustrative notes, I might almost have spared myself the labour of the present undertaking.

=== Dictionary and other works ===
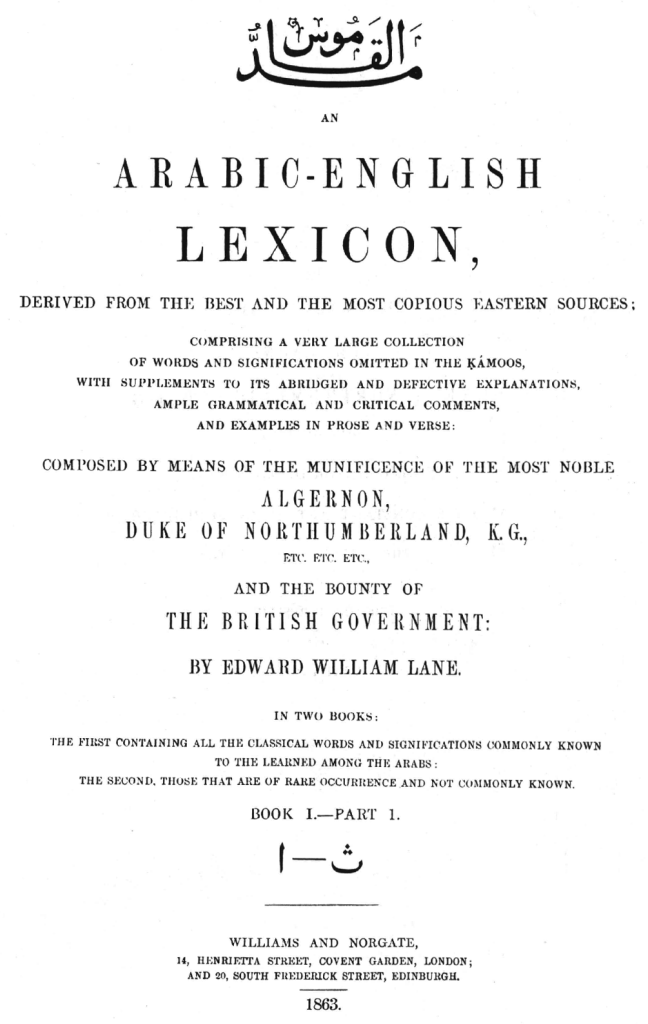
Title page of the first volume of the Arabic-English Lexicon

From 1842 onwards, Lane devoted himself to the monumental Arabic-English Lexicon, although he found time to contribute several articles to the journal of Deutsche Morgenländische Gesellschaft. He went to Egypt in 1842 with his wife, two children, and his sister Sophia Lane Poole who was working on her book The Englishwoman in Egypt. On this occasion Lane stayed in Egypt for 7 years, working six days a week on his Lexicon. A local scholar, Ibrahim al-Disqui, helped him with this work. Al-Disqui assisted in locating manuscripts and proofreading these manuscripts for Lane. The two became close during this period and continued to stay friends after they finished the Lexicon.

According to Manfred Ullmann, Lane’s dictionary was of extremely poor quality, as he explained:

The Arabic-English Lexicon [sc. by E. Lane] is the work of an autodidact and private scholar, who did not have any knowledge of the Arabic literature worth mentioning. … Lane clearly never read the dīwān (collection) of any poet, nor any prose work apart from the Arabian Nights. … The work … stops with the letter qāf. … But even the volumes comprising the letters alif to fāʾ are incomplete, since Lane omitted unusual roots and words, which he planned to supply in a ‘second part’, which never appeared. … In the end, Lane’s Lexicon is only a ‌Tāǧ al-ʿarūs translated into English. … He simply copied exactly — but without any critical discernment — the materials found in the Arabic dictionaries; he omitted the grammatical construction of the verbs; and he failed to provide references to the literary sources. This means that Lane’s dictionary marks a significant step backwards compared with the works of his predecessors [sc. such as Golius and Freytag].

Lane's Selections from the Qur'an appeared in 1843. It was neither a critical nor a commercial success. Moreover, it was misprint-ridden as Lane was for the third time in Egypt with his family collecting materials for the Arabic-English Lexicon when it was being printed.

Lane was unable to complete his dictionary. He had arrived at the letter Qāf, the 21st letter of the Arabic alphabet, but in 1876 he died at Worthing, Sussex. Lane's great-nephew Stanley Lane-Poole finished the work based on his incomplete notes and published it in the twenty years following his death.

In 1854, an anonymous work entitled The Genesis of the Earth and of Man was published, edited by Lane's nephew Reginald Stuart Poole. The work is attributed by some to Lane.

The part concerning Cairo's early history and topography in Description of Egypt, based on Al-Maqrizi's work and Lane's own observations, was revised by Reginald Stuart Poole in 1847 and published in 1896 as Cairo Fifty Years Ago.

== Criticism ==
Lane has been criticized for his particularly unsympathetic description of Egypt's Coptic Christian minority, drawn in part from the words of an Egyptian man who presented himself to Lane as a Copt, although other scholars have reported that the interlocutor was, in fact, a Muslim. In his writings, he describes Copts as "of a sullen temper, extremely avaricious, and abominable dissemblers; cringing or domineering according to circumstances. Scholars such as S.H. Leeder have described "a great deal of the morbid prejudice against the Copts" as being inspired by the writings of Lane.

== Personal life ==
Lane was from a notable Orientalist family. His sister, Sophia Lane Poole, was an Oriental scholar, as was his nephew Reginald Stuart Poole. His brother, Richard James Lane, was a notable Victorian-era engraver and lithographer known for his portraits. In 1840, Lane married Nafeesah, a Greek-Egyptian woman who had originally been either presented to him or purchased by him as a slave when she was around eight years old, and whom he had undertaken to educate. In 1867, after the death of his sister's son Edward Stanley Poole, she and Lane raised his three orphaned children, a daughter and two sons, Stanley Lane-Poole (also an orientalist and archaeologist) and Reginald Lane Poole (a historian and archivist).

Lane died on 10 August 1876 and was buried at West Norwood Cemetery. His manuscripts and drawings are in the archive of the Griffith Institute, University of Oxford.

== See also ==
- Orientalism
- Orientalism (book) by Edward Said
- Oriental studies

== Biographies ==
- Ahmed, Leila (1978). Edward W Lane. London: Longman.
- Lane-Poole, Stanley (1877). Life of Edward William Lane. London: Williams and Norgate.
- Thompson, Jason (2010). Edward William Lane: The Life of the Pioneering Egyptologist and Orientalist, 1801-1876. Cairo: American University in Cairo Press.
