= Arabic–English Lexicon =

Arabic–English dictionary

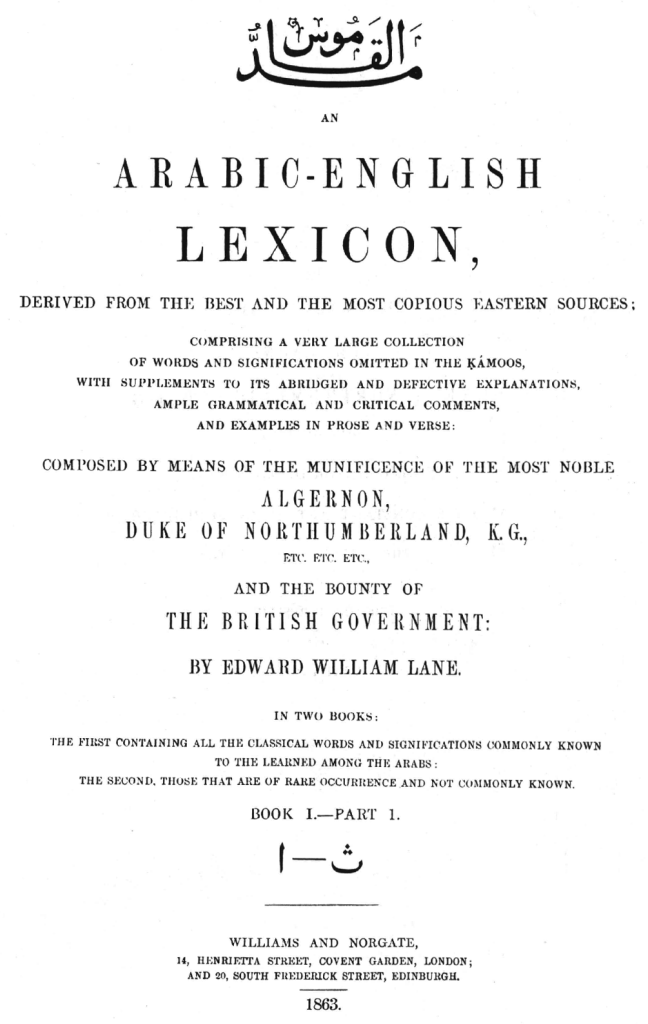
Title page of the first volume

The Arabic–English Lexicon is an Arabic–English dictionary compiled by Edward William Lane (died 1876). It was published in eight volumes during the second half of the 19th century. It consists of Arabic words defined and explained in the English language. But Lane does not use his own knowledge of Arabic to give definitions to the words. Instead, the definitions are taken from older Arabic dictionaries, primarily medieval Arabic dictionaries. Lane translates these definitions into English, and he carefully notes which dictionaries are giving which definitions.

== History ==
In 1842, Lane, who had already won fame as an Arabist for his Manners and Customs of the Modern Egyptians and his version of the One Thousand and One Nights, received a sponsorship from Lord Prudhoe, later Duke of Northumberland, to compile an Arabic–English dictionary.

Lane set to work at once, making his third voyage to Cairo to collect materials in the same year. Since the Muslim scholars there were reluctant to lend manuscripts to Lane, the acquisition of materials was commissioned to Ibrahim Al-Dasuqi (1811–1883), a graduate of Azhar and a teacher in Boulaq. In order to collect and collate the materials, Lane stayed in Cairo for seven years, working arduously with little rest and recreation. The acquisition of materials, which took 13 years, was left in the hands of Al-Dasuqi when Lane returned to England in 1849.

Back to England, Lane continued to work on the dictionary with zeal, complaining that he was so used to the cursive calligraphy of his Arabic manuscripts that the Western print strained his eyes. He had arrived at the letter Qāf, the 21st letter of the Arabic alphabet, when he died in 1876.

Lane's lexicon is based on medieval Arabic dictionaries plus the dictionary Taj al-ʿArus ("Crown of the Bride") by al-Zabidi which was completed in the early 19th century. In total, 112 lexicographic sources are cited in the work.

The lexicon was designed to consist of two "Books" or Divisions: one for the common, classical words, another for the rare ones. Volume I of the First Division was published in 1863; Volume II in 1865; Volume III in 1867; Volumes IV and V in 1872. A total of 2,219 pages were proofread by Lane himself. Lane's great-nephew Stanley Lane-Poole published Volumes VI, VII and VIII from 1877 to 1893 using Lane's incomplete notes left behind him. Those later volumes are sketchy and full of gaps. In total, the First Division comprises 3,064 pages. Nothing has come out of the planned Second Division. Thus the work has never been completed.

According to Manfred Ullmann, Lane’s dictionary was of extremely poor quality, as he explained:

The Arabic-English Lexicon [sc. by E. Lane] is the work of an autodidact and private scholar, who did not have any knowledge of the Arabic literature worth mentioning. … Lane clearly never read the dīwān (collection) of any poet, nor any prose work apart from the Arabian Nights. … The work … stops with the letter qāf. … But even the volumes comprising the letters alif to fāʾ are incomplete, since Lane omitted unusual roots and words, which he planned to supply in a ‘second part’, which never appeared. … In the end, Lane’s Lexicon is only a ‌Tāǧ al-ʿarūs translated into English. … He simply copied exactly — but without any critical discernment — the materials found in the Arabic dictionaries; he omitted the grammatical construction of the verbs; and he failed to provide references to the literary sources. This means that Lane’s dictionary marks a significant step backwards compared with the works of his predecessors [sc. such as Golius and Freytag].

Lane's work focuses on classical vocabulary, thus later scholars found it necessary to compile supplements to the work for post-classical usage, such as the Supplément aux dictionnaires arabes (1881; 2nd ed., 1927) by the Dutch Arabist Reinhart Dozy; also, the Wörterbuch der klassischen arabischen Sprache, being published from 1970 onwards by the Deutsche Morgenländische Gesellschaft, starts from Kāf, thus supplementing Lane's work in effect.

The first draft of the lexicon, as well as the whole Taj al-ʿArus copied by Al-Dasuqi for Lane in 24 volumes, are now preserved in the British Library. The Lane's lexicon became available online

== Bibliographic details ==
- Edward William Lane, An Arabic–English Lexicon, vols 6–8 ed. by Stanley Lane-Poole, 8 vols (London: Williams and Norgate, 1863–93).

== Editions ==
- Digitisation at quranic-research.net
- Arabic–English Lexicon: Downloadable in eight volumes – when downloaded in the DjVu fileformat, the English text is searchable, the Arabic text is not searchable.
- Arabic–English Lexicon: Root words accessible online through a clickable list
- 1992. Cambridge, UK: Islamic Texts Society. 2 volumes. ISBN 0-946621-03-9.
- 1980/1997. Beirut, Lebanon: Librairie du Liban. 8 volumes.
- 2003. New Delhi, India: Asian Educational Services. 8 volumes. ISBN 81-206-0107-6.
- 2004. AramediA. CD-ROM. ASIN 3908153557.
- Year unknown. Lahore, Pakistan: Suhail Academy. 2 volumes (reprint of ITS ed.). ISBN 978-969-519-049-4.
- 2015. Qum, Iran: Entekhab, 1436 AH/ 1394 Sh/ 2015. 4 volumes. (With two prefaces in English and Persian by the contemporary Iranian academic, scholar, and translator, Dr. Muhammad-Reza Fakhr-Rohani).

== See also ==
- List of most expensive books and manuscripts

== Notes and references ==
- Arberry, A.J. (1960). Oriental Essays. London: George Allen & Unwin.
- Irwin, Robert (2006). For Lust of Knowing. London: Allen Lane.
- Roper, Geoffrey (1998). "Texts from Nineteenth-Century Egypt: The Role of E. W. Lane", in Paul and Janet Starky (eds) Travellers in Egypt, London; New York: I.B. Tauris, pp. 244–254.
