= Ruth Lane Poole =

Irish-Australian furniture and interior designer

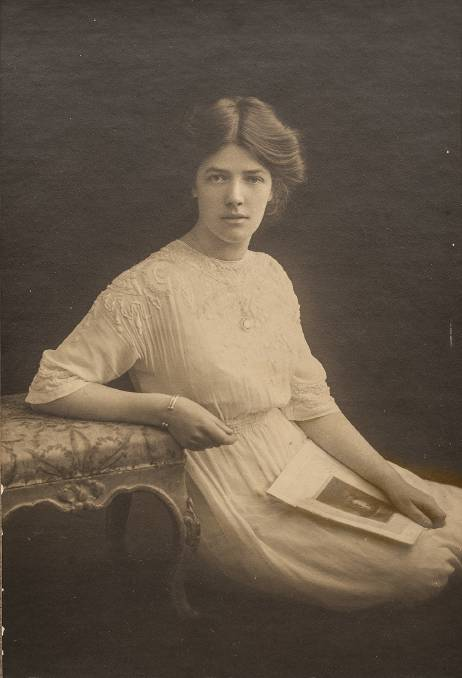
- Lane Poole c. 1911
- Born: Ruth Johnstone Pollexfen; 27 September 1885; Limerick, Ireland
- Died: 11 October 1974 (aged 89); Sydney, Australia
- Occupations: Furniture and interior designer
- Spouse: Charles Lane Poole (m. 1911; died 1970)
- Relatives: Susan Pollexfen (aunt); W. B. Yeats (cousin); Lily Yeats (cousin); Lollie Yeats (cousin)

Ruth Lane Poole (born Ruth Johnstone Pollexfen; 27 September 1885 – 11 October 1974) was an Irish-Australian furniture and interior designer. She notably designed the original interiors of The Lodge and Yarralumla, the official residences of the prime minister and governor-general of Australia.

Lane Poole was born in Ireland, a cousin of poet W. B. Yeats and his sisters Lily and Lollie. She came under Lily's guardianship as a teenager and joined the sisters in their Celtic Revival efforts at Dun Emer Press and Cuala Industries, where she was known for her embroidery work. In 1911 she married English-born forester Charles Lane Poole, with whom she had three children.

Lane Poole first moved to Australia in 1916, living in Western Australia where her husband was appointed conservator of forests. She returned to Ireland in 1922, but settled in Australia permanently in 1925 when Charles was appointed as an adviser to the federal government. In 1926, Lane Poole was commissioned by the Federal Capital Commission to design the interiors of the residences of the prime minister and governor-general in the new capital city Canberra.

== Early life ==
Lane Poole was born on 27 September 1885 in Limerick, Ireland. She was the third of nine children born to Henrietta (née Johnstone) and Frederick Pollexfen. Her father was the brother of Susan Pollexfen, mother of Irish poet W. B. Yeats.

In 1900, Lane Poole's parents separated and she became a ward of her cousin Lily Yeats in London. She returned to Ireland in 1902 with Lily and her sister Lollie, joining them in their promotion of Celtic Revival arts and crafts. She served as an apprentice to Lily in the embroidery section of the Dun Emer Press, and later gave lessons at the sisters' Cuala Industries. She continued to design embroideries for Cuala until the early 1920s when she permanently moved to Australia. A collection of her embroidery is held by the National Gallery of Ireland.

== Marriage and children ==
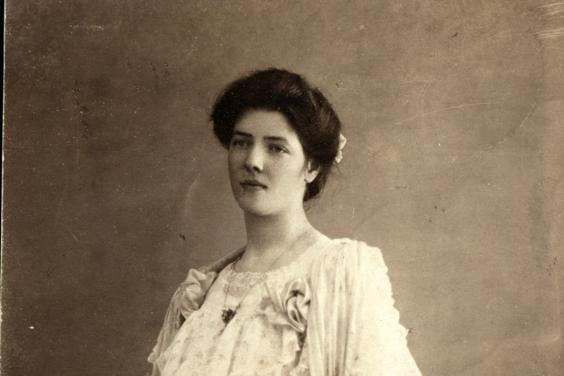
Lane Poole in 1904

In 1911, Lane Poole married English-born forester Charles Lane Poole, the son of archaeologist Stanley Lane Poole. They were married at the chapel of St Columba's College, Dublin, where she was given away by her cousin W. B. Yeats. The first years of their marriage were marked by long periods of separation, as she remained in Ireland while he worked overseas in British Sierra Leone. The couple had three daughters: Charlotte (born 1913 in London), Mary (born 1918 in Perth), and Phyllis (born 1922 in Ireland).

== Australia ==
In 1916, Lane Poole and her husband moved to Perth, Western Australia, where he had been appointed conservator of forests. She began to develop an appreciation of Australian native timbers, and in 1920 was tasked with choosing a selection of Western Australian timbers to be presented to Edward, Prince of Wales, on his tour of Western Australia. She returned to Ireland in 1922 with her daughters, again living apart from her husband while he worked in Papua and New Guinea.

Lane Poole and her daughters returned to Australia in 1925, where her husband had been appointed as Commonwealth Forestry Adviser. They initially lived in Melbourne, the country's interim capital, where their social circle included architect Harold Desbrowe-Annear, philanthropist Russell Grimwade, and artists Thea Proctor, Ethel Spowers and Blamire Young. Shortly after their arrival, Lane Poole was commissioned to develop a model bedroom for the Arts and Crafts Society of Victoria's annual exhibition at the Melbourne Town Hall, which was opened by the prime minister's wife Ethel Bruce. Her model bedroom attracted praise for its "refined period style furniture made in Australian timbers, her sense of colour and her exquisite embroidery", and she was soon invited to contribute to Table Talk and Home Beautiful.

=== Official designer ===
In March 1926, Lane Poole was appointed by the National Capital Commission (NCC) to design the interiors of the new official residences for the governor-general and prime minister of Australia, in time for the planned relocation of federal parliament to the new capital city of Canberra. She was given a budget of £10,000 (equivalent to $900,000 in 2022) for Yarralumla, the governor-general's residence, and a budget of £5,000 (equivalent to $450,000 in 2022) for The Lodge, the prime minister's residence. Lane Poole found the initial budget to be insufficient and lobbied the federal cabinet for additional funding, which agreed only after she threatened to resign. Her own remuneration was set at three guineas per day (equivalent to $283 in 2022), plus a travel allowance.

Lane Poole's mandate covered every room in the houses and included design work, such as interior colour schemes and designing furniture, alongside procurement of materials and supervision of furniture-making. She was also responsible for all napery, glassware and tableware and even finer details such as light switches and bell pulls. In addition to her official role, Lane Poole also worked as an unofficial publicist for the NCC, promoting Canberra in her columns in Melbourne newspapers and journals. Her articles were often illustrated with photographs from government sources.

=== Later life ===
Lane Poole was later appointed by the Myer Emporium in Melbourne as a consultant on interior furnishings. She and her family moved to Canberra in 1928, where her husband had been appointed inaugural principal of the Australian Forestry School. She did not design again professionally, but was an "ardent promoter of Canberra and took a prominent role in developing the city’s cultural and social life". Lane Poole and her husband developed a friendship with Governor-General Lord Stonehaven and his wife.

Lane Poole and her husband retired to Sydney in 1945. She was widowed in 1970 and died on 11 October 1974, aged 89.

== Design style and legacy ==
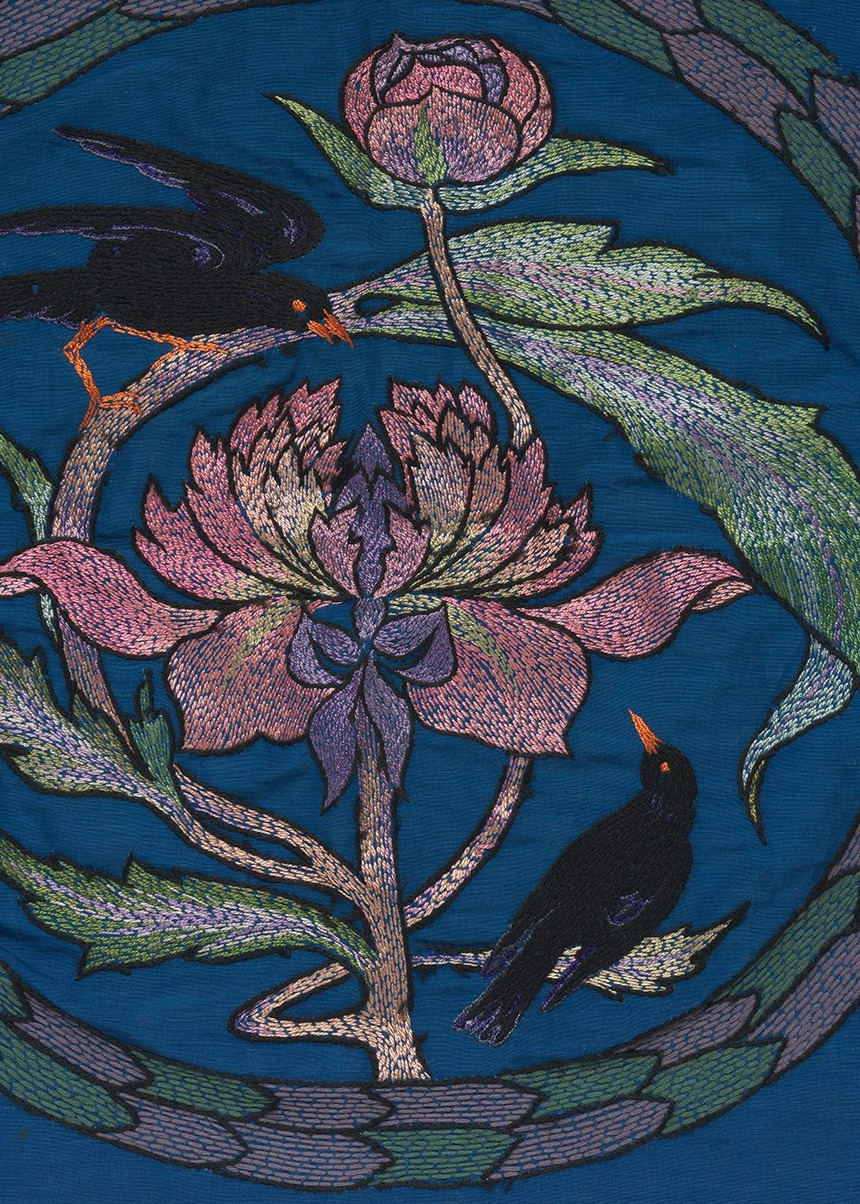
Detail of a cushion cover featuring a design of blackbirds and peonies, designed by Lily Yeats and embroidered by Lane Poole

Lane Poole's design aesthetic was "grounded in the English traditions of historical period styles, the Arts and Crafts movement's rejection of industrialisation and her family associations with leading proponents of the Celtic Revival". She had a strong preference for Australian native timber.

Lane Poole's interiors at The Lodge were eventually superseded as prime ministers' wives implemented their own design aesthetics. In the 1980s, Hazel Hawke restored some of Lane Poole's original pieces, which had been retained in storage by the federal government. These included a Beale baby grand piano commissioned by Lane Poole in Queensland maple. In 2021, the Canberra Museum and Gallery staged an exhibition of her work titled Ruth Lane Poole: A Woman of Influence. The exhibition included furniture from the official residences along with personal items highlighting "the development of Ruth's design philosophy and the legacy of her Irish associations, as well as her love for Australian timbers".

== Sources ==
- Betteridge, Margaret (2021). Ruth Lane-Poole: A Woman of Influence. Canberra Museum and Gallery.
