= Henry Symeonis =

Englishman; target of a University of Oxford grudge

Henry Symeonis (fl. 1225–1264) was a wealthy Englishman from Oxford who became the target of a c. 550-year-long grudge at the University of Oxford. Until 1827, Oxford graduates had to swear an oath never to be reconciled with Henry Symeonis despite Oxford apparently having forgotten by the 17th century who he was or what he did. His identity was only rediscovered in 1912.

== Biography ==
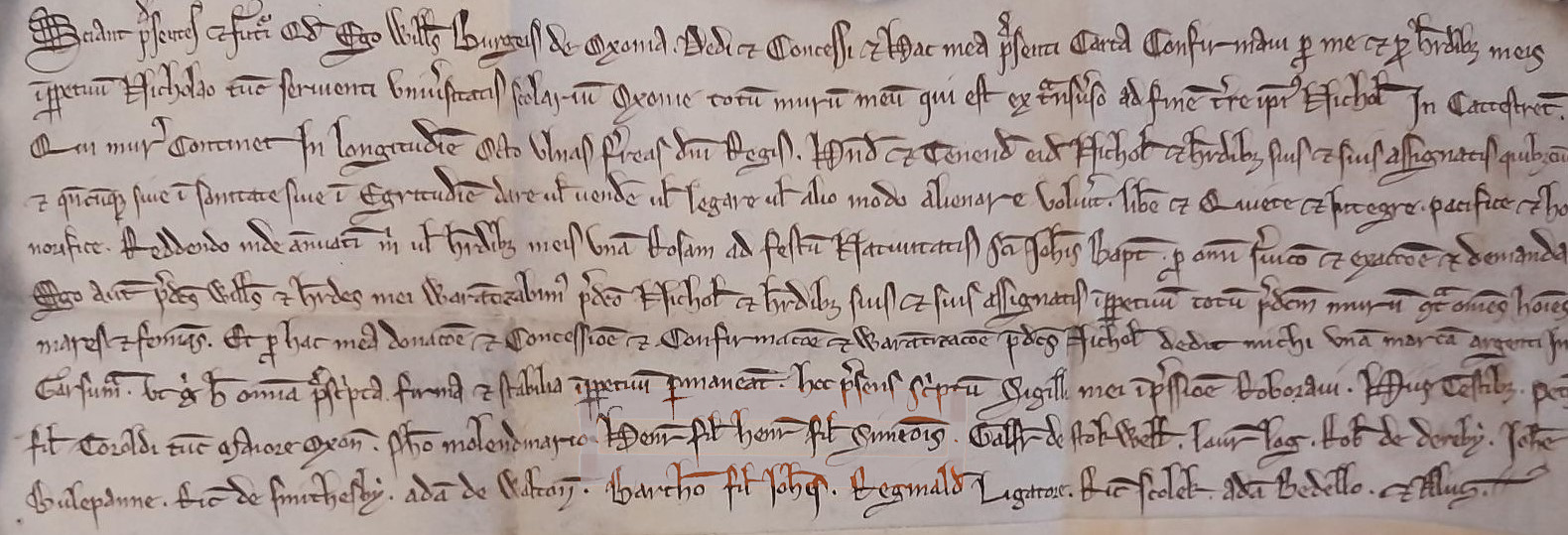
Henry Symeonis appears as a witness of a boundary wall grant in 1243.

Henry was the son of Henry, son of Symeon, from whom the patronymic surname is derived. Symeon was a witness to royal charters and possibly one of the reeves of Oxford during the reign of King John. Symeon's son, Henry, was one of the richest men in early 13th-century Oxford. Henry, son of Henry and grandson of Symeon, first appears in 1225. He, too, was rich and owned multiple properties in the city.

Henry Symeonis was among the men who, on 22 May 1242, were fined £80 and ordered to leave Oxford by King Henry III for murdering an Oxford scholar. They were allowed to stay in Northampton or further north, but were not to approach Oxford until the king returned from Aquitaine. The king returned to England later that year and Henry Symeonis was apparently in Oxford in early 1243. He sold an island to the king, who in 1245 granted it to the Order of Friars Minor.

In 1264, many scholars left Oxford, and King Henry also temporarily suspended the operation of the university on 12 March 1264. On 25 March 1264, King Henry issued letters patent declaring that Henry Symeonis had been forgiven and ordering the university to let him live in Oxford in peace so long as he should show good behaviour. Oxford archivists give differing interpretations of this episode. Reginald Lane Poole argued in the early 20th century that the exodus of the scholars from Oxford was in protest over Henry Symeonis's return. But archive and records manager Alice Millea noted in 2023 that Henry Symeonis had returned years earlier. According to Millea, King Henry suspended the university because Oxford had become the centre of military operations during the Second Barons' War. Millea concludes that Henry Symeonis bought the king's pardon, but later that year the king was imprisoned as part of his ongoing conflict with the barons, and the Oxford scholars ignored his order to be reconciled.

== Oath ==
Magister, tu jurabis quod nunquam consenties in reconciliationem Henrici Simeonis, nec statum Baccalaurei iterum tibi assumes.

[Master, you shall swear that you will never consent to the reconciliation of Henry Simeon, nor will you assume again the status of Bachelor.]

— Oath taken by Oxford students, Corpus Statutorum (Statute Tit VII section 1. 5)

The University of Oxford incorporated the hostility towards Henry Symeonis in its statutes. Until 1827, all Bachelors of Arts (BAs) who sought to become Masters of Arts had to swear an oath never to be reconciled with Henry Symeonis. The statutes did not explain who Henry Symeonis was or what he had done. The archivist Brian Twyne wrote in his 1608 book Antiquitatis Academiae Oxon Apologia that Henry Symeonis was a Regent in Arts who falsely claimed to be a BA in order to enroll in a foreign monastery, but Twyne did not cite any sources.

In the 17th century, antiquary Anthony Wood reported that the removal of the oath referring to Henry Symeonis was proposed and rejected, for reasons he does not mention, during the University of Oxford's review of the statutes in 1651–52. Alice Millea of Oxford's Bodleian Library wrote in 2023 that she presumes that by that time the oath's origin and meaning had already been forgotten, replaced by legends and myths. The oath was finally abolished in February 1827, possibly "because nobody knew exactly what they were abolishing". The English bishop Christopher Wordsworth, who called the oath "quaintly personal", wrote in 1874: "It is thought that the culprit had, to gain some end, dissembled his degree in king John's reign."

Millea calls the university's c. 550-year-long grudge against Henry Symeonis "a very strange example of the longevity of some University customs, long after they've lost relevance or meaning". It has also been cited as an example of why ancient rules should be critically reviewed, and not simply continued because they exist. Details about the identity of Henry Symeonis were not rediscovered until 1912 by Oxford's keeper of the archives, Reginald Lane Poole.
