= Bendora Arboretum =

Arboretum in the Australian Capital Territory

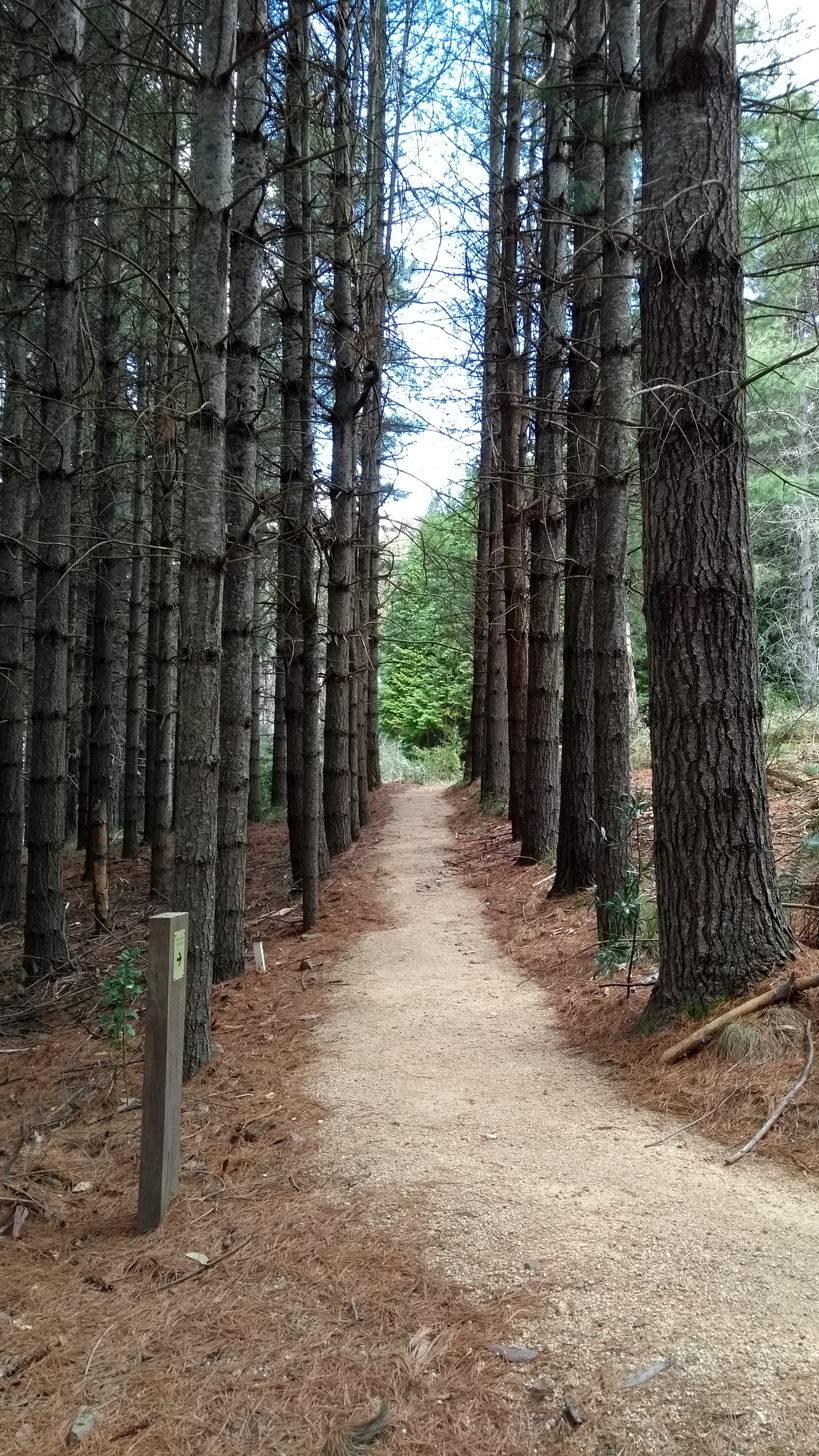
- Interactive map of Bendora Arboretum
- Type: Arboretum
- Location: Namadgi National Park
- Coordinates: 35°25′24″S 148°47′50″E
- Created: 1940

The Bendora Arboretum is an arboretum in the Australian Capital Territory located within Namadgi National Park. It was established in 1940 by Dr Charles Lane Poole, Director of the then Forestry and Timber Bureau as one of a series of experimental plantings to help determine which commercial species of trees should be grown in the Canberra district.

It consists of fifty-two species of trees laid out in 9 x 9 blocks (81 trees per block). It survived the Canberra bushfires of 2003. It is listed on the Heritage Places Register of the ACT. The name of the Arboretum was made up by Lane Poole in 1940. It is not an Aboriginal name as some believe.

Today the Arboretum is visited by bushwalkers, with signage describing the history of the site and botanical significance of the trees. A picnic table located in the centre of the Arboretum makes it a popular place for picnics.
