= Rachael Poole =

British art historian (1860 – 1937)

Rachael Emily Lane Poole FSA (née Malleson; June 13, 1860, London – April 9, 1937, Oxford) was an historian of portraiture, with a particular focus on miniatures, active in the United Kingdom. She played a key part in cataloguing local and university artwork and architecture in Oxford.

Her most important work was the three volume Catalogue of Oxford Portraits (1919–1925). She also wrote An Outline of the History of the De Critz Family of Painters (published by the Walpole Society in 1912), which included important work on Cornelius de Neve. She published articles on portraitists active in Tudor England, such as Marcus Gheeraerts (both the Elder and the Younger), who came to England from the Netherlands, as well as seventeenth-century sculptor Edward Pierce.

She played an active, if voluntary, role in the life of Oxford University, and beyond her research efforts, was a founding member of the Bach Choir and served on the council of the Association for Promoting the Education of Women at Oxford.

For her academic work, she was elected a fellow of the Society of Antiquaries in 1926 and received an honorary MA from Oxford in 1932.

== Family ==
She married Oxford historian and archivist Reginald Lane-Poole and was the mother of Austin Lane Poole. Their daughter, Dorothy Joy Lane Poole, a pupil and friend of Lewis Carroll, became a classics tutor for the Society of Oxford Home Students.
