= Charles Lane Poole =

English-Australian forester (1885–1970)

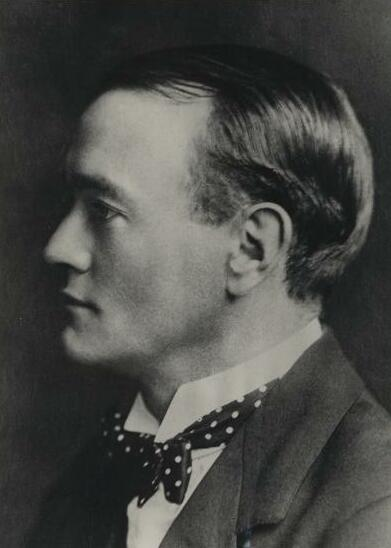
- Born: 16 August 1885; Easebourne, Sussex, England
- Died: 22 November 1970 (aged 85); Sydney, New South Wales
- Education: French National School of Forestry, 1906; South African School of Forestry, 1907.
- Known for: Scientific Forestry
- Spouse: Ruth Pollexfen (m. 1911)
- Scientific career
- Workplaces: Transvaal, Sierra Leone, Western Australia, Papua, New Guinea, Melbourne, Canberra, Sydney
- Author abbrev. (botany): Lane-Poole

Charles Edward Lane Poole (16 August 1885 – 22 November 1970) was an English Australian forester who introduced systematic, science-based forestry practices to various parts of the Commonwealth, most notably Australia.

== Biography ==
=== Early life and education in Europe (1885–1906) ===
Poole was born on 16 August 1885 in Easebourne, Sussex, England, the youngest son of Stanley Lane-Poole, an Egyptologist, and his wife Charlotte. His brother Richard was a senior officer in the Royal Navy. In 1900 his father took up a professorship at Trinity College Dublin, moving the family with him, and Lane Poole began attending school at St Columba's College the next year. He then undertook an engineering course, but dropped out after losing his left hand in a shooting accident. He switched to forestry science, graduating from the French National School of Forestry in 1906.

=== Africa (1906–1916) ===
After Lane Poole's graduation from the French National School of Forestry, the British government sent him to what is now South Africa, where he initially spent a year at the South African Forest School. He began working as a forest officer in Transvaal in May 1907, and was then appointed as District Forest Officer at Woodbush Forest, near Haenertsburg. He resigned from this position in June 1910, citing disagreement with the government's policies. In November 1910 he was posted as a forest officer to Sierra Leone. While on leave in Dublin in July 1911, he married Ruth Pollexfen, an Irish-born embroiderer and furniture designer who later designed the interiors of The Lodge and Government House in Canberra, and was a cousin of W. B. Yeats. She stayed in Ireland when he returned to Sierra Leone, where he became the Conservator of Forests and a member of the Legislative Council, among other things establishing the forestry department and setting up the first forest reserves.

=== Western Australia (1916–1921) ===
In 1916, Lane Poole was appointed as Western Australia's Conservator of Forests, and moved to the Perth suburb of Cottesloe with his wife and daughter in their first home together. He formulated the Forests Act (1918), established a new Forests Department, and began long-term planning for sustainable use of timber. In Ludlow, he set up a forestry settlement along with Ludlow Forestry School (1921–1927), the first forestry school in Western Australia. When the Western Australian authorities would not heed his advice, he resigned in protest in 1921. Shortly afterwards, Ruth returned to Ireland with the couple's two daughters.

=== Papua and New Guinea (1921–1925) ===
The Australian timber industry pressured the national government to hire Lane Poole to survey the existing timber resources in Papua, then an Australian territory, and later in New Guinea. He spent three years surveying the Papuan and New Guinea forests, from the lowlands to the highlands; he surveyed the country, measured trees, and collected specimens. Although he did not find the stands of timber that could be harvested on a large scale, his extensive notes on such forest products as resin, oils and nuts helped identify other possible avenues of commercial development. His third and youngest daughter was born while he was in Papua. After the missionary Christian Keyser, he was one of the first Europeans to climb the Saruwaged Massif.

=== Melbourne, Canberra, and later life in Sydney (1925–1970) ===
In 1925 Lane Poole moved with his family to the Melbourne suburb of South Yarra, where he was appointed Forestry Adviser for the Commonwealth, on the recommendation of Western Australian senator George Pearce. In 1927 he was appointed Commonwealth Inspector-General of Forests and Acting Principal of the Australian Forestry School, which he had established and strongly campaigned for. The Lane Pooles moved to Canberra in late 1927 and by early 1928 they were living in Yarralumla in Westridge House, the forestry school principal's official residence, which had been designed for them by Harold Desbrowe-Annear with Ruth's input regarding the interiors. The Australian Forestry School, which was later amalgamated into the Australian National University, trained many of Australia's professional foresters. He retired from the Australian Forestry School in 1944 and from the Commonwealth government in 1945, after which he moved to the Sydney suburb of Manly and carried out consulting work. He died on 22 November 1970, aged 85, in Sydney; his body was cremated.

== Legacy ==
The author Mervyn Millet described his friend and mentor as the father of national forestry in Australia, as its first Inspector-General of Forests and in advancing education on management practices.

A large reservation of jarrah forest is named in his honour: the 50,000-hectare (120,000-acre) Lane Poole Reserve is about 100 kilometres (60 mi) from Perth, and contains the old milling town of Nanga Brook.

The species Eucalyptus lane-poolei and Cycas lane-poolei were named in his honour.

== See also ==
- Bendora Arboretum, established by Poole
