= Sophia Lane Poole =

English orientalist

Sophia Lane Poole (1804–1891) was an English orientalist.

She was the estranged wife of Edward Poole and sister of the famous orientalist Edward William Lane, who suggested that she and her sons join him in Egypt so that she could report on the female side of Egypt's gender-segregated society. The result was her book of letters The Englishwoman in Egypt: Letters from Cairo (subtitled written during a residence there in 1842). She wrote that

The opportunities I might enjoy of obtaining an insight into the mode of life of the higher classes of the ladies in this country, and of seeing many things highly interesting in themselves, and rendered more so by their being accessible only to a lady, suggested to him the idea that I might both gratify my own curiosity and collect much information of a novel and interesting nature, which he proposed I should embody in a series of familiar letters to a friend.

Like her brother, Poole adopted local customs and dress in order to gain acceptance in Egyptian social circles. An Egyptian acquaintance of Edward Lane wrote that his household consisted of his mother and sister, "[both of whom] always wore the Egyptian dress, and never left the house except heavily swathed and veiled. The Sheykh al-Dessouki, who frequented Lane’s house regularly, never saw their faces." However, Poole herself hated veiling, and writes that she veiled only in order to gain access to harems, bathhouses, and other "women-only" areas.

She died on 6 May 1891 at the home of her eldest son, Reginald Stuart Poole (1822–1895), at the British Museum, and was buried at West Norwood Cemetery. Another son, Edward Stanley Poole (1830–1867), became an Arabic scholar and editor of the Encyclopædia Britannica. After his death she and her brother Edward Lane raised his three orphaned children, a daughter and two sons, Stanley Lane-Poole (also an orientalist and archaeologist) and Reginald Lane Poole (a historian and archivist).

Sophias' brother was Richard James Lane, a distinguished engraver and lithographer. Her other brother, Edward William Lane was an orientalist like her and so was her eldest son Reginald Stuart Poole.
