= Reginald Ward Poole =

Sir Reginald Ward Edward Lane Poole, KCVO (23 November 1864 – 11 August 1941) was a prominent British solicitor who became President of the Law Society and, according to The Times, "to the public at large perhaps the best known solicitor of his day".

== Biography ==
Poole was born in Paddington, London, the son of Professor Reginald Stuart Poole of London and Eliza Christina Forlonge of Tasmania. He was educated at Bedford School and at the University of London. He was articled to Sir George Lewis, 1st Baronet in 1887, admitted as a solicitor in 1891, and became a partner of Lewis and Lewis, one of the best known legal firms in the country, in 1894, becoming sole partner of the firm in 1927. He was a member of the Council of the Law Society, between 1919 and 1940, President of the Law Society, between 1933 and 1934, Chairman of the Discipline Committee of the Law Society, a Member of the Royal Commission on Police Powers and Procedure, in 1929, and a Member of the Committee appointed by the Lord Chancellor to consider the Law of Defamation, in 1939.

Poole was made a Knight Bachelor in the 1928 Birthday Honours, gazetted on 1 June 1928, and a Knight Commander of the Royal Victorian Order in 1934. He died in London on 11 August 1941, aged 76.
