= Reginald Lane Poole =

British historian (1857–1939)

Reginald Lane Poole or Lane-Poole, FBA (1857–1939), was a British historian. He was Keeper of the Archives and a lecturer in diplomatics at the University of Oxford, where he gave the Ford Lectures in 1912 on the subject of "The Exchequer in the Twelfth Century".

In 1912, Reginald Lane Poole rediscovered the identity of Henry Symeonis, a 13th-century figure whom Oxford students had had to swear not to forgive for centuries after forgetting who he was.

== Life ==
The second of three children (two sons and a daughter) of Edward Stanley Poole (1830–1867) and his wife, Roberta Elizabeth Louisa (1828–1866), daughter of Charles Reddelien, a naturalized German, the "Lane" in his surname comes from his paternal grandmother Sophia Lane Poole, author of An Englishwoman in Egypt (1844). Both his mother and father died during his childhood, so Poole and his siblings were raised by their grandmother Sophia Lane Poole and their great-uncle Edward William Lane. With his wife Rachael, an art historian, he was the father of Austin Lane Poole (1889–1963), also a historian and Ford's Lecturer; the brother of the orientalist Stanley Lane-Poole; and the nephew of Reginald Stuart Poole.

== Works ==
Among other works, he edited a Political History of England (twelve volumes, 1905–10) with William Hunt.

His works include:

- History of the Huguenots of the Dispersion (1880)
- Sebastian Bach (1882)
- Illustrations of the History of Medieval Thought (1884)
- Wycliffe and Movements for Reform (1889)
- Historical Atlas of Modern Europe (1897–1902)
- The Exchequer in the Twelfth Century, Oxford: Clarendon Press, 1912.
- Lectures on the History of the Papal Chancery (1915)
- Medieval Reckonings of Time (1918)
- Illustrations of the History of Medieval Thought and Learning (2nd ed.), London: Richard Clay & Sons, 1920.
- Studies in Chronology and History (1934)
