= S. H. Leeder =

British author (1865–1930)

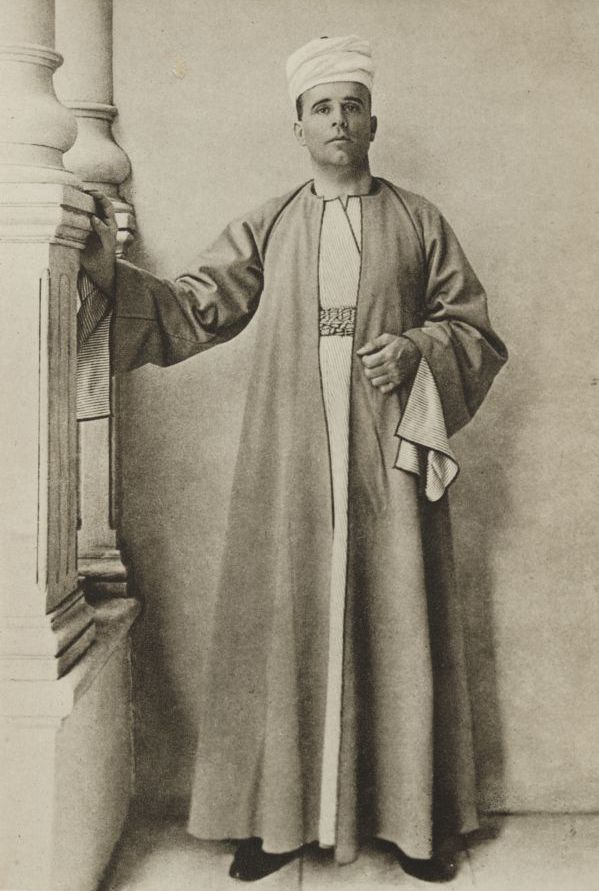
S.H. Leeder in 1918.

Simon Henry Leeder (1865 – 14 May 1930) was a British author. He is best known for work, Modern Sons of the Pharaohs, discussing the Muslim-Christian relations in Egypt.

== Biography ==
Leeder was born in Deptford, London, in 1865, to Simon and Elizabeth Leeder.

== Modern Sons of the Pharaohs ==
Modern Sons of the Pharaohs is a study of Egypt's Coptic Christians, their religious rites and their relationship with Muslims. The author analyses Muslim-Christian relations in Egypt prior to the 1919 Revolution for independence from the British and believes the British occupation has ruined the relationship between Muslims and Copts in Egypt. The book was written after the author lived in Egypt and visited several Coptic families in the Delta and Upper Egypt. The work was published in English in 1918, translated into Arabic by Ahmad Mahmūd and published in 2008 by Dar al-Shuruq in Egypt.

== Other works ==
- The Desert Gateway, Biskra and Thereabouts (1910)
- Veiled Mysteries of Egypt and the Religion of Islam (1912)
