= Namadgi National Park =

National park in Australian Capital Territory

- IUCN category II (national park)
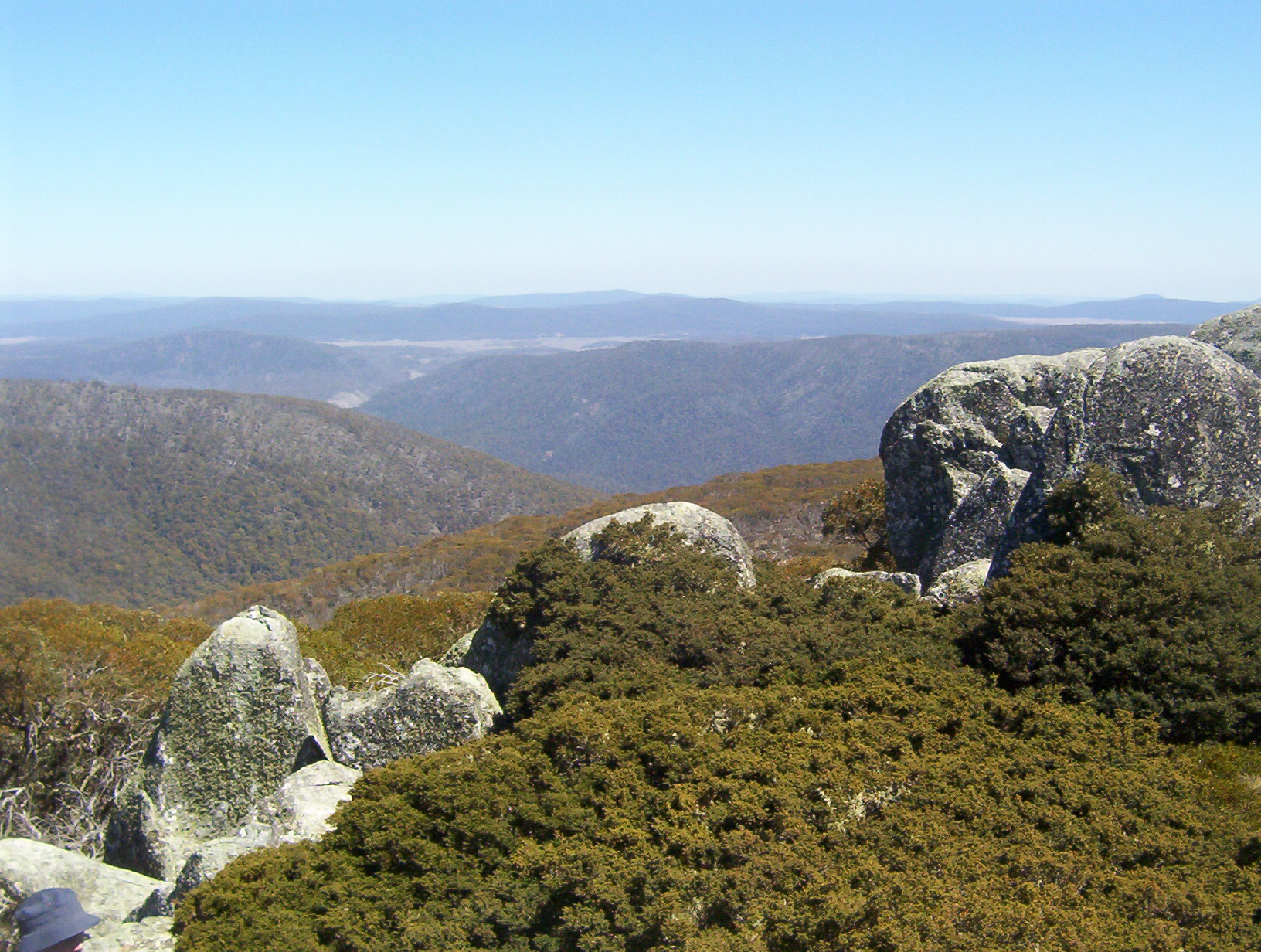
- View from the top of Mount Gingera

- Location within Australian Capital Territory
- Interactive map of Namadgi National Park
- Location: Australian Capital Territory
- Nearest city: Canberra
- Coordinates: 35°31′37″S 148°56′46″E
- Area: 1,060.95 km^{2} (409.64 sq mi)
- Established: 1984
- Governing body: ACT Parks and Conservation Service
- Website: Official website

Namadgi National Park is a protected area in the southwest of the Australian Capital Territory (ACT), bordering Kosciuszko National Park in New South Wales. It lies approximately 40 kilometres (25 mi) southwest of Canberra, and occupies approximately 46 percent of the ACT's land area.

Created in 1984, the park is on the Australian National Heritage List. It suffered badly in the 2019–20 Australian bushfire season, with around 80% of its vegetation burnt.

== History ==
=== Aboriginal history and custodianship ===
Namadgi is a local Aboriginal name for the mountains situated to the south-west of Canberra. Aboriginal presence in the area has been dated to at least 21,000 years. With radiocarbon dates of cultural deposits dating back to 9000–6000 years. There are numerous Aboriginal sites in the national park including rock paintings at Yankee Hat, dating from at least 800 years ago.

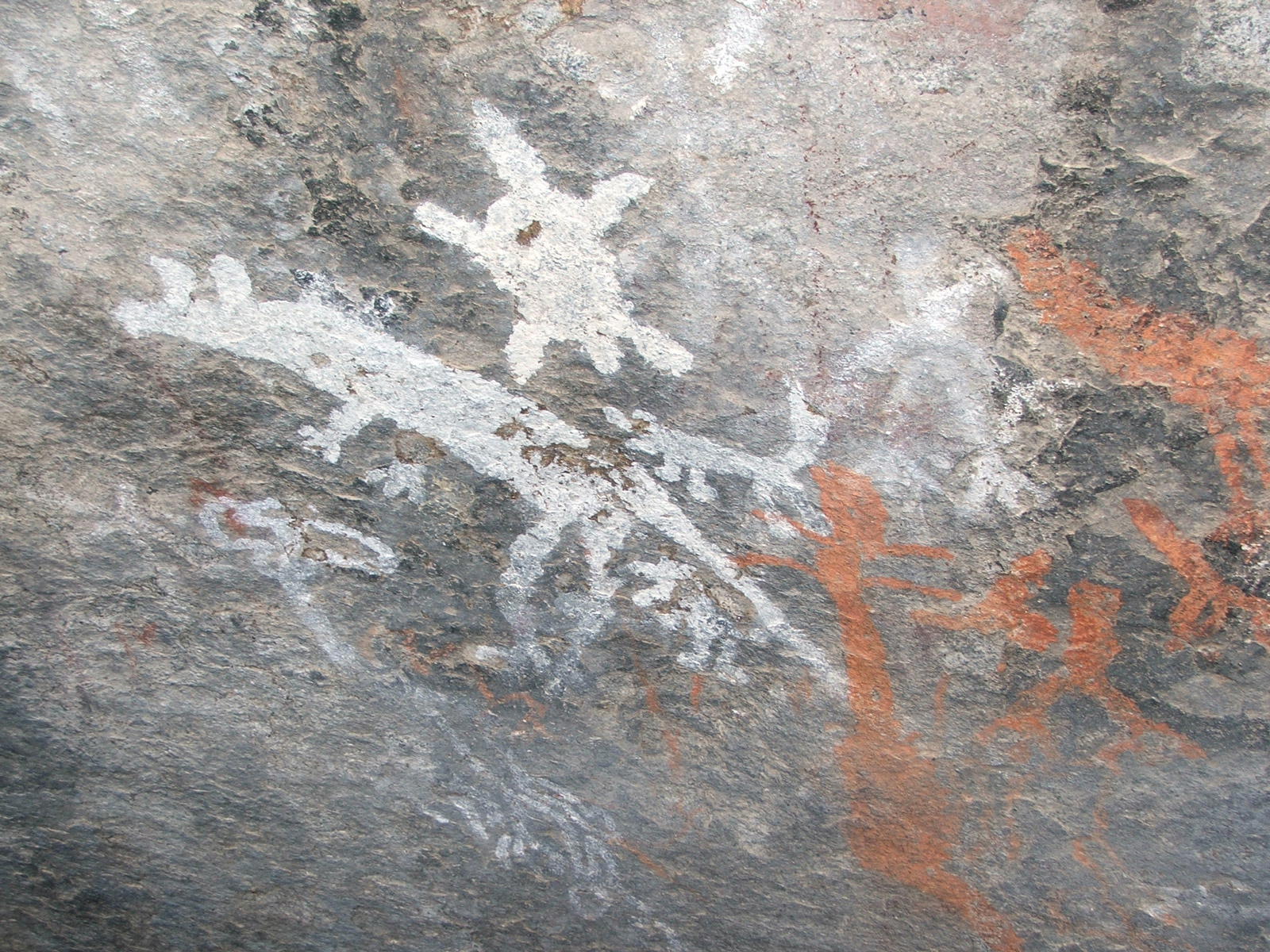
Yankee Hat Aboriginal rock painting featuring a kangaroo, dingos, emus, humans and an echidna or turtle

The area is one of cultural significance to the Aboriginal Australian peoples of the Australian Alps region, who inhabited the ACT region before European settlers arrived, and the national park's management plan is exercised with their consultation. In April 2001, representatives of the Ngambri communities entered into an agreement with the ACT government that recognised their traditional association with the national park lands and their role and duty to their ancestors and descendants as custodians of the area, and established a system of cooperative management. However, as of 2023, the Ngunnawal people are recognised as the traditional owners of the land.

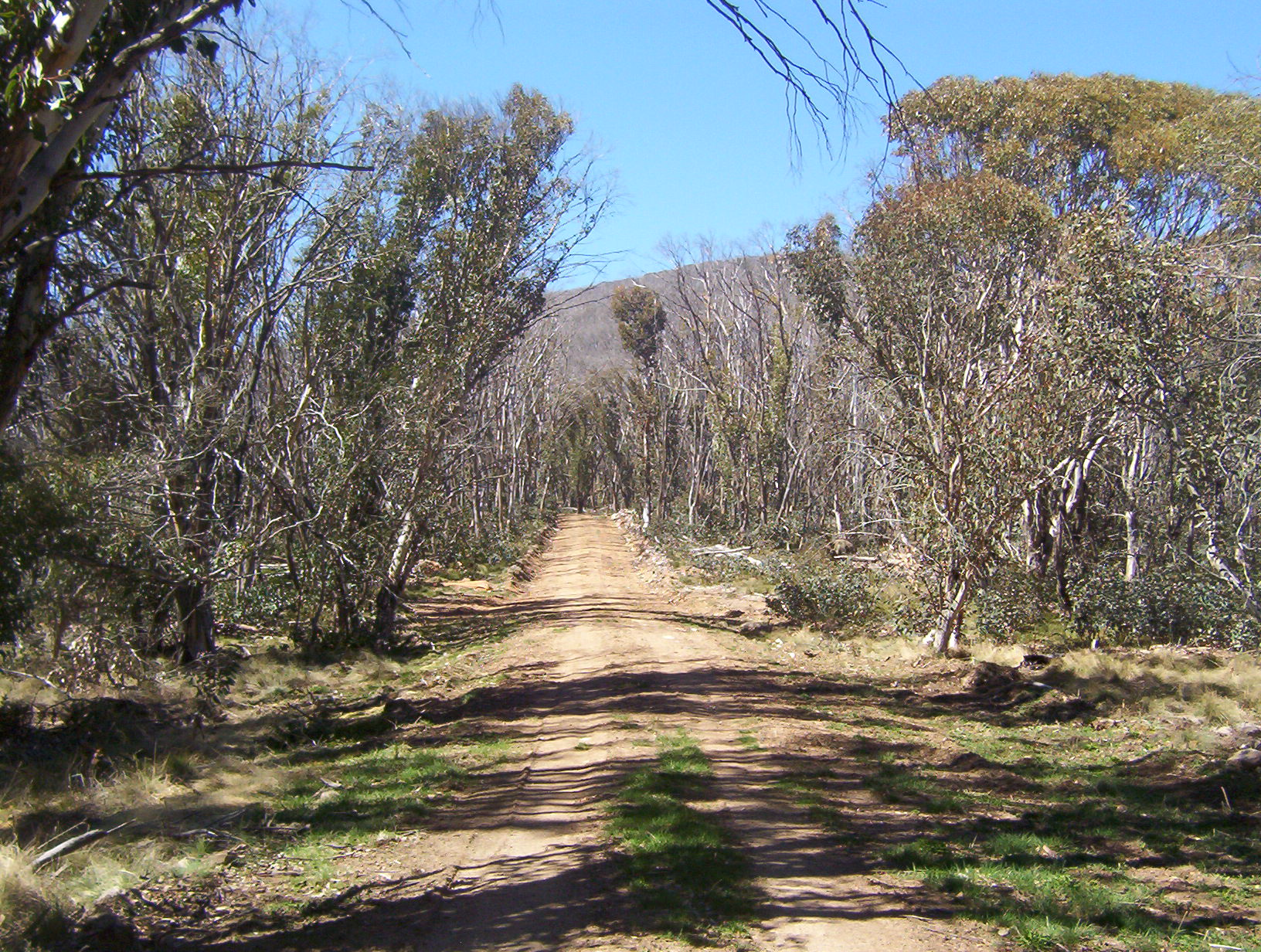
Namadgi National Park walking trail

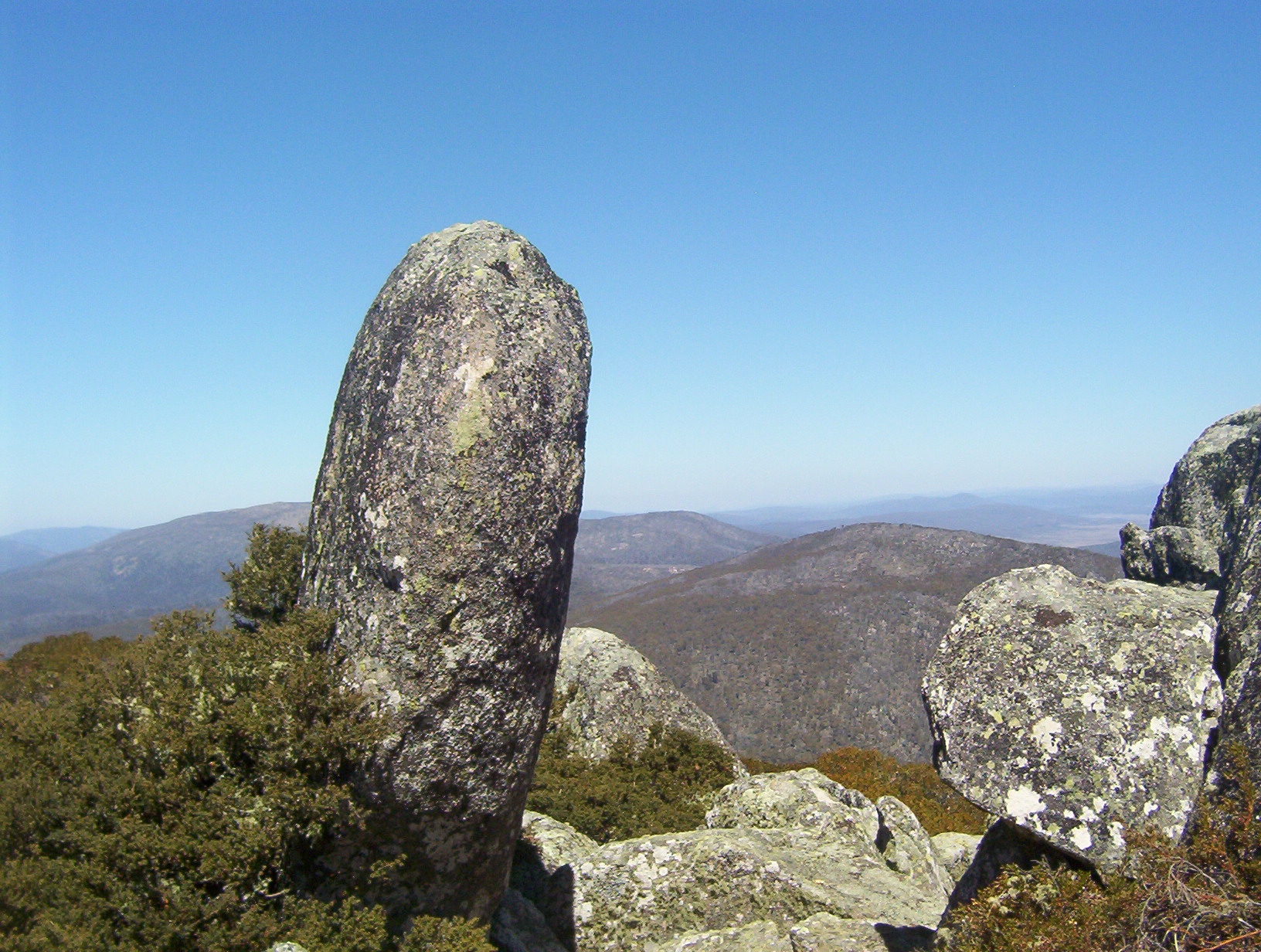
View from the top of the Mount Ginini

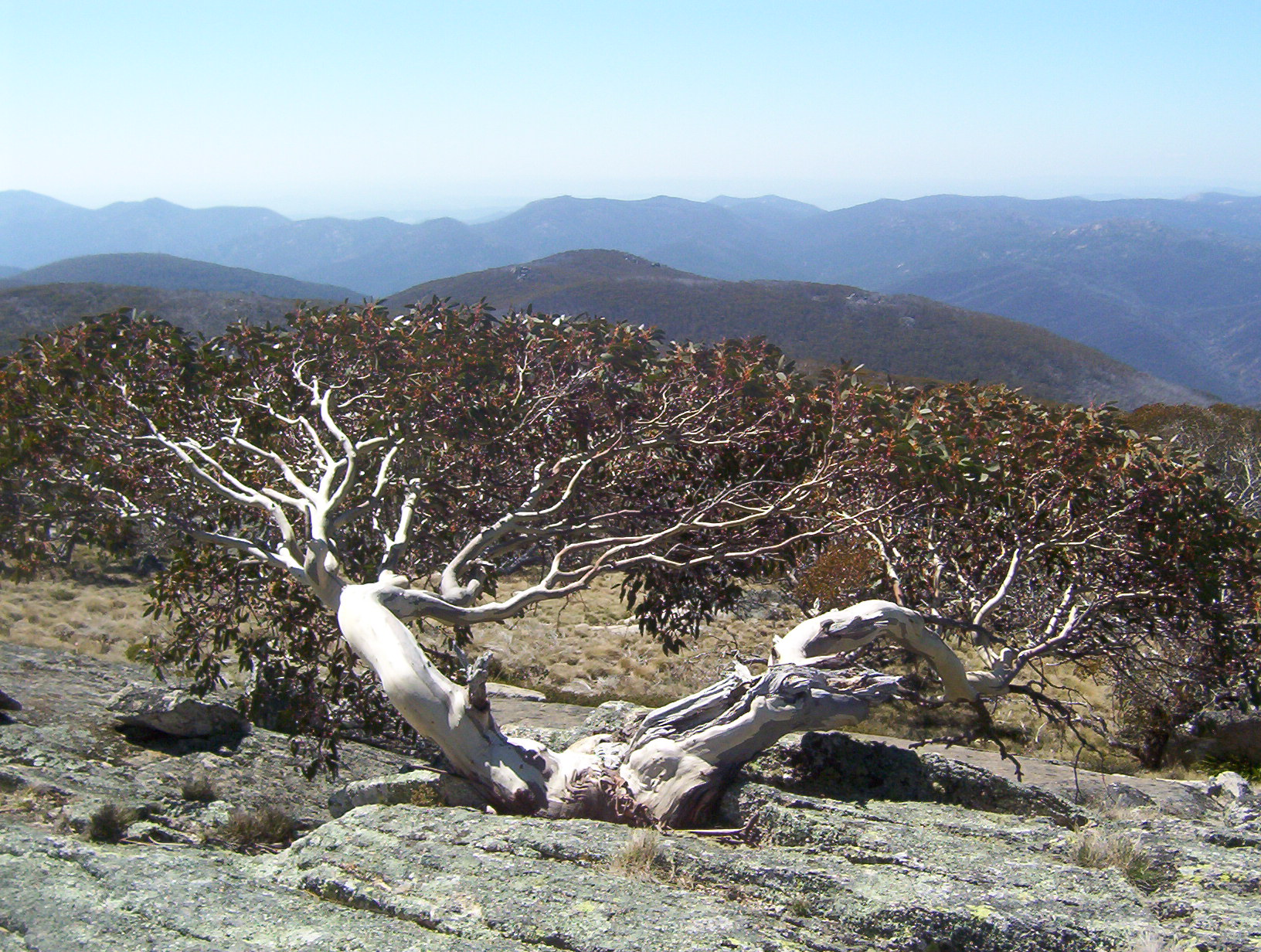
Eucalyptus pauciflora subsp. niphophila

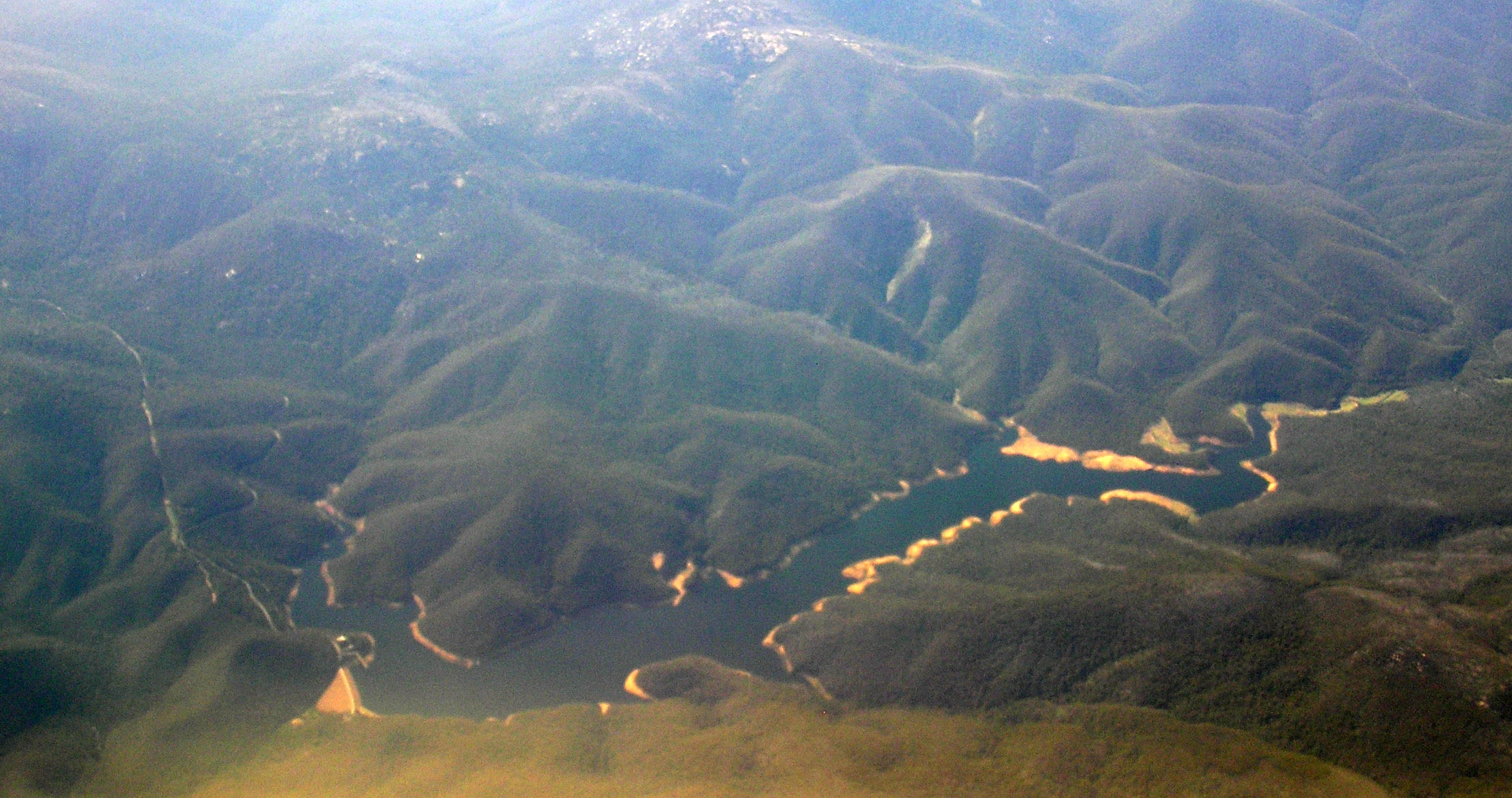
Aerial view of Corin Dam

=== After European settlement ===
The area has a European history dating back to the 1830s, when settlers moved into the area and cleared the valleys for farming. The mountains and ridges remain forested.

Namadgi National Park was created in 1984.

=== 2020 bushfire ===
In January 2020, the Orroral Valley bushfire during the Black Summer season burnt about 80% of the national park (82,700 hectares (204,000 acres)). An army MRH-90 Taipan helicopter, as part of Operation Bushfire Assist conducting reconnaissance for landing sites for remote area fire-fighting teams, attempted to land for a break when their landing light ignited the fire in dry grass.

== Description ==
Namadgi National Park lies approximately 40 kilometres (25 mi) southwest of Canberra, and makes up approximately 46 percent of the ACT's land area. The Visitor Centre is located 2 km (1.2 mi) south of Tharwa on the Boboyan-Naas Road.

The water catchment area of the park supplies approximately 85% of water for the nation's capital city, Canberra.

The national park is classified as an IUCN Category II protected area.

=== Flora and fauna ===
The national park protects part of the northern end of the Australian Alps. Its habitat ranges from grassy plains over snow gum forests to alpine meadows and wetlands.

The fauna is also varied: eastern grey kangaroos, wallabies, wombats, magpies, rosellas and ravens are commonly seen. The park includes fens with sedges, and sphagnum moss bogs that provide habitat for the northern corroboree frog (Pseudophryne pengilleyi), an endangered species.

A single specimen of a new species of spider wasp in the Epipompilus genus was found in the park in 2018 and identified in 2020. The species has been named Epipompilus namadji. As of 2021 efforts are ongoing by teams from the Australian National Insect Collection at the CSIRO to find more of the wasps, as the bushfire has destroyed 80% of the park since the sighting.

== Australian National Heritage List ==
On 7 November 2008, the national park was one of eleven protected areas added to the Australian National Heritage List under the title of the Australian Alps National Parks and Reserves.

== Climate ==
In this sub-alpine region, the weather ranges from cold winter nights to warm summer days, and it can change very quickly. Snow normally falls on the Bimberi and Brindabella Ranges during winter, and is not uncommon throughout most of the park. The highest mountain is Bimberi Peak at 1,911 metres (6,270 ft), the highest peak in the Australian Capital Territory.

== Winter sports ==
The Namadgi National Park Draft Management Plan (September 2005) downplayed the future development of skiing as a sport in the Park, noting that no facilities existed for alpine or downhill skiing within Namadgi, despite a history of downhill skiing associated with the Canberra Alpine Ski Club and the Mt Franklin Chalet (destroyed in the 2003 bushfires). The report predicted that it would be "unlikely that Namadgi will be suitable for this activity in the future as climate change is causing conditions to become less favourable". However, since the report was written, limited downhill ski facilities have returned at nearby Corin Forest, and cross country skiing takes place within the Park at various locations when conditions allow.

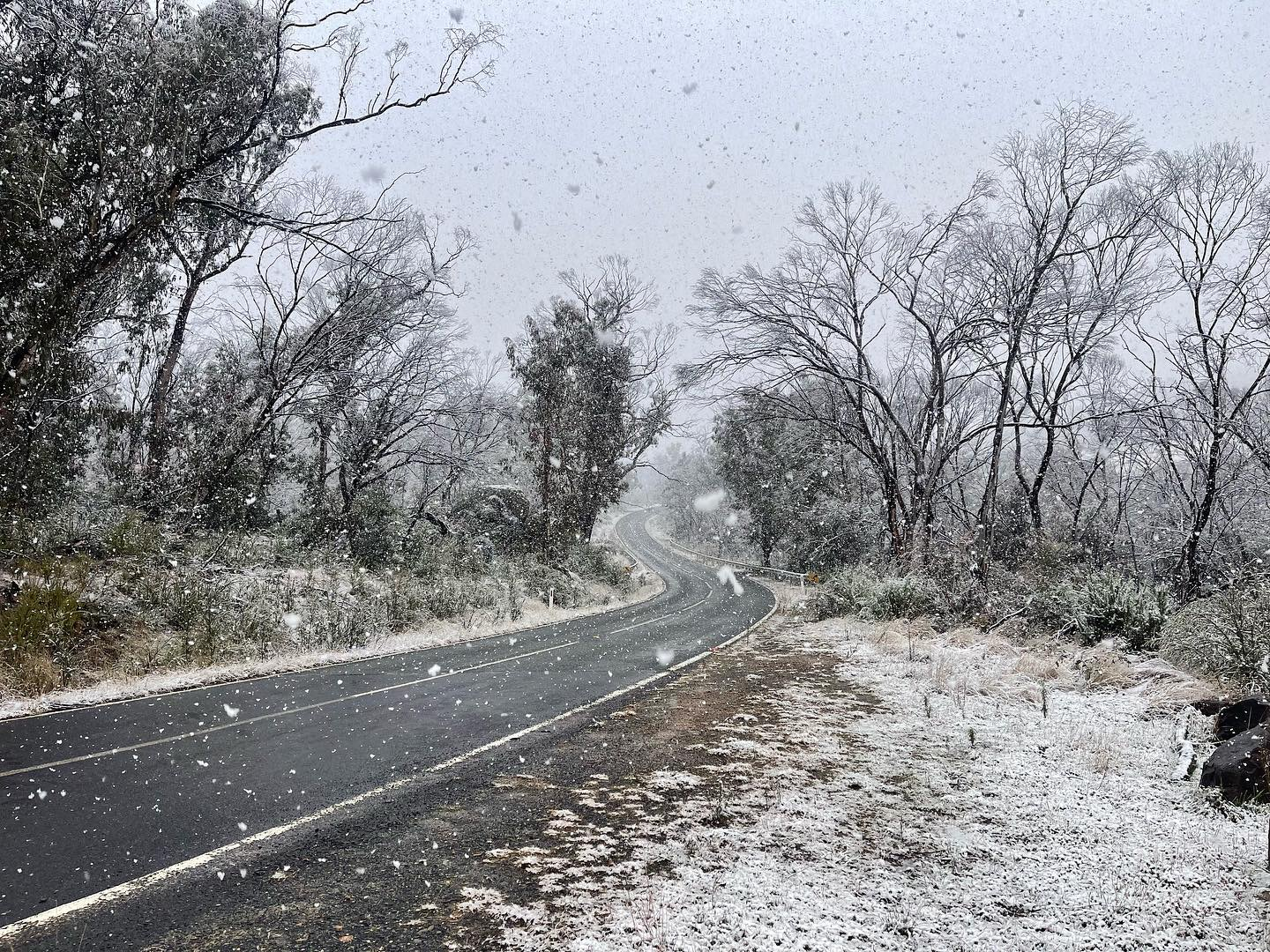
Boboyan Road during autumn snowfall

Mt Franklin

In the 1930s, with construction of the new capital city of Canberra under way, Canberrans explored the possibilities for developing skiing and snow sports in the Brindabellas. On 30 June 1936, the Canberra Times newspaper reported:

Regularly-conducted Alpine Sports on the mountain range which forms the western boundary between the Federal Capital Territory and New South Wales are to be added to the attractions of Canberra. The Canberra Alpine Club, an enthusiastic body, which has a membership of about 80, has plans in hand which, its members consider, will in the future make Canberra's ranges rival Mount Kosciuszko in popularity.

The Mount Franklin chalet was constructed at Mount Franklin in 1938 to service the Canberra Alpine Club. Ski runs were cleared and ski tows were improvised. The club also cleared runs elsewhere, completing a new ski run and jump on nearby Mount Ginini in 1951 - then judged to be the superior slope. Built on leased land, the Mount Franklin Chalet reverted to the Government when Namadgi National Park was created in 1984 and later operated as a museum before being destroyed in the 2003 bushfires. A new shelter designed and built by University of Adelaide students opened in 2008. Today, cross-country skiing is possible in the area when conditions allow.

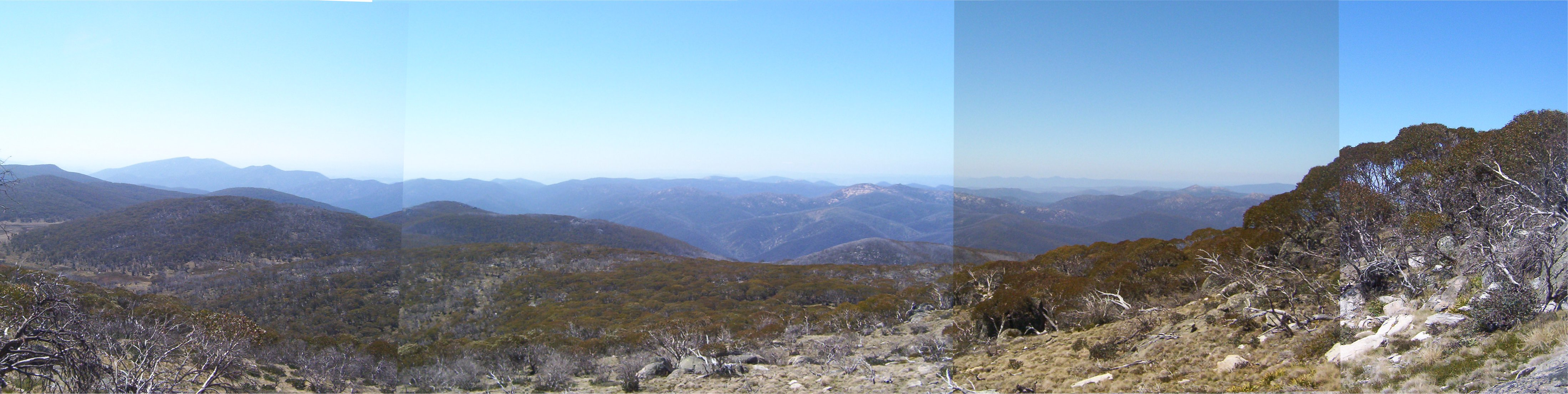
Panoramic view from the top of Mount Ginini, Namadgi National Park

== See also ==
- Bendora Arboretum, located within the park
- Booroomba Rocks
- Ginini Flats Wetlands Ramsar Site
- List of national parks of Australia
- Protected areas of the Australian Capital Territory
