= Stanley Lane-Poole =

British orientalist and archaeologist (1854–1931)

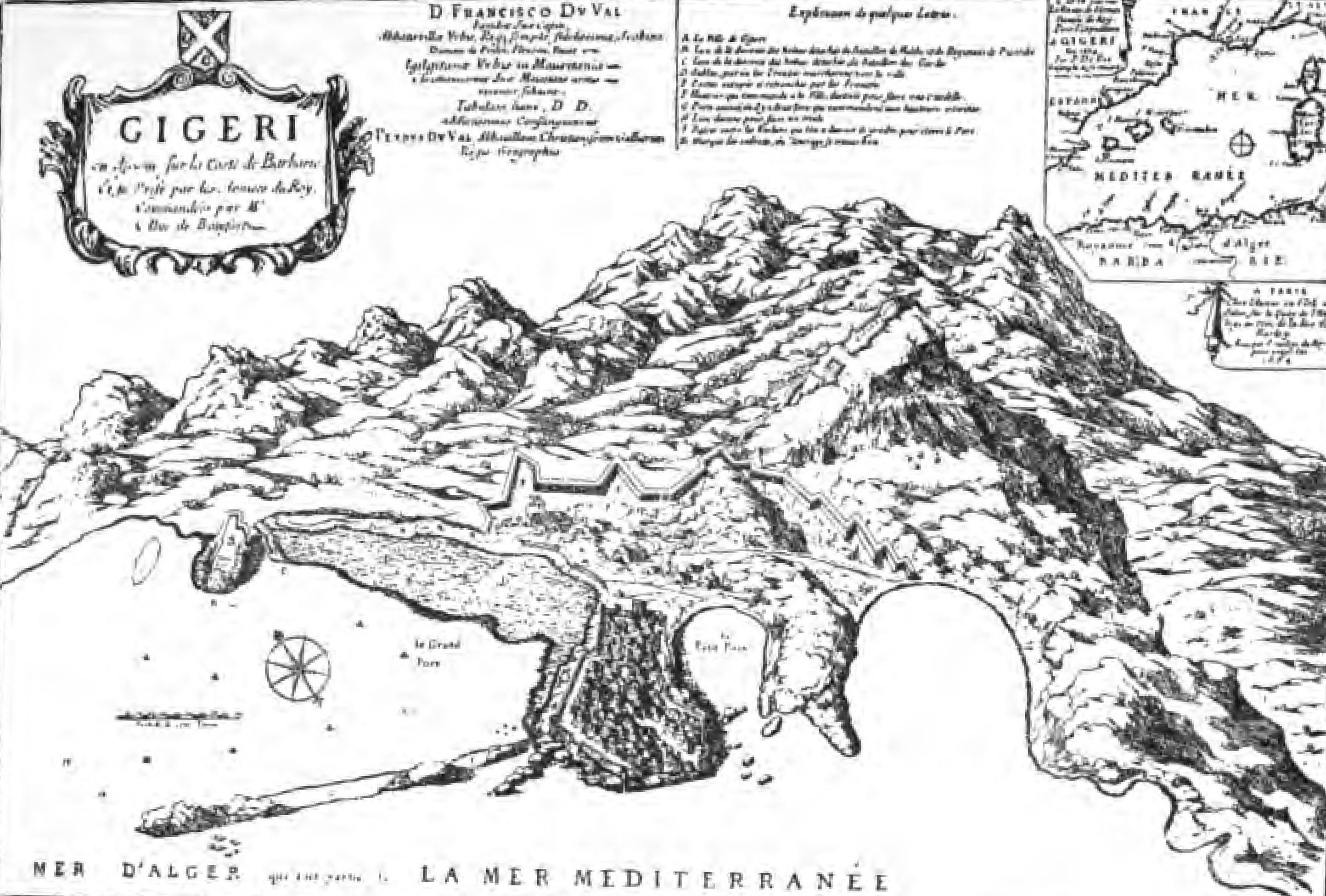
Jijel in 1664 by Stanley Lane-Poole

Stanley Edward Lane-Poole (18 December 1854 – 29 December 1931) was a British orientalist and archaeologist.

== Biography ==
Lane Poole was Born in London, England, the eldest of three children (two sons and a daughter) of Edward Stanley Poole (1830–1867) and his wife, Roberta Elizabeth Louisa (1828–1866), daughter of Charles Reddelien, a naturalized German. His paternal grandmother Sophia Lane Poole, uncle Reginald Stuart Poole and great-uncle Edward William Lane were famous for their work in orientalism and archaeology. His other great-uncle was Richard James Lane, a distinguished Victorian lithographer and engraver. His brother Reginald Lane Poole was an archivist and historian. Both his mother and father died during his childhood, so Poole and his siblings were raised by their grandmother Sophia Lane Poole and their great-uncle Edward William Lane. From 1874 to 1892 he worked in the British Museum, and after that in Egypt researching on Egyptian archaeology. From 1897 to 1904 he had a chair as Professor of Arabic studies at Trinity College Dublin.

He was married to Charlotte Bell Wilson from 1879 until her death in 1905. The couple had three sons and a daughter; his eldest son predeceased him while of his other two sons, Richard was a Royal Navy officer and Charles was a forester who did much work in Australia.

== Bibliography ==
=== Books ===
- Completed the First Book of the Arabic-English Lexicon, left unfinished by his uncle, E. W. Lane.
- Coins of the Urtuki Turkumans, International Numismata Orientalia, part 2 1875
- The Life of Edward William Lane (1877)
- The People of Turkey (editor) (1878)
- Lane's Selection From the Kuran (1879)
- Egypt (1881)
- Le Korân, sa poésie et ses lois (1882)
- Studies in a Mosque (Cairo, February 1883)
- Picturesque Palestine, Sinai and Egypt, D. Appleton: New York (1883)
- Social Life in Egypt: A Description of the Country & Its People (1884)
- The Life of the late General F.R. Chesney (editor) (1885)
- Lane-Poole, Stanley (1886). The art of the Saracens in Egypt (1886). Chapman and Hall (London).
- The Story of the Moors in Spain (1886)
- Turkey (1888)
- Lane-Poole, Stanley (1890). The Barbary Corsairs (1890). T. Fisher Unwin (London).
- Sir Richard Church (1890)
- The Speeches and Table-Talk of the Prophet Mohammad (1893)
- The Mohammedan Dynasties: Chronological and Genealogical Tables with Historical Introductions (1894)
- Lane-Poole, Stanley (1898). Saladin and the Fall of the Kingdom of Jerusalem. New York, London: G.P. Putnam's Sons.
- Babar, Rulers of India series (1899)
- Lane-Poole, Stanley (1901). History of Egypt in the Middle Ages. New York, Scribner's.
- Medieval India under Mohammedan Rule, AD 712-1764 (1903)
- Saladin and the Fall of the Kingdom of Jerusalem (1903)
- The Story of Cairo (1906)
- Lane-Poole, Stanley (1907). History of India: From Mohammedan Conquest to the Reign of Akbar the Great (Vol. 3). London, Grolier society.
- Life of Sir Harry Parkes with F.V. Dickins (1894)
- "The Caliphate". The Quarterly Review. 224: 162–177. July 1915.

=== Articles ===
- Approximately 72 entries (up to 1901) in Dictionary of National Biography
- "Burton, Sir Richard Francis" . Encyclopædia Britannica. Vol. 04 (11th ed.). 1911. pp. 864–865.
- Introduction to 1913 edition of Richard Francis Burton (1856), Personal Narrative of a Pilgrimage to Al Madinah and Meccah, 3 volumes.

== Edited ==
- Edward William Lane (1885). Stanley Lane-Poole (ed.). An Arabic-English lexicon: derived from the best and the most copious eastern sources. Williams and Norgate. p. 3064.
- Edward William Lane (1863). Stanley Lane-Poole (ed.). An Arabic-English lexicon: derived from the best and the most copious eastern sources. Vol. 1, Part 1 of An Arabic-English Lexicon. Williams and Norgate. p. 3064.
- Edward William Lane, Stanley Lane-Poole (1865). An Arabic-English lexicon: derived from the best and the most copious eastern sources ... Williams and Norgate.
- Edward William Lane, Stanley Lane-Poole (1863). An Arabic-English lexicon: derived from the best and the most copious eastern sources ... Vol. 1 of An Arabic-English Lexicon: Derived from the Best and the Most Copious Eastern Sources. Williams and Norgate.
- Edward William Lane (1893). Stanley Lane-Poole (ed.). An Arabic-English lexicon: derived from the best and the most copious eastern sources. Vol. 1, Part 8 of An Arabic-English Lexicon. Williams and Norgate. p. 3064.
- Edward William Lane (1877). Stanley Lane-Poole (ed.). An Arabic-English lexicon: derived from the best and the most copious eastern sources. Vol. 1, Part 6 of An Arabic-English Lexicon. Williams and Norgate. p. 3064.
- Edward William Lane (1865). Stanley Lane-Poole (ed.). Arabic-English lexicon, Volume 1, Part 2 (reprint ed.). Islamic Book Centre. p. 3064.
- Edward William Lane (1872). Stanley Lane-Poole (ed.). Arabic-English lexicon, Volume 1, Part 4 (reprint ed.). Islamic Book Centre. p. 3064.
