= Reginald Stuart Poole =

English archaeologist, numismatist and orientalist (1832–1895)

Reginald Stuart Poole (27 January 1832 – 8 February 1895), known as Stuart Poole, was an English archaeologist, numismatist and Orientalist. Poole was from a famous Orientalist family; his mother Sophia Lane Poole, his uncle Edward William Lane and his nephew Stanley Lane-Poole were all famous for their work in this field. His other uncle was Richard James Lane, a distinguished Victorian lithographer and engraver.

== Life ==
Born in London, Poole was the son of the Rev. Edward Poole, a well-known bibliophile. His parents became estranged during his early childhood, and his mother, Sophia Lane Poole, took her sons to Egypt to live with her brother, the Orientalist Edward William Lane. During their seven-year residence in Cairo from 1842 to 1849, Lane Poole wrote The Englishwoman in Egypt, while her son was imbibing an early taste for Egyptian antiquities.

In 1852 he became an assistant in the British Museum and was assigned to the Department of Coins and Medals, of which in 1870 he became keeper. In that capacity he worked as a writer, teacher, and administrator. He was largely responsible for founding the Egypt Exploration Fund in 1882 and for starting the Society of English Medallists in 1884. He was Yates Professor of Archaeology at University College, London from 1889, and also a lecturer at the Royal Academy. In 1883 he received an honorary degree from Cambridge University. He received the Medal of the Royal Numismatic Society in 1892.

On 6 August 1861, he had married Eliza Christina Forlonge, daughter of William Forlonge, with whom he had four children, including Sir Reginald Ward Poole.

Poole retired in 1893 and died in 1895.

== Works ==
Some of Poole's best work was done in his articles for the 9th edition of the Encyclopædia Britannica, on Egypt, Hieroglyphics and Numismatics; he also wrote for Smith's Dictionary of the Bible and published volumes dealing with his special subjects.

Poole was one of the strong defenders in England of the work of Champollion when he was criticized harshly by Sir George Lewis even as late as 1862. In reply to Lewis critique, Poole defended Champollion's method describing it as "the method of interpreting Hieroglyphics originated by Dr. Young and developed by Champollion".

== Selected publications ==
[NC = Numismatic Chronicle]

- 1860 Cairo, Sinai, Jerusalem, and The Pyramids of Egypt: A Series of Sixty Photographic Viewsby Francis Frith, Sophie Lane Poole and Reginald Stuart Poole.
- 1860 The Genesis of the Earth and of Man: a critical examination of passages in the Hebrew and Greek Scriptures, chiefly with a view to the solution of the question, Whether the varieties of the Human Species be of more than one origin
- 1861 On a coin of Mallus in Cilicia [read 26 Jan 1859], NC, New Series, vol. 1 (1861), part 2, pp. 87–90, text fig.
- 1861 On a copper coin of the class struck after the death of Alexander the Great, by his generals, before they assumed regal titles [read 25 April 1861], NC, New Series, vol. 1 (1861), part 3, pp.; 137–0139, text fig.
- 1861 On two Cretan coins in the British Museum [read 22 March 1860], NC, New Series, vol. 1 (1861), part 3, pp. 168–74, pl.
- 1861 On a coin from the Cyrenaica, presented to the British Museum by the late F.H. Crowe, Esq., H.M. Consul at Cairo [read 24 Oct 1861], NC, New Series, vol. 1 (1861), part 4, pp. 201–3, text fig.
- 1862 On a new coin of ancient Italy [read 20 Nov 1862], NC, New Series, vol. 2 (1862), part 8, pp. 300–1, text fig.
- 1863 The late Colonel Leake's Collection of Greek Coins [offered to Cambridge University for £5000], NC, New Series, Vol. 3 (1863), part 12, pp. 266–67. [accepted, see 1864, 75]
- 1864 The coins of the Ptolemies (to be continued), NC, New Series, vol. 4 (1864), part 13, pp. 7–16, pl., 2 tables [see 159, 231 below; 1865, 126, 321; 1866, 1; 1867, 161]
- 1864 Coins of the Ptolemies, continued, NC, New Series, vol. 4 (1864), part 15, pp. 159–73, 2 pl.
- 1864 Coins of the Ptolemies, continued, NC, New Series, vol. 4 91864), part 16, pp. 231–35, 2 pl.
- 1864 On Greek coins as illustrating Greek art [delivered 27 May 1864], p. 236-47, pl.
- 1865 Coins of the Ptolemies, continued, NC, New Series, vol. 5 (1865), part 18, pp. 126–60, pl, 2 charts.
- 1865 Coins of the Ptolemies, continued, NC, New Series, vol. 5 (1865), part 20, pp. 321–36, 2 pl, 2 charts.
- 1866 Coins of the Ptolemies, continued, NC, New Series, vol. 6 (1866), part 21, pp. 1–20, 3 text figs.
- 1867 Coins of the Ptolemies, concluded, NC, New Series, vol. 7 (1867), part 27, pp. 161–202.
- 1875–1890 Catalogue of Oriental coins in the British Museum, by Stanley Lane-Poole and Reginald Stuart Poole.
- 1878 A descriptive catalogue of Swiss coins in the South Kensington Museum, by Reginald Stuart Poole, Chauncy Hare Townshend, and Victoria and Albert Museum.
- 1885 Coins and medals : their place in history and art by Reginald Stuart Poole and Stanley Lane-Poole.
- 1892 Catalogue of the coins of Alexandria and the Nomes / by Reginald Stuart Poole (in the series: Catalogue of the Greek coins in the British Museum, ed. by Reginald Stuart Poole).
- 1854/85 On the coinage of the dynasties called the Benee-Tooloon and the Ikhsheedeeyeh, ruling in Egypt, NC 17 (1854–55), pp. 116–26, pl.
- 1876 Catalogue of Greek Coins in the British Museum, ed. by R.S. Poole, with B.V. Head and P. Gardner, London, 1876. (announced in NC, New Series, vol. 16 (1876), part 63, p. 276.
- 1877 Catalogue of Oriental Coins in the British Museum: vol. II, Coins of the Mohammedan Dynasties, Classes III-X, by Stanley Lane Poole, ed. by R.S. Poole, London, 1876 (announced in NC, New Series, vol. 17 (1877), part 65, p. 78.
- 1883 Athenian coin-engravers in Italy (coins of Terina) [read 21 Feb 1884], NC, Third Series, vol. 3 (1883), part 12, pp. 269–77, 2 pl.
- 1889 Catalogue of the Greek coins in the British Museum – Pontus, Paphlagonia, Bithynia and the Kingdom of the Bosporus, by Warwick Wroth, ed. by R.S. Poole, London, 1889 (announced by B.V. Head in NC, Third Series, vol. 38 (1890), pp. 173–74.

== Obituaries ==
- The Times, 9 February 1895; pg. 5; Issue 34496; col F
- The Advertiser (Adelaide, Australia), 11 February 1895, p. 5.
- Australian Town and Country Journal (NSW, Australia), 16 February 1895, p. 12.
- The Mercury (Hobart, Tasmania), 13 February 1895, p. 3.
