= Poole (surname) =

Poole is a surname. Notable people with the surname include:

- Adalbert Poole (1881–1970), Canadian politician
- Andrew Poole (cricketer) (born 1967), English cricketer
- Andy Poole (footballer) (born 1960), English footballer
- Anna Ware Poole (1838-1929), American composer
- Austin Lane Poole (1889–1963), British mediaevalist
- Barney Poole (1923–2005), American football player
- Ben Poole, British blues rock guitarist, singer, and songwriter.
- Bertram William Henry Poole (1880–1957), British-American philatelist
- Brandi Poole, American basketball coach
- Brian Poole (born 1941), British singer and entertainer, lead singer of Brian Poole and the Tremeloes
- Bruce Poole (born 1959), American politician
- Carolynne Poole (born 1980), British singer-songwriter
- Cecil Charles Poole (1885–1970), British politician
- Cecil F. Poole (1914–1997), American lawyer and judge
- Charles Poole (politician) (1874–1941), New Zealand politician
- Charles Lane Poole (1885–1970), Australian forester
- Charlie Poole (1892–1931), American banjo player
- Christopher "Kit" Poole (1875–1965), Irish Citizen Army officer during the 1916 Easter Rising
- Christopher Poole (born c.1988), American founder of web sites 4chan and Canvas
- Cyril Poole (1921–1996), English cricketer and footballer
- Daniel Poole (1882–1959), Australian seaman and soldier
- David Poole (disambiguation), several people
- Dianne Poole (born 1949), Canadian politician
- Dick Poole (disambiguation), several people
- Dougie Poole, American singer-songwriter
- Earl Lincoln Poole (1891–1972), American wildlife artist, sculptor, author and naturalist
- Ed Poole (1874–1919), American baseball player
- Elizabeth Poole (1588–1654), English settler in Plymouth Colony
- Eric Poole (1885–1916), British Army officer of World War I
- Eric Joseph Poole (1907–1969), Canadian politician
- Ernest Poole (1880–1950), American novelist
- Eugene J. Poole (1880–1958), American politician
- Fanny Huntington Runnells Poole (1863–1940), American writer, book reviewer
- Frazer Poole (1915-1999), American librarian and preservationist
- Freddi Poole (born 1946), American singer
- Frederic Slaney Poole (1845–1936), Anglican priest in South Australia
- Gary Poole (born 1967), English footballer
- George Temple-Poole (1856–1934), British architect
- Glenn Poole (born 1981), English footballer
- Harold Poole (1943–2014), American bodybuilder
- Henry Poole (disambiguation), several people
- Hester Martha Poole (1833–1932), American writer, artist, advocate
- Horatio Nelson Poole (1884–1949), American painter and printmaker
- Ike Poole (1915–2002), American basketball player
- James Poole (disambiguation), several people
- Janelle Poole, Australian politician
- Jim Poole (disambiguation), several people
- Joe Poole (1923–1990), English footballer
- John Poole (disambiguation), several people
- Jon Poole (born 1969), English singer and songwriter
- Jonas Poole (c.1566–1612), English explorer, sealer, and whaler
- Jordan Poole (born 1999), American basketball player
- Karen Poole (born 1971), British singer and songwriter, daughter of Brian
- Keith Poole (born 1974), American football player
- Kenny Poole (1947–2006), American jazz guitarist
- Kevin Poole (born 1963), English football player
- Larry Poole, American actor and film producer
- Leonard Poole (died 1965), American basketball player
- Lynn Poole (1910–1969), American science writer and broadcaster
- Malcolm Poole (born 1949), Australian field hockey player
- Marin Poole (born 1984), American beauty queen
- Mark Poole, American illustrator
- Marshall Scott Poole (born 1951), American communication researcher
- Matthew Poole (1624–1679), English theologian
- Max Poole (born 2003), British cyclist
- Minor Butler Poole (1920–1942), United States Navy sailor, Navy Cross recipient
- Nate Poole (born 1977), American football player
- Nick Poole (born 1973), Canadian ice hockey player
- Oliver Poole, 1st Baron Poole (1911–1993), British politician, soldier and businessman
- Olivia Poole (1889–1975), American inventor
- Paul Falconer Poole (1806–1879), British painter
- Phil Poole (born 1959), American Democratic politician
- Phillip Poole (born 1981), British ice dancer
- Ray Poole (1921–2008), American football player
- Reg Poole (born 1944), Australian musician
- Reg Poole (footballer) (1942–2021), Australian footballer
- Regan Poole (born 1998), Welsh football player
- Reginald Lane Poole (1857–1939), British historian
- Reginald Stuart Poole (1832–1895), English orientalist
- Sir Reginald Ward Poole (1864–1941), British solicitor, President of the Law Society
- Robert Poole (disambiguation), multiple people
- Roger Poole (1946–2015), British trade union official
- Rose M. Poole (1880–1963), American businesswoman and politician
- Russell Poole (1956–2015), American policeman from Los Angeles
- Sandra Le Poole (born 1959), Dutch field hockey player
- Shelly Poole (born 1972), English songwriter and singer, daughter of Brian
- Sophia Lane Poole (1804–1891), English orientalist
- Stafford Poole (1930–2020), American historian
- Stanley Lane-Poole (1854–1931), British orientalist, archaeologist and writer
- Steven Poole (born 1972), British writer and journalist
- Suzelle Poole (born 1940), British ballet dancer and poet
- Teresa Poole (born 1964), Australian Paralympic cyclist
- Terry Poole (disambiguation)
- Theodore L. Poole (1840–1900), American politician from New York
- Thomas Poole (disambiguation), several people
- Trevor Poole (born 1964), Australian footballer
- Tyrone Poole (born 1972), American football player
- Vicki Poole, New Zealand diplomat
- Wakefield Poole (1936–2021), American dancer, choreographer, and director
- Will Poole (born 1981), American football player
- William Poole (disambiguation), several people
- William Frederick Poole (1821–1894), American bibliographer and librarian

== Fictional characters ==
- Danielle Poole, a character portrayed by Krys Marshall in the television series For All Mankind
- Eric Poole, a character and primary antagonist in the Robert Cormier novel Tenderness
- Frank Poole, a character in Arthur C. Clarke's Space Odyssey science fiction series
- Grace Poole, a character in Charlotte Brontë's 1847 novel Jane Eyre
- Grace Poole, a character portrayed by Grace Zabriskie in the 1990 film Child's Play 2
- Gwen Poole, a character transported to the Marvel Universe in 2016 as a superhero and supervillain
- Gwendolyn Poole, a character in Sarah Andersen's 2017 re-illustration of the Andy Weir webcomic series Cheshire Crossing
- Jeffrey Poole, a Marvel Universe land-shark and the pet/adoptive son of Gwen Poole and Kate Bishop
- Jeyne Poole, a character in George R. R. Martin's A Song of Ice and Fire fantasy series
- Martha Poole, a character in the Marvel series The Unbelievable GwenPool and the mother of Gwen and Teddy Poole
- Mr. Poole, a character in Robert Louis Stevenson's 1886 novel Strange Case of Dr Jekyll and Mr Hyde
- Richard Poole, a character portrayed by Ben Miller in the first three series of the television series Death in Paradise
- Riley Poole, a character portrayed by Justin Bartha in the film series National Treasure
- Teddy Poole, a character in the Marvel series The Unbelievable GwenPool and the brother of Gwen Poole
- Ted Poole, a character in the Marvel series The Unbelievable GwenPool and the father of Gwen and Teddy Poole

== See also ==
- Pool (surname)
- Poole (disambiguation)
