= William Poole (disambiguation) =

William Poole (1821–1855), also known as "Bill the Butcher", was an American gang member and leader of the Know Nothing political movement

William Poole may also refer to:

- William Poole (Australian politician) (1828–1902), New South Wales politician
- William Poole (economist) (born 1937), American economist, former president of the Federal Reserve Bank of St. Louis
- William A. Poole (1831–1903), merchant and politician from Prince Edward Island, Canada
- William B. Poole (1833–1904), American sailor and Medal of Honor recipient
- William Frederick Poole (1821–1894), American bibliographer and librarian
- William H. Poole (politician), member of the California legislature
- William H. Poole (writer) (1820–1896), Canadian minister and writer
- William Henry Poole (1876–1921), college football player and minister
- William Henry Evered Poole (1902–1969), South African military commander and diplomat
- William Leslie Poole (1866–1931), English immigrant to Uruguay important to the development of association football in Uruguay
- William Mansfield Poole (1871–1946), educationalist and author
- William T. Poole, 20th-century American research analyst for the US Congress

== See also ==
- Bill Poole, American politician
- Will Poole (born 1981), American footballer
- William Wortham Pool (1842–1922), American bookkeeper
