= Joachim Pease =

American Civil War Medal of Honor recipient

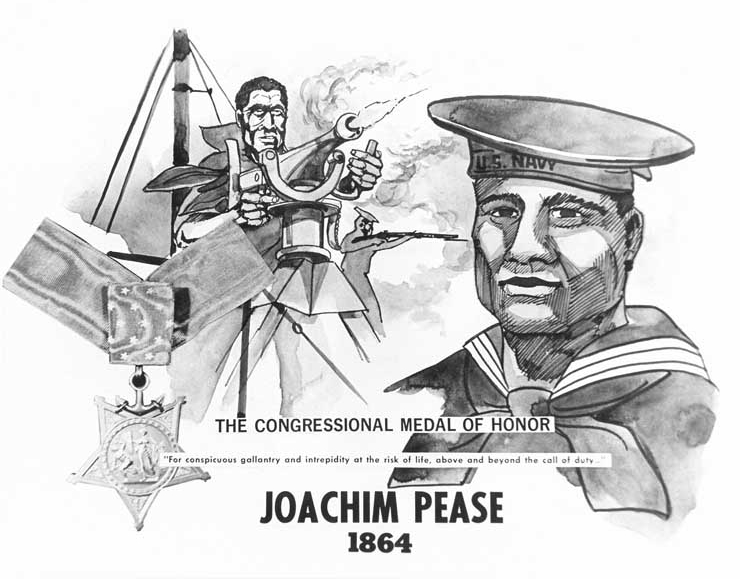
- A U.S. Navy poster featuring Pease
- Born: 1842
- Military career
- Allegiance: United States: Union
- Branch: United States Navy: Union Navy
- Service years: 1862-1865
- Rank: Seaman
- Unit: USS Kearsarge
- Conflicts: American Civil War; *Sinking of CSS Alabama
- Awards: Medal of Honor

Joachim Pease (born 1842, date of death unknown) was a United States Navy sailor and a recipient of America's highest military decoration—the Medal of Honor—for his actions in the American Civil War.

== Biography ==
Although Joachim Pease has been referred to as a native of Long Island, New York, recently unearthed records in the National Archives show that when he enlisted in the United States Navy as an Ordinary Seaman on January 12, 1862 for a three-year hitch, he listed his birthplace as Fogo Island which is probably Fogo Island, Cape Verde. He was described as twenty years old, five feet, six and a half inches tall, with black hair and eyes and a "negro" complexion.

Joachim Pease enlisted in the Navy from New Bedford, Massachusetts, not New York City, as commonly reported, and served on board USS Kearsarge during the Civil War.

On June 19, 1864, off the coast of Cherbourg, France, Kearsarge battled the Confederate sloop-of-war CSS Alabama. In a report on the third division, he was described:

But among those showing still higher qualifications I am pleased to name ... also Robert Strahan (captain top), first captain of No. 1 gun; James H. Lee, sponger, and Joachim Pease (colored seaman), loader of same gun. The conduct of the latter in battle fully sustained his reputation as one of the best men in the ship.

— D.H. Sumner, Acting Master, June 20, 1864

For his conduct during the Battle of Cherbourg, Pease was awarded the Medal of Honor. He left the Navy at the end of his enlistment in 1865 never having received his Medal of Honor. His final fate is unknown, and speculations that he may have resumed life in the merchant navy or returned to Fogo Island remains unproven.

Pease's Medal of Honor is on display in the National Museum of the United States Navy, located in the Washington Navy Yard, Washington, D.C.. The medal is slated to be handed over to any possible descendants.

== Medal of Honor citation ==
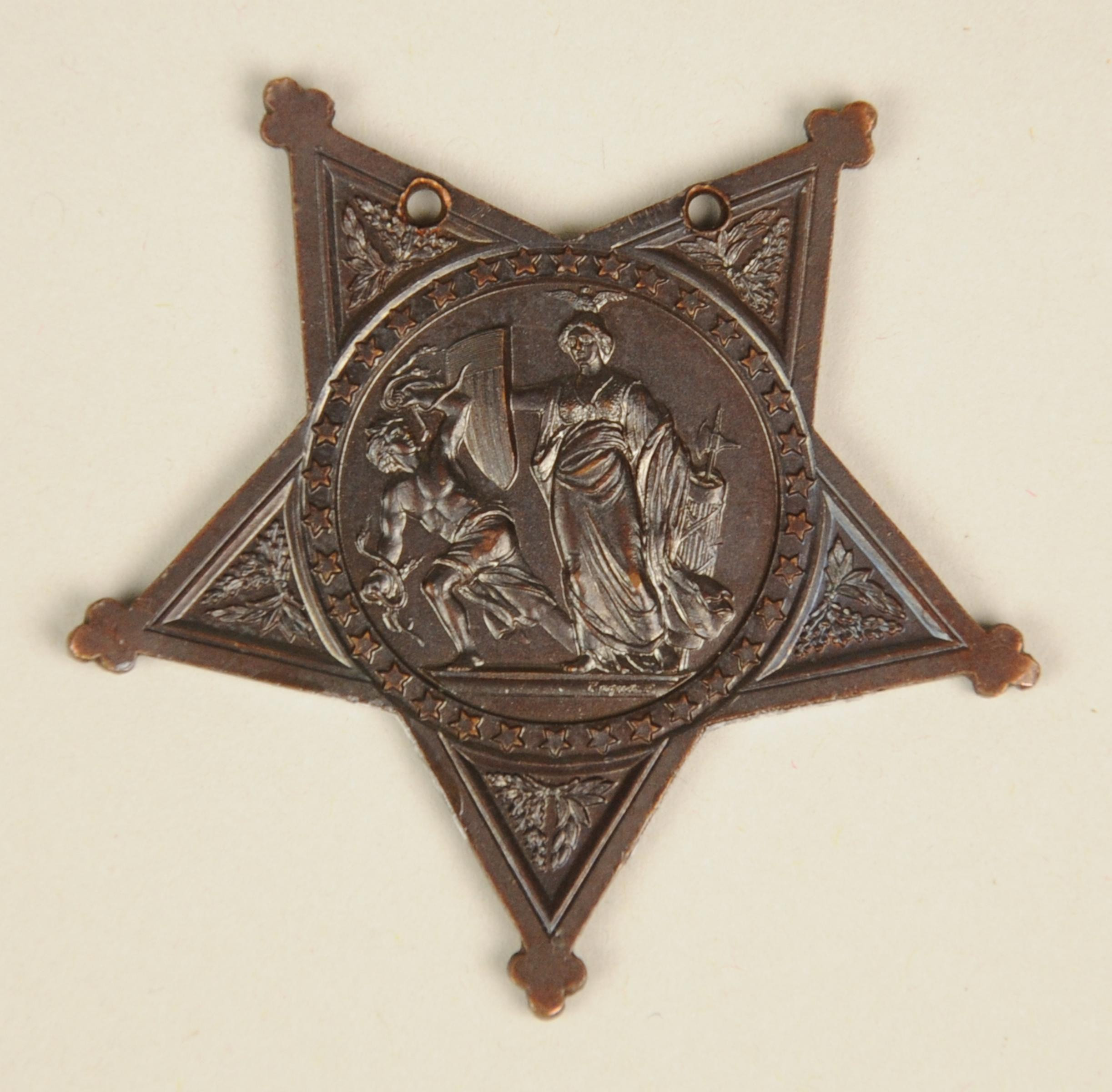
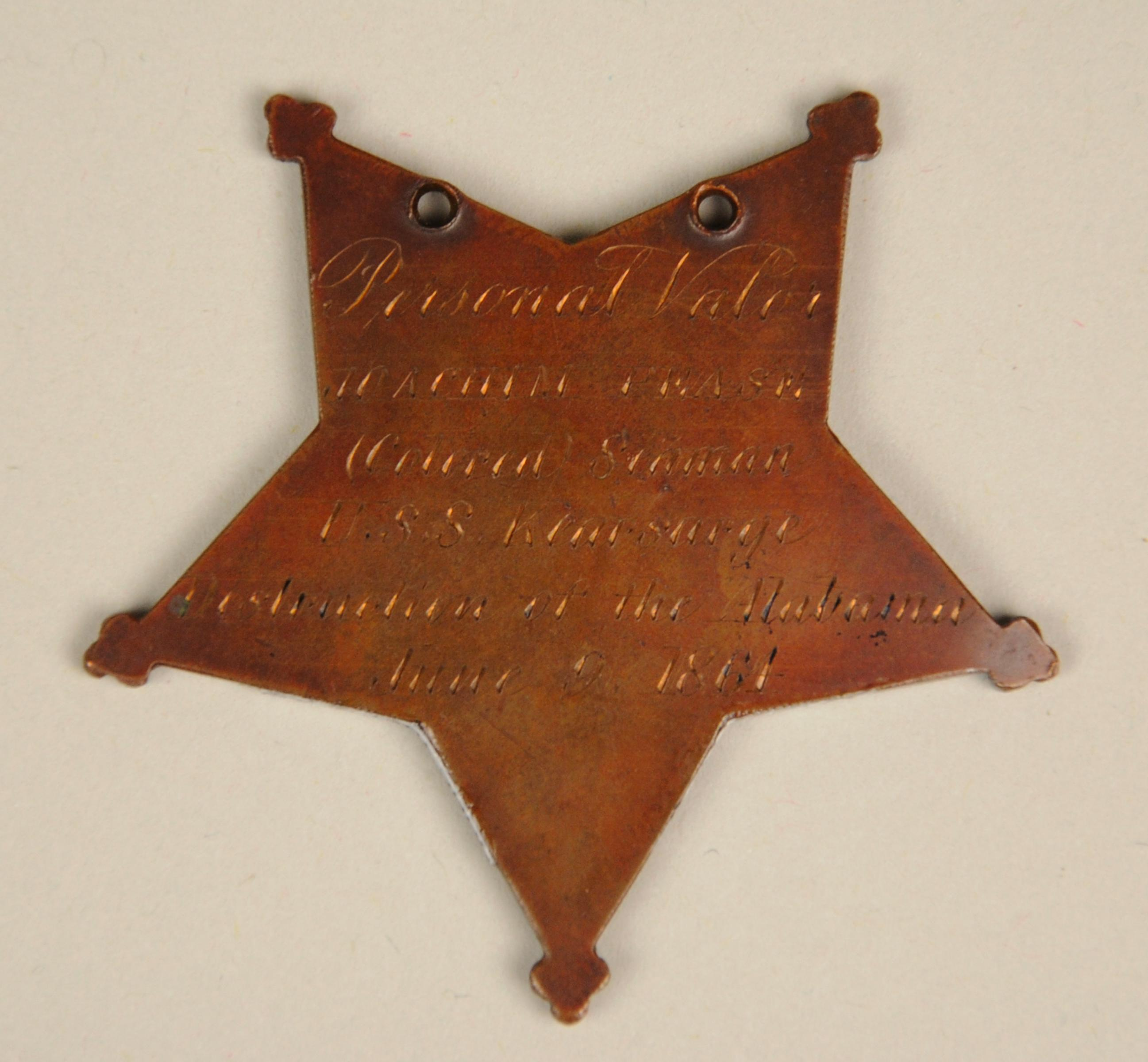
Pease's Medal of Honor, front and back

Rank and Organization: Seaman, U.S. Navy.
Born: Long Island, N.Y.
Accredited To: New York.
General Order No. 45 (December 31, 1864).

Citation:

Served as seaman on board the U.S.S. Kearsarge when she destroyed the Alabama off Cherbourg, France, 19 June 1864. Acting as loader on the No. 2 gun during this bitter engagement, Pease exhibited marked coolness and good conduct and was highly recommended by the divisional officer for gallantry under fire.

== Gallery ==
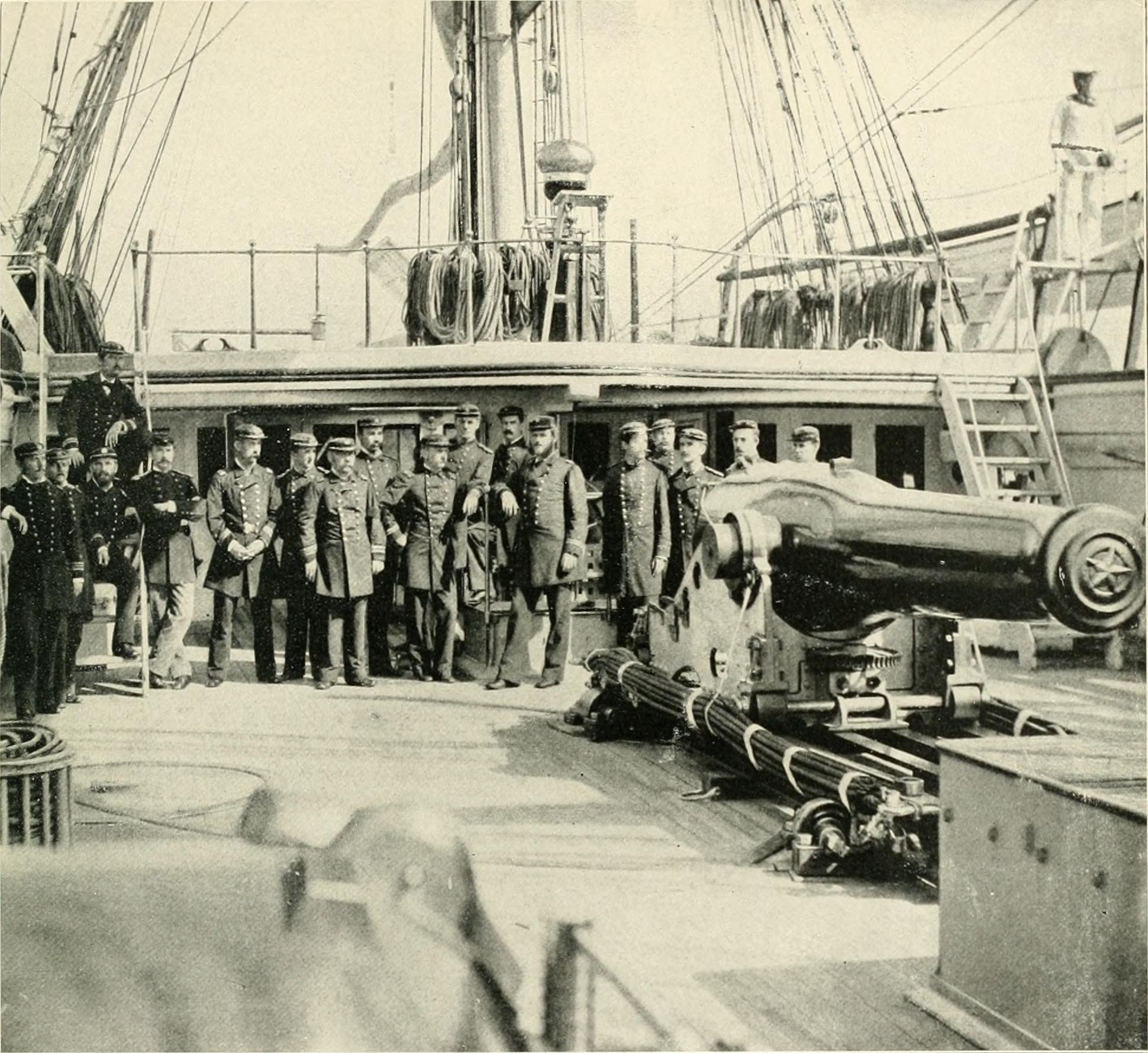
The aft 11 inch gun on the Kearsarge used against the CSS Alabama

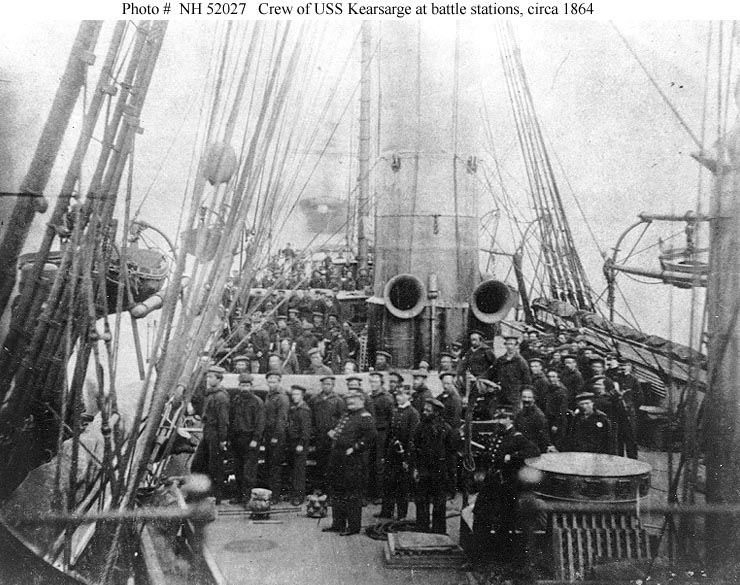
Crew with their guns, soon after the June 1864 action with CSS Alabama

== See also ==
- List of American Civil War Medal of Honor recipients: M–P
- List of African American Medal of Honor recipients
