= William B. Poole =

American Civil War sailor and Medal of Honor recipient

- Born: 1833; Cape Elizabeth, Maine
- Died: August 1904 (aged 70–71); Lynn, Massachusetts
- Burial place: Pine Grove Cemetery; Lynn, Massachusetts
- Military career
- Allegiance: United States of America; Union
- Branch: United States Navy; Union Navy
- Rank: Seaman; Quartermaster
- Unit: USS Kearsarge
- Conflicts: American Civil War; Battle of Cherbourg (1864)
- Awards: Medal of Honor

William B. Poole (1833–1904) was an American sailor who received the Medal of Honor for valor in action during the American Civil War.

Poole was born in Maine in 1833. On June 19, 1864, he was serving as a quartermaster on the sloop of war USS Kearsarge when she sank the commerce raider CSS Alabama off Cherbourg, France. He was awarded his Medal of Honor for gallantry under fire exhibited while steering the ship.

Poole died on August 15, 1904 and is buried in Pine Grove Cemetery in Lynn, Massachusetts. Fellow Civil War Medal of Honor recipient John G. B. Adams is buried in the same cemetery.

== Medal of Honor citation ==
Rank and organization: Quartermaster, U.S. Navy. Born: 1833 Maine. Accredited to: Maine. G.O. No.: 45, December 31, 1864.

Citation:

Service as quartermaster on board the U.S.S. Kearsarge when she destroyed the Alabama off Cherbourg, France, 19 June 1864. Stationed at the helm, Poole steered the ship during the engagement in a cool and most creditable manner and was highly commended by his divisional officer for his gallantry under fire.

== See also ==
- List of Medal of Honor recipients
- List of American Civil War Medal of Honor recipients: M–P
- The Battle of the Kearsarge and the Alabama (painting)
