= David Pole =

David Pole may refer to:

- David Pole (politician) (1877–1952), British lawyer and politician
- David Pole (bishop), English Roman Catholic churchman and jurist
- David Pole (economist) (1926–2021), English health economist and civil servant

== See also ==
- David Pohle, German composer
- David Poole (disambiguation)
