= Battle of Cherbourg (1864) =

1864 American Civil War naval battle

- Part of the American Civil War
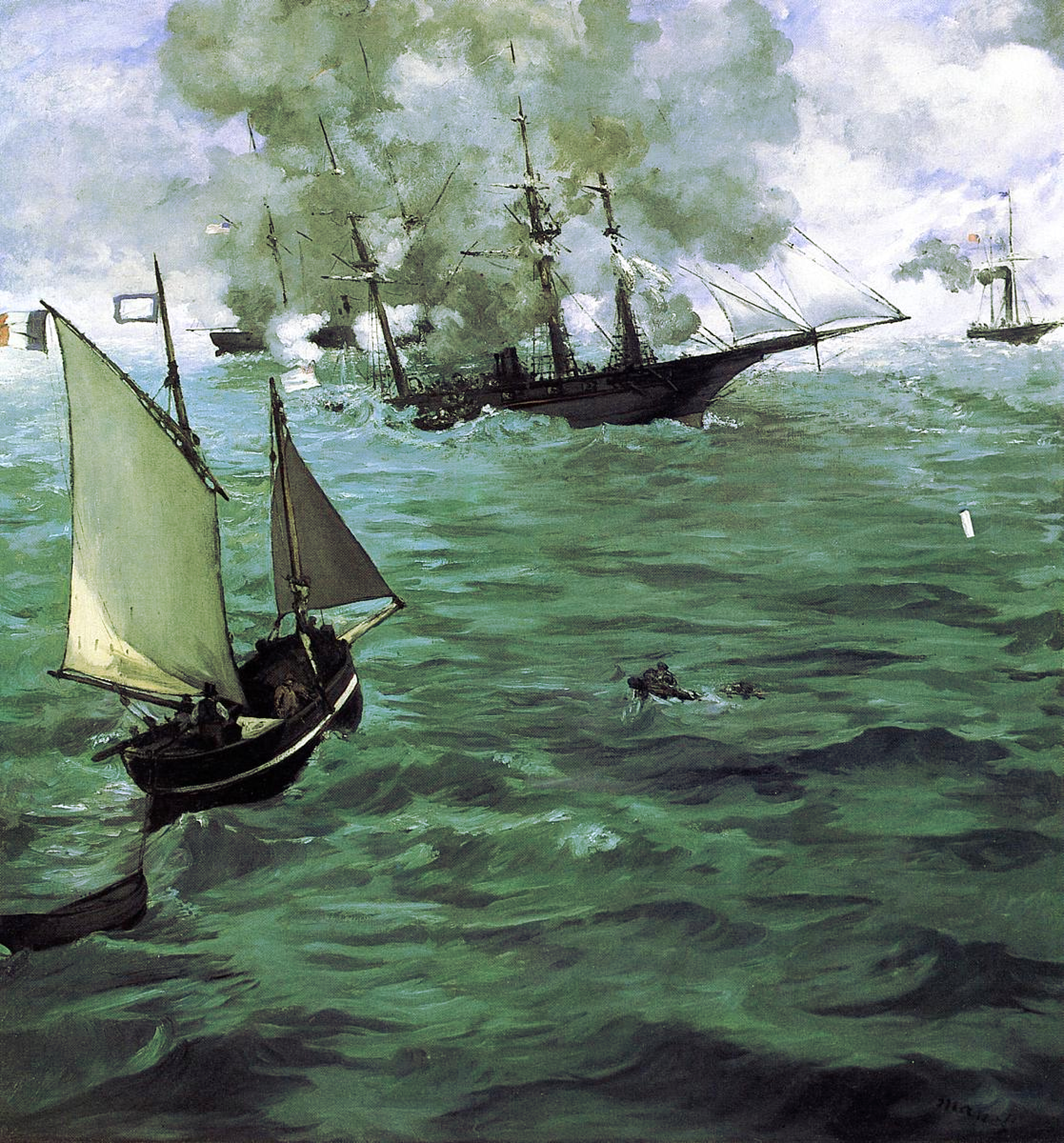
- The Battle of the Kearsarge and the Alabama (1864), by Édouard Manet
Date	June 19, 1864
Location	off Cherbourg, France
Result	Union victory

Belligerents
United States	(Confederate States of America) Confederate States

Commanders and leaders
(United States) John Winslow	(Confederate States of America) Raphael Semmes

Units involved
USS Kearsarge	CSS Alabama

Strength
1 screw sloop-of-war 163 sailors	1 screw sloop-of-war 149 sailors

Casualties and losses
1 died of wounds 2 wounded	Alabama sunk 19 died (9 KIA, 10 drowned); 21 wounded ~70 captured ~38 to 41 Confederate sailors were rescued by a British yacht and escaped capture.

The Battle of Cherbourg, or sometimes the Battle off Cherbourg or the Sinking of CSS Alabama, was a single-ship action fought during the American Civil War between the United States Navy warship, USS Kearsarge, and the Confederate States Navy warship, CSS Alabama, on June 19, 1864, off Cherbourg, France.

== Background ==
After five successful commerce raiding missions in the Atlantic Ocean, CSS Alabama put into Cherbourg Harbor on June 11, 1864. The Confederate States sloop-of-war was commanded by Captain Raphael Semmes, formerly of CSS Sumter. It was Captain Semmes' intention to drydock his ship and receive repairs at the French port. As related by the ship's Executive Master, John McIntosh Kell, "[The Alabama] was now showing signs of the active work she had been doing. Her boilers were burned out, and her machinery was sadly in want of repairs. She was loose at every joint, her seams were open, and the copper on her bottom was in roll." The Confederate Navy vessel was crewed by about 149 men and armed with six 32-pounder (15 kg) cannon, mounted broadside, three guns per side; two heavy pivot guns, mounted on the centerline and able to fire to either side; one 8-inch (203 mm), 110-pound (50 kg) smoothbore gun; and one 7-inch (178 mm), 68-pound (31 kg) rifled gun. Alabama had been pursued for two years by the screw sloop-of-war USS Kearsarge, under Captain John Winslow. Kearsarge was armed with two 11-inch (279 mm) smoothbore Dahlgren guns which fired about 166 pounds of solid shot, four 32-pound guns, and one 30-pounder Parrott rifle. She was crewed by around 163 sailors and officers.

Kearsarge had a form of makeshift armor-cladding, medium-weight chain cable triced in tiers along her port and starboard midsections, basically acting as the equivalent of chain mail for vulnerable sections of her hull, where shot could potentially penetrate and hit her boilers or steam engine. This armor protection potentially gave the Union warship a definitive advantage over the Confederate raider; however, the armor was only capable of stopping shots from Alabama's lighter 32-pound balls; either of her heavier guns could easily penetrate such lightweight protection. In the event, it was a moot point, as Alabama only managed to score two hits in this area, both of which were well above the waterline and the vulnerable engineering areas, and would have done little lasting damage even if they had successfully penetrated the hull.

On June 14, Kearsarge finally caught up with Alabama as she was receiving repairs. Kearsarge did not attack, as Alabama was in a neutral port; instead, she waited, initiating a blockade of CSS Alabama in Cherbourg. Union Captain Winslow telegraphed USS St. Louis to request her assistance, but the fighting began before she could arrive. Confederate Captain Semmes used the time to drill his men for the coming battle. On June 19, Alabama, with nowhere else to go, ran up the Stars and Bars and exited the harbor to attack Kearsarge. She was escorted by the French Navy ironclad Couronne, whose mission was to ensure that the ensuing battle occurred outside the French harbor.

== Battle ==
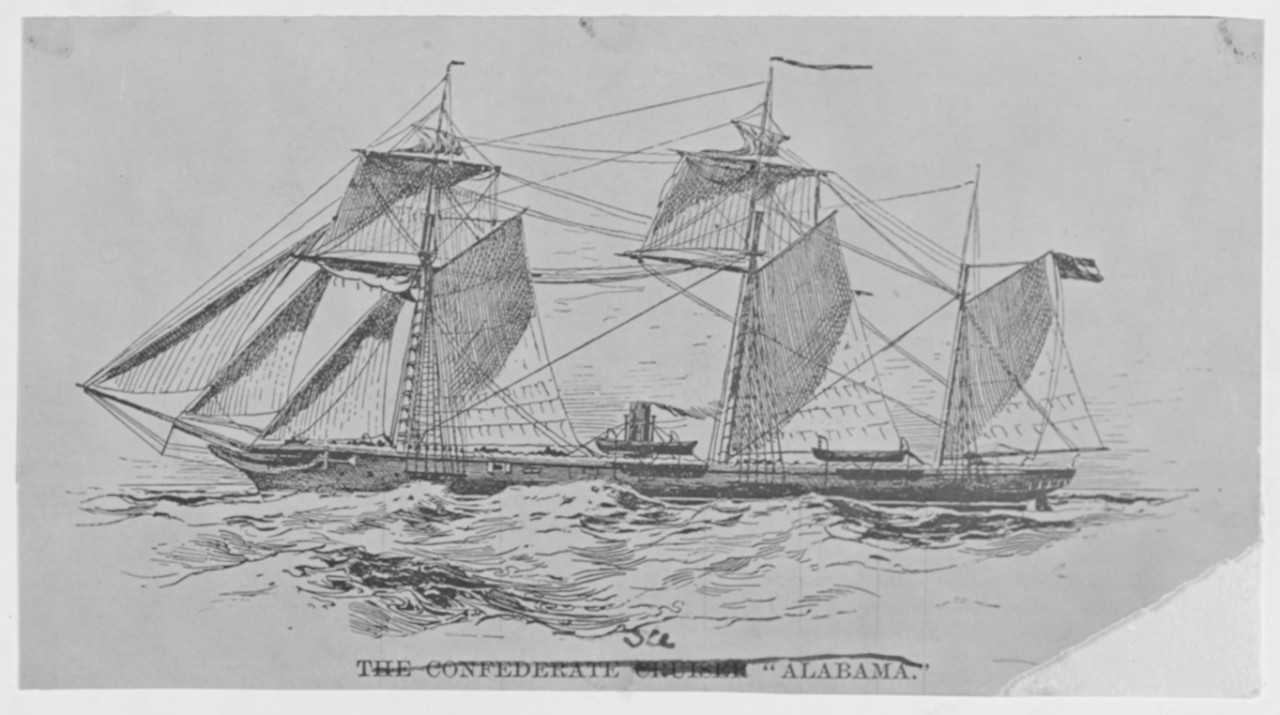
CSS Alabama This sketch was made from a photograph (of a drawing) which Captain Semmes gave to a friend, with the remark that it was a correct picture of his ship. (Battles and Leaders of the Civil War Vol 4 p.601)

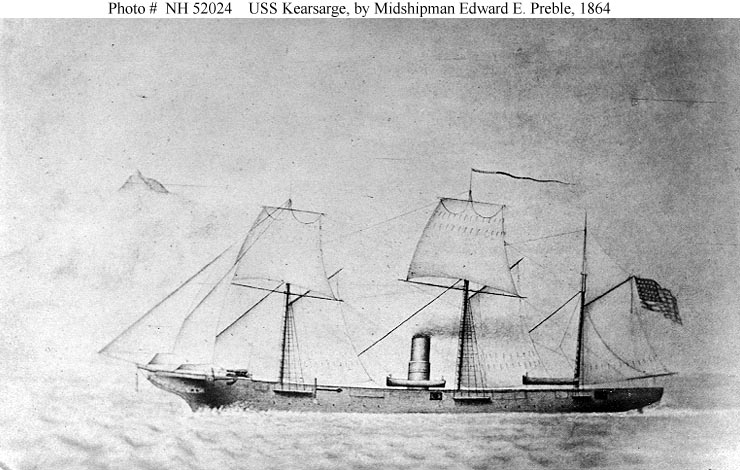
THE UNITED STATES SCREW-SLOOP "KEARSARGE" AT THE TIME OF THE ENCOUNTER WITH THE "ALABAMA. "When the Kearsarge was at the Azores, a few months before the fight with the Alabama, Midshipman Edward E. Preble made a mathematically correct drawing of the ship, and from a photograph of that drawing the above picture was made. After the fight alterations were made in the Kearsarge which considerably changed her appearance." (Battles and Leaders of the Civil War Vol IV p.614)

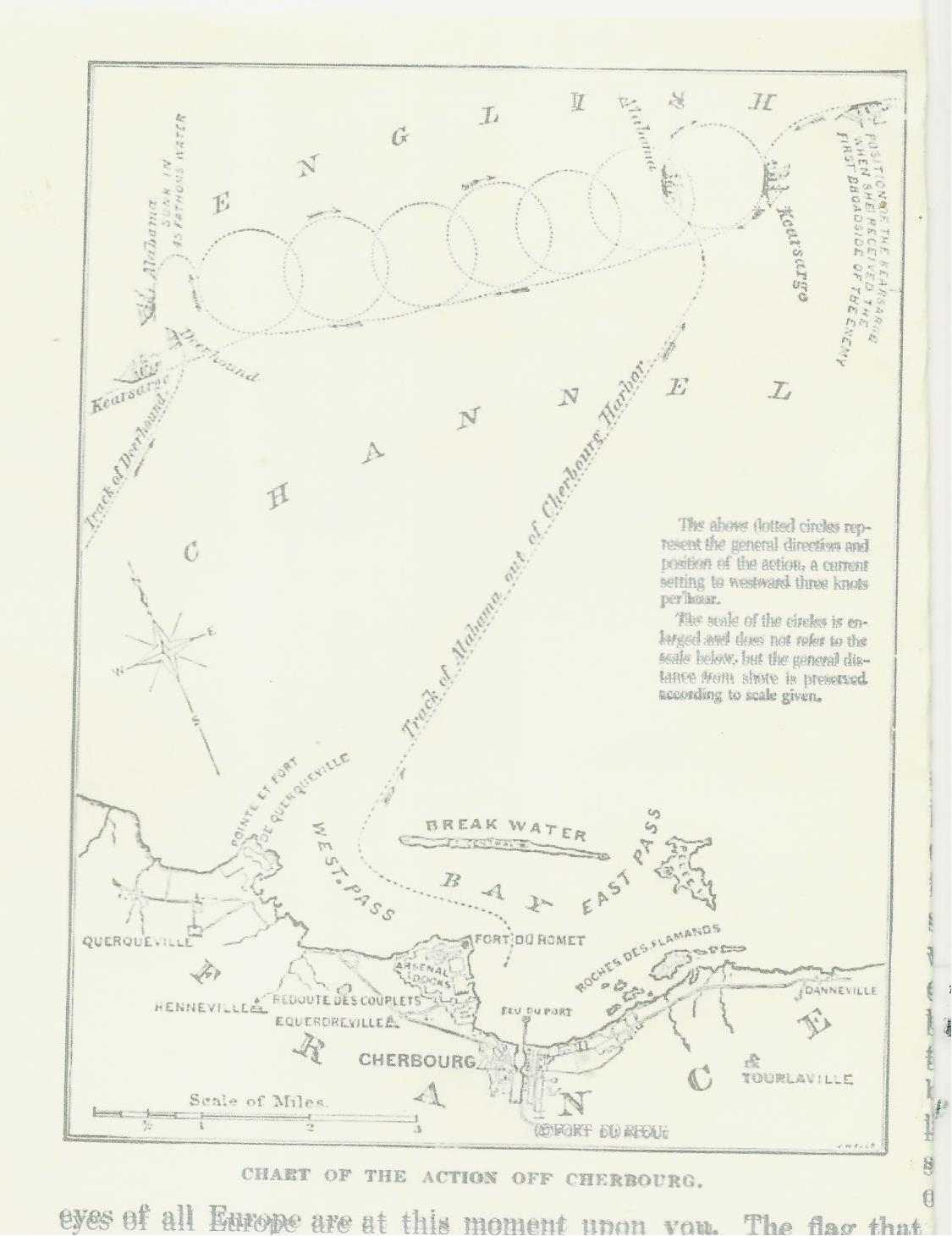
Chart of Battle Between the CSS Alabama and the USS Kearsarge 1864

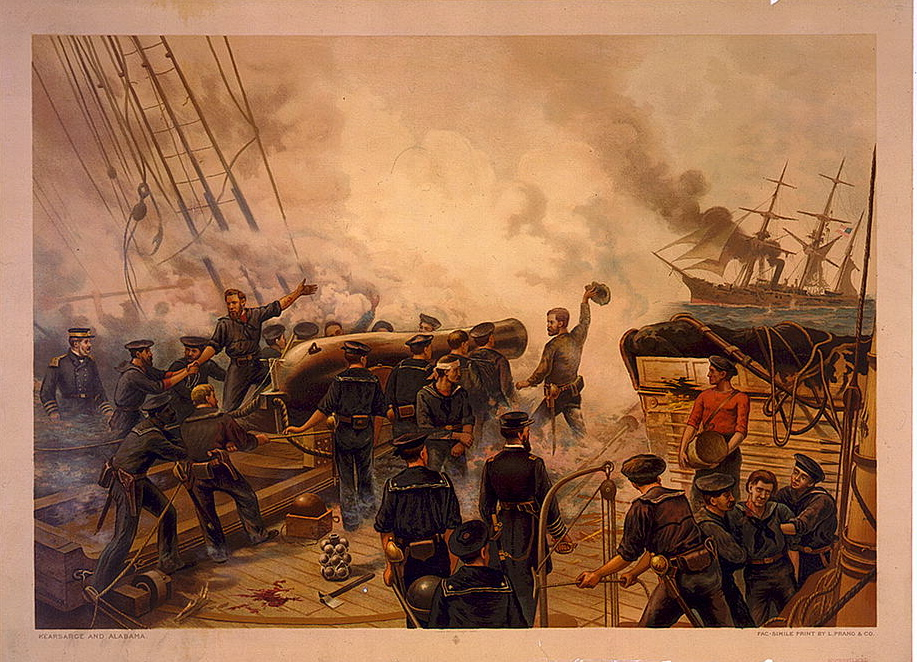
Battle of the USS Kearsarge and the CSS Alabama (1887 lithograph)

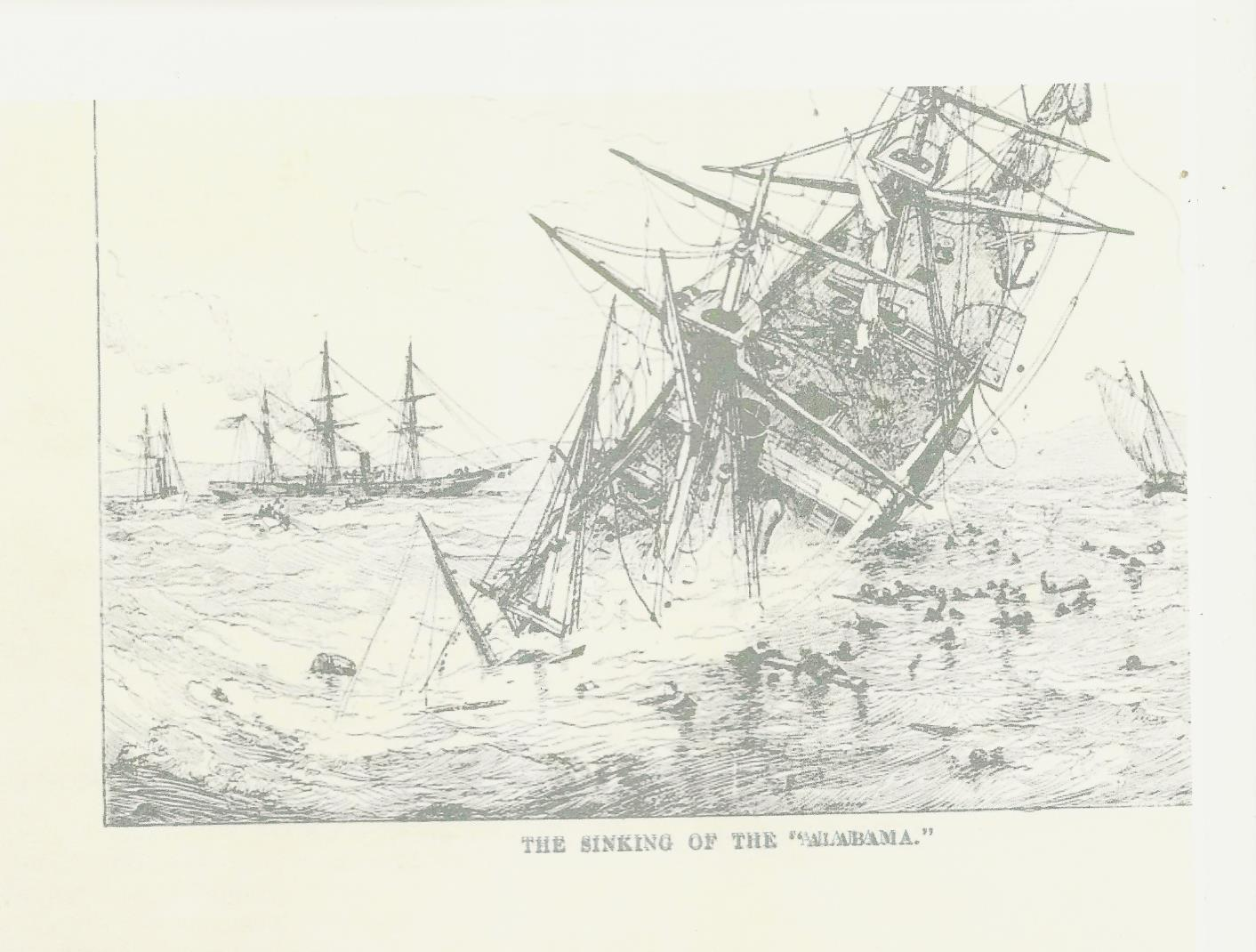
Sinking of the CSS Alabama off Cherbourg France 1864

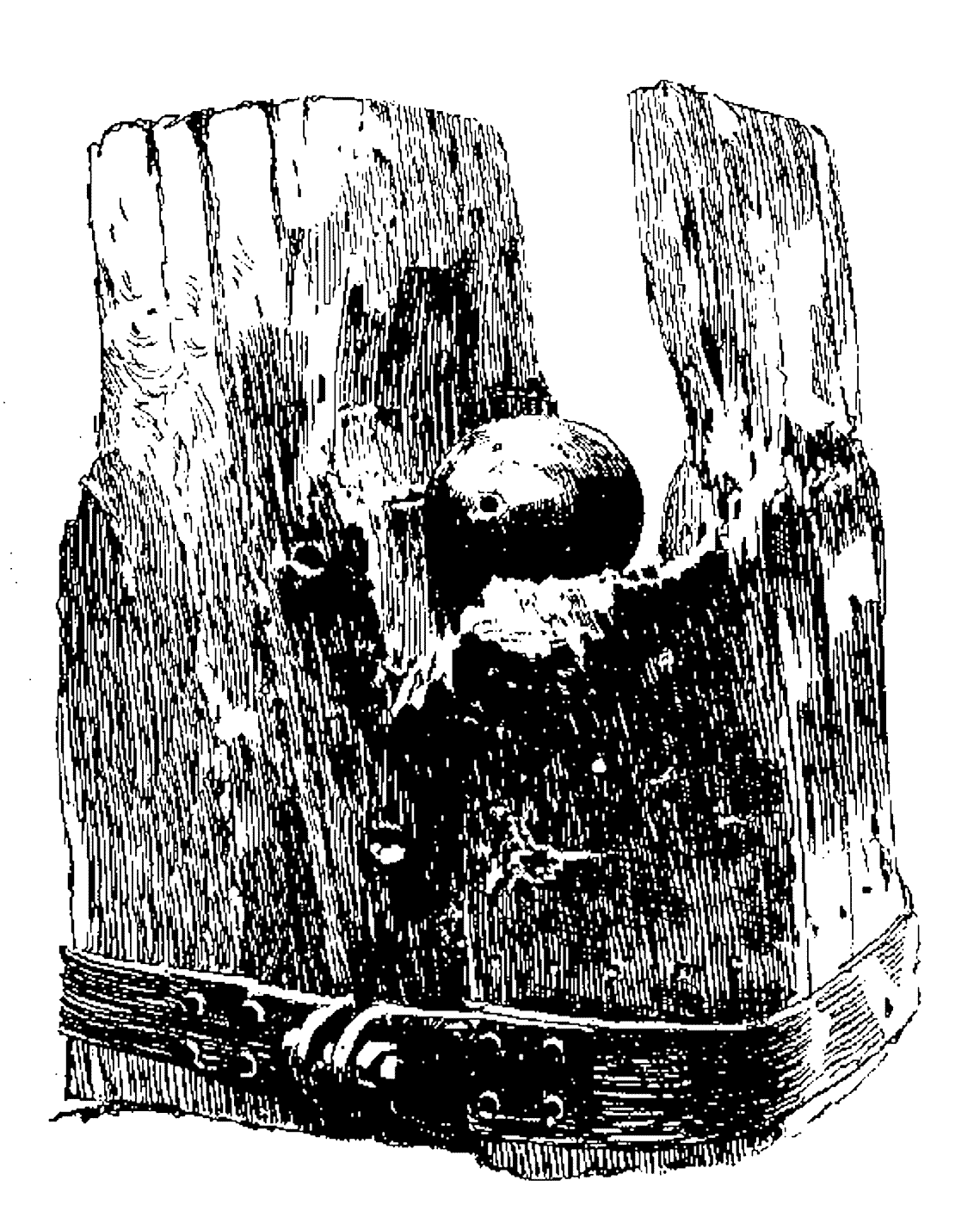
The sternpost of USS Kearsarge, with a 100-pound round embedded within it

Captain Winslow spotted the departing Confederate raider, so he turned his ship around to take the impending battle out of French territorial waters. Once out, Kearsarge turned about again, hoisted the United States Navy Jack, and lined up for a broadside. Captain Winslow ordered his gunners to hold their fire until the range closed. Alabama fired the first shots from the 100-pound pivot gun. They are not known to have hit. Eventually the range closed to within 1,000 yards (910 m) and Kearsarge fired her first shot. The two warships maneuvered on opposite courses throughout the battle. Kearsarge and Alabama made seven spiraling circles around each other, moving southwest in a 3-knot (5.6 km/h; 3.5 mph) current. Both Captain Semmes and Captain Winslow attempted to cross each other's bow, hoping to inflict heavy raking fire. Three of the Kearsarge 11-inch shells entered the Alabama's 8-inch gun port. The Alabama gunpowder was damaged and defective; her guns gave out a dull report with thick and heavy vapor while the Kearsarge battery was clear and sharp with powder burning like thin vapor.

The battle continued in this manner for several minutes; in the meantime, on the French coast, hundreds watched the battle. Kearsarge's armor cladding sustained two hits during the engagement. The first shell, a 32-pounder, struck the starboard gangway, cutting part of the chain armor and denting the wooden planking underneath. The second shot was again a 32-pounder that exploded and broke a link of the chain. Both hits struck the chain five feet above the waterline and therefore did not threaten the boilers or machinery. The gunnery of Kearsarge was reportedly more accurate than that of the Confederates. She fired slowly with well-aimed shots, while Alabama fired rapidly. Alabama fired a total of over 370 rounds during the fighting; it is not known how many Kearsarge fired, but it is known that she fired many fewer than the Confederates did. Eventually, after just over an hour of exchanging artillery fire, Alabama had received shot-holes beneath the waterline from Kearsarge's Dahlgren guns and began to sink. Captain Semmes struck the Confederate colors, but still Kearsarge continued firing until a white flag was seen, raised by one of the Confederate sailors with his hand. The battle was over, so Captain Semmes sent his remaining dinghy to Captain Winslow, to ask for aid.

During the battle, 40 Confederate sailors were casualties (19 killed in action or drowned and 21 wounded). Another seventy or so were picked up by Kearsarge. Thirty or so were rescued by British civilian yacht Deerhound, which Winslow asked to help evacuate Alabama's crew, and three French pilot boats. Semmes and fourteen of his officers were among the sailors rescued by Deerhound. Instead of delivering the captured Confederates to Kearsarge, Deerhound set a course for Southampton, thus enabling Semmes' escape. This angered the Kearsarge's crew, who begged their captain to allow them to open fire on Deerhound. Winslow would not allow this, and the rescued Confederates escaped being captured. Three men were wounded aboard Kearsarge, one of whom died the following day.

== Aftermath ==
=== In art ===
For many years after the battle, Confederate Captain Semmes stated that he would never have chosen to test Kearsarge had he known of her armor-clad protection. Alabama had destroyed or captured dozens of Union merchant vessels during her Atlantic cruises, and when word of Alabama's sinking reached the northeastern United States, many Northerners were joyful. Édouard Manet produced two paintings of the fight, The Battle of the Kearsarge and the Alabama, now at the Philadelphia Museum of Art, and Kearsarge at Boulogne, now at the Metropolitan Museum of Art. American marine artist Xanthus Smith painted six versions of the naval battle. The most famous of these, a massive work exhibited at the 1876 Centennial Exposition, is in the collection of the Union League of Philadelphia.

The 37th album of Les Tuniques Bleues, titled Duel dans la Manche ("Duel in the Channel"), takes place during the Battle of Cherbourg, on USS Kearsarge.

The battle was commemorated in the sea shanty "Roll, Alabama, Roll".

=== Wreck of Alabama ===
In November 1984, the French minesweeper Circé located the wreck of Alabama at a depth of 60 meters (200 ft), a little under 10 kilometers (5.4 nmi; 6.2 mi) north of the western approaches of Cherbourg roads (49°45′9″N 01°41′42″W). Captain Max Guerout later confirmed that the wreck was that of Alabama.

In 1988, a nonprofit organisation named the CSS Alabama Association was created to conduct a scientific survey of the wreck. Although it now lies in French territorial waters, the U.S. government claimed possession on the grounds that the location where Alabama had struck to Kearsarge had not been within French territorial waters at the time of the battle. On 3 October 1989, France and the United States signed an agreement recognising the wreck as a common historic heritage for both nations and established a joint scientific team for its exploration.

On 23 March 1995, the CSS Alabama Association and the Naval History & Heritage Command signed an agreement to accredit the association for the archeological survey of Alabama. In 2002, over 300 samples were recovered, including the ship's bell, guns, part of the ship's structure, furniture, and tableware. In 2004, a human jaw was found under a gun and was subsequently buried in Mobile, Alabama.

== See also ==
- Bahia Incident
- Battle of Havana (1870)
- SS Cantabria
- William B. Poole, Medal of Honor recipient for service on board the U.S.S. Kearsarge in the battle

== Gallery ==
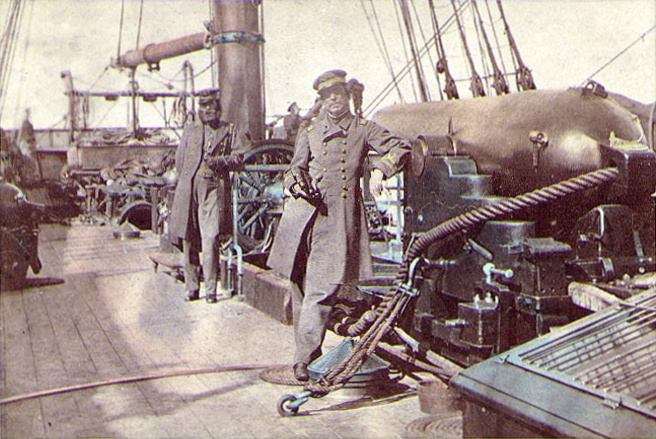
Captain Raphael Semmes, Alabama's commanding officer, standing aft of the mainsail by his ship's aft 8-inch smooth bore gun during her visit to Cape Town in August 1863. His executive officer, First Lieutenant John M. Kell, is in the background, standing by the ship's wheel.

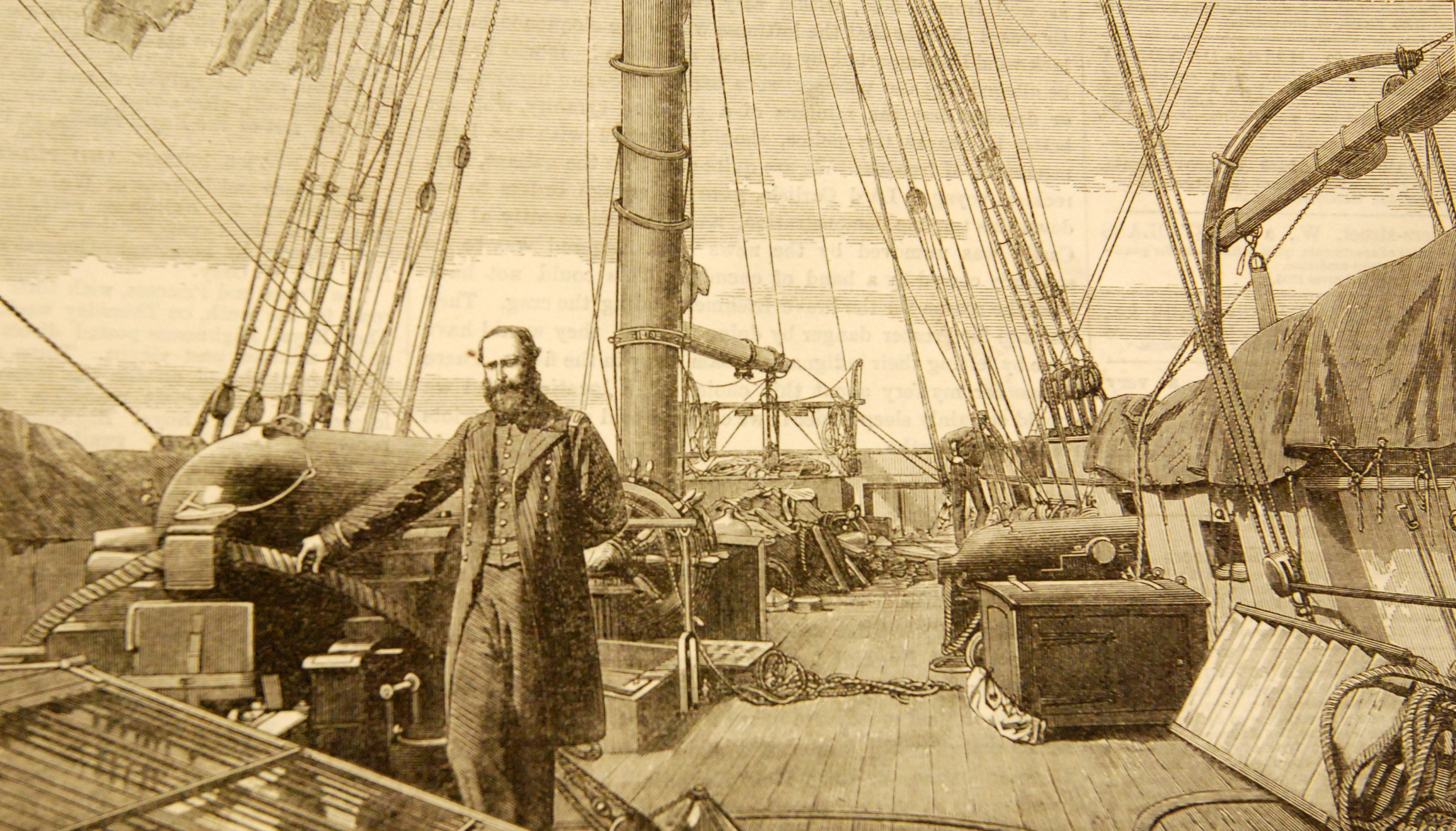
Deck scene cruiser Alabama showing First Lieutenant John M. Kell, by the ships stern during her visit to Cape Town in August 1863.

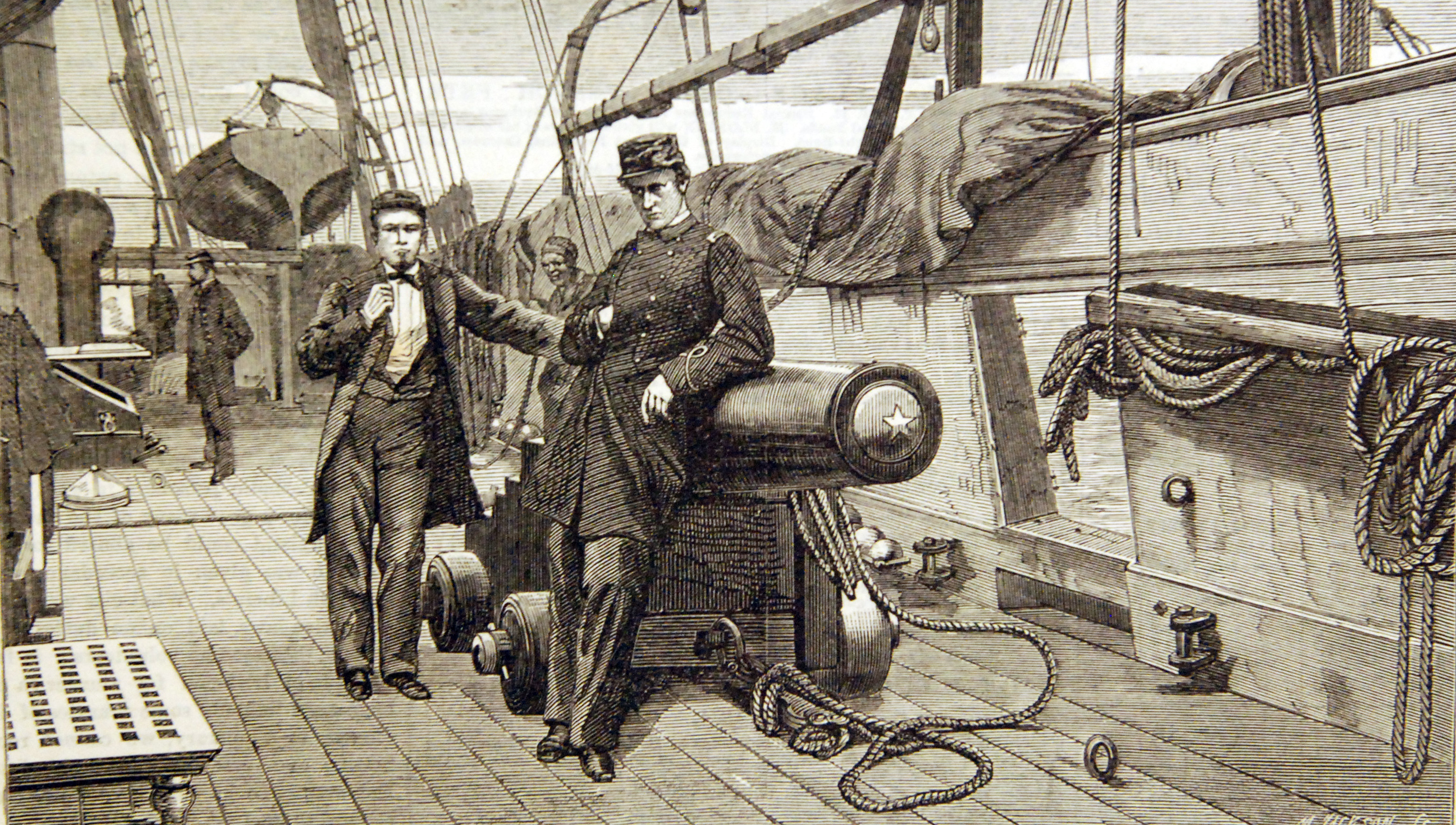
Deck scene cruiser Alabama in August 1863 - Lts Armstrong and Sinclair at Sinclair's 32-pounder station

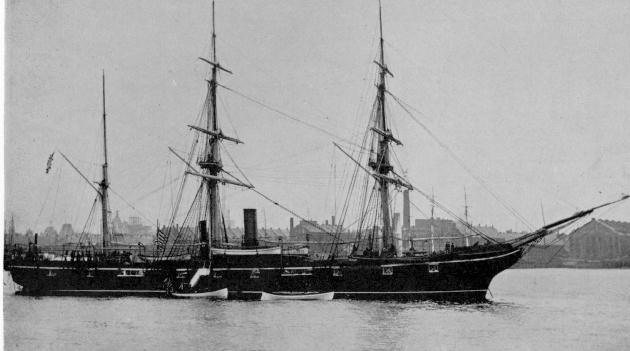
USS Kearsarge, in an 1861 photograph

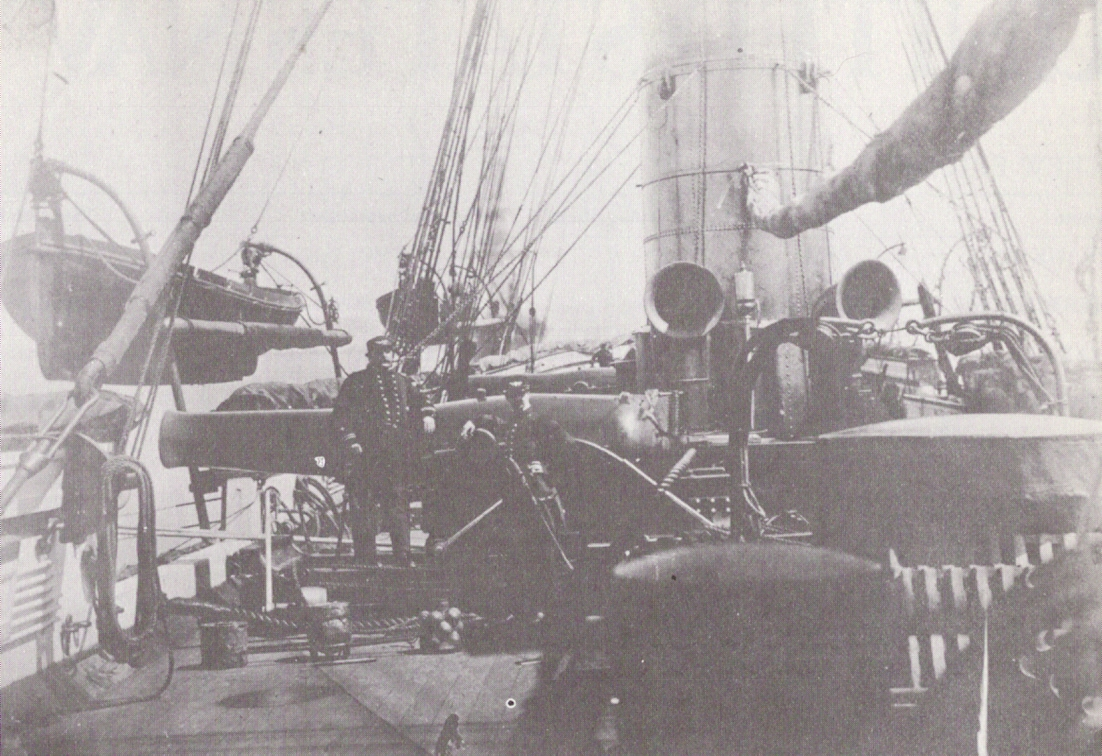
The deck of Kearsarge after her engagement with CSS Alabama

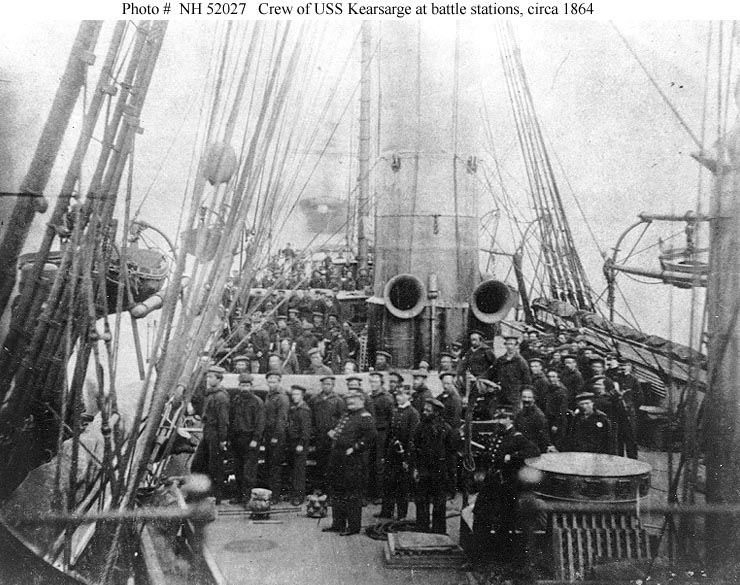
Crew of the USS Kearsarge in 1864 after the battle; showing both 11 Inch guns pointed to starboard as they were during the battle.

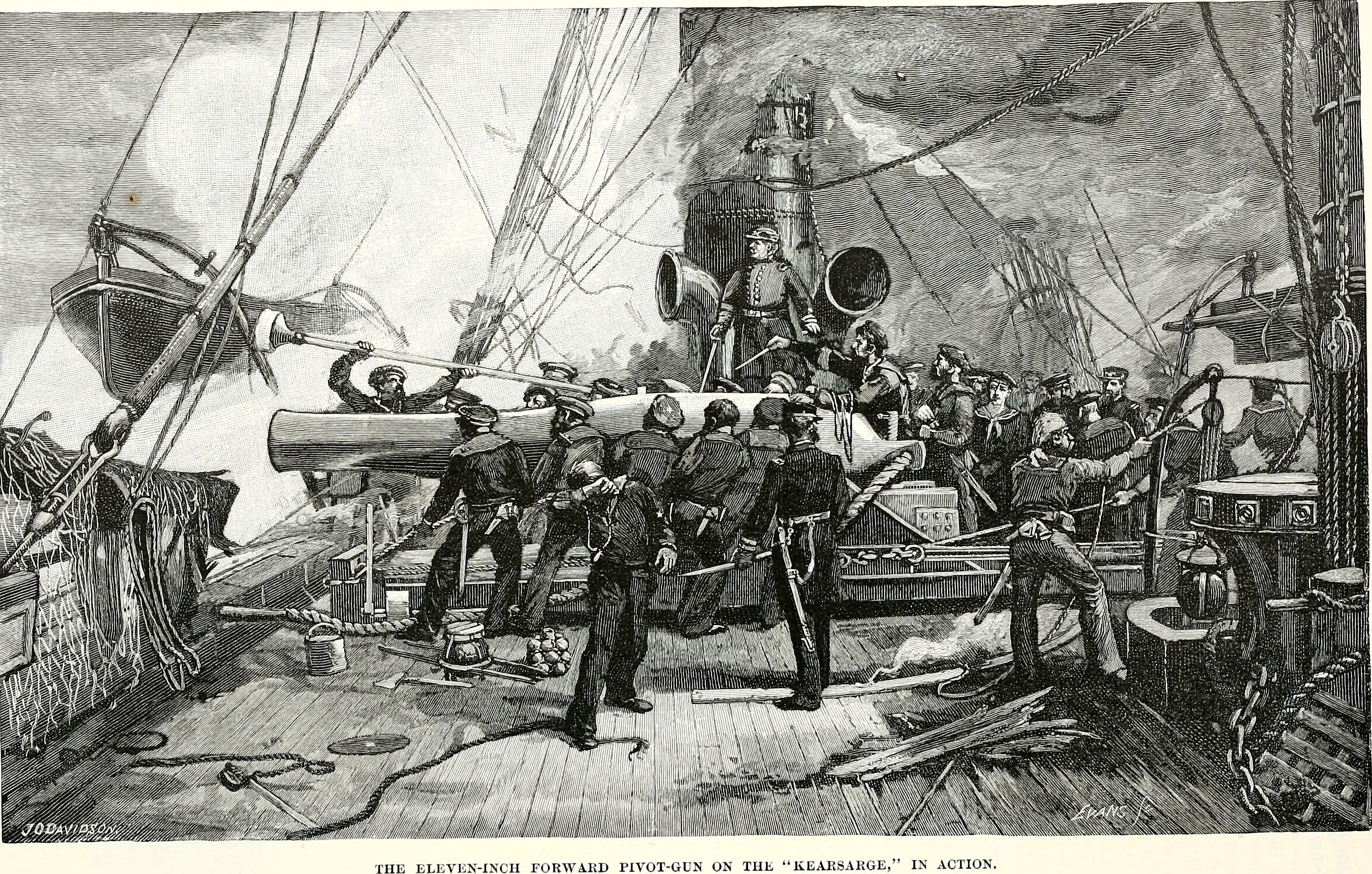
Firing the forward 11 inch gun on the Kearsarge

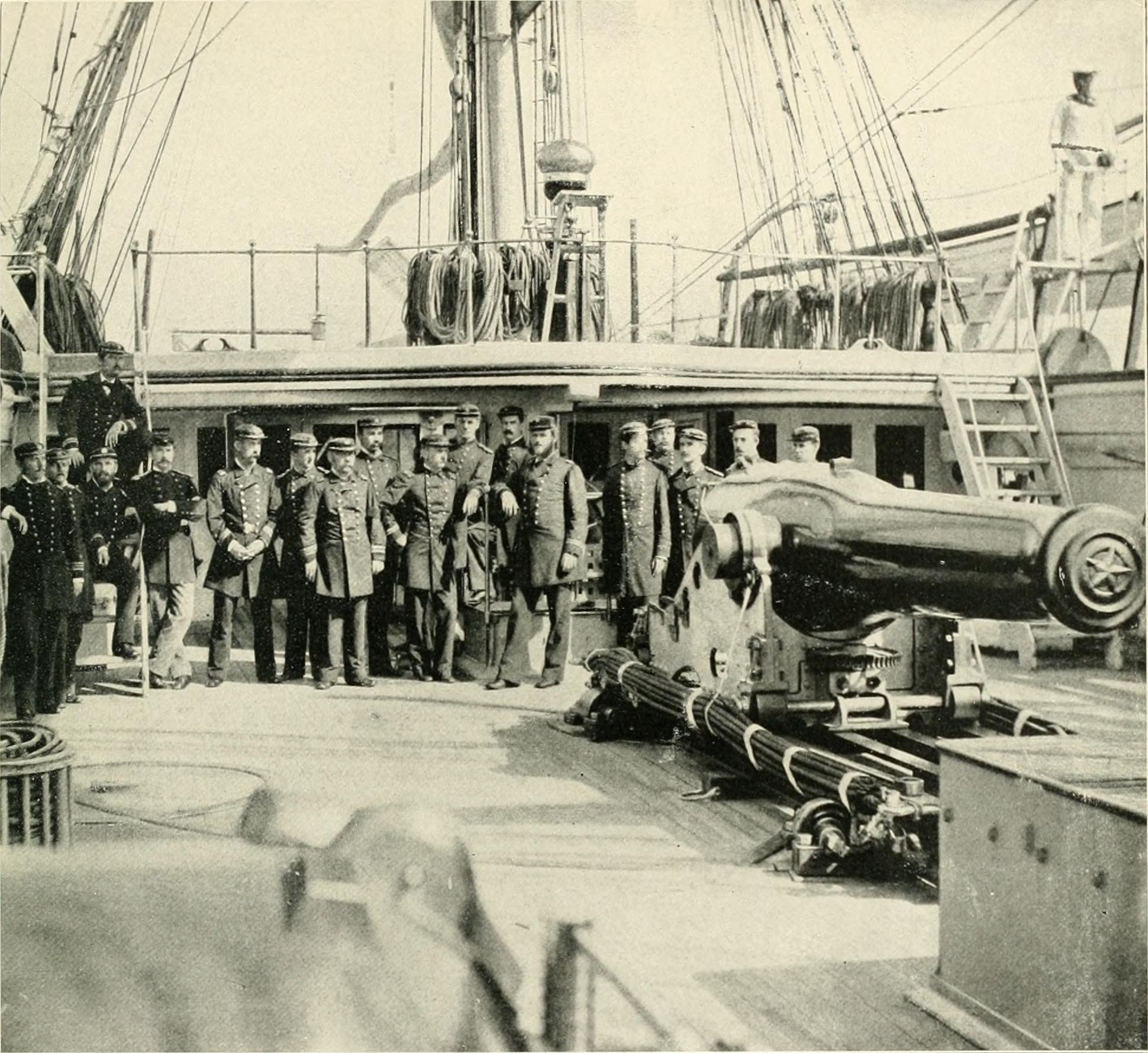
The aft 11 inch gun on the Kearsarge used against the CSS Alabama

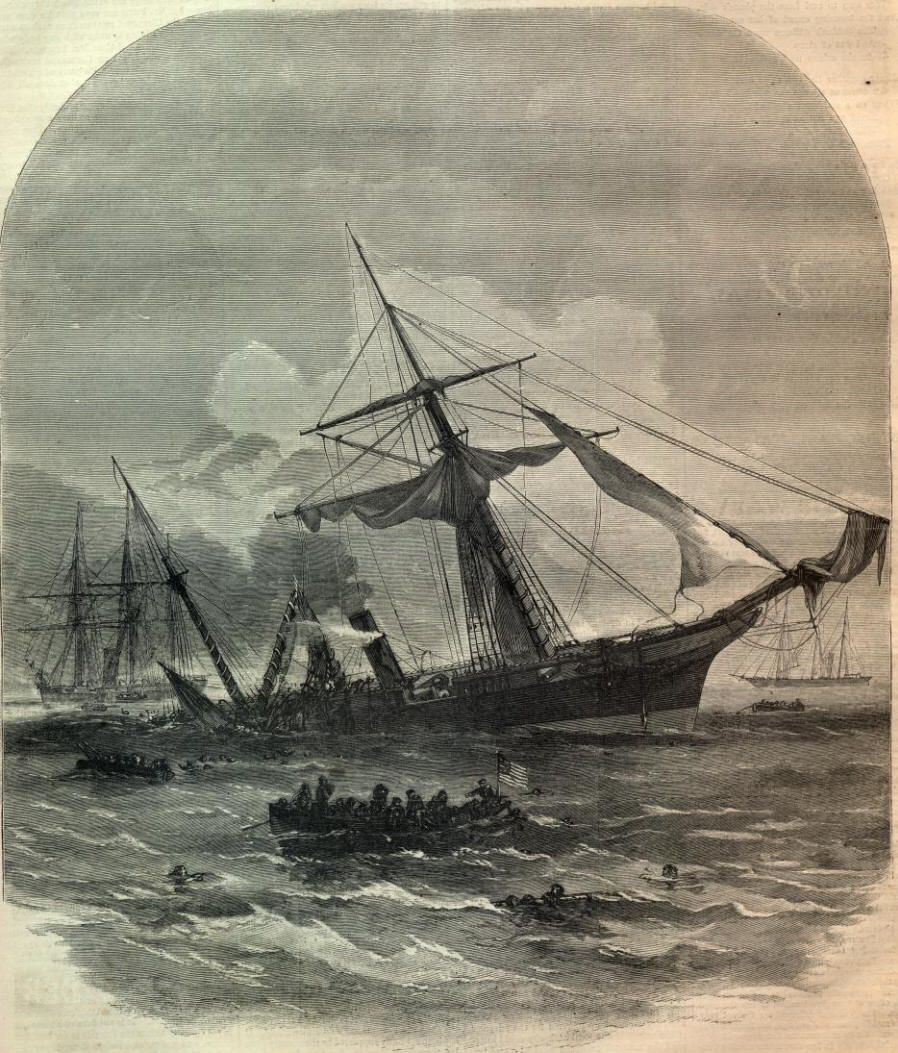
Sinking of the CSS Alabama, engraving, Harper's Weekly Magazine, 23 July 1864

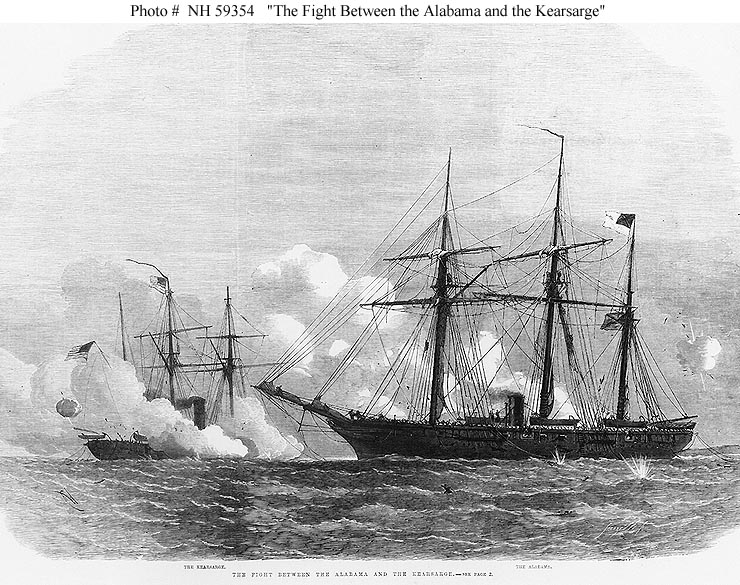
The Fight between the Alabama and the Kearsarge, 1864 engraving

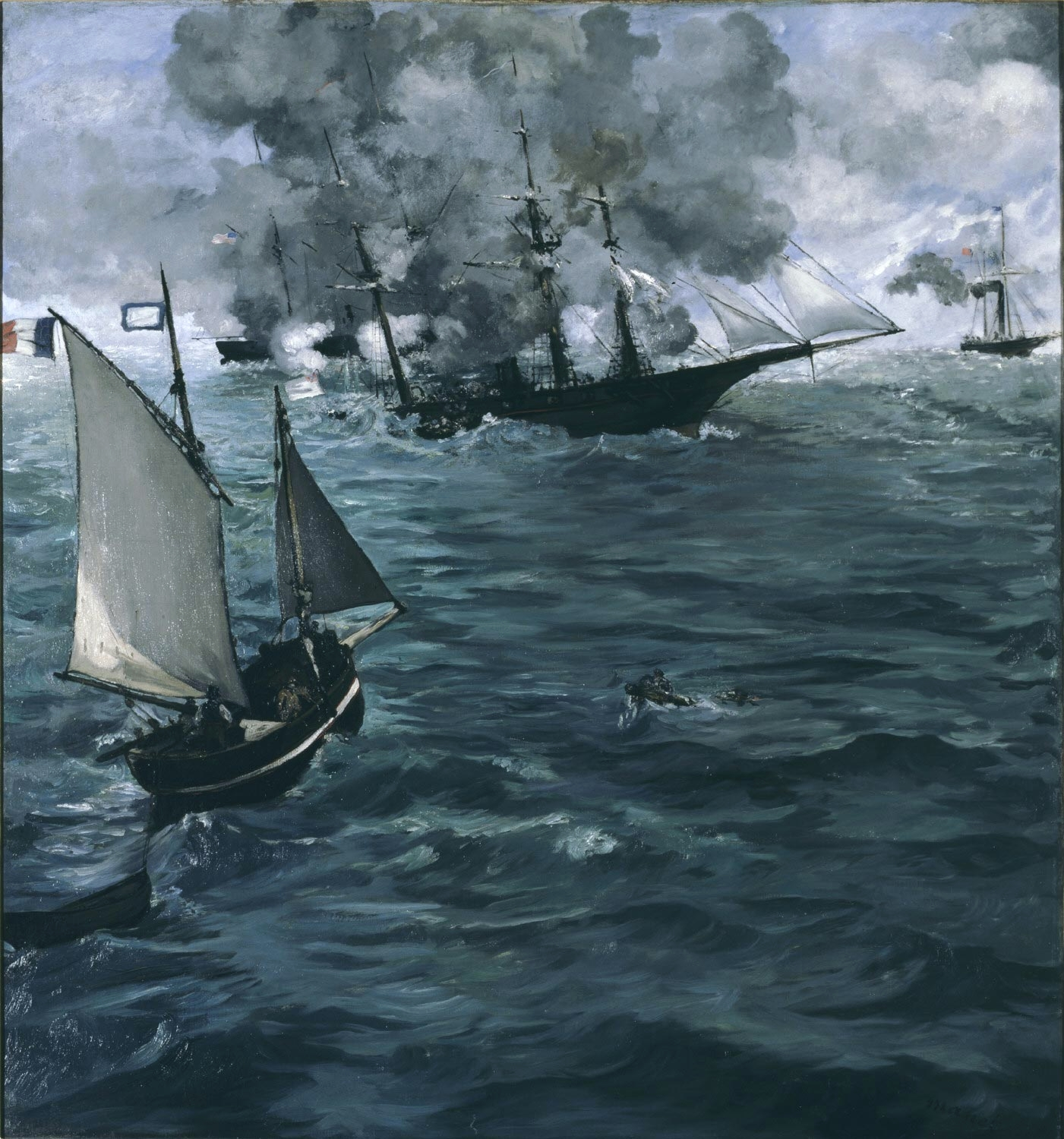
The Battle of the Kearsarge and the Alabama (1864), by Édouard Manet, Philadelphia Museum of Art

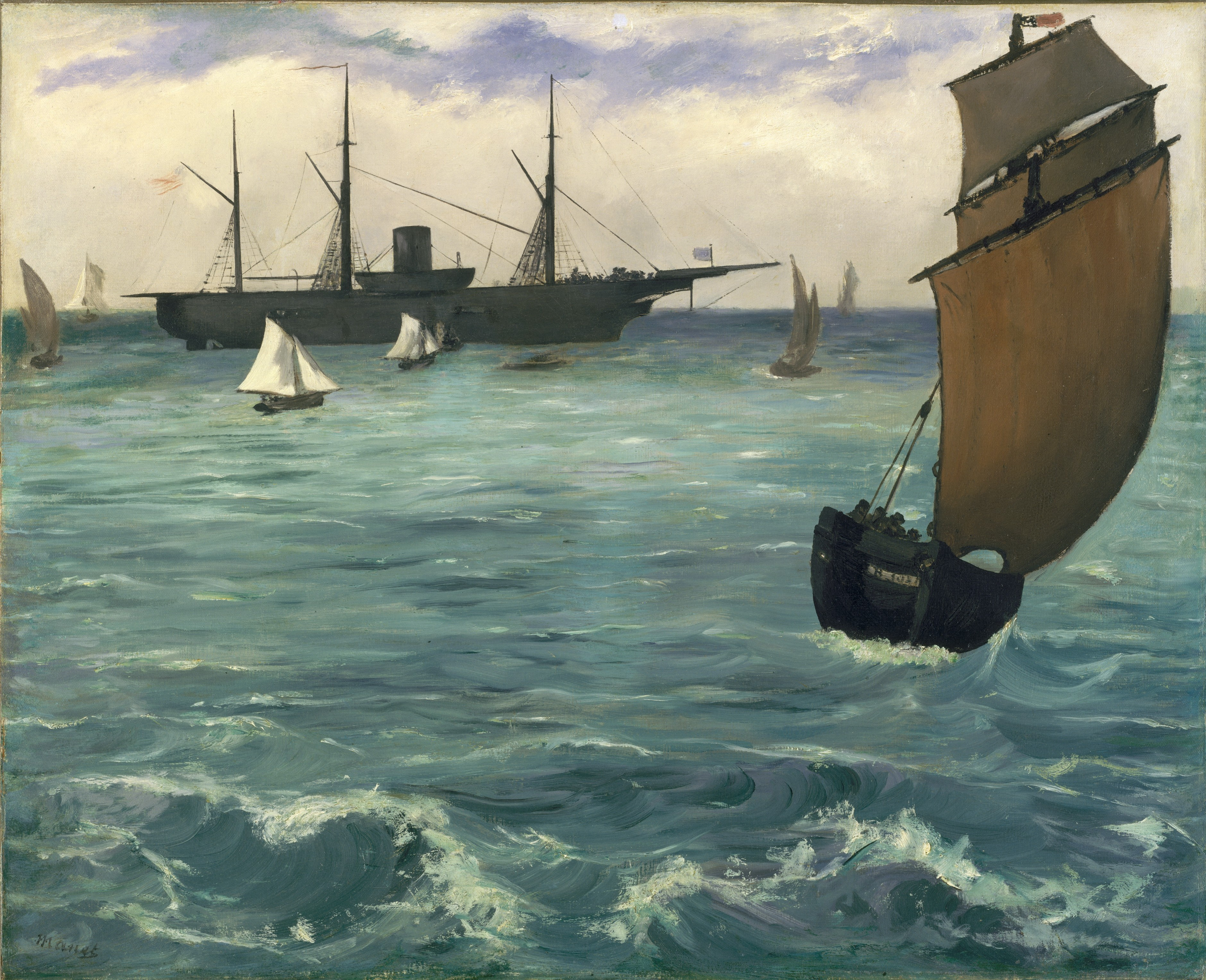
The Kearsarge at Boulogne (1864), by Édouard Manet, Metropolitan Museum of Art

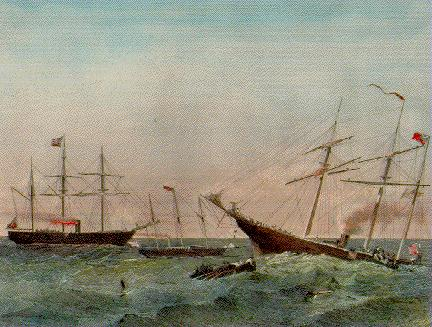
The Sinking of the CSS Alabama, unidentified artist

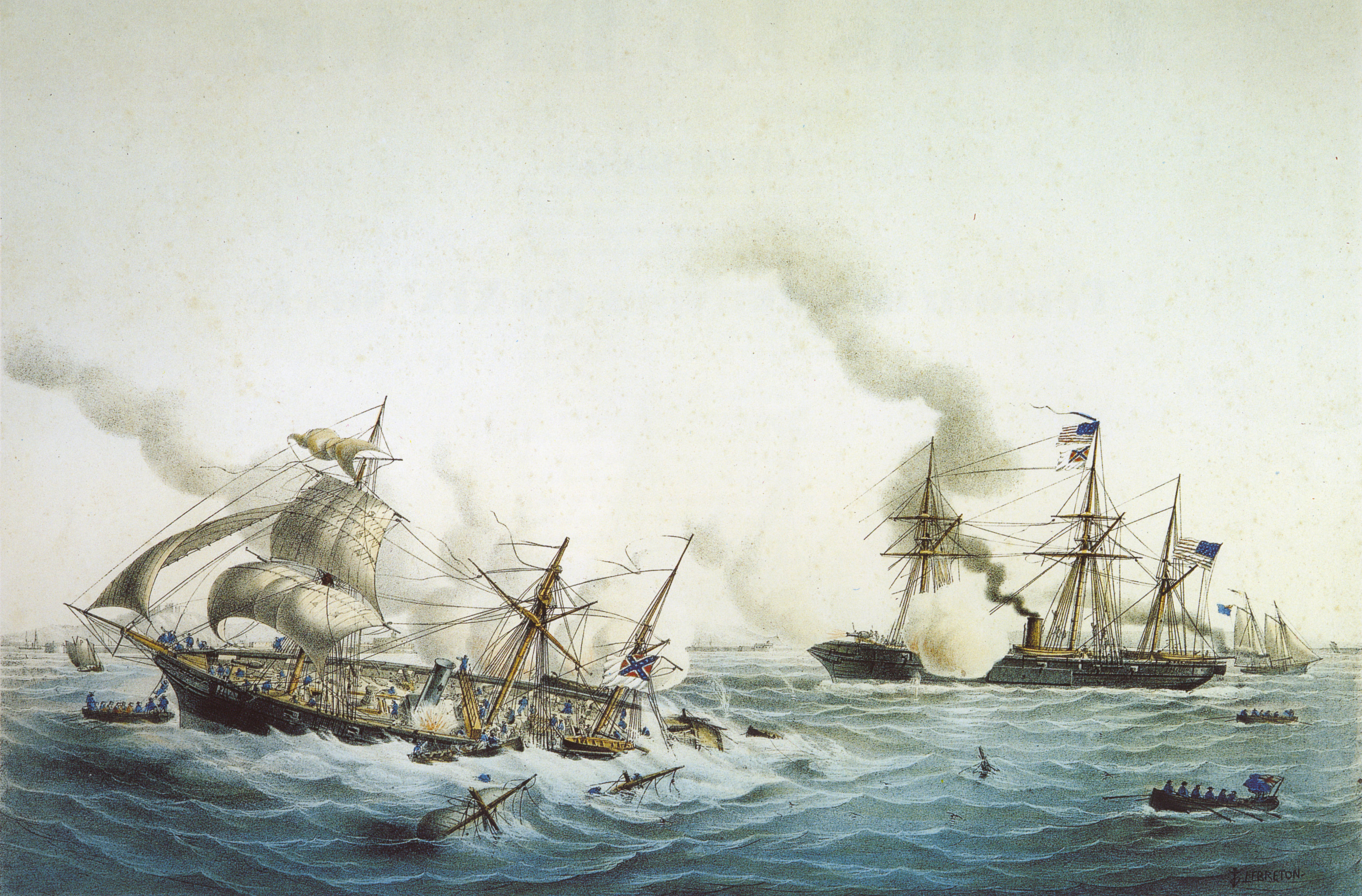
Engraving by Louis Le Breton (by 1866)

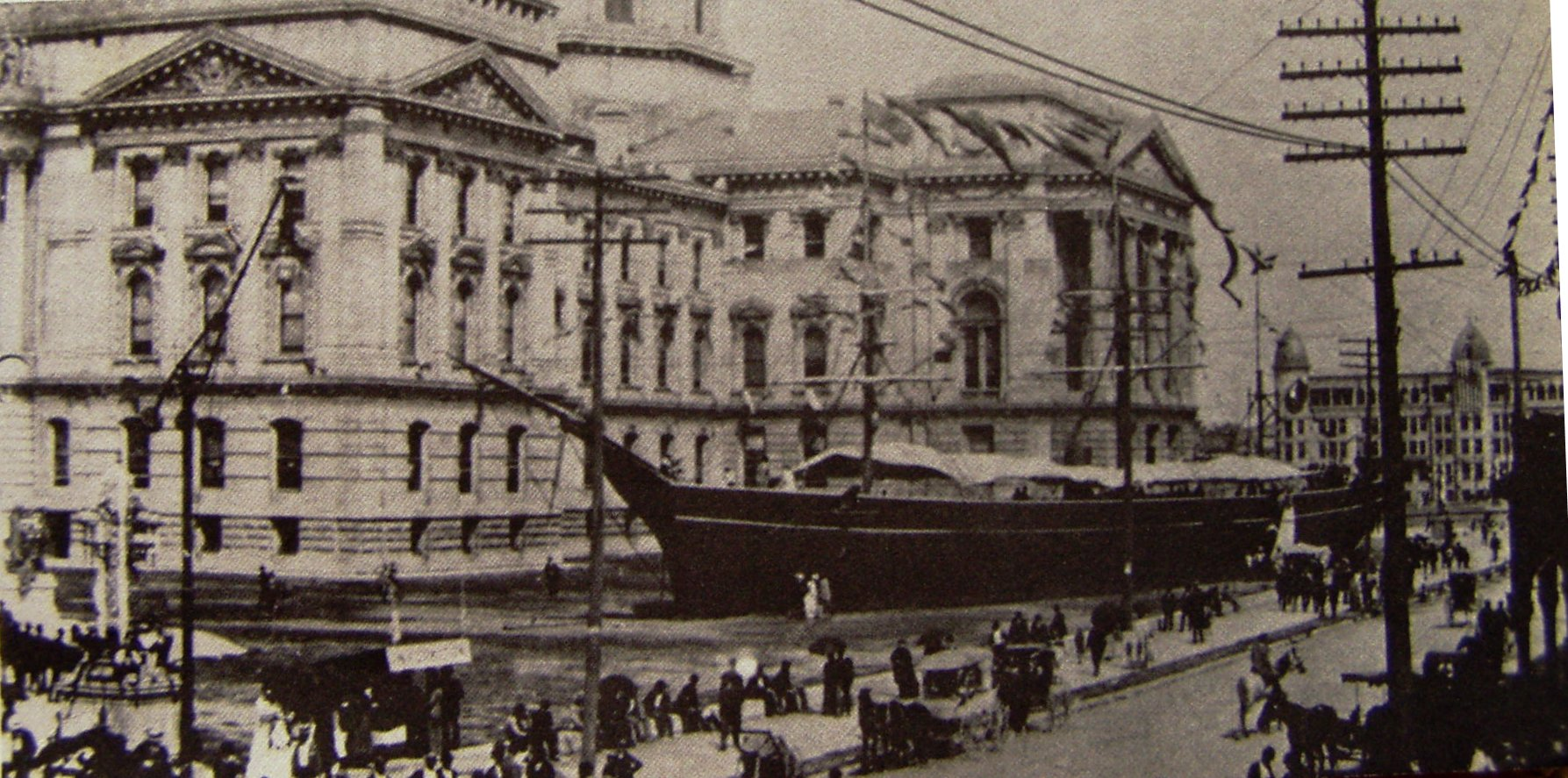
Replica of USS Kearsarge on display at the 1893 Grand Army of the Republic national convention in Indianapolis, Indiana

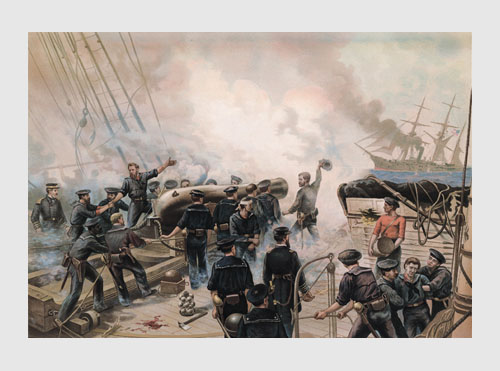
USS Kearsarge in Battle (1936), by Jo Davidson, Franklin D. Roosevelt Presidential Library

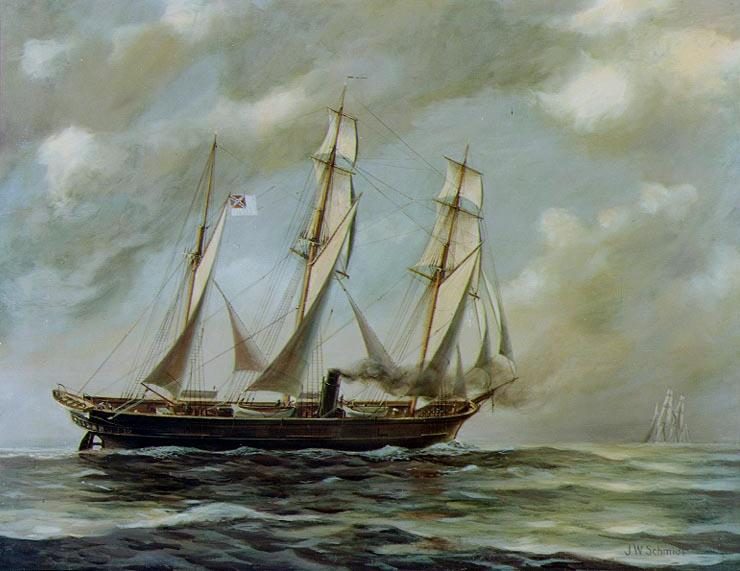
CSS Alabama (1961), by J.W. Schmidt, Naval History and Heritage Command

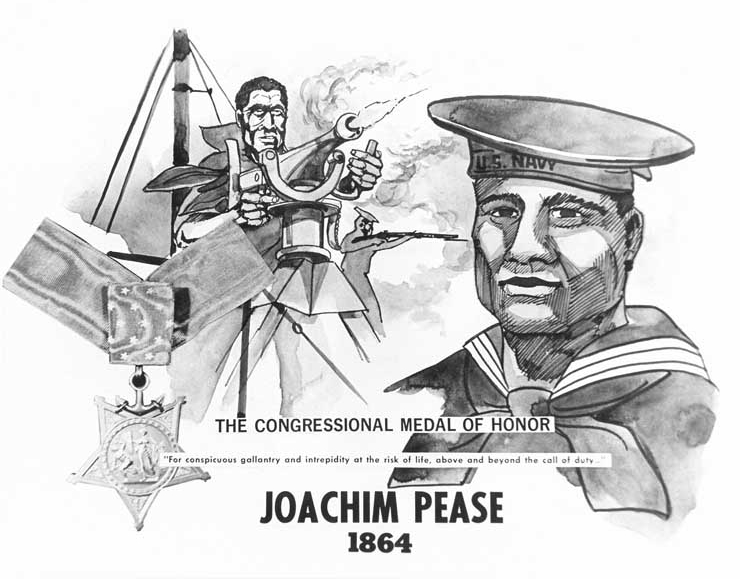
U.S. Navy recruiting poster highlighting Joachim Pease, 1970s
