= The Kearsarge at Boulogne =

1864 painting by Édouard Manet

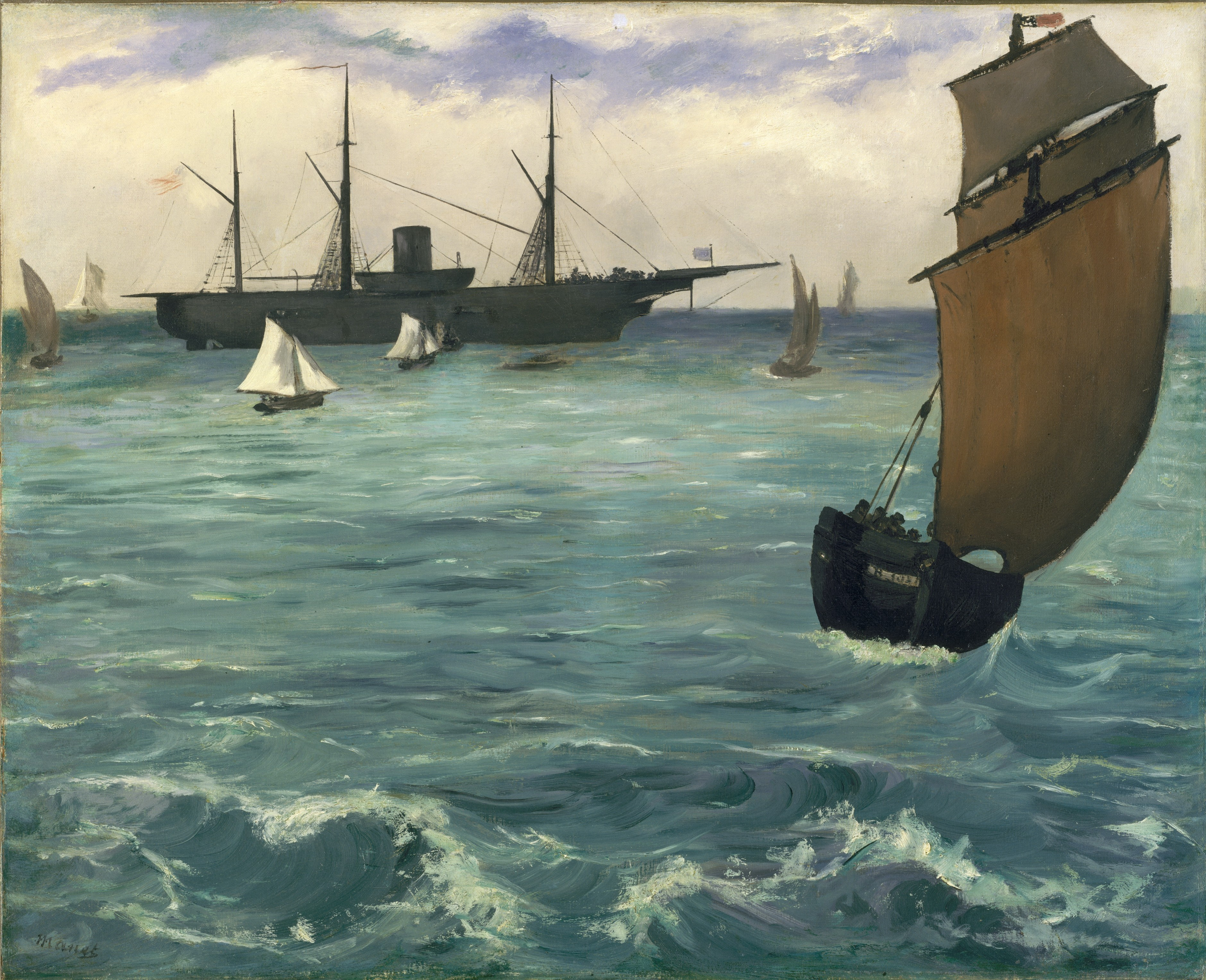
- Artist: Édouard Manet
- Year: 1864
- Medium: Oil on canvas
- Dimensions: 81.6 cm × 99.4 cm (32.1 in × 39.1 in)
- Location: Metropolitan Museum of Art, New York

The Kearsarge at Boulogne (French: Le «Kearsarge» à Boulogne) is a painting by the French artist Édouard Manet from 1864. It depicts the American man-of-war USS Kearsarge anchored near Boulogne-sur-Mer weeks after the ship’s victory over the CSS Alabama.

The painting was also called The Steamboat (French: Le Steamboat), Fishing Boat Coming in Before the Wind (French: Bateau de pêche arrivant vent arrière), and, incorrectly, The “Alabama” off Cherbourg (French: l’«Alabama» au large de Cherbourg). In an 1865 letter, Manet also called it La mer: le navire fédéral Kerseage en rade de Boulogne-sur-mer (English: The Sea: the Federal Ship Kearsarge off Boulogne-sur-Mer).

== Background ==
On June 19, 1864, the Kearsarge sank the Confederate raider CSS Alabama at the Battle of Cherbourg in one of the most celebrated naval actions of the American Civil War. Many spectators were able to see the battle from the coast of France. Manet did not witness the battle, but he may have drawn on press descriptions and newspaper illustrations to make an imaginary scene of the battle. This is the work known as The Battle of the Kearsarge and the Alabama, now at the Philadelphia Museum of Art.

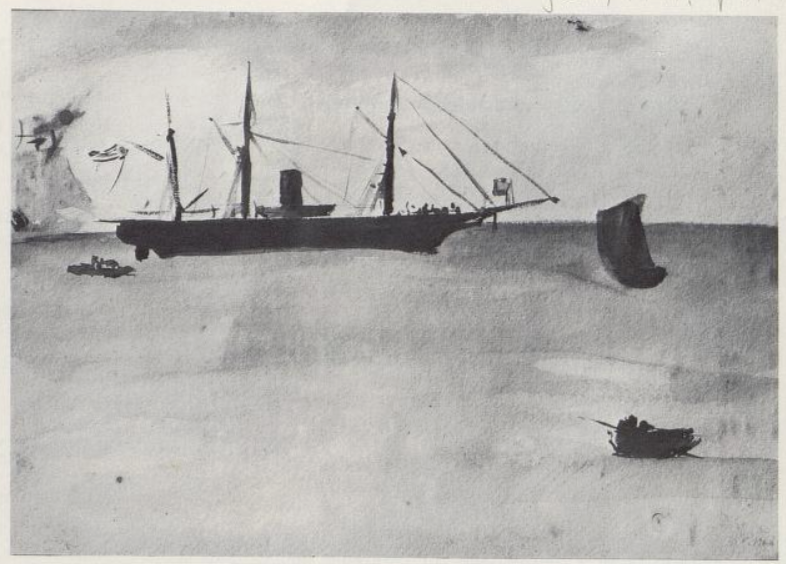
The watercolor sketch Manet did for The Kearsarge at Boulogne

In July 1864, the Kearsarge docked at Boulogne-sur-Mer several times, being the first American man-of-war to do so. Because of its novelty, it attracted large crowds who viewed the vessel from the dock, small boats, and on board the ship itself. Manet visited the Kearsarge and may even have boarded it sometime around July 10, 1864 to study the ship’s profile and its relation to the surrounding vessels. Manet made a watercolor of the Kearsarge, which has often been described as a preparatory study done from observation. However, divergences between sketch and photographs of the boat have raised some doubts about whether the watercolor was done from life.

== Composition and description ==
Manet organizes the painting into four horizontal registers: the immediate foreground sea, a second band with the fishing boat, a third more distant register containing the Kearsarge and other craft, and, lastly, the sky.

The lowest band is filled entirely with a green sea painted with broad, energetic brushstrokes in blues and grays mixed over deep green. Two arcs of white sea foam in this band represent currents pushing the water in opposite directions.

The second band contains a fishing vessel driving diagonally toward the viewer. Its brown sails act as a contrast to the turquoise water and balance the dark mass of the Kearsarge on the left. Manet initially referenced this boat by referring to the composition as Bateau de pêche arrivant vent arrière (English: “Fishing Boat Coming in Before the Wind”).

The third band shifts the color of the water from green to blue and contains the Kearsarge near the top edge. Manet sticks conventions of ship portraiture by presenting the ship in profile. The bows, bowsprit, masts, and rigging are also unaffected by the light’s effect on water. Four smaller sailing craft flank the warship on both sides, helping to establish depth and scale as well as counterbalance the fishing vessel.

In the highest band, the sky is filled with bright white clouds that turn grayer as they move towards the horizon.

== Analysis ==
Scholars describe The Kearsarge at Boulogne as typical of Manet style for sharp contrasts of light and shade. He uses rich, unmuted colors applied in broad swaths rather than half-tones. Compared to the more dramatic Battle of the Kearsarge and the Alabama, this piece is more tranquil while still reusing some of the earlier design.

Manet stated in a letter that he painted the Kearsarge “the way it looks at sea,” which some scholars have taken to mean he completed the painting using direct observation as opposed to his imagination for The Battle of the Kearsarge and the Alabama.

Although the Kearsarge is the painting's main subject, Manet pushes it into a higher band and fills the foreground with the fishing boat. This moves the viewer’s attention from the ship’s recent victory to everyday port life. Other scholars also compare the simplified, silhouetted rigging of the Kearsarge as typical of Japanese works, relating it to Manet’s interest in Japanese prints.

== Exhibition history and provenance ==
Exhibition History

- Martinet, Paris, 1865
- Avenue de l’Alma. "Manet," Paris, 1867, no. 34
- Wildenstein, "Manet," New York, 1948, no. 15
- Philadelphia Museum of Art. "Édouard Manet," 1966 - 1967 , no. 63
- The Art Institute of Chicago. "Édouard Manet," 1966 - 1967 , no. 63
- Wildenstein, "One Hundred Years of Impressionism," New York, 1970, no. 2
- Galeries nationales du Grand Palais. "Manet, 1832 - 1883," Paris, 1983, no. 84
- The Metropolitan Museum of Art. "Splendid Legacy: The Havemeyer Collection," New York, 1993, no. A347
- Galeries nationales du Grand Palais. "Impressionisme: Les Origines, 1859 - 1869," Paris, 1994, no. 100
- The Metropolitan Museum of Art. "Origins of Impressionism," New York, 1994 - 1995, no. 100
- Fondation Pierre Gianadda. "Manet," Martigny, 1996, no. 22
- The Metropolitan Museum of Art. "Manet and the American Civil War: The Battle of the U.S.S. 'Kearsarge' and C.S.S. 'Alabama'," New York, 2003, unnumbered
- Philadelphia Museum of Art. "Manet and the Sea," Philadelphia, 2004, no. 12
- Van Gogh Museum. "Manet and the Sea," Amsterdam, 2004, no. 12
- Musée d'Orsay. "Manet / Degas," Paris, 2023, unnumbered
- The Metropolitan Museum of Art. "Manet / Degas," New York, 2023 - 2024, unnumbered

Provenance

- Boussod and Valadon, Paris
- Goupy, Paris, 1890
- Goupy sale, Drouot, Paris, 30 March 1898, no. 20
- Durand-Ruel, Paris and New York
- Ms. H. O. Havemeyer, New York
- Mrs. P. H. B. Frelinghuysen (Adaline Havemeyer), Washington, D.C.
- Peter H. B. Frelinghuysen, Morristown, N.J.

== See also ==
- List of paintings by Édouard Manet
- 1864 in art
- The Battle of the Kearsarge and the Alabama
