= Edward A. Geary =

American politician (1892–1974)

- Oregon state legislator Edward Geary, 1950

47th Speaker of the Oregon House of Representatives
- In office 1955–1956
- Preceded by: Rudie Wilhelm, Jr.
- Succeeded by: Pat Dooley

Member of the Oregon House of Representatives from the 32nd district
- In office 1949–1956
- Preceded by: Rose M. Poole
- Succeeded by: John L. Kerbow

Personal details
- Born: June 16, 1892 Medford, Oregon, US
- Died: October 19, 1974 (aged 82) Clackamas, Oregon, US
- Party: Republican
- Education: Oregon State University
- Profession: Farmer

Edward Andrew Geary (June 16, 1892 – October 19, 1974) was an American politician and farmer from the state of Oregon. He was a Republican who served eight years in the Oregon House of Representatives. In the house, Geary represented a large rural district in southern Oregon. He served as Speaker of the Oregon House of Representatives during the 1955 legislative session. He also served as acting governor of Oregon for several brief periods in the mid-1950s.

== Early life ==
Geary was born in Medford, Oregon, on June 16, 1892, the son of Edward P. and Agnes (McCornack) Geary. His father was a very successful physician. Shortly after Geary was born, his family moved to Portland, Oregon, where he attended Portland Academy. After high school, he attended the University of Oregon briefly before transferring to the University of Wisconsin. He later returned to Oregon and graduated from Oregon State University with a B.S. in agriculture in 1915.

During World War I, Geary was a second lieutenant in the United States Army Signal Corps. He was trained as a balloon observation officer at the Fort Omaha Balloon School in Nebraska. He served in an Army balloon company from 1917 to 1919.

After the war, Geary began farming in the Medford area, where he had a commercial orchard. He later moved to Klamath Falls and began farming there. He founded the Geary Brothers Ranch near Upper Klamath Lake and managed the operation for many years, raising Hereford cattle and producing bentgrass seed. The Geary Ranch eventually became one of the largest commercial grass seed producers in the world. Geary married Marian Howe in 1931. Together they had one daughter.

Over the years, Geary was very active in civic affairs as well as a number of local, state, and national agriculture organizations. He was a member of the local Elks lodge, the American Farm Bureau Federation, and the local Grange. He was a member of the Oregon Seed Growers association for many years and served the group's president in 1948. He was also a long-time member of Oregon's State Board of Agriculture and was the board chairman in 1948.

== State representative ==
In 1948, Geary ran for a District 32 seat in the Oregon House of Representatives as a Republican. Geary won one of the two Republican primary nominations along with Carl Steinseifer. The Democratic Party nominated Thomas E. Bustin and incumbent Henry Semon. In the November general election, Geary won one of the two District 32 seats. District 32 was a large rural district in southern Oregon covering all of Klamath County, over 6,100 square miles (16,000 km^{2}). He took his seat in the Oregon House on January 10, 1949, and served through the 1949 regular legislative session which ended in mid-April. During the session, Geary served as a member of the highway, education, and the engrossed and enrolled bills committees. After the regular legislature session adjourned, Geary was appointed to the interim highway committee which was charged with reviewing the state's highway tax structure and recommending tax rate adjustments to the 1951 legislature.

In 1950, Geary decided to run for re-election in District 32. Geary and Fred Peterson won the Republican nominations in the primary while Henry Semon, the other District 32 incumbent, and Jesse Z. Smith won Democratic nominations. In November, Geary and Semon once again won the two District 32 seats. This allowed Geary to serve in the 1951 regular legislative session which opened on January 8 and lasted into early May. During the session, he was appointed chairman of highways committee and also served as a members of the taxation committee. As chairman of the highways committee, he introduced bills to significantly increase highway taxes on trucks and issue state bonds for highway construction and maintenance.

Geary filed for re-election again in 1952. The two District 32 incumbents, Geary and Semon, were the only candidates filing so both were re-elected without opposition. The 1953 legislative session began on January 12 and lasted through April 21. During the session, Geary was re-appointed as chairman of the House highways committee.

== Speaker of the Oregon House ==
In January 1954, Geary announced he would seek re-election. He also announced that if he was re-elected, he would be a candidate for speaker of the Oregon House of Representatives in the up-coming session. There were two other incumbent state representatives interested in the speaker position, Dave Baum of La Grande and Carl Francis of Dayton.

In 1954, the number for the Klamath County House district was changed from District 32 to District 30, but the area represented did not change. Geary was the only Republican to file in District 30 so he won the primary unopposed. Henry Semon, the other district incumbent, was nominated in Democratic primary along with Dorothy Lowell.

After the primary, Geary began traveling around the state speaking with Republican candidates running for House seats. Shortly after the primary election, Dave Baun announced he already had 24 of the 31 votes needed to be elected speaker. Nevertheless, Geary continued to meet with Republican candidates. By September, Baun had over 40 pledged votes, assuring his election as speaker. However, Baun lost his seat in the general election to a Democratic challenger, leaving Geary as the only Republican candidate for speaker.

The legislative session began on January 10. While the Republicans had a 35 to 25 majority in House, Geary was elected to the speaker position unanimously by his House peers. At the beginning of the session, the House decided to allow radio and television reporters inside the chambers for first time. However, live broadcasting was not authorized except with prior approval of the speaker. As speaker, Geary framed a number of important issues for House action. These issues included expanding unemployment insurance to cover all Oregon workers, raising the minimum wage for teachers across the state, and increasing the pay of Oregon Supreme Court judges. The legislature also passed a bill urging the United States Congress to admit Alaska as a state. The session ended on 4 May. It was the second longest legislative session in Oregon history, lasting a total of 115 days. While Geary was not a dynamic public politician, he proved to be an excellent behind-the-scene leader throughout the session. As a result, some newspapers began suggesting that he had potential for higher state office.

As speaker of the Oregon House, Geary had the opportunity to serve as acting governor on several occasions. At that time, the Oregon State Senate president served as acting governor whenever the elected governor was out of the state. As speaker of the house, Geary was next in line, serving as acting governor when both Governor Paul L. Patterson and senate president Elmo E. Smith were out of the state at the same time. The first time he served as acting governor was in September 1955. After Elmo Smith became governor, Geary had a second opportunity to serve as acting governor in August 1956. He served as governor once again in January 1957. This occurred only a few days before Geary's term as speaker ended.

== Later life ==
In 1956, Geary announced he would run for the Oregon State Senate in District 18. That senate district represented Klamath County, the same constituency that Geary represented in the Oregon House of Representatives. Harry D. Boivin, the incumbent senator, filed for the District 18 seat as a Democrat. In the November general election, Boivin retained his senate seat, defeating Geary by a vote of 9,642 to 7,509.

After losing the senate race, Geary remained active in public affairs. In 1957, he was appointed to the Oregon Republican Party's policy and action committee. At that time, other members of the committee included Mark Hatfield, Charles A. Sprague, and Wendell Wyatt. In 1960, he was elected president of Oregon Tax Research, a private organization that studied tax policy and advocated for tax reform. He continued represented the Oregon Tax Research group for a number of years.

After his wife's death in 1966, Geary sold his ranch and moved to the Portland area. He died on October 19, 1974, in Clackamas, Oregon. Geary was buried in the Masonic cemetery in Eugene, Oregon.
