= David Poole =

David Poole may refer to:

- David Poole (dancer) (1925–1991), South African ballet dancer
- David Poole (footballer) (born 1984), English footballer
- David Poole (judge) (1938–2006), English High Court judge
- David C. Poole (born 1959), British-American physiologist

== See also ==
- David Pool (born 1966), American gridiron football player
- David Pole (disambiguation)
