= Richard Poole =

Richard Poole may refer to:

- Richard Poole (physician) (1783–1871), Scottish phrenologist
- Richard Poole (footballer) (born 1957), English footballer
- Richard Poole (character), fictional detective from the Death in Paradise television series portrayed by Ben Miller

== See also ==
- Dick Poole (disambiguation)
