= Robert Pooley =

Robert Pooley or Poley may refer to:

- Robert Henry Pooley (1878–1954), Canadian lawyer and politician
- Robert Poley or Pooley (fl. 1568–1602), English spy
- Robert Pooley (businessman), of Pooley Sword
- Robert Poley (English MP) (c. 1600–1627), MP for Queenborough in 1624 and 1626
- Robert Pooley (Irish MP), MP for Castlemartyr in 1692

== See also ==
- Robert Poole (disambiguation)
