= Robert Poole =

Robert Poole may refer to:

- Robert Poole (historian) (born 1957), professor of history at the University of Central Lancashire
- Robert Poole (industrialist) (1818–1903), foundry and machine works owner in Baltimore
- Robert Poole (politician) (born 1948), Australian politician
- Robert Poole (rugby), English rugby league and rugby union player
- Robert W. Poole, Jr., founder of the Reason Foundation

== See also ==
- Robert Roy Pool (born 1953), American screenwriter
- Robert Pooley (disambiguation)
