= Dick Poole =

Dick Poole may refer to:

- Dick Poole (cyclist), English cyclist
- Dick Poole (footballer) (1872–1939), Australian rules football player for Collingwood
- Dick Poole (rugby league) (1930–2025), Australian rugby league footballer and coach
- Dick Poole Fillies' Stakes, a horse race run at Salisbury Racecourse

== See also ==
- Richard Poole (disambiguation)
