= Henry Poole =

Henry Poole may refer to:

- Henry Poole (died 1559), MP for Leicestershire
- Henry Poole (died 1580), MP for Wootton Bassett in 1553
- Henry Poole (died 1616) (1541–1616), of Sapperton, English MP for Gloucestershire
- Henry Poole (died 1632) (1564–1632), of Kemble, English MP for Wiltshire
- Henry Poole (died 1645) (c. 1592–1645), English MP for Cirencester
- Henry Poole (sculptor) (1873–1928), sculptor and member of the Royal Academy
- Henry Poole (technologist), American internet specialist
- Henry Ward Poole (1825–1890), American engineer and writer
- Henry Poole & Co, English tailoring firm

== See also ==
- Henry Poole Is Here, 2008 film
- Harry Poole (born 1935), English footballer
- Harry Poole (rugby league), rugby league footballer of the 1960s for Great Britain, and Hull Kingston Rovers
