= Rose M. Poole =

American politician

- State Representative Rose Poole, ca. 1940

Member of the Oregon House of Representatives from the 32nd district
- In office 1945–1948
- Preceded by: Louis H. Craver
- Succeeded by: Edward A. Geary

Personal details
- Born: 27 May 1880 Saginaw, Michigan, US
- Died: 10 July 1963 (aged 83) Denver, Colorado, US
- Party: Republican
- Spouse(s): Neil B. Torrey; Harry W. Poole
- Profession: Theatre owner

Rose Morey Poole (27 May 1880 – 10 July 1963; born Rose Morey; then Rose Torrey prior to her second marriage) was an American businesswoman and politician from Klamath Falls, Oregon. She was a Republican who served two terms in the Oregon House of Representatives, representing a large rural district in southern Oregon. She was also a successful businesswoman who owned a number of movie theatres in and around Klamath Falls.

== Early life ==
Poole was born on 27 May 1880 in Saginaw, Michigan. She was the daughter of Reverend Samuel Livingston Morey and Eleanor (Rodgers) Morey. Her father was born in England and mother came from Ireland. Both immigrated to the United States and settled in Michigan. She was the youngest of nine children and attended school in Saginaw.

Poole married Neil B. Torrey in 1900. Together, they had two children. Their son, Roger, was born in Grand Rapids, Michigan in 1901, and their daughter, Ellenor, was born a years later in Petoskey, Michigan. Poole and Torrey were later divorced. In 1910, Poole moved from Michigan to southern Oregon.

Shortly after arriving in southern Oregon, Poole filed a homestead land claim on property west of Upper Klamath Lake, near the unincorporated community of Rocky Point in Klamath County, Oregon. In 1911, Poole moved to Klamath Falls where she became the office manager for the Klamath Development Company. She continued in that position for nine years. She began her community service during this period as well, serving as a precinct chairman for a county-wide Liberty Bond drive in 1919. Later that year, she married Harry W. Poole, a school friend from Michigan.

== Businesswoman ==
While still working for the Klamath Development Company, Poole helped her husband get started in the theatre business in Klamath Falls. Together, the Pooles bought the Liberty Theatre in 1919. They bought the Pine Tree Theater in 1923, and then built the Pelican Theater in 1929. In 1931, the Pooles acquired the Rainbow and Vox theatres. For a time, they also owned two other Klamath Falls theatres, the Orpheus and the Rex, as well as a theatre in the nearby town of Chiloquin.

When her husband died in 1939, Poole took charge of the theatre business, assuming the roles of president and general manager. In 1940, Poole’s business operation included five Klamath Falls theatres. She was an active manager who used her business to support a wide range of community activities. It was her policy to give free movie tickets to anyone in a wheelchair. She also gave free passes to local safety award winners and to young people who helped decorate parade floats. During World War II, Poole provided free theatre tickets to local air raid wardens. As a result of her civic engagement, Poole was a well-respected member of the Klamath Falls community.

Poole was also active in a wide range of local organizations including the League of Women Voters, Business and Professional Women, and the Klamath Falls Library Club. She was also a founding member of the local Soroptimists club, which was organized in 1939. She served as president of that organization in 1943. In 1941, Poole lead the first of several county-wide war bond drives. She was also publicity chairman for the local Red Cross organization during the early years of World War II.

== State legislator ==
In 1944, Poole decided to run as a Republican for a District 32 seat in the Oregon House of Representatives. At that time, District 32 was a large rural district that represented all of Klamath County with two House seats. Because the district had two seats, each party nominated two candidates in its primary. In 1944, only two Republicans and two Democrats filed for the District 32 seats. As a result, all four candidates were advanced to the general election. Poole and Dale West were nominated by the Republican party while incumbent Henry Semon and fellow Democrat, Thomas Bustin, were nominated in the Democratic primary.

As the general election approached, Poole's campaign focused on her support for limited government, economic development, public school improvements, and natural resource conservation. In the general election, Poole got the second-most votes in the field of four candidates, winning one of the two District 32 seats. The other seat went to incumbent Democratic, Henry Semon. Semon won the most votes with 6,942; Poole was second with 4,891; followed by Dale West with 4,709 and Thomas Bustin with 3,682 votes.

When she was elected, Poole became the first Republican to represent Klamath County in the legislature in a decade. She served in the regular session that began on 8 January 1945 and lasted through 17 March. Poole served as vice chairperson of the House forestry committee. She was also a member of the highways and highway revenue, game, bills and mailing, and livestock committees. During the session, she joined two other representatives to sponsor Oregon House Joint Memorial Number 9, an unsuccessful attempt to prevent Japanese Americans and future Japanese immigrants from settling in Oregon after the on-going world war ended. Shortly after the legislative session ended, her son-in-law was killed in combat while serving with the United States Army in Germany.

Poole filed for re-election in 1946, seeking to retain her District 32 seat. Poole and Troy Cooke were the only Republicans who filed for the two District 32 seats. As a result, both were nominated to run in the general election against Henry Semon, who was unopposed in the Democratic primary. In the general election, Semon received 5,054 votes; Poole ran second, receiving 4,443 votes with Cooke trailing with 3,637 votes. As a result, Poole and Semon held on to their House seats.

When the regular legislative session began on 13 January 1947, Poole was part of a Republican majority in the House of Representatives that outnumbered Democrats 58 to 2. She was appointed vice chairperson of the billing and mailing committee. She also served on the election and reapportionment, game, and local government committees. The Speaker of the House later appointed her to the natural resources committee as well. That committee was responsible for handling all forestry, mining, and fisheries legislation. During the session, Poole worked with Semon to secure state funding to convert the United States Marine Corps barracks in Klamath Falls into a technical training school (the new school became Oregon Institute of Technology). After the 1947 legislative session ended on 5 April, Poole returned to Klamath Falls.

== Later life ==
Back in Klamath Falls, Poole continued to operate her movie theatre business. She decided not to run for re-election in 1948. However, she remained active in local politics, supporting Republican candidates in Klamath County. In addition, she served on the Klamath Falls planning committee.

In 1948, Poole sold the Pelican Theatre and then retired. In 1950, she moved to Harbor, a small community on the southern Oregon coast. In 1959, she moved to Lakewood, Colorado to live with her daughter. Poole died in a Denver, Colorado hospital on 10 July 1963, as a result of complications from a broken hip. Her funeral was held at St Paul's Episcopal Church in Klamath Falls. She was then buried at Klamath Memorial Park in Klamath Falls.
