= David C. Poole =

Welsh-American physiologist

David Poole
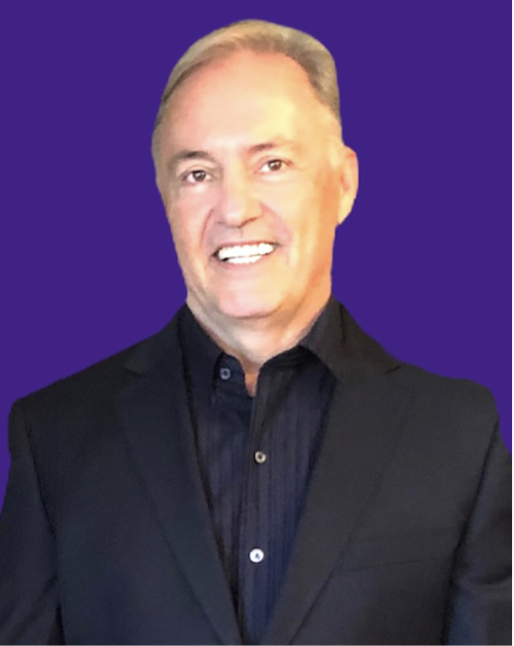
- David C. Poole in 2022
- Born: David Christopher Poole; 1959 (age 65–66); Nairobi, Kenya
- Education: Liverpool Polytechnic, B.Sc. and University of California, Los Angeles (UCLA), Ph.D.
- Awards: Scientiae Doctor from Liverpool John Moores University (2000); Adolph Distinguished Lecturer from the American Physiological Society (2018); Joseph B. Wolffe Memorial Lecture from the American College of Sports Medicine (2021); Higuchi-Dolph Simons Statewide Award for Biomedical Research Excellence (Kansas' highest award for scientific achievement) University of Kansas (2024)
- Scientific career
- Fields: Kinesiology; Physiology
- Institutions: UCSD; Kansas State University

David Christopher Poole (born 1959) is a British-American scientist who researches oxygen transport in health and disease focusing on the mechanisms of exercise intolerance.

== Academic work ==
He is a University Distinguished Professor and Coffman Chair for Distinguished Undergraduate Teaching Scholars in the Departments of Kinesiology and Anatomy & Physiology at Kansas State University. His laboratory has been funded by the National Institutes of Health and the American Heart Association.

== Research ==
His models of capillary function, O_{2} uptake kinetics and Critical Power have become de rigueur in exercise physiology.

== Affiliations with organisations ==
He was elected President of the American College of Sports Medicine (ACSM) Central State Chapter in 2001 and Chair for the Environmental and Exercise Physiology section of the American Physiological Society (APS) in 2021. He presented the APS's Adolph Distinguished Lecture in 2018 entitled: "Muscle Microcirculation: Gateway to Function and Dysfunction".

A Fellow of the American College of Sports Medicine (ACSM), he delivered the Joseph B. Wolffe Memorial Lecture entitled "How Do YOU Power Aerobic Exercise" at the ACSM's 2021 annual meeting and received the ACSM Citation Award in 2019.

== Selected publications ==
Poole's full list of research works can be found here: https://scholar.google.com/citations?hl=en&user=FCL4MmkAAAAJ&view_op=list_works&sortby=pubdate

Poole, D.C.; et al. (1988). "Metabolic and respiratory profile of the upper limit for prolonged exercise in man". Ergonomics. 31 (9): 1265–1279. doi:10.1080/00140138808966766. PMID 3191904.

Gaesser, G.A.; et al. (1996). "The slow component of oxygen uptake in humans". Exercise and Sport Sciences Reviews. 24 (1): 35–70. doi:10.1249/00003677-199600240-00004. PMID 8744246.

Poole, D.C.; et al. (1985). "Response of ventilatory and lactate thresholds to continuous and interval training". Journal of Applied Physiology. 58 (4): 1115–1121. doi:10.1152/jappl.1985.58.4.1115. PMID 3988668.

Kindig, C.A.; et al. (2001). "Efficacy of nasal strip and furosemide in mitigating EIPH in Thoroughbred horses". Journal of Applied Physiology. 91 (3): 1396–1400. doi:10.1152/jappl.2001.91.3.1396. PMID 11509541. https://www.espn.com/horse-racing/story/_/id/10973676/science-california-chrome-nasal-strip-espn-magazine

Poole, D.C.; et al. (2012). "Muscle oxygen transport and utilization in heart failure: implications for exercise (in)tolerance". American Journal of Physiology. Heart and Circulatory Physiology. 302 (5): H1050 – H1063. doi:10.1152/ajpheart.00943.2011. PMC 3311454. PMID 22101528.

Poole, D.C. (2021). "The anaerobic threshold: 50+ years of controversy". The Journal of Physiology. 599 (3): 737–767. doi:10.1113/JP279963. PMID 33112439.

Behnke, B.J.; et al. (2003). "Oxygen exchange profile in rat muscles of contrasting fibre types". The Journal of Physiology. 549 (2): 597–605. doi:10.1113/jphysiol.2002.035915. PMC 2342949. PMID 12692174.

Schulze, K.M. (2025). "KATP channel inhibition-induced hyporemia in skeletal muscle: No evidence for pre-capillary sphincter action". Microvascular Research. 160 (6) e104808. doi:10.1016/j.mvr.2025.104808. PMID 40164381.

Horn, A.G. (2025). "Ageing impairs endothelium-dependent vasodilatation and alters redox signalling in diaphragm arterioles from male and female Fischer-344 rats". The Journal of Physiology. 603 (6): 1439–1459. doi:10.1113/JP287451. PMID 40023797.
