= Frazer Poole =

American librarian and preservation specialist

Frazer G. Poole
- Poole in 1963
- Born: Federalsburg, Maryland; November 5, 1915
- Died: February 3, 1999 (aged 83); Alexandria, Virginia

Frazer Glendon Poole (1915–1999) was an American librarian and preservation specialist known for creating Preservation Microfilming Office (PMO) at the Library of Congress.

== Early life and education ==
Poole was born in Federalsburg, Maryland to Earl and Norma Poole. He received a BA from Catawba College in 1937. He served in the U.S. Navy at Okinawa in WWII and later served again in the Korean War. In 1949, he received his library degree from the University of California, Berkeley.

== Career ==
In 1956 he became assistant librarian at the University of California, Santa Barbara.

Poole moved to Chicago to direct the American Library Association's Library Technology Project in 1959. The program "tested library equipment and supplies, promoted standards, and disseminated objective technical information" about library products. He joined the University of Illinois Chicago in 1963 as librarian and library administration professor. During this time he spent five weeks in Brazil as a consultant on the new library at the University of Brazil.

He published The library environment: aspects of interior planning in 1965. He edited the book The Procurement of Library Furnishings with Alphonse Trezza which was published in 1969.

In 1968 the Library of Congress centralized their preservation activities, creating the assistant director for Preservation position. Poole was hired and created the Preservation Microfilming Office which rapidly filmed materials, completing ninety-three million pages between 1968 and 1984. During this time he also served as coordinator of the Library's Building Planning Office for the James Madison Memorial Building, representing the library's requirements to the Architect of the Capitol and was heavily involved in its interior design. He was awarded a Distinguished Service Award in recognition of his work with the Library's preservation program.

He held the post until his retirement in 1978. After his retirement he worked as chief of library materials and preservation for UNESCO, undertaking assignments in the Middle East and Latin America.

Poole died February 3, 1999, of renal failure in Alexandria, Virginia.
