= Terry Poole =

Terry Poole may refer to:

- Terry Poole (American football), American football offensive tackle
- Terry Poole (footballer, born 1937), English footballer
- Terry Poole (footballer, born 1949), English footballer
