= The Battle of the Kearsarge and the Alabama =

Painting by Édouard Manet

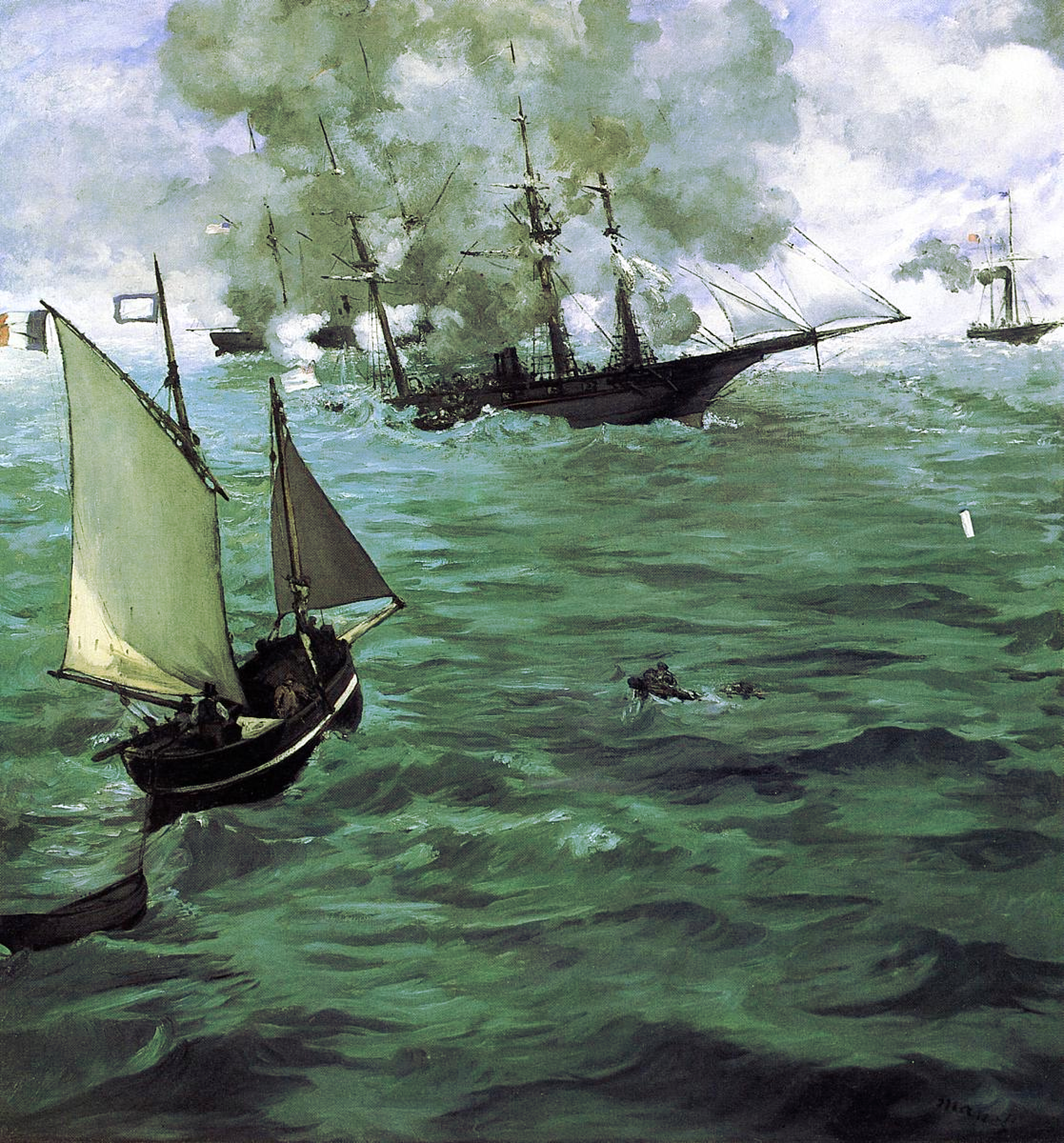
- Artist: Édouard Manet
- Year: 1864
- Medium: Oil on canvas
- Dimensions: 134 cm × 127 cm (53 in × 50 in)
- Location: Philadelphia Museum of Art, Philadelphia

The Battle of the Kearsarge and the Alabama is an 1864 oil painting by Édouard Manet. The painting commemorates the Battle of Cherbourg of June 19, 1864, a naval engagement of the American Civil War between the Union cruiser USS Kearsarge and the Confederate raider CSS Alabama. Many spectators were able to see the battle from the coast of France and saw the USS Kearsarge sink the CSS Alabama. Not having witnessed the battle himself, Manet relied on press descriptions of the battle to document his work. Within one month of this battle, Manet had already completed this painting and got it on display in the print shop of Alfred Cadart in Paris.

In 1872, Barbey d'Aurevilly stated that the painting was a "magnificent marine painting" and that "the sea ... is more frightening than the battle". It was hung at Alfred Cadart's and was praised by the critic Philippe Burty.

The painting was acquired by the French art collector Marguerite Charpentier in 1878 and is now in the permanent collection of the Philadelphia Museum of Art.

== Advance notice ==
The battle between Kearsarge and Alabama received considerable attention in the French press. Although Manet himself was not present at the battle, he began to paint the event based on newspaper descriptions shortly afterwards. Just 26 days later, he was able to exhibit the work in Alfred Cadart's art gallery on Rue de Richelieu in Paris. At the top of the painting is Alabama, which is about to sink; beyond, barely visible, the Kearsarge. In the thick clouds of smoke, the loosely painted masts and ropes are partially visible. On the right is probably the civilian British yacht Deerhound, whose crew rescued members of Alabama's crew and saved them from being captured. In the foreground, a French ship rushes to the aid of sailors who have clung to a piece of wreckage.

Although they are not among his best-known works, Manet painted a large number of sea and harbor views. Until a few years before his death, they were the only landscapes he made. The journey he undertook as a 16-year-old boy to Brazil and many holidays on the coast of the Channel probably play a role in this. Striking in all these seascapes is the high horizon, perhaps inspired by Japanese prints. The foaming sea, painted turquoise, blue, and grey, takes up three quarters of the painting.

== See also ==
- List of paintings by Édouard Manet
- The Kearsarge at Boulogne
- 1864 in art
