= James Poole =

James or Jim Poole may refer to:

- Sir James Poole, 1st Baronet (c. 1640–c. 1710), of the Poole baronets
- James Poole (painter), (1804–1886), English painter
- Jim Poole (first baseman) (1895–1975), American baseball player
- Buster Poole (James Eugene Poole, 1915–1994), American football player
- James Richard Poole (1932–2021), American badminton player
- Jim Poole (pitcher) (1966–2023), American baseball player
- James Poole (footballer) (born 1990), English footballer
