= Thomas Poole =

Thomas or Tom Poole may refer to:

- Thomas Poole (academic), law professor at LSE
- Thomas Poole (MP), member of Parliament for Cirencester, 1571 and 1572
- Thomas Poole (tanner) (1766–1837), English tanner, Radical philanthropist, and essayist
- Thomas Bell Poole (1818–1865), American criminal
- Thomas Henry Poole (1860–1919), British-born architect who designed buildings in New York City
- Thomas Slaney Poole (1873–1927), South Australian lawyer
- Tom Poole (barrister) (1935–2017), first blind person in Britain to train and practice as a barrister
- Tom Poole (colorist), colorist at Company 3
- Tom Poole (footballer), English 19th-century footballer

== See also ==
- Tommy Pool (1935–1990), American sport shooter
