= Will Poole =

American football player (born 1981)

No. 23, 27
- Position: Cornerback

Personal information
- Born: July 24, 1981 (age 45); Beckley, West Virginia, U.S.
- Listed height: 5 ft 10 in (1.78 m)
- Listed weight: 193 lb (88 kg)

Career information
- High school: Queens (NY) Christ the King
- College: USC
- NFL draft: 2004: 4th round, 102nd overall pick

Career history
- Miami Dolphins (2004–2006); Kansas City Chiefs (2007)*; Toronto Argonauts (2007)*; Kansas City Chiefs (2008)*; Toronto Argonauts (2008–2009); Hamilton Tiger-Cats (2010)*; Sacramento Mountain Lions (2011); San Antonio Talons (2012)
- * Offseason or practice squad member only

Awards and highlights
- Second-team All-American (2003); First-team All-Pac-10 (2003)

Career NFL statistics
- Total tackles: 31
- Sacks: 1
- Pass deflections: 5
- Stats at Pro Football Reference
- Stats at CFL.ca (archive)

William Starling Poole (born July 24, 1981) is an American former professional football player who was a cornerback in the National Football League (NFL) and Canadian Football League (CFL). He played college football for the USC Trojans and was selected by the Miami Dolphins in the fourth round of the 2004 NFL draft.

Poole was also a member of the Kansas City Chiefs, Toronto Argonauts, Hamilton Tiger-Cats, Sacramento Mountain Lions and San Antonio Talons.

== Early life ==
Poole was a top high school player at Christ The King Regional High School in New York City and a Parade All-American his junior year. He also competed on their nationally ranked basketball team.

== College career ==
He is a University of Southern California graduate whose senior team split the collegiate national championship with Louisiana State University. He first went to Boston College. Following that he went to Ventura College. Best known for his standout performance against Michigan which included two sacks in the 2004 Rose Bowl (played on January 1) en route to a USC 28–14 victory.

=== Awards and honors ===
- Junior College Athletic Bureau All-American (2002)
- SuperPrep JUCO 100 (2002)
- Western State Conference Mountain Division Defensive MVP (2002)
- Ventura College Team MVP (2002)
- Pac-10 Defensive Player of the Week (November 5, 2003)
- First-team All-Pac-10 selection by CollegeFootballNews.com, ESPN.com and Rivals.com (2003)
- Second-team All-American by the AP and CollegeFootballNews.com
- Honorable mention Rivals.com All-American (2003)
- USC Co-Special Teams Player of the Year (2003)

== Professional career ==
=== Miami Dolphins ===
He was selected in the fourth round by the Miami Dolphins in 2004. Plagued with knee injuries throughout his career, he played during a promising rookie season and was placed on IR during the 2005 and 2006 seasons then was waived by Miami on December 19, 2006. He tried out for the New Orleans Saints on the weekend of May 12–13, 2007.

=== Kansas City Chiefs (first stint) ===
Poole signed a two-year deal with the Kansas City Chiefs on July 27, 2007. However, he was released by the team on September 1 during final cuts.

=== Toronto Argonauts (first stint) ===
On October 4, 2007, Poole was signed by the Toronto Argonauts of the Canadian Football League and assigned to their practice roster. He was later released by the team on October 10, 2007.

=== Kansas City Chiefs (second stint) ===
On May 27, 2008, Poole was re-signed by the Chiefs. He was released on August 10.

=== Toronto Argonauts (second stint) ===
Less than a year after being signed to the Argonauts' practice squad, Poole re-joined the Argonauts on September 8, 2008.

=== Sacramento Mountain Lions ===
On May 25, 2011, Poole signed with the Sacramento Mountain Lions of the United Football League.

== Personal life ==
Poole has a daughter, Kayla Poole.
