= James Lee =

James Lee may refer to:

Ordered chronologically within each section.

== Arts and entertainment ==
- James Lee (screenwriter) (1923–2002), American screenwriter
- James Lee (writer) (born 1947), Singaporean writer
- James Lee (film director) (born 1973), Malaysian film director and producer
- James Kyson Lee (born 1975), Korean-born American actor
- James Lee (tenor) (born 1979), South Korean opera tenor
- James Lee, vocalist for the death metal band Origin

== Business ==
- James Lee (nurseryman) (1715–1795), Scottish nurseryman, trading as Lee and Kennedy
- James T. Lee (1877–1968), American lawyer, banker and real estate developer
- James B. Lee, Jr. (1952–2015), investment banker
- James Zhongzi Lee (born 1955), Chinese business magnate, investor and real estate developer

== Sports ==
- James Lee (cricketer, born 1838) (1838–1880), Yorkshire cricketer during the 1860s
- James P. Lee (1870–1941), American football player
- Tancy Lee (1882–1941), Scottish boxer born James Lee
- James Lee (basketball) (born 1956), American basketball player
- James Lee (defensive tackle) (1980–2016), American football player
- James Lee (offensive lineman) (born 1985), American football player
- James Lee (cricketer, born 1988), Yorkshire cricketer during the 2000s

== Other fields ==
- James Prince Lee (1804–1869), English clergyman who became the first Bishop of Manchester
- James Paris Lee (1831–1904), British-Canadian inventor and arms designer
- James H. Lee (1840–1877), American sailor and Medal of Honor recipient
- James Fenner Lee (1843–1898), American politician from Maryland
- James Yimm Lee (1920–1972), martial arts author
- James Madison Lee (1926–2017), U.S. Army general
- James Lee (Canadian politician) (1937–2023), Prince Edward Island politician
- James Edgar Lee (1900–?), state legislator in Mississippi
- James Jay Lee, perpetrator in the 2010 Discovery Communications headquarters hostage crisis

== See also ==
- James Lee House (disambiguation)
- Jim Lee (disambiguation)
- Jimmy Lee (disambiguation)
- James Leigh (disambiguation)
