= Thomas Dudley (disambiguation) =

Thomas Dudley was a magistrate, governor, and one of the founders of the Massachusetts Bay Colony.

Thomas Dudley may also refer to:

- Thomas Dudley (MP) (died 1593), English politician
- Thomas Dudley (engraver), English engraver
- Thomas Haines Dudley, Union agent in London during the American Civil War
- Thomas Underwood Dudley (1837–1904), bishop of Kentucky in the Episcopal Church
- Tom Dudley, ship's captain involved a celebrated 19th century cannibalism trial
- Bang Bang (Dubliner) (1906–1981), real name Thomas Dudley, Dublin eccentric
