= Consulate of the United States, Liverpool =

First American consulate overseas

Consulate of the United States in Liverpool
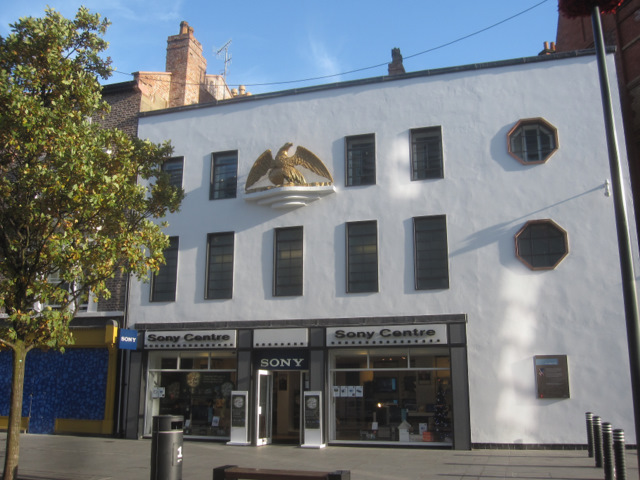
- former consulate building

- Location within Liverpool

General information
- Location: Paradise Street, Liverpool, England
- Coordinates: 53.404°N 2.986°W
- Inaugurated: 1790

The United States Consulate in Liverpool, England, was established in 1790, and was the first overseas consulate founded by the then fledgling United States of America. Liverpool was at the time an important center for transatlantic commerce and a vital trading partner for the former Thirteen Colonies. Among those who served the United States as consul in Liverpool were the writer Nathaniel Hawthorne, the spy Thomas Haines Dudley, and John S. Service, who was driven out of the United States Foreign Service by McCarthyite persecution. After World War II, as Liverpool declined in importance as an international port, the consulate was eventually closed down. The American Consulate in Liverpool was situated on the third floor of the Cunard building on the Pierhead and permanently closed in 1975.

== History ==
The first consul was James Maury, who held the office from 1790 to 1829, and whose portrait still hangs today in Liverpool Town Hall.

In 1801 Maury chaired the inaugural meeting of the American Chamber of Commerce in Liverpool, representing Liverpool merchants trading with the United States. Maury was the first signatory to the society's rules and was its first President. Maury held the position of consul for 39 years, until 1829, when he was removed from office by President Andrew Jackson.

The consulate stood on the quayside of Steers Dock and the Pool of Liverpool. The building was decorated with a golden bald eagle, the national symbol of the United States and a reassuring sign to American sailors or travellers arriving at Liverpool docks.

According to Edwin Williams's New York Annual Register, published in 1835, United States Consuls were not paid, but were:

"in effect, agents for commerce and seamen. They receive no yearly salaries... and their compensation is derived from the fees which they are allowed by law. [They] are principally occupied in verifying, in various forms, the legality of the trade of the United States with foreign nations, and in relieving and sending home American seamen, who by accident or misfortune are left destitute".

=== Consul Nathaniel Hawthorne ===
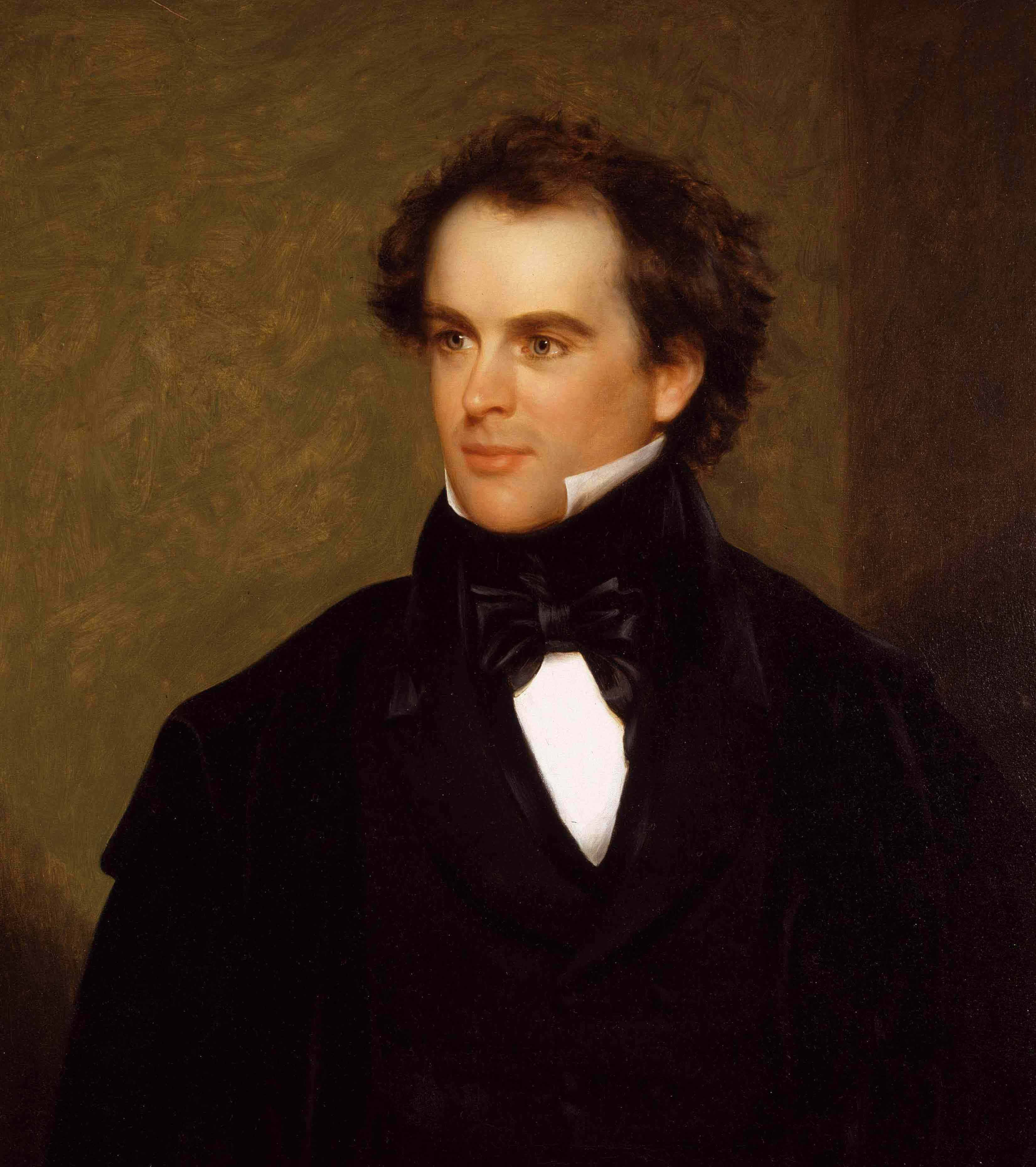
Nathaniel Hawthorne in 1841, a "prudent and efficient" consul.

Among other notable consuls was the author Nathaniel Hawthorne, appointed by President Franklin Pierce in 1853, shortly after the publication of Tanglewood Tales. The position was considered the most lucrative foreign service position at the time, and was described by Hawthorne's wife as "second in dignity to the Embassy in London". However, life in Liverpool was evidently expensive, and Hawthorne complained to the Secretary of State that he was underpaid, and asked for living expenses of $7,500, arguing that a consul:

"cannot possibly live here with a family (unless he secludes himself from society and forgoes all the social advantages of a residence in England). A man might be comfortable with this in a New England village, but not, I assure you, as the representative of America in the greatest commercial city in England".

In 1855 this was done. Congress passed a law fixing the salary of the consul at Liverpool at $7,500 per year.

Hawthorne described in his journal the American seamen with whom he dealt as "most rascally set of sailors that ever were seen - dirty, desperate, and altogether pirate-like in aspect". It appears that he often found his consular duties to be a burden:

"the duties of the office carried me to prisons, police-courts, hospitals, lunatic asylums, coroner's inquests, death-beds, funerals, and brought me in contact with insane people, criminals, ruined speculators, wild adventurers, diplomatists, brother-consuls, and all manner of simpletons and unfortunates, in greater number and variety than I had ever dreamed of as pertaining to America, in addition to whom there was an equivalent multitude of English rogues, dexterously counterfeiting the genuine yankee article."

Hawthorne was retired from the position in 1857, having apparently discharged his duties in a "prudent and efficient manner"

=== American Civil War ===
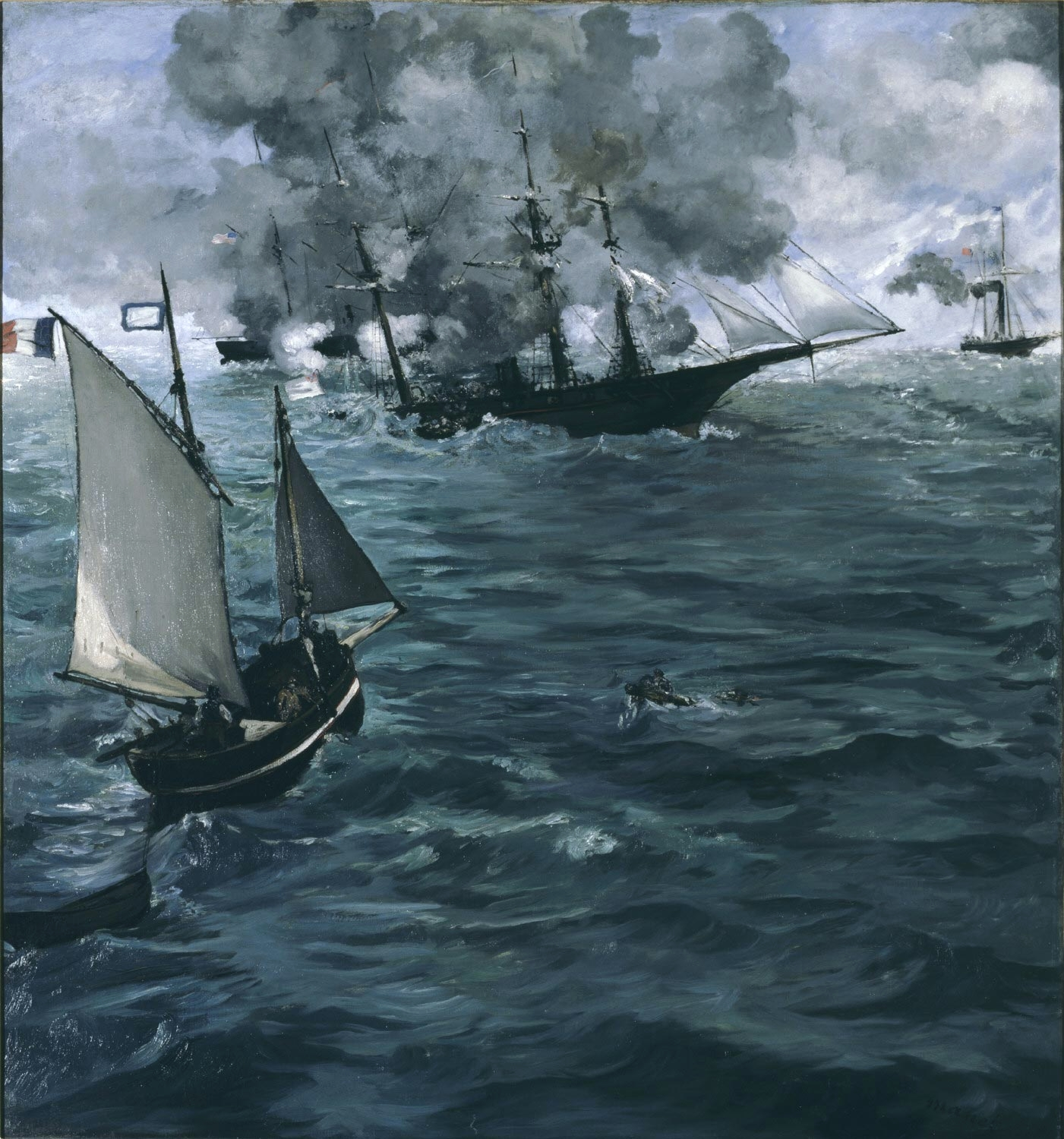
CSS Alabama and the USS Kearsarge, painted by Édouard Manet.

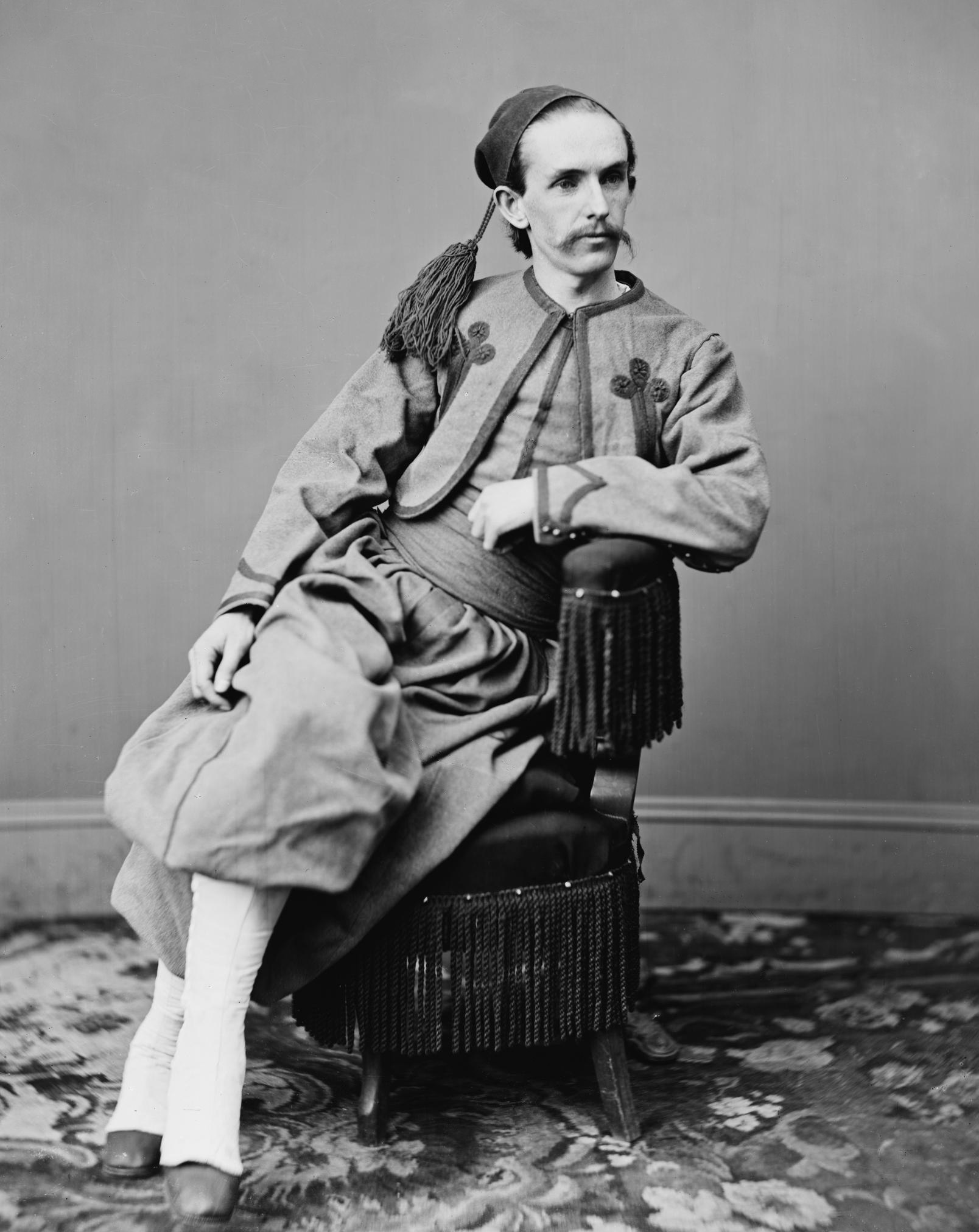
John Surratt, one of the conspirators involved in the assassination of President Abraham Lincoln, took refuge in Liverpool.

During the American Civil War (1861–65), consul Thomas Haines Dudley made strenuous efforts to prevent ships from Liverpool from breaking the United States Navy blockade of Confederate ports. Great Britain remained officially neutral throughout the war but there were many Confederate sympathisers in Liverpool. The commerce raider CSS Alabama was a screw sloop-of-war built for the Confederate States Navy at Birkenhead in Merseyside in 1862 by John Laird Sons and Company. She was eventually sunk by the USS Kearsarge in 1864. British merchants in Liverpool financed blockade runners that sent munitions and luxuries through the Union blockade to Confederate ports in return for cotton and tobacco.

In 1865, following the assassination of U.S. President Abraham Lincoln by John Wilkes Booth, vice consul Wilding notified his masters in Washington that John Surratt, one of Booth's conspirators, had taken refuge in Liverpool. Surratt had fled to Europe with the help of Confederate agents, booking passage under an alias and landing at Liverpool in September 1865, where he went into hiding in the oratory of the Church of the Holy Cross. Curiously, the United States Government chose not to pursue Surratt any further, despite having offered a $25,000 for information leading to his arrest, and no request was ever made to the British authorities to detain him. In any event Surratt did not stay long in Liverpool, but went on to serve for a brief time in the Ninth Company of the Pontifical Zouaves in the Vatican City under the name John Watson.

Consul Dudley wished to retire after the war and return to his law practice in New Jersey, but such was his knowledge of Confederate assets in Liverpool that he stayed on as consul, seizing Confederate ships and returning the proceeds of sale to the victorious United States Government. Relations between Britain and the United States were tense after the war, in part because of the role of Liverpool blockade runners and commerce raiders and the widespread perception in America that Britain had been sympathetic to the defeated Confederacy. The claims arising out of these disputes, especially the Alabama Claims, would not be settled until the 1871 Treaty of Washington.

=== 20th century ===
After World War II, Liverpool declined in importance as a trading partner with the United States, and the consulate was eventually closed down. Among the last holders of the office were George H. Steuart and John S. Service. The latter had been driven out of the Foreign Service by Senator Joseph McCarthy on suspicion of communist sympathies. Eventually the building fell into disuse, and for a period of time became The Eagle pub.

=== Restoration and repair ===
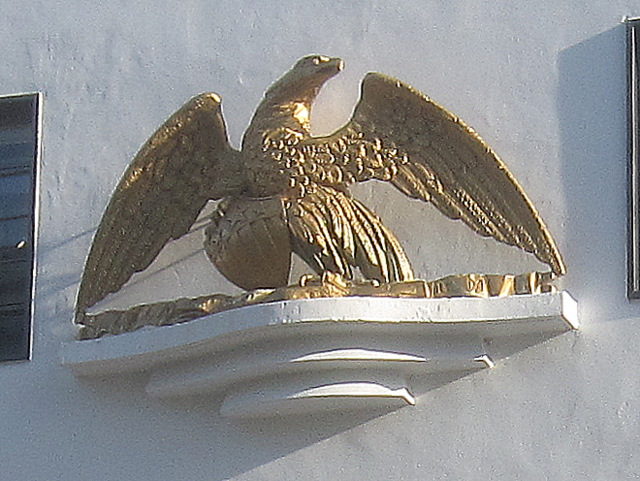
Close-up view of the restored eagle at Paradise St

Maury's former office now sits amid Liverpool's newest and largest shopping centre, Liverpool One. Once derelict and empty, it was the first building purchased by The Grosvenor Group in preparation of "The Paradise Street Project", an extensive redevelopment of Liverpool's central business district. The building, and the eagle which adorned it, were restored by the Grosvenor Group in 2008. The building has since been converted into a retail unit, leased by The Liverpool Sony Centre, and in addition houses three luxury apartments. Since December 2014 it has housed a branch of Cote Bistro.

The bald eagle which now graces the facade may or may not be the original carving installed when the building was first erected. The original carving is likely to have been imported from the United States, probably fashioned by shipwrights skilled in the carving of ships' figureheads. In any event, what remained of the 200 kg eagle was removed for renovation in 2008 and taken to the National Conservation Centre (part of National Museums Liverpool) for cleaning and restoration. The sculpture, by now in an advanced state of decay, had to be dried out for several months, following which a new head was carved, based on photos (the original head having been lost), and in addition new wing tips and a new lower base. The restored eagle was re-attached to the building in October 2008, during a small ceremony. David Whitty, who supervised the restoration of the eagle, was quoted as saying that it "should be good for another 200 years".

== Notable Consuls ==
- 1790–1829 James Maury
- 1853–1857 Nathaniel Hawthorne
- 1861–1872 Thomas Haines Dudley
- 1878–1885 Stephen B. Packard
- 1959–1962 John S. Service
