= James Maury (consul) =

American diplomat

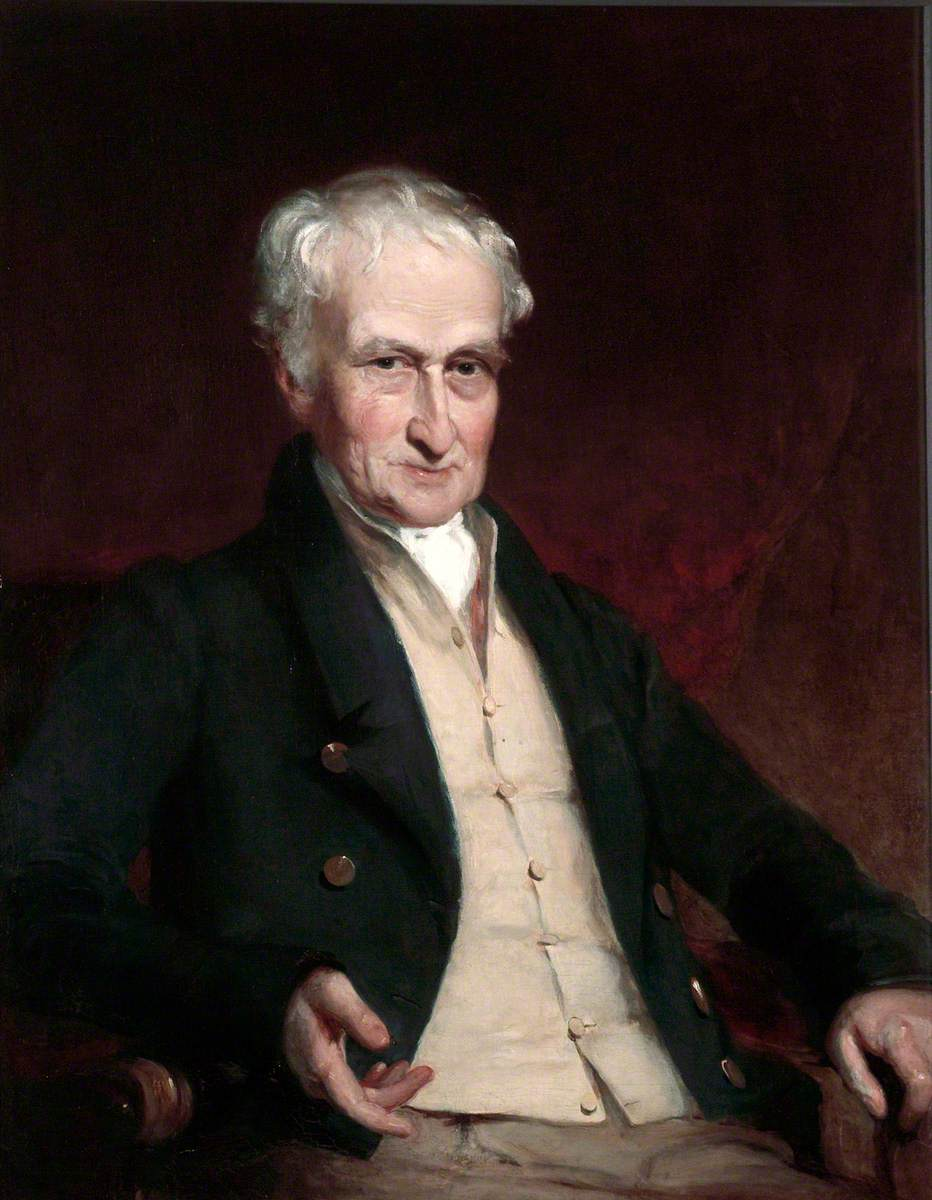
- Portrait of Maury by Gilbert Stuart Newton
- Born: February 3, 1746; Albemarle County, Virginia, U.S.
- Died: February 23, 1840 (aged 94); New York, New York, U.S.
- Occupations: Consul, Foreign Service
- Employer: United States Government
- Known for: Consulate of the United States in Liverpool
- Title: Consul

James Maury (February 3, 1746 – February 23, 1840) was one of the first United States diplomats and one of the first American consuls appointed overseas. In 1790 he was appointed to the Consulate of the United States in Liverpool, one of the first overseas consulates founded by the then fledgling United States of America. Maury held the position of consul for 39 years until he was removed from office by President Andrew Jackson in 1829.

== Early life ==
James Maury was born in February 1746 in Albemarle County, Virginia. He was the son of The Reverend James Maury (1719–1769), an educator and Anglican cleric in the American colonies, of Huguenot ancestry. Among The Reverend Maury's notable pupils were Thomas Jefferson and James Madison, the First Bishop of Virginia. Young James attended his father's school and was part of a class of five pupils that included Jefferson. Maury frequently accompanied Jefferson to the latter's home on Saturdays when school was not in session

== Consul at Liverpool ==
Secretary of State Jefferson petitioned the then United States President George Washington for an appointment for his former classmate of two years. The petition was successful, and Maury, who was already living and working as a merchant in Liverpool, was appointed consul of the United States at Liverpool in 1790.

The Consulate of the United States in Liverpool was one of the first overseas consulates founded by the then fledgling United States. Liverpool was at the time an important center for Transatlantic commerce and a vital trading partner for the former Thirteen Colonies.

In 1801 Maury chaired the inaugural meeting of the American Chamber of Commerce in Liverpool, representing Liverpool merchants trading with the United States. Maury was the first signatory to the society's rules and was its first President.

Maury held the position of consul for 39 years under six U.S. presidents, until 1829, when he was removed from office by President Andrew Jackson. A Silver platter was presented to him by the merchants of Liverpool after his forty years of service. The inscription reads: "Presented by the merchants and other inhabitants of Liverpool to James Maury, Esq., Late Consul of the United States of America in that Town as a mark of general respect on his removal from an Office which he had honourably held for forty years, 1829."

Maury's Liverpool residence is identified as number 4 Rodney St. However he is also recorded (Gores directories) as occupying nos 37, 38 and 44. His portrait, painted by Gilbert Stuart Newton, still hangs today in the West Reception Room in Liverpool Town Hall.

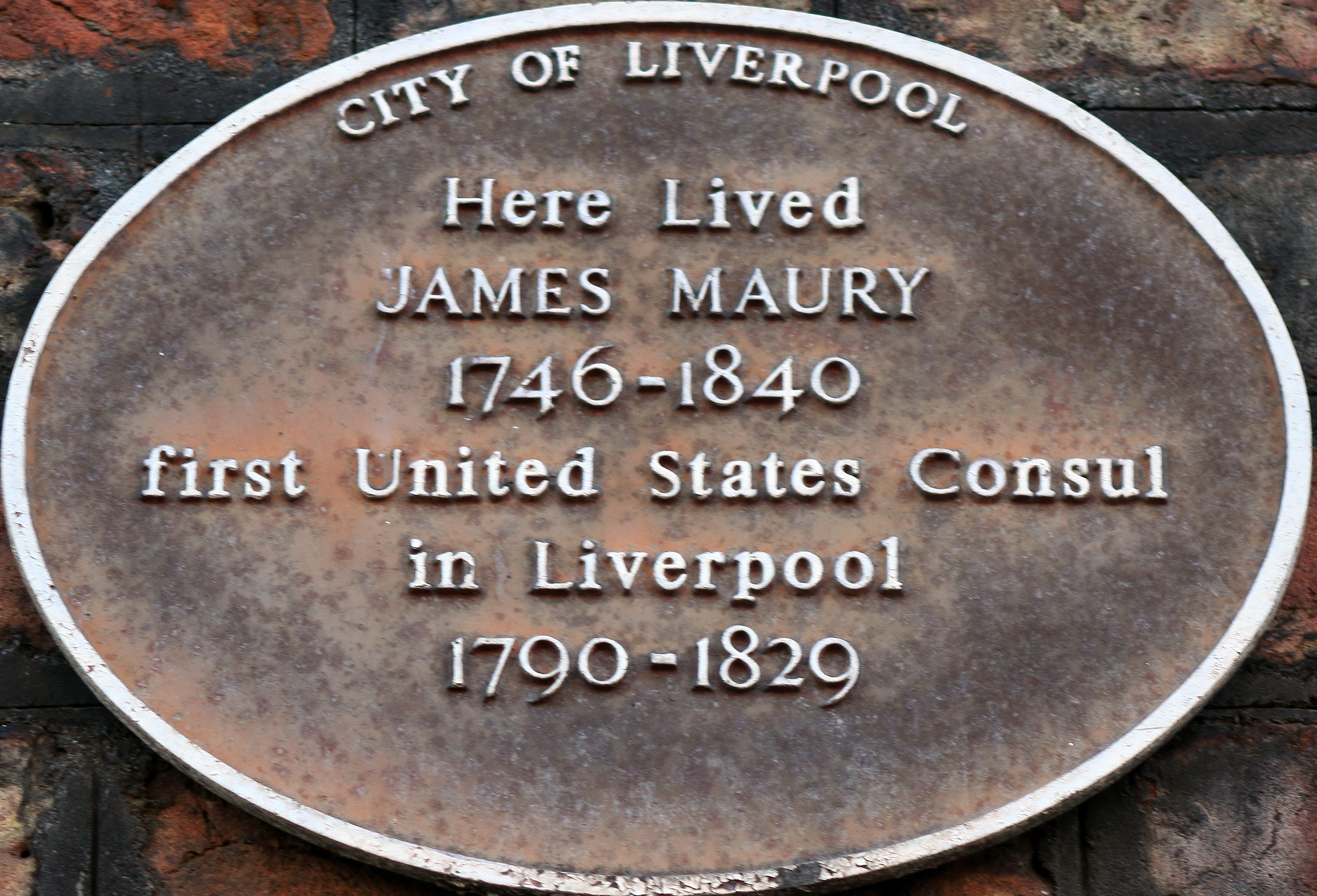
Plaque at 4 Rodney Street

== Personal life ==
Maury was married twice, firstly to Catherine Armistead, and secondly to Margaret Rutson. He and Rutson had five children: James Sifrein Maury (1797–1864); William Maury (1799–1849); Matthew Maury (1800–1877); Ann Maury (1803–1876); Rutson Maury (1805–1882). Ann Maury conducted considerable research on her family history and published a substantial genealogical chart of the Maury family, which can be still be obtained from The Fontaine Maury Society library.

James Maury died February 23, 1840, in New York City and is buried in Green-Wood Cemetery.
