= Jim Lee (disambiguation) =

Jim Lee is a comic book artist.

Jim Lee may also refer to:

- Jim Lee (photographer) (1945–2023), British photographer and film director
- Jim Lee (broadcaster), radio announcer
- Jim Lee (record producer)
- Jim Lee (sprinter) (born 1945), American sprinter, 1966 All-American for the Maryland Terrapins track and field team
- Jim Lee (businessman), see Trey Gowdy#Electoral history

== See also ==
- James Lee (disambiguation)
- Jimmy Lee (disambiguation)
