= George E. Read =

American sailor

- Civil War era Navy Medal of Honor
- Born: July 27, 1837; Rhode Island, US
- Died: December 7, 1910 (aged 73); Bristol, Rhode Island, US
- Burial place: Ancient Littleneck Cemetery, East Providence, Rhode Island
- Military career
- Allegiance: United States of America; Union
- Branch: United States Navy; Union Navy
- Rank: Seaman
- Unit: (United States Navy) USS Kearsarge
- Conflicts: American Civil War
- Awards: Medal of Honor

George E. Read (1838–1910) was an American sailor who received the Medal of Honor for valor in action during the American Civil War.

== Biography ==
Read was born in Rhode Island in 1838. On June 19, 1864, he served as a Seaman on the sloop of war USS Kearsarge (1861) when she sank the commerce raider CSS Alabama off Cherbourg, France. He was awarded his Medal of Honor for gallantry under fire exhibited while crewing the ship's Number 2 gun.

Read died in 1910 and was buried in Ancient Littleneck Cemetery in East Providence, Rhode Island.

== Medal of Honor citation ==
Rank and organization: Seaman, U.S. Navy. Born: 1838, Rhode Island. Accredited to: Rhode Island. G.O. No.: 45, December 31, 1864

Citation:

Served as seaman on board the U.S.S. Kearsarge when she destroyed the Alabama off Cherbourg, France, 19 June 1864. Acting as the first loader of the No. 2 gun during this bitter engagement, Read exhibited marked coolness and good conduct and was highly recommended for his gallantry under fire by his divisional officer.

== See also ==
- List of American Civil War Medal of Honor recipients: Q–S
