= Jimmy Lee =

Jimmy Lee may refer to:

== People (as a full name) ==
- Jimmy Lee (banker) (James B. Lee, Jr.), investment banker and financier for JP Morgan Chase, Chase Manhattan bank and originally Chemical Bank
- Jimmy Lee (journalist) (born c. 1970), Korean-American journalist
- Jimmy Lee (footballer) (1892–1955), footballer for Aston Villa and Stoke
- Jimmy Lee Duggar (1936–2009), father of American reality TV star Jim Bob Duggar, see 19 Kids and Counting

== Songs ==
- "Jimmy Lee" (song), a 1987 hit single by Aretha Franklin

== Fictional characters ==
- Jimmy Lee, character in video game series Double Dragon
- Jimmy Lee Holt, a character on the television soap opera General Hospital

== People (as a first name) ==
- Jimmy Lee Swaggart, a televangelist, known for his involvement in a high-profile 1988 sex scandal
- Jimmy Lee Smith, convicted of murder documented in The Onion Field
- Jimmy Lee Gray (1948–1983), convicted murderer executed in Mississippi
- Jimmy Lee Fautheree, an American rockabilly singer
- Jimmy Lee Sudduth (1910–2007), outsider artist and blues musician from Fayette, Alabama

== See also ==
- Jim Lee (disambiguation)
- James Lee (disambiguation)
