= John Hayes (sailor) =

American Civil War Medal of Honor recipient

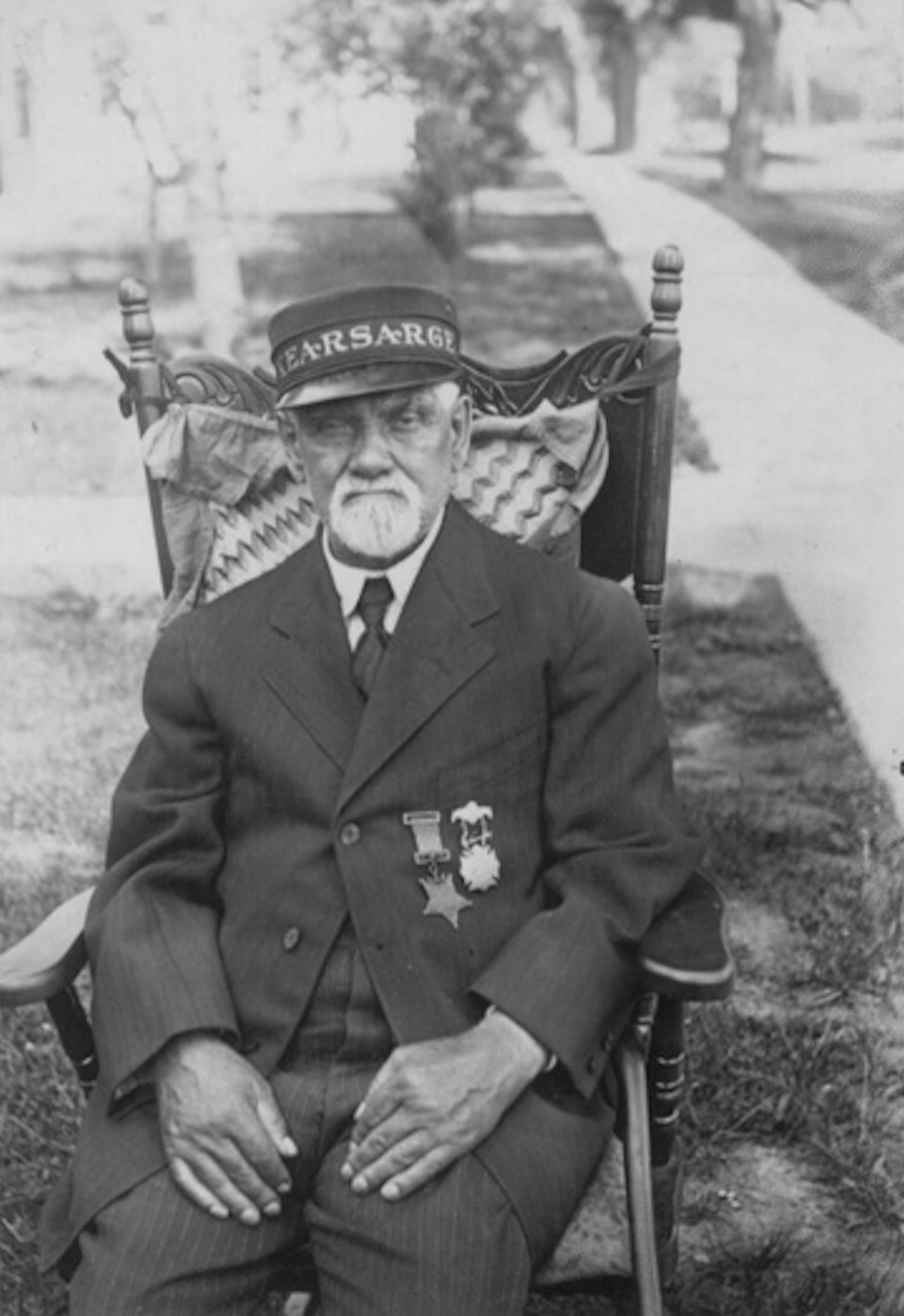
- Hayes in c. 1898
- Born: July 20, 1832; Colony of Newfoundland, British North America
- Died: January 28, 1911 (aged 78); Blairstown, Iowa
- Military career
- Allegiance: United States
- Branch: United States Navy
- Service years: 1861 - 1864, 1865 - 1868
- Rank: Coxswain
- Unit: USS Kearsarge
- Conflicts: Civil War: Battle of Cherbourg
- Awards: Medal of Honor

John Hayes (20 July 1832 - 28 January 1911) was a veteran of the American Civil War and a recipient of the Medal of Honor.

== Biography ==
Hayes was born in the Colony of Newfoundland, but left his home at an early age to work on British and American merchant vessels in the years leading up to the Civil War. He joined the United States Navy in December 1861. He served throughout the Civil War and was discharged in August 1868.

Later in 1868, Hayes moved to Milwaukee, Wisconsin and served on several ships that sailed the Great Lakes. He soon abandoned his naval lifestyle and settled down on a farm in Wisconsin and married. Near the end of his life, Hayes moved to Blairstown, Iowa, to be near his daughter. He died in January 1911.

== Battle of Cherbourg ==
In June 1864, Hayes was serving as the second captain of the number two gun of the USS Kearsarge. The ship was pursuing the CSS Alabama, a successful commerce raiding ship. On June 19, 1864, the Kearsarge found the Alabama off of the coast of the French port of Cherbourg. The two ships battled, and the Alabama was destroyed in less than an hour. The accuracy of the gun operated by Hayes was instrumental in sinking the Alabama. Hayes received the Medal of Honor for his actions during the battle.

== Citation ==
Served on board the U.S.S. Kearsarge when she destroyed the Alabama off Cherbourg, France, 19 June 1864. Acting as second captain of the No. 2 gun during this bitter engagement, Hayes exhibited marked coolness and good conduct and was highly recommended for his gallantry under fire by the divisional officer.

== See also ==
- List of Medal of Honor recipients
- List of American Civil War Medal of Honor recipients: G–L
- Battle of Cherbourg (1864)
- CSS Alabama
- USS Kearsarge
