= James Saunders (Medal of Honor) =

Quartermaster James Saunders
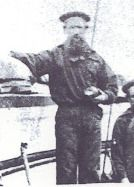
- Born: c. 1809; Massachusetts
- Died: Unknown
- Military career
- Allegiance: United States
- Branch: Navy
- Rank: Chief Quartermaster
- Unit: USS Kearsarge
- Conflicts: Cherbourg, France
- Awards: Medal of Honor

James Saunders (c. 1809 - unknown) was a quartermaster in the United States Navy who was awarded the Presidential Medal of Honor for gallantry during the American Civil War. Summers was awarded the medal on 31 December 1864 for actions performed off the coast of Cherbourg, France, on 19 June 1864.

== Personal life ==
Saunders was born in Massachusetts in 1809. His home of residence was listed as Boston.

== Military service ==
Saunders enlisted in the navy as a quartermaster in Boston, Massachusetts, serving on the sloop-of-war USS Kearsarge. He reached the rank of Chief Quartermaster before his release. On 19 June 1864, USS Kearsarge engaged and sunk CSS Alabama, a privateer run commerce raider, in the Battle of Cherbourg. Saunders was one of 17 men awarded the Medal of Honor for actions performed in the engagement.

Saunders' Medal of Honor citation reads:

The President of the United States of America, in the name of Congress, takes pleasure in presenting the Medal of Honor to Quartermaster James Saunders, United States Navy, for extraordinary heroism in action as quartermaster on board the U.S.S. Kearsarge when she destroyed the Alabama off Cherbourg, France, 19 June 1864. Carrying out his duties courageously throughout the bitter engagement, Quartermaster Saunders was prompt in reporting damages done to both ships, and it is testified to by Commodore Winslow that he is deserving of all commendation, both for gallantry and for encouragement of others in his division.

— E. M. Stanton, Secretary of War
