= Robert Strahan =

American sailor

- Civil War era Navy Medal of Honor
- Born: 21 March 1838; New Jersey
- Died: Unknown
- Military career
- Allegiance: United States of America; Union
- Branch: United States Navy; Union Navy
- Unit: USS Kearsarge
- Conflicts: American Civil War
- Awards: Medal of Honor

Robert Strahan (born 21 March 1838) was an American sailor who received the Medal of Honor for valor in action during the American Civil War.

== Biography ==
Strahan was born on 21 March 1838 in New Jersey. On June 19, 1864 he was serving as Captain of the Top on the sloop of war USS Kearsarge when she sank the commerce raider CSS Alabama off Cherbourg, France. He was awarded his Medal of Honor for gallantry under fire exhibited while crewing the ship's Number 1 gun. He left the service before his Medal of Honor was awarded and is currently on display at the National Museum of the United States Navy.

== Medal of Honor citation ==
Rank and organization: Captain of the Top, U.S. Navy. Birth: New Jersey. G.O. No.: 45, December 31, 1864. Accredited to: New Jersey.

Citation:

Served as captain of the top on board the U.S.S. Kearsarge when she destroyed the Alabama off Cherbourg, France, 19 June 1864. Acting as captain of the No. 1 gun, Strahan carried out his duties in the face of heavy enemy fire and exhibited marked coolness and good conduct throughout the engagement. Strahan was highly recommended by his division officer for his gallantry and meritorious achievements.

== See also ==
- List of American Civil War Medal of Honor recipients: Q–S
