= Mark G. Ham =

American sailor in the Civil War (c. 1820 – 1869)

- Civil War era Navy Medal of Honor
- Born: c. 1820; Portsmouth, New Hampshire, US
- Died: 1869 (aged 48–49)
- Burial place: Harmony Grove Cemetery; Portsmouth, New Hampshire
- Military career
- Allegiance: United States of America; Union
- Branch: Union Navy
- Unit: (United States Navy) USS Kearsarge
- Conflicts: American Civil War
- Awards: Medal of Honor

Mark G. Ham (c. 1820 – 1869) was an American sailor who received the Medal of Honor for valor in action during the American Civil War.

== Biography ==
Ham was born in Portsmouth, New Hampshire. He was a member of the crew of USS Kearsarge when she sank the commerce raider CSS Alabama on June 19, 1864 off Cherbourg, France. During this action, he distinguished himself under heavy fire from the enemy.

Ham is buried in Harmony Grove Cemetery in Portsmouth, New Hampshire.

== Medal of Honor citation ==
Rank and Organization: Carpenter's Mate, U.S. Navy. Born: 1820, Portsmouth, N.H. Accredited To: New Hampshire. G.O. No.: 45, December 31, 1864.

Citation:

Served on board the U.S.S. Kearsarge when she destroyed the Alabama off Cherbourg, France, June 19, 1864. Performing his duties intelligently and faithfully, Ham distinguished himself in the face of the bitter enemy fire and was highly commended by his divisional officer.

== See also ==
- USS Kearsarge
- CSS Alabama
- Cherbourg
- List of Medal of Honor recipients
- List of American Civil War Medal of Honor recipients: G–L
