= Thomas Haines Dudley =

American diplomat (1819–1893)

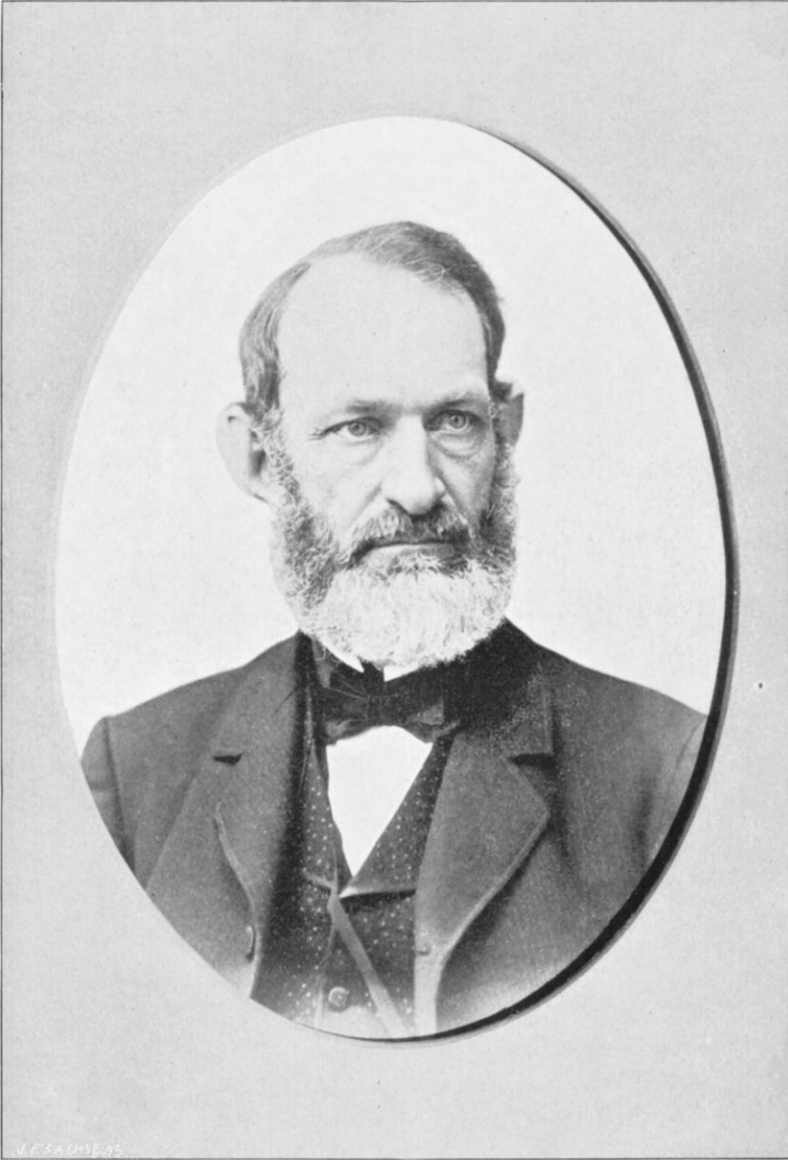

Thomas Haines Dudley (9 October 1819 – 15 April 1893) was consul of the United States of America in Liverpool during the American Civil War.

He was instrumental in leading efforts by the Federal Government to prevent British involvement in the war, and in particular in preventing blockade runners from Liverpool, such as the CSS Alabama, from assisting the Confederate war effort.

== Early life ==
=== Family and childhood ===
Thomas Haines Dudley was born in Burlington County, New Jersey on October 9, 1819, to Evan and Ann Dudley. Evan Dudley died when Haines Dudley was two years old. He was raised as a Quaker by his mother. Dudley was the youngest of four children.

=== Marriage and children ===
On March 4, 1846, Dudley married Emaline Matlack. They had four children together named Edward, Mary, Ellen and Henry. The youngest, named after Dudley's idol, Henry Clay, died at the age of two.

=== Early career ===
Dudley began his career as a school teacher and later began to study law under William N. Jeffers in Camden, New Jersey. He was admitted to the bar in 1845. As a lawyer he was active in anti-slavery affairs. His first case found him disguising himself as a slave trader to retrieve a free black mother and her children from southern slaveholders. Dudley was successful in his rescue attempt and was assisted by funds amassed by The Society of Friends, a Quaker organization located in Camden. By 1850, Dudley had held more prominent local positions like city treasurer of Camden, city solicitor, and chairman of the New Jersey executive committee for the Republican Party.

=== Health ===
In March 1856, when he was 37 years old, Dudley was involved in an accident involving a fire aboard the Steamboat New Jersey. As a result of this fire, fifty people died. When Dudley was pulled from the steamboat, he was near death. While he did ultimately recover, he was plagued by health and nervous system issues for the duration of his life. These health issues ultimately contributed to his decision to be stationed in Liverpool for his tenure as consul.

== Political contributions ==
In 1852 Dudley was appointed as a member of the Whig State Executive Committee and contributed to Winfield Scott’s campaign. By 1860 he had become chairman of the Republican State Executive Committee of New Jersey. Dudley was eventually chosen as delegate-at-large for New Jersey at the Republican Convention in 1860. Dudley campaigned for Abraham Lincoln and worked to persuade the delegates from New Jersey to vote for Lincoln. Dudley, a Republican who fought for the protective tariff plank and was against slavery, was pivotal in the election of Abraham Lincoln and according to David Davis, another member of the Republican State Executive Committee stated: “Few men ... deserve more at the hands of the administration.” Another New Jersey delegate, Charles P. Smith, also stated that, “as a fact beyond contradiction, that had it not been for [Dudley’s] services, Mr. Lincoln would not have been nominated”.

== American Civil War ==
=== Appointment as Consul ===
After Abraham Lincoln’s election as president he offered Dudley the choice between an official appointment as Minister of Japan or Consul at Liverpool. Lincoln hoped that Dudley would take the post as Minister of Japan because he planned to appoint Gustave Koerner to the Consulship at Liverpool. Ultimately, Dudley chose the Consul at Liverpool because of the availability of superior medical advice that he needed for the duration of his life as a result of the steamboat accident in 1856. Dudley and his family traveled to Liverpool on the steamer Africa and arrived on November 19, 1861. He assumed his duties on November 20, 1861. He appointed Henry Wilding as his Vice Consul.

=== Spy efforts during the War ===
During the American Civil War (1861–1865), consul Dudley made strenuous efforts to prevent ships from Liverpool from breaking the United States Navy blockade of Confederate ports. Upon his arrival to Liverpool, the steamship Oreto was the first ship he noticed that had Confederate ties. He sent proof that the Oreto was owned by the Confederates to William H. Seward and Charles Francis Adams.

Great Britain remained officially neutral throughout the war but there were many Confederate sympathizers in Liverpool. The commerce raider CSS Alabama was a screw sloop-of-war built for the Confederate States Navy at Birkenhead in Merseyside in 1862 by John Laird Sons and Company. She was eventually sunk by the USS Kearsarge in 1864. British merchants in Liverpool financed blockade runners that sent munitions and luxuries through the Union blockade to Confederate ports in return for cotton and tobacco.

As Consul Dudley was responsible for reporting over 120 suspicious steamers to the United States in addition to a large number of sailing vessels.

The British required proof of Dudley’s allegations that there were blockade runners and warships being built to aid the Confederates. One of Dudley's tasks, as Consul, was to provide this proof and prepare the legal case. He used affidavits as his primary source of evidence. These affidavits specified the features of the questionable ships to determine if they were made for war, and confirmed that James D. Bulloch had a connection with the Confederate government and played a role in the materials that were used on the boats in the shipyards. Dudley also hired a private investigator, Matthew Maguire. In his role, Maguire would locate citizens like Clarence Randolph Yonge, the paymaster on the C.S.S. Alabama, to testify as witnesses in the legal cases. Through Dudley’s legal work, he was responsible for the detainment of many prominent Confederate ships housed in the Liverpool shipyards like the C.S.S. Alabama and the gunboat Alexandria.

Dudley wished to retire after the war and return to his law practice in New Jersey, but such was his knowledge of Confederate assets in Liverpool that he stayed on as consul, seizing Confederate ships and returning the proceeds of sale to the victorious United States Government. Relations between Britain and the United States were tense after the war, in part because of the role of Liverpool blockade runners and commerce raiders and the widespread perception in America that Britain had been sympathetic to the defeated Confederacy. The claims arising out of these disputes, especially the Alabama Claims, would not be settled until the 1871 Treaty of Washington.

== Post Civil War ==
Thomas Haines Dudley submitted his resignation to the state department in the fall of 1872. Upon his return to the United States he opened a law practice with his son Edward and also served as president of multiple companies including the Pittsburgh, Titusville, and Buffalo Railroads as well as the New Jersey Mining Company and the Bar Association of Camden. Dudley served on the boards of the Camden, Atlantic, and West Jersey Railroad as well as the Camden and Philadelphia Ferry Company and was the first vice president of the American Protective Tariff League. In 1880, he was elected as a member to the American Philosophical Society.

== Death ==
Thomas Haines Dudley died at the age of 73 on April 15, 1893, of a massive heart attack in Broad Street Station in Philadelphia. Upon his death his eulogy, published by the Camden Post stated:

Deeply religious in the Quaker sense, which makes each man alone responsible to his Maker and not to conventional ceremony, he was more spiritual minded than a practical prosaic lawyer and man of affairs would be taken to be, but never wore his heart upon his sleeve save to familiars. Hated by many through the prejudice and misconception engendered in political strife (as strong characters often are), misunderstood by many more because he would not stoop to conquer, he pursued the even tenor of his way in the respect and love of his confidants. Rarely heading public subscriptions, he was instant in good ways and works, and most of his generous benefactions were only known to the needy recipients.
