= Michael Aheam =

Union Navy Medal of Honor recipient

Michael Ahern
- Civil War era Navy Medal of Honor
- Born: County Cork, Ireland
- Died: Unknown
- Military career
- Allegiance: United States of America; Union
- Branch: Union Navy
- Rank: Paymaster's Steward
- Unit: USS Kearsarge (1861)
- Conflicts: American Civil War: Battle of Cherbourg (1864)
- Awards: Medal of Honor

Michael Aheam (or true surname Ahern; died 1907) was an Irish-American sailor born in County Cork, Ireland. He received the Medal of Honor for valor in action during the American Civil War. There is an Ahern family genealogy that has a Michael Ahern listed, who was born in County Cork about 1834, but there is no reference to any Civil War Union Navy service of any kind.

Aheam was illegally recruited in Queenstown, Ireland in November 1863 along with several others, and officially enlisted in the US Navy from France. He served as a Paymaster's Steward aboard the USS Kearsarge during her battle with the commerce raider CSS Alabama on June 19, 1864, off Cherbourg, France. His Medal of Honor citation (dated December 31, 1864) noted that he had been "highly recommended" by his divisional officer after "carrying out his duties courageously" and exhibiting "gallantry under enemy fire" with "marked coolness and good conduct". He was one of seventeen Kearsarge sailors who received the medal for valor during this battle.

== Medal of Honor citation ==
Rank and organization: Paymaster's Steward, U.S. Navy. Enlisted in: France. G.O. No.: 45, December 31, 1864.

Citation:

Served on board the U.S.S. Kearsarge when she destroyed the Alabama off Cherbourg, France, June 19, 1864. Carrying out his duties courageously, PmS. Aheam exhibited marked coolness and good conduct and was highly recommended by his divisional officer for gallantry under enemy fire.

== See also ==
- List of American Civil War Medal of Honor recipients: A–F
