= William S. Bond (Medal of Honor) =

- Civil War era Navy Medal of Honor
- Born: c. 1839; Boston, Massachusetts
- Died: March 17, 1892; Vallejo, California
- Burial place: Sunrise Memorial Cemetery
- Military career
- Allegiance: United States of America
- Branch: United States Navy
- Service years: 1862–1864
- Rank: Boatswain's Mate
- Unit: USS Kearsarge
- Conflicts: Battle of Cherbourg (1864)
- Awards: Medal of Honor

Boatswain's Mate William S. Bond (c. 1839 to March 17, 1892) was an American soldier who fought in the American Civil War. Bond received the country's highest award for bravery during combat, the Medal of Honor, for his action aboard the USS Kearsarge near Cherbourg-Octeville, France on June 19, 1864. He was honored with the award on 31 December 1864.

== Biography ==
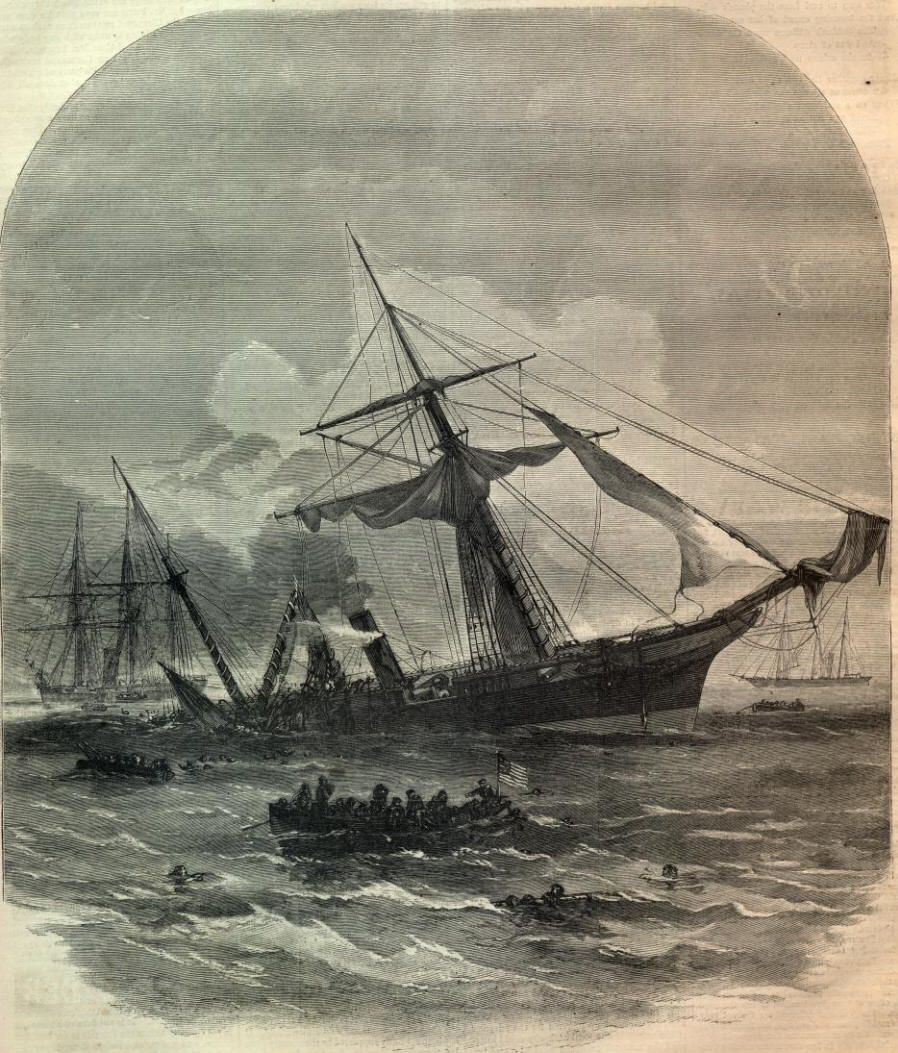
The sinking of the Alabama

Bond was born in 1839 in Boston, Massachusetts, and enlisted into United States Navy aboard the Union warship USS Kearsarge on 16 January 1862.

On 19 June 1864 Bond was aboard the Kearsarge, under command of captain John Ancrum Winslow in its hunt for the CSS Alabama. The Alabama was discovered anchored for repairs at the Cherbourg Harbor, France. Both ships headed for battle outside of French waters and what became known as the Battle of Cherbourg ensued. The Alabama was sunk within hours. Bond, along with sixteen other members of the Kearsarge crew, was awarded with the Medal of Honor for their gallantry during this battle.

Bond died on 17 March 1892 in Vallejo, California, and his remains are interred at the Sunrise Memorial Cemetery.

== Medal of Honor citation ==
Served on board the U.S.S. Kearsarge when she destroyed the Alabama off Cherbourg, France, 19 June 1864. Carrying out his duties courageously, William Bond exhibited marked coolness and good conduct and was highly recommended for his gallantry under fire by his divisional officer.

== See also ==
- List of American Civil War Medal of Honor recipients: A–F
