= George H. Harrison =

U.S. Medal of Honor recipient

- Civil War era Navy Medal of Honor
- Born: April 9, 1841; Middleton, Massachusetts
- Died: January 18, 1919 (aged 76)
- Burial place: Forestdale Cemetery, Malden, Massachusetts
- Military career
- Allegiance: United States of America; Union
- Branch: United States Navy; Union Navy
- Service years: 1862 - 1864, 1865 - 1867
- Rank: Seaman
- Unit: (United States Navy) USS Kearsarge
- Conflicts: American Civil War
- Awards: Medal of Honor

George H. Harrison (April 9, 1841 – January 18, 1919) was an American sailor who received the Medal of Honor for valor in action during the American Civil War.

== Biography ==
Harrison was born on April 9, 1841, in Middleton, Massachusetts, and joined the Navy in March 1862. On June 19, 1864, he was serving on the sloop of war USS Kearsarge when she sank the commerce raider CSS Alabama off Cherbourg, France. He was awarded his Medal of Honor for gallantry under fire while crewing the ship's 11 inch pivot gun. He was discharged from the Navy in November 1864, but re-enlisted a few months later, serving until 1867.

Harrison died on January 18, 1919, and was buried in Forestdale Cemetery in Malden, Massachusetts.

== Medal of Honor citation ==
Rank and organization: Seaman, U.S. Navy. Born: 1842, Massachusetts. Accredited to: Massachusetts. G.O. No. 45, December 31, 1864.

Citation:

Served on board the U.S.S. Kearsarge when she destroyed the Alabama off Cherbourg, France, 19 June 1864. Acting as sponger and loader of the 11-inch pivot gun during the bitter engagement, Harrison exhibited marked coolness and good conduct and was highly recommended for his gallantry under fire by the divisional officer.

== See also ==
- List of American Civil War Medal of Honor recipients: G–L
- USS Kearsarge
- Battle of Cherbourg
