= James Leigh =

James Leigh may refer to:

- James Henry Leigh, English MP for Winchester
- James Mathews Leigh (1808–1860), English art educator and painter
- James Wentworth Leigh (1838–1923), English Anglican priest
- James Leigh (cricketer) (1862–1925), English cricketer

== See also ==
- James Lee (disambiguation)
- Leigh (disambiguation)
