= Thomas Dudley (engraver) =

Thomas Dudley (fl. 1670–1680), was an English engraver.

Dudley was a pupil of Wenceslaus Hollar, and his plates are etched in a manner resembling, but greatly inferior to, his master's style. A book-plate in the print room of the British Museum shows him to have had considerable technical skill, but his portraits and figures are ill drawn. His most important work was a series of etchings executed in 1678, representing the life of Æsop, from drawings by Francis Barlow, (now in the museum's print room), and added by Barlow to his second edition of the 'Fables' (1687).

A few portraits by him are known, including one of Titus Oates on a broadside, entitled 'A Prophecy of England's Future Happiness.' In 1679 he seems to have visited Lisbon in Portugal, as he engraved portraits of John IV and Peter II of Portugal, of Theodosius Lusitanus (1679), Bishop Russel of Portalegre (1679), and of a general, the last named (in the museum's print room) being signed 'Tho. Dudley Anglus fecit Vlissippone.'
