= James H. Lee =

United States Navy Medal of Honor recipient

- Born: 1840; Long Island, New York, US
- Died: August 9, 1877 (aged 36–37); Oswego, New York, US
- Military career
- Allegiance: United States of America; Union
- Branch: Union Navy
- Rank: Seaman
- Unit: USS Kearsarge
- Conflicts: American Civil War
- Awards: Medal of Honor

James H. Lee (1840 – August 9, 1877) was an American sailor who received the Medal of Honor for valor in action during the American Civil War.

== Biography ==
Lee was born on Long Island, New York in 1840 but his family moved to Buffalo while he was still a small child. Orphaned before the age of 10, he lived in Baldwinsville and North Stirling in upstate New York. He went to sea as a young man and embarked on a 3-year voyage in the Pacific Ocean. The Civil War had broken out by the time he returned to the United States and he enlisted in the U.S. Navy, reporting for duty at Boston.

On June 19, 1864 he was serving as a Seaman on the sloop of war USS Kearsarge when she fought the commerce raider CSS Alabama off Cherbourg, France. He was awarded his Medal of Honor for gallantry under fire while serving as the sponger of the ship's Number 1 gun. Lee didn't learn about his commendation until after he was discharged from the Navy, and said he had no idea what he had done during the battle to distinguish himself so highly.

After the war, Lee took up residence in Oswego, New York. He was noted by his neighbors as an intelligent and honest man who was "untiring in the discharge of every duty." He died there on August 9, 1877.

== Medal of Honor citation ==
Rank and organization: Seaman, U.S. Navy. Born: 1840, New York. Accredited to: New York. G.O. No.: 45, December 31, 1864.

Citation:

Served as seaman on board the U.S.S. Kearsarge when she destroyed the Alabama off Cherbourg, France, June 19, 1864. Acting as sponger of the No. 1 gun during this bitter engagement, Lee exhibited marked coolness and good conduct and was highly recommended for his gallantry under fire by the divisional officer.

== See also ==
- List of American Civil War Medal of Honor recipients: G–L
