= James Lee (cricketer, born 1838) =

English cricketer

James Edward Lee (23 March 1838 – 2 April 1880) was an English first-class cricketer, who played two matches for Yorkshire County Cricket Club in 1867. These were against Lancashire in the Roses Match at the Station Road Ground, Whalley, and versus Cambridgeshire in Dewsbury.

Born in Soothill, Dewsbury, Yorkshire, England, Lee scored a duck in his only innings in the Roses clash, as Yorkshire won by an innings. Lee scored 6 and 3 against Cambridgeshire in a low scoring match, which was won by Yorkshire by four wickets. Those were the only runs he scored in first-class cricket, and he did not bowl or take a catch.

He died in April 1880, aged 42, in Earlsheaton, Dewsbury.
