= James Lee (tenor) =

South Korean operatic tenor

James Lee (Korean: Jeong-Hwan Lee, born 1979) is a South Korean operatic tenor known for his performances in dramatic roles, particularly within the Italian opera repertoire. He has built an international career, primarily in Europe, while also performing in Asia and other regions.

== Early life and education ==
James Lee was born in South Korea and discovered his passion for music at a young age while singing in a church choir. He later studied vocal performance at Yeungnam University in Gyeongsan. He continued his education at the Robert Schumann Hochschule in Düsseldorf, Germany, under the guidance of Alexandru Ionitza, where he refined his operatic singing skills. Subsequently, he received further training from the Italian tenor Ernesto Veronelli.

== Career ==
James Lee began his professional career in South Korea, performing roles such as Alfred and Eisenstein in Die Fledermaus, Nemorino in L'elisir d'amore, and Pong in Turandot from 2008 to 2010. During this period, he also participated in contemporary Korean operas, including the role of Dong-i in Woo, Jong Uek’s Love of Buckwheat, the title role in Park, Chang Min’s Wangsan Heu-ui, and Mong-Wan in Lim, June Hee’s A Match Made in Heaven.

His European debut came in 2011 with the Bucharest National Opera in Romania, marking the start of his international career. From 2013 onward, Lee established himself as a leading tenor in Europe and beyond. In the 2013/14 season, he sang Arrigo in I Vespri Siciliani at Theater Freiburg, Germany, Calaf in Turandot at Graz Opera, Austria, and Radamès in Aida at Opernfestspiele St. Margarethen, Austria. His repertoire expanded in subsequent years with roles like Don José in Carmen, Manrico in Il Trovatore, and Riccardo in Un ballo in maschera at theaters such as Theater Freiburg and Saarländisches Staatstheater Saarbrücken (2014/15). He also performed Radamès in Aida at the Cairo Opera House, Egypt, and Calaf in Turandot at Teatr Wielki w Łódź, Poland, under conductor Antoni Wit (2015/16).

Lee’s career continued to flourish with frequent performances of Turandot (Calaf) and Aida (Radamès) across venues like Tbilisi Opera and Ballet State Theater, Georgia (2016/17), National Theatre Prague, Czech Republic (2017/18), and Theater Dortmund, Germany (2018/19). He debuted as Samson in Samson et Dalila at Teatr Wielki w Łódź (2018/19) and Pinkerton in Madama Butterfly at Theater Dortmund (2019/20). Other notable roles include Mario Cavaradossi in Tosca at Teatro di San Carlo, Italy (2019/20. Among his performances as Radamès in Aida, he sang at the Hatshepsut Temple during the Luxor Festival in Egypt (2019/20).

In recent years, Lee has taken on diverse roles, including Dick Johnson in La Fanciulla del West at Opera Hedeland, Denmark, Theater Hagen, Germany (2023/24), and debuted as Paul in Die tote Stadt at Korea National Opera (2023/24), expanding his German repertoire. In the 2023/24 season, he performed the title role in the Italian five-act version of Don Carlo at the Latvian National Opera in Riga, where he also sang Radamès in Aida and Calaf in Turandot. In the summer of 2024, he debuted as Des Grieux in Manon Lescaut at the Saaremaa Festival in Estonia. Later in 2024, he performed Calaf in Turandot at the Macedonian National Theatre in Skopje, North Macedonia, and sang in Beethoven’s 9th Symphony in Auerbach, Germany. Recently, he stepped in to perform Turandot successfully at Theater Magdeburg, Germany, on March 1, 2025. As of March 12, 2025, his upcoming engagements include Radamès in Aida at the Macedonian National Theatre, Skopje, Calaf in Turandot at Opera på Skäret, Sweden, during the 2025 summer festival, and Giuseppe Verdi’s Messa da Requiem with Oratorienchor Würzburg, Germany.

== Awards ==
- 2012: First Prize at the International Singing Competition Masters of Lyrical Art – Valentin Teodorian in Bucharest, Romania
- 2013: First Prize and Special Prize at the Competizione dell'Opera in Linz, Austria

== Artistry and Reception ==
Lee is recognized for his lyrical tone and commanding high register, qualities that have earned him praise from audiences and critics alike. His rendition of “Nessun dorma” from Turandot has been particularly acclaimed, often eliciting strong responses during live performances.

== Reviews ==
James Lee has received consistent praise for his performances across various productions:

- La Fanciulla del West, Opera Hedeland, 2024: In his portrayal of Dick Johnson/Ramerrez, Lee was noted for bringing authority and versatility to the role, mastering dramatic intensity and bel canto finesse. Critics highlighted his contribution to the central trio, describing it as essential to the opera’s success (Berlingske).
- Die tote Stadt, Korea National Opera, 2024: Singing Paul in a rare German role, Lee impressed with his stamina and textual clarity, despite his Italian-trained voice. Reviewers suggested his debut in this role at Seoul Arts Center could position him as a future standout interpreter (Onlinemerker.com).
- Gala Puccini 100, Daegu Opera House & Bucharest Opera Festival, 2024: Lee’s spinto tenor qualities shone in arias like “Nessun dorma,” “Donna non vidi mai,” and “E lucevan le stelle,” with critics praising his dramatic phrasing, robust sound, and powerful high notes, particularly the climactic “Vincerò” that electrified the audience (Adevarul.ro).
- Tosca, Theater Dortmund, 2022: As Cavaradossi, Lee was lauded for his rich, sensual tenor voice, radiant high notes, and emotional depth. His arias “Recondita armonia” and “E lucevan le stelle” garnered enthusiastic responses, with reviewers noting his chemistry with soprano Inga Kalna and his standout presence in the production (Ruhr Nachrichten, OMM.de, Ruhrbuehnen.de).
