= James Zhongzi Lee =

James Zhongzi Lee (Chinese: 李中子; born June 1955 in Jiangsu, China) is a Chinese business magnate, investor and real estate developer. Lee is the Chairman/CEO of Lee World Group, a conglomerate involving real estate, investment, sourcing, manufacturing, property management, general aviation and education.

He was one of the earliest group of mainland Chinese scholars to move to the United States. He is fluent in English and Mandarin.

== Early life ==
In 1976, Lee graduated from Wuhan University in China, then he briefly worked for the Foreign Affairs Office. He went on to get his Masters at Communication University of China; after graduation he entered the broadcast television industry. Afterwards, he went to the United States and completed his Ph.D in Political Science in Ohio State University.

In 1993, Lee started his business with ten thousand dollars and quickly got into the manufacturing and trading business. In just a few years, he had become the nation's largest therapy ball exporter and trader.

Then, Lee World began to manufacture OEM rubber and metal auto parts for General Motors, Ford and Chrysler Fiat. Lee went to Harvard Business School OPM program in 2000 to further his business studies.

== Lee World Holdings ==
Lee World Group is a business involving manufacturing, international trade, investment, mergers and acquisitions, real estate, general aviation, and education into one integrated group in with locations in New York, Beijing, Shanghai, Wuhan, Huailai, Ürümqi, Vientiane, Cincinnati and Vienna, totalling over 20 wholly owned companies, joint ventures and joint stock companies.

Moreover, in nearly 30 years of the Sino-US economic and trade, Lee also acted as a bridge for cultural exchange, for which he was awarded the Peace Development Award. Dr. Lee donated one million RMB to the China Friendship Peace and Development Foundation. The donation was used to produce a 45-minute-long documentary titled “Touching The Tigers”.

=== Real estate developments ===
In 2009, he acquired and developed Chateau Lafite: the project is located approximately 15 kilometers west of the Badaling Great Wall, north of Beijing, and it covers an area of 220 acres, total buildable 10 million ft^{2}. Its purpose is for the high-end leisure, vacation, health villas, and presented a total investment of 5 billion yuan; the Chateau Lafite complex includes single-family, townhouse, apartment buildings, retail space, and 5 star hotels.

In 2014, Lee World Real Estate began the construction of 300,000 m^{2} commercial complex and hotel project in Vientiane, Laos.

Future projects are aiming for the New York metro area and Europe.

=== Lee World Aviation ===
On August 16, 2014, Lee held a ceremony to unveil China's First Fly-in Community in Northern Beijing; comedian Song Dan Dan, a friend of Lee, was there to promote the event. On May 16, 2015, Lee World Aviation successfully held the first event in China focused on Fly-in Community Event with the name “China Dream, Winter Olympic Dream, General Aviation Dream.”

== Time line ==
1993 Established Lee World Industries, LLC;
1998 Became largest U.S. distributors of therapy balls;
1999 to Present: GM, Ford, Chrysler, Tata, and other leading automotive company’s supplier;
1999 Founded Lee World Beijing;
2003 Acquisition of Wuhan Factory;
2004 Founded Lee World Shanghai;
2006 Invested in six companies in China in coal mine, technology, security firm, and real estate;
2009 Develop ten million square ft. of mixed used, residential, commercial, retail and hotel real estate project;
2012 Founded Lee World Holdings;
2013 Founded Lee World Shanghai Auto Parts Co., Ltd.;
2013 Founded New York LW Realty Group Co., Ltd.;
2014 Founded Lee World General Aviation Co., Ltd.;
2015 Founded Lee World Airport Construction Co., Ltd.;

== Award and honors ==
- In 2011, Elected on the University Board of Communication University of China.
- Formed China Philippines Business Association (CPBA) with President Aquino and Ambassador Joey Antonio.
- Received the Peace Development Award from Chinese Peoples Association.
- In 2013, Lee World Group to undertake the world's largest bronze statue of Jesus Christ in Puerto Rico.
- In 2014, Wrote Autobiography ISBN 9787503953958
- In 2015, Awarded Visiting Professor of Wuhan University and his own scholarship.
- Awarded as advisor of MBA College of the Communication University of China.

== Personal life ==
In 1983, Lee married Luo Lige (Lisa Luo), a Chinese actress. Their daughter Jamie and Son James Jr. were born in 1989 and 1992. Lee is an avid golf player.
