= James Edgar Lee =

American politician (1900–1966)

James Edgar Lee (January 27, 1900 - January 1966) was a state legislator in Mississippi. He represented his hometown of Prentiss, Mississippi and served in the Mississippi Senate. He was president of the Citizens Council of Jefferson Davis County.

Lee studied at Mississippi College and Millsaps College. He was a private in World War I. He was elected to the Mississippi House of Representatives in 1923.
