= USS Kearsarge (1861) =

Sloops-of-war of the United States Navy

Coordinates: 13°32′N 80°03′W

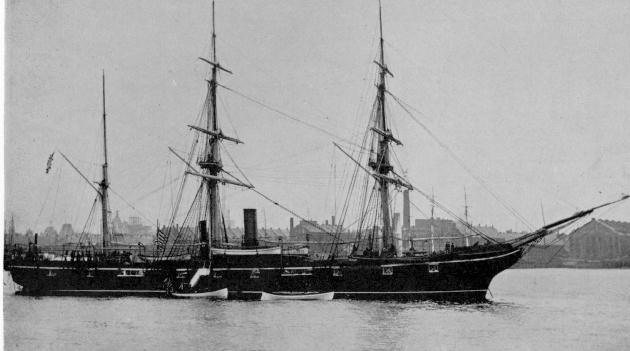

History
- Name: USS Kearsarge
- Namesake: Mount Kearsarge, later ones are named in honor of her.
- Ordered: 1861
- Builder: Portsmouth Navy Yard, Kittery, Maine
- Laid down: 1861
- Launched: 11 September 1861
- Commissioned: 24 January 1862
- Decommissioned: 26 November 1864
- Recommissioned: 1 April 1865
- Decommissioned: 14 August 1866
- Recommissioned: 16 January 1868
- Decommissioned: 11 October 1870
- Recommissioned: 8 December 1873
- Decommissioned: 15 January 1878
- Recommissioned: 15 May 1879
- Decommissioned: 1 December 1886
- Recommissioned: 2 November 1888
- Stricken: 1894
- Fate: Wrecked, 2 February 1894

General characteristics
- Type: Sloop-of-war
- Displacement: 1,550 long tons (1,575 t)
- Length: 201 ft 3 in (61.34 m)
- Beam: 33 ft 8 in (10.26 m)
- Draft: 14 ft 3 in (4.34 m)
- Propulsion: Steam engine/Sails
- Speed: 11 kn (13 mph; 20 km/h)
- Armament: 2 × 11 in (280 mm) smoothbore Dahlgren guns, 4 × 32-pounder guns, 1 × 30-pounder Parrott rifle

USS Kearsarge, a Mohican-class screw sloop, is best known for her defeat of the Confederate commerce raider CSS Alabama off Cherbourg, France during the American Civil War.

== Hunting Confederate raiders ==
Kearsarge was built at Portsmouth Navy Yard in Kittery, Maine, under the 1861 American Civil War emergency shipbuilding program. The new 1,550-long-ton (1,570 t) steam sloop-of-war was launched on 11 September 1861; she was sponsored by Mrs. McFarland, the wife of the editor of the Concord Statement, and was commissioned on 24 January 1862, with Captain Charles W. Pickering in command. Soon after, she was hunting for Confederate raiders in European waters.

Kearsarge was the only ship of the United States Navy named for Mount Kearsarge in New Hampshire. Subsequent ships were later named Kearsarge in honor of the ship.

Kearsarge departed Portsmouth, New Hampshire on 5 February 1862 for the coast of Spain. She then sailed to Gibraltar to join the blockade of Confederate raider CSS Sumter, forcing the ship's abandonment there in December 1862. However, Sumter's captain, Raphael Semmes, having returned to England for reassignment, was soon recommissioning off the Azores, in international waters, the newly-built British sloop Enrica as CSS Alabama. From there, Alabama went on to become one of the most successful commerce raiders in naval history.

From Cádiz in November of 1862 until March 1863, Kearsarge prepared for her engagement with Alabama. She searched for the raider, ranging along the coast of Northern Europe all the way to the Canaries, Madeira, and the Outer Hebrides. In early May 1864, she ran aground near Oostende. She was then repaired in the dry dock of Vlissingen, Netherlands until 10 May. On 14 June 1864, Kearsarge arrived at Cherbourg and found Alabama in port. The raider had returned there for much needed repairs after a very long, multiple ocean cruise at the expense of 65 Union merchant ships. Kearsarge took up station at the harbor's entrance to await Semmes' next move.

== Battle of Cherbourg ==
On 19 June, Alabama stood out of Cherbourg Harbor for her last action. Mindful of French neutrality, Kearsarge's new commanding officer, Capt. John A. Winslow, took the sloop-of-war clear of territorial waters, then turned to meet the Confederate cruiser.

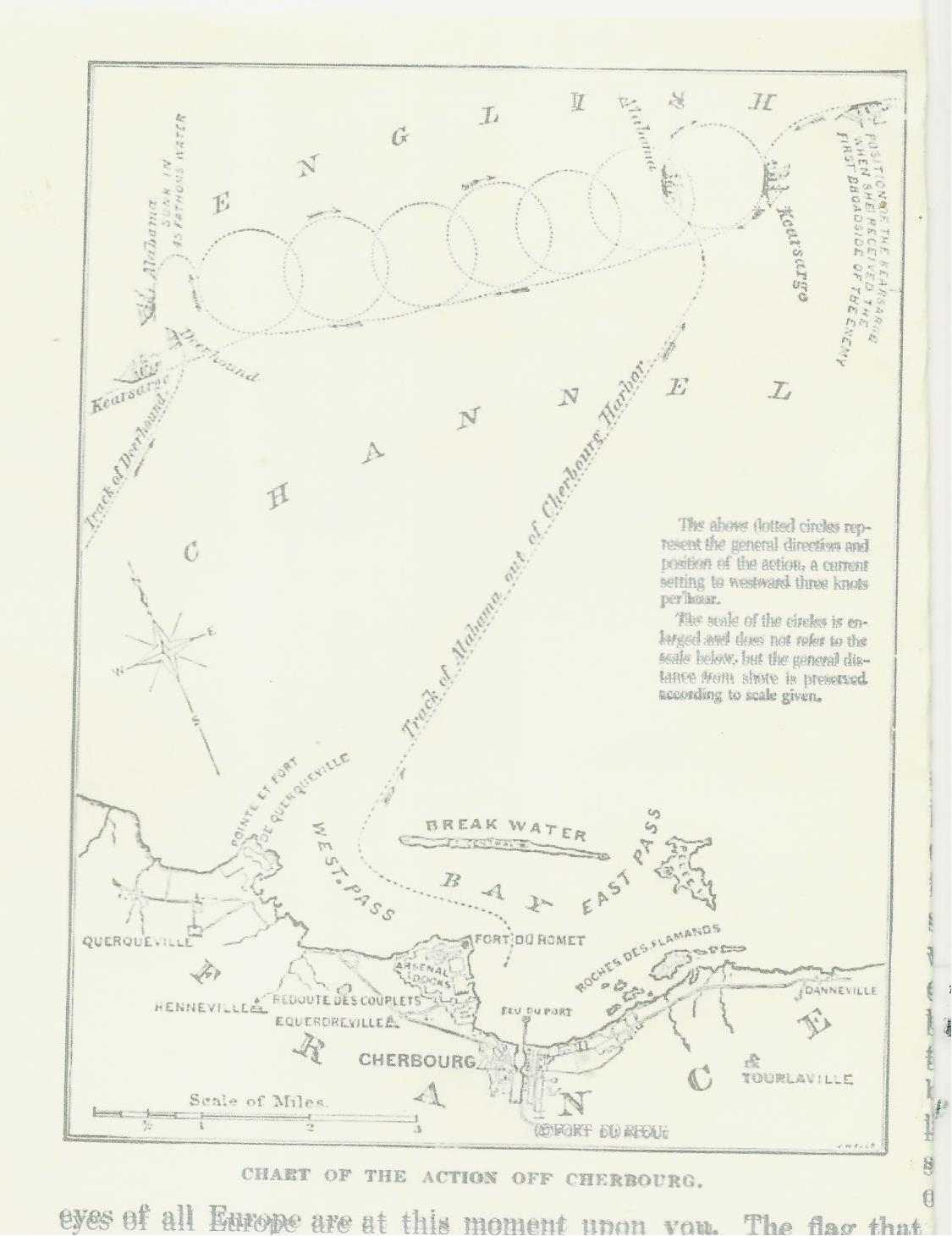
Chart of Battle Between the CSS Alabama and the USS Kearsarge 1864

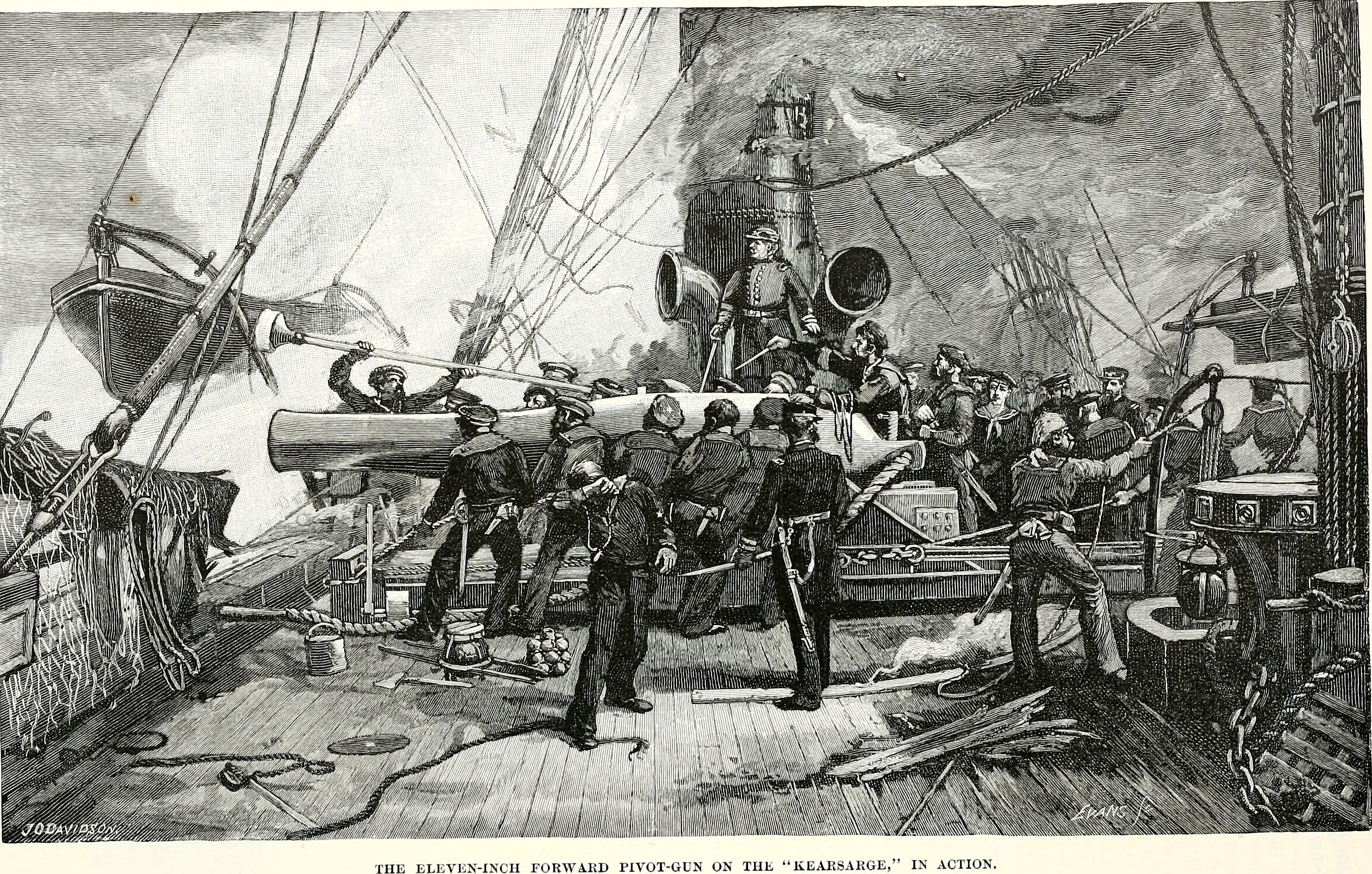
Firing the forward 11-inch gun on Kearsarge

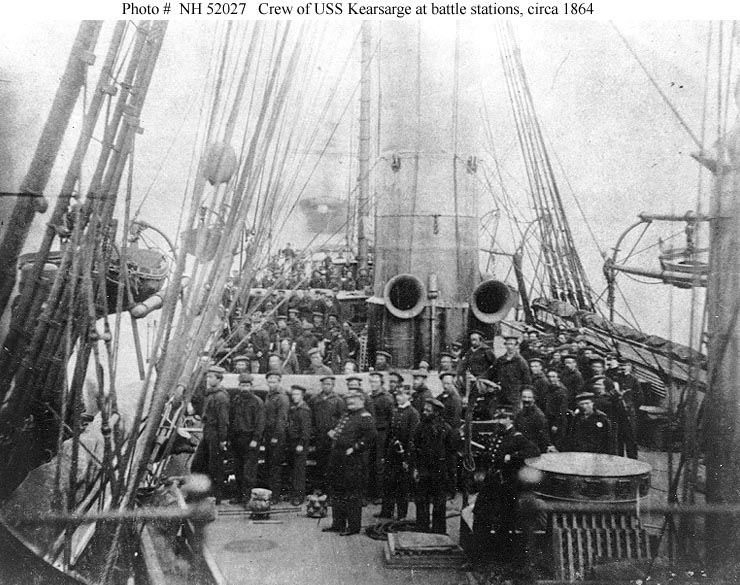
Crew of USS Kearsarge in 1864 after the battle; showing both 11-inch guns pointed to starboard as they were during the battle

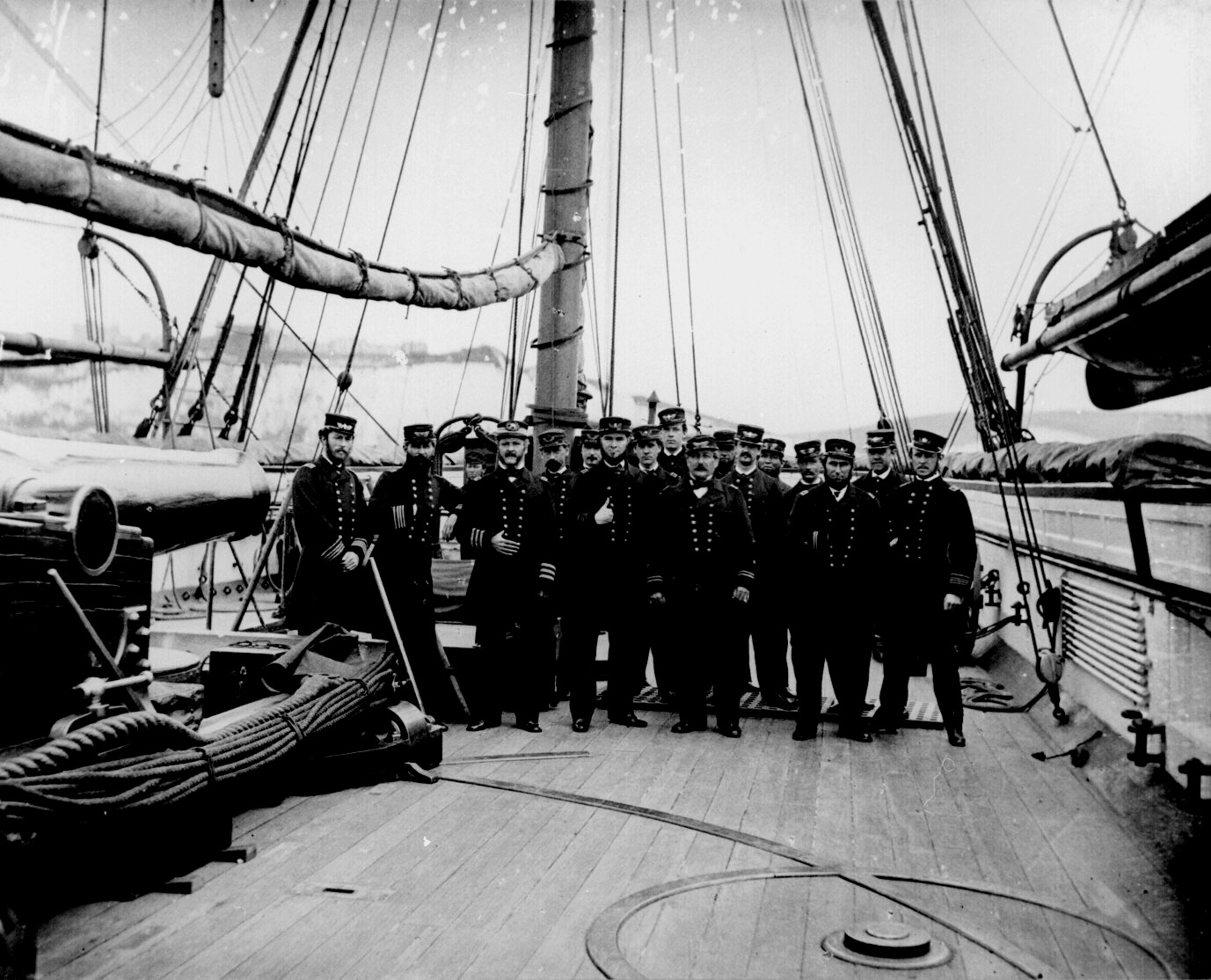
A photo of naval officers on board Kearsarge, including Captain John A. Winslow (foreground, third from the left), shortly after the sinking of CSS Alabama.

Alabama was the first to open fire, while Kearsarge held her reply until she had closed to less than 1,000 yd (910 m). Steaming on opposite courses, the ships moved in seven spiraling circles on a southwesterly course, as each commander tried to cross his opponent's bow to deliver deadly raking fire. The battle quickly turned against Alabama, due to her poor gunnery and to the quality of her long-stored (and deteriorated) powder, fuses, and shells. Unknown at the time to Captain Semmes aboard the Confederate raider, Kearsarge had been given added protection for her vital machinery, by chain cable, mounted in three separate vertical tiers, along the port and starboard of her midsection.

This hull armor had been installed more than a year before (in just three days), while Kearsarge was in port at the Azores. It was made using 720 ft (220 m) of 1.7 in (43 mm) single-link iron chain, and covered hull spaces 49 ft 6 in (15.09 m) long by 6 ft 2 in (1.88 m) deep. This was stopped up and down in three layers to eye-bolts with marlines, and secured by iron dogs, then concealed behind 1 in (25 mm) deal-boards, painted black to match the upper hull's color. This chain cladding was placed along Kearsarge's port and starboard midsection down to her waterline, for protection of her engines and boilers, when the upper portions of the cruiser's coal bunkers were empty. This armor belt was hit twice during the fight: first, in the starboard gangway by one of Alabama's 32-pounder shells, which cut the chain armor, denting the hull planking underneath, and by a second shell of the same warhead-rating exploded, breaking a link of the chain, and tearing away a portion of the deal-board covering. Even if the shells had been delivered by Alabama's more powerful 100-pounder Blakely pivot rifle, the impacts were more than 5 ft (1.5 m) above the waterline and would therefore have missed her vital machinery.

One hour after she fired her first salvo, Alabama had been reduced to a sinking wreck by Kearsarge's more accurate gunnery, and by its powerful 11 in (280 mm) Dahlgren smoothbore pivot guns. Alabama went down by the stern shortly after Semmes struck his colors, threw his sword into the sea to avoid its capture, and sent one of his two remaining longboats to Kearsarge with a message of surrender, and a rescue appeal for his surviving crew. Kearsarge finally sent ship's boats for the majority of Alabama's survivors, but Semmes and 41 others were instead rescued by the nearby British yacht Deerhound, and escaped to the United Kingdom.

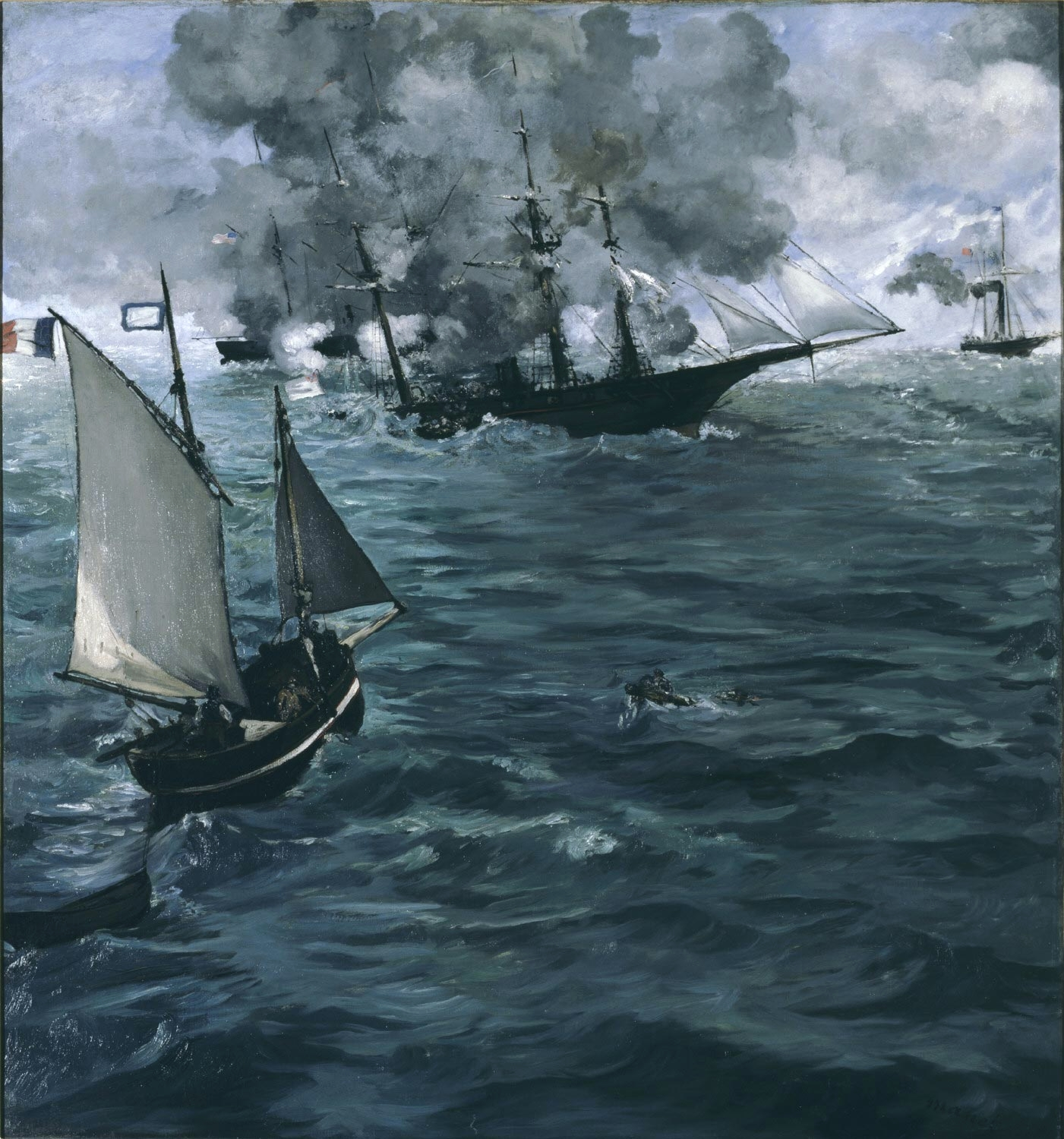
The Battle of the Kearsarge and the Alabama, by Édouard Manet, 1864

The battle between Kearsarge and Alabama is commemorated by the United States Navy with a battle star on the Civil War campaign streamer. In addition, 17 of Kearsarge's crew received the Medal of Honor for valor during this action:

- Michael Aheam
- John F. Bickford
- William S. Bond
- James Haley
- Mark G. Ham
- George H. Harrison
- John Hayes
- James H. Lee
- Charles Moore
- Joachim Pease
- Thomas Perry
- William B. Poole
- Charles A. Read
- George E. Read
- James Saunders
- William Smith
- Robert Strahan

The medals were awarded on 31 December 1864.

== Home for repairs ==
Kearsarge then sailed along the French coast in an unsuccessful search for the commerce raider CSS Florida, then proceeded to the Caribbean before turning northward for Boston, Massachusetts, where she was decommissioned for repairs on 26 November. She was recommissioned four months later on 1 April 1865 and sailed for the coast of Spain on 14 April in an attempt to intercept CSS Stonewall. The Confederate ram eluded Federal warships and surrendered to Spanish authorities at Havana, Cuba on 19 May. After cruising the Mediterranean Sea and the English Channel south to Monrovia, Liberia, Kearsarge was decommissioned on 14 August 1866 in the Boston Navy Yard.

== Post-war service ==
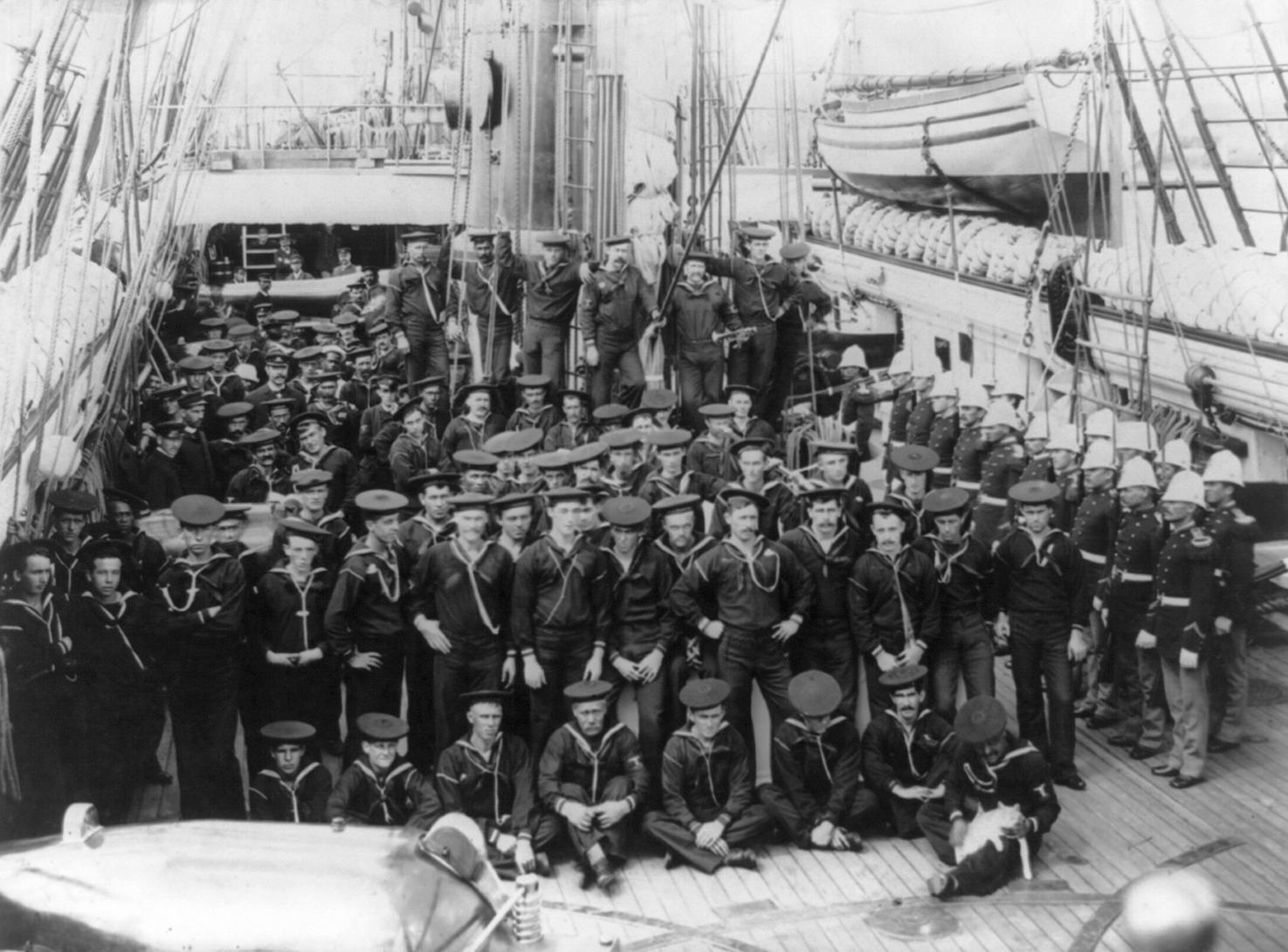
A post Civil War photograph of USS Kearsarge; the uniforms of the Marine ship's guard at right point to the period 1892-1904

Kearsarge was recommissioned on 16 January 1868 and sailed on 12 February to serve in the South Pacific, operating out of Valparaíso, Chile. On 22 August, she landed provisions for destitute earthquake victims in Peru. She continued to watch over American commercial interests along the coast of South America until 17 April 1869. Then she sailed to watch over American interests among the Marquesas, Society Islands, Navigators Islands, and Fiji Islands. She also called at ports in New South Wales and New Zealand before returning to Callao, Peru on 31 October. She resumed duties on the South Pacific Station until 21 July 1870, then cruised to the Hawaiian Islands before being decommissioned in the Mare Island Navy Yard on 11 October 1870.

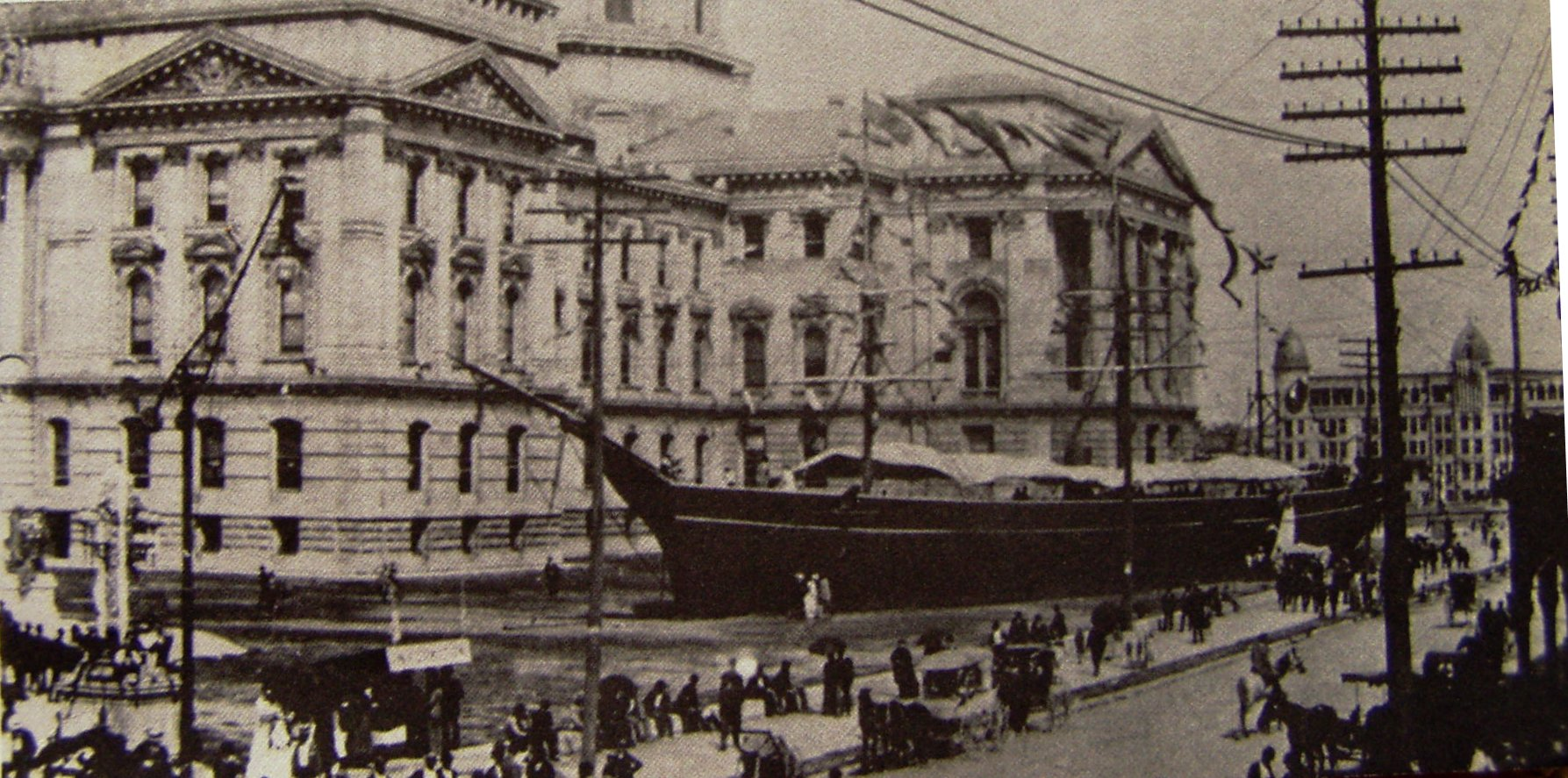
A replica of Kearsarge was on display at the 1893 GAR National Convention in Indianapolis, Indiana

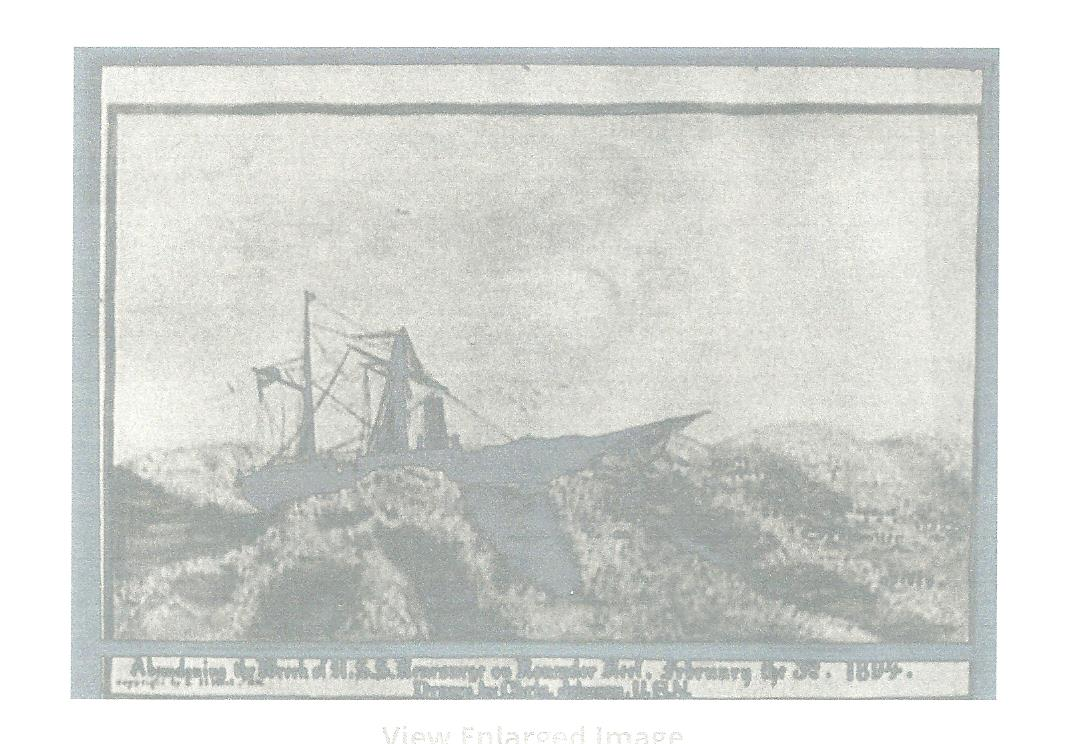
Abandoning the wreck of the U.S.S. Kearsarge on Roncador Reef, February 3rd, 1894

Kearsarge was recommissioned on 8 December 1873 and departed on 4 March 1874 for Yokohama, Japan, arriving there on 11 May. She cruised on Asiatic Station for three years, protecting American citizens and commerce in China, Japan, and the Philippines. From 4 September to 13 December, she carried Professor Asaph Hall's scientific party from Nagasaki, Japan, to Vladivostok, Russia, to observe the transit of Venus. She departed Nagasaki on 3 September 1877, and via the Suez Canal, she visited Mediterranean ports before returning to Boston on 30 December. She was decommissioned at Portsmouth, New Hampshire on 15 January 1878.

Kearsarge was recommissioned on 15 May 1879 for four years of duty in the North Atlantic ranging from Newfoundland to the Caribbean Sea and the coast of Panama. The warship took part in dedication ceremonies for the Brooklyn Bridge on 24 May 1883. She departed New York on 21 August 1883 to cruise for three years in the Mediterranean, then Northern European waters, and finally along the west coast of Africa. She returned to Portsmouth on 12 November and was decommissioned in the Portsmouth Navy Yard on 1 December 1886.

== Wreck ==
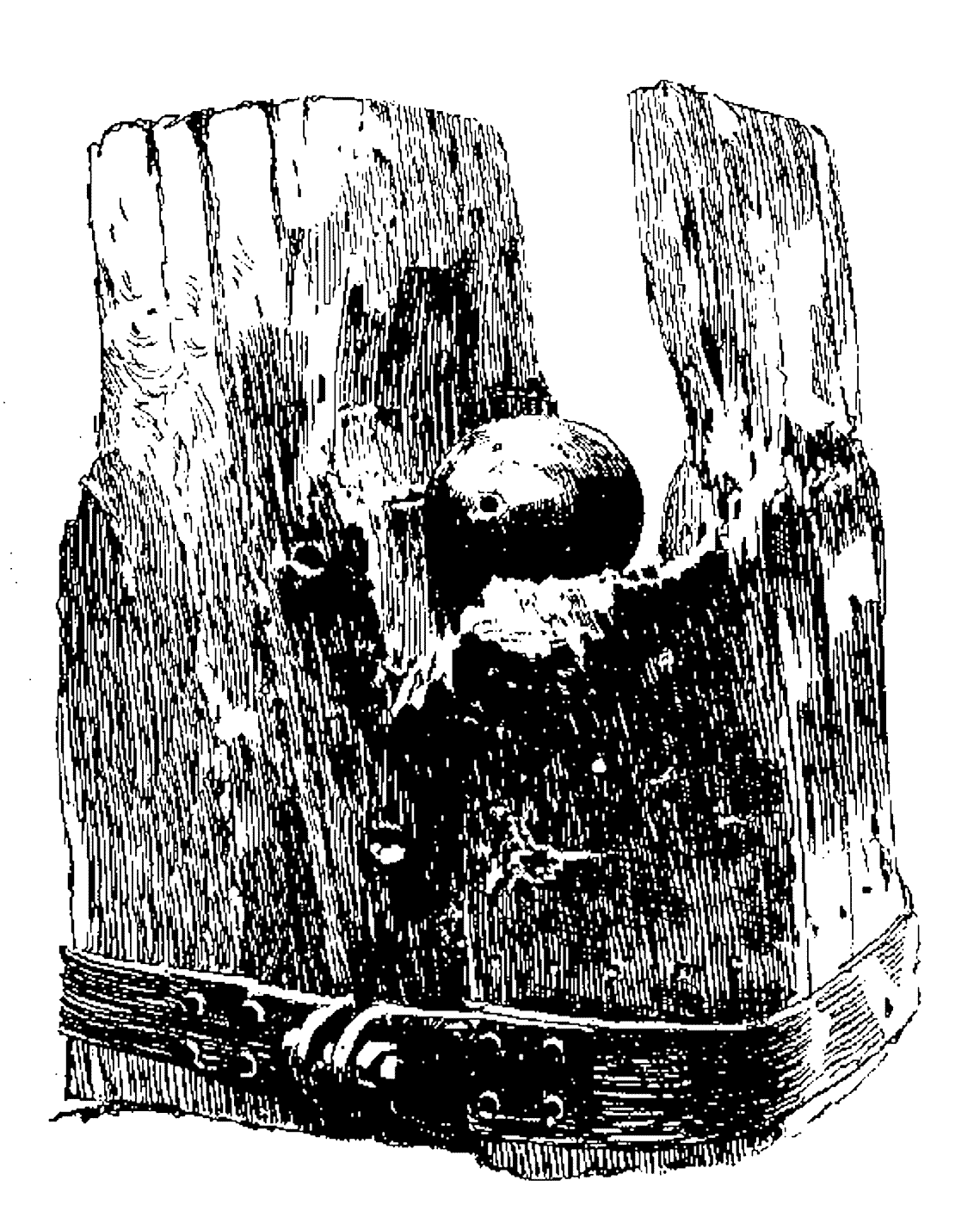
The sternpost of USS Kearsarge, with a 100-pound round embedded within it.

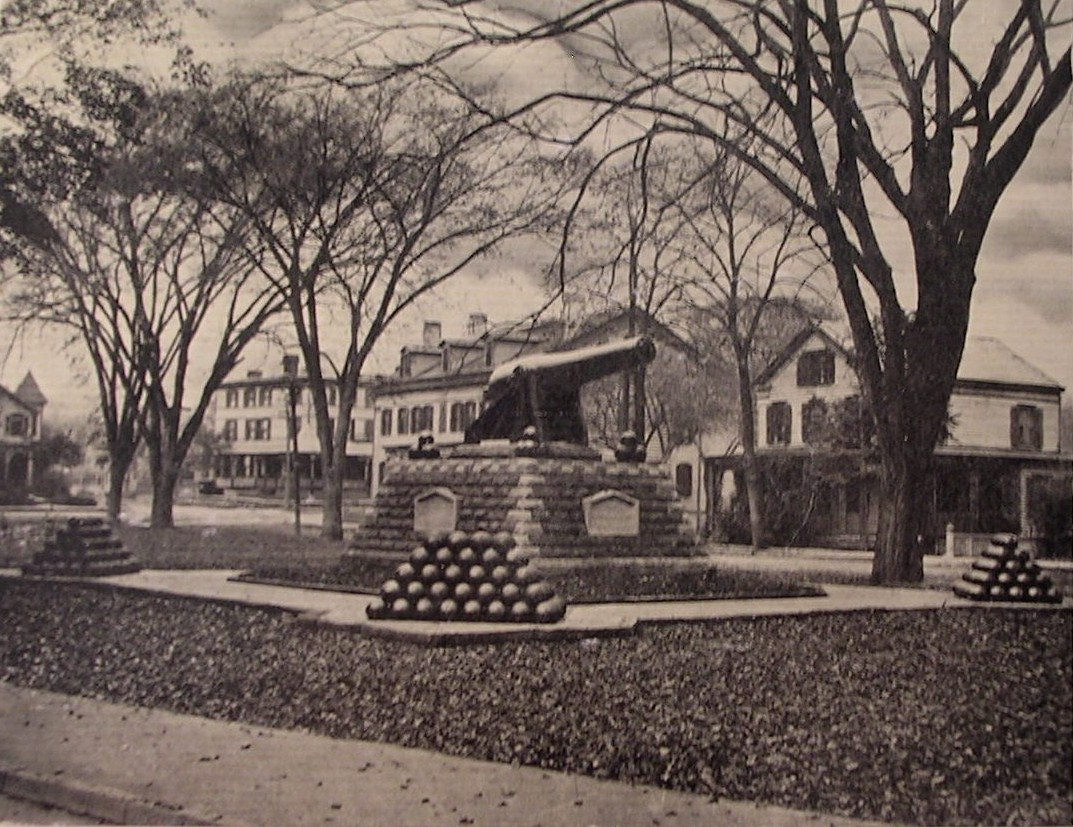
A cannon from Kearsarge stood in West Park in Stamford, Connecticut from Memorial Day, 1901 until 1942, when it was hauled away as scrap metal during World War II. Cast at West Point in 1827, it had also been used on USS Lancaster.

Kearsarge was recommissioned on 2 November 1888 and largely spent her remaining years protecting American interests in the West Indies, off Venezuela, and along the Central Americas. In October 1889 she carried famed abolitionist Frederick Douglass to Haiti, where Douglass was to be minister and consul general. On President Harrison's orders, she sailed to Navassa Island in 1891 to investigate labor conditions there. She departed Haiti on 20 January 1894 for Bluefields, Nicaragua, but she wrecked on a reef off Roncador Cay on 2 February. Her officers and crew made it safely ashore.

Congress appropriated $45,000 to tow Kearsarge home, but a salvage team of the Boston Towboat Company found that she could not be refloated. Some artifacts were saved from the ship, including the ship's Bible. The salvaged items, along with a damaged section of her stern post with an unexploded shell from CSS Alabama still embedded in it, are now stored or on display at the Washington Navy Yard. According to the US Naval Academy Museum, after the battle with Alabama the shell was removed and the stern post was replaced. Kearsarge was struck from the Naval Vessel Register in 1894.

== Popular culture ==
Liverpool writer Jimmy McGovern's 2007 play, King Cotton, culminates with the battle between Kearsarge and Alabama. It premiered at The Lowry.

Clive Cussler, an American adventure novelist and marine archaeologist, wrote the 2001 novel Valhalla Rising, in which Kearsarge is attacked by a submerged vessel and run aground, causing her wreck.

Harry Turtledove, American alternate history novelist, wrote the 1992 novel The Guns of the South in which time-traveling South African white nationalists successfully re-arm the Confederate States Army with AK-47 assault rifles in early 1864, thus enabling the Confederacy to rout Union forces in every land campaign of the year. When Washington is captured by the Army of Northern Virginia, Abraham Lincoln reluctantly concedes the Confederacy's independence. The war is implied to end in mid-June, as USS Kearsarge is mentioned as having been waiting for CSS Alabama to emerge from the French port city of Cherbourg when word of the war's end reached Europe. In this alternate scenario, the USS Kearsarge never met the CSS Alabama in battle. Instead, each warship sailed for its home country.

The Kearsarge’s fight with the Alabama in the Battle of Cherbourg (1864) is recounted in the sea shanty Roll Alabama Roll.

== See also ==
- New Hampshire Historical Marker No. 243: Mount Kearsarge and the U.S.S. Kearsarge
