= Melbourne General Cemetery =

Cemetery in Melbourne, Australia

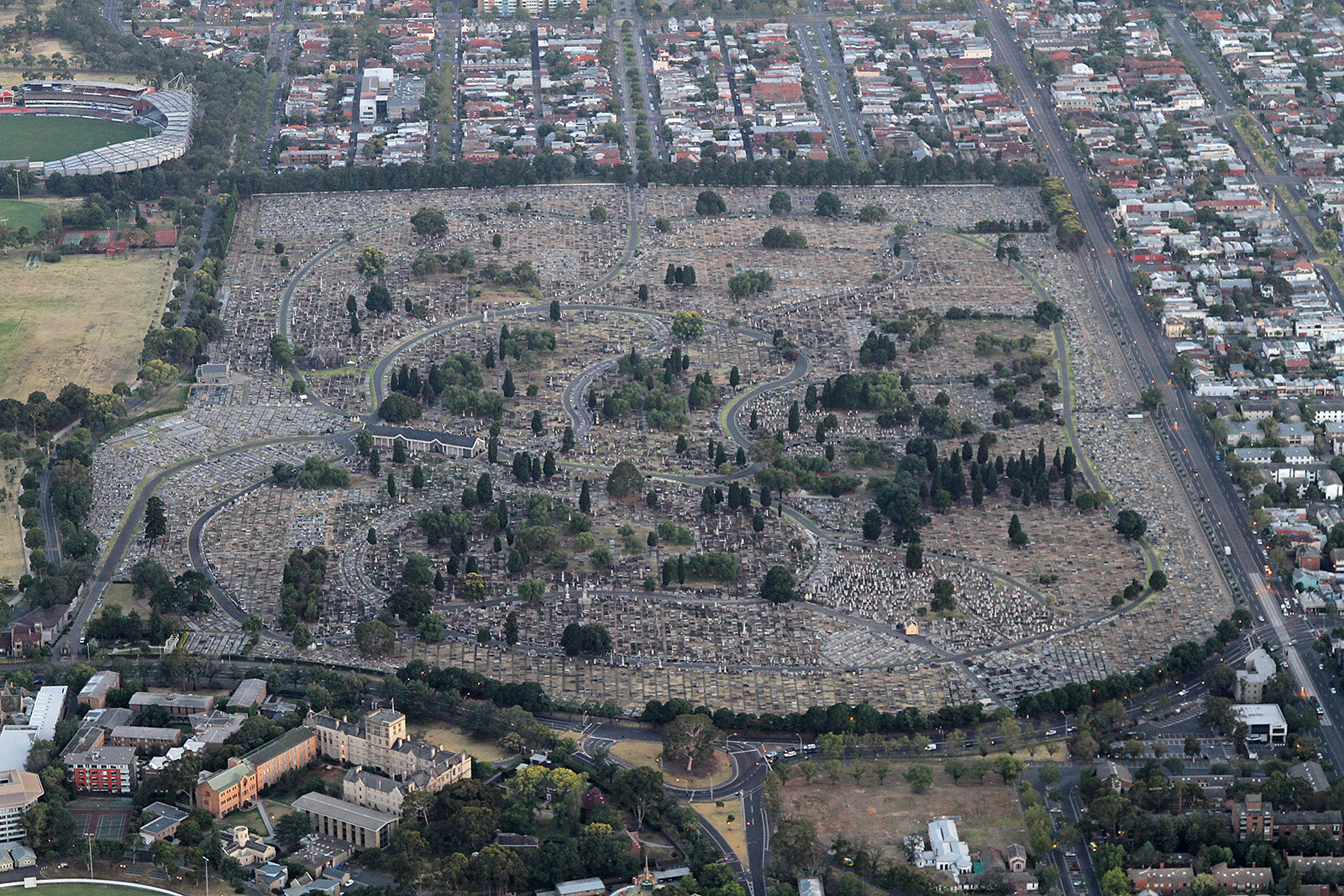
- Aerial view of Melbourne General Cemetery, looking north
- Interactive map of Melbourne General Cemetery

Details
- Established: 1852
- Location: Carlton North, Victoria
- Country: Australia
- Coordinates: 37°47′20″S 144°57′55″E
- Size: 43 hectares (110 acres)
- Website: smct.org.au/our-locations/about-melbourne-general-cemetery

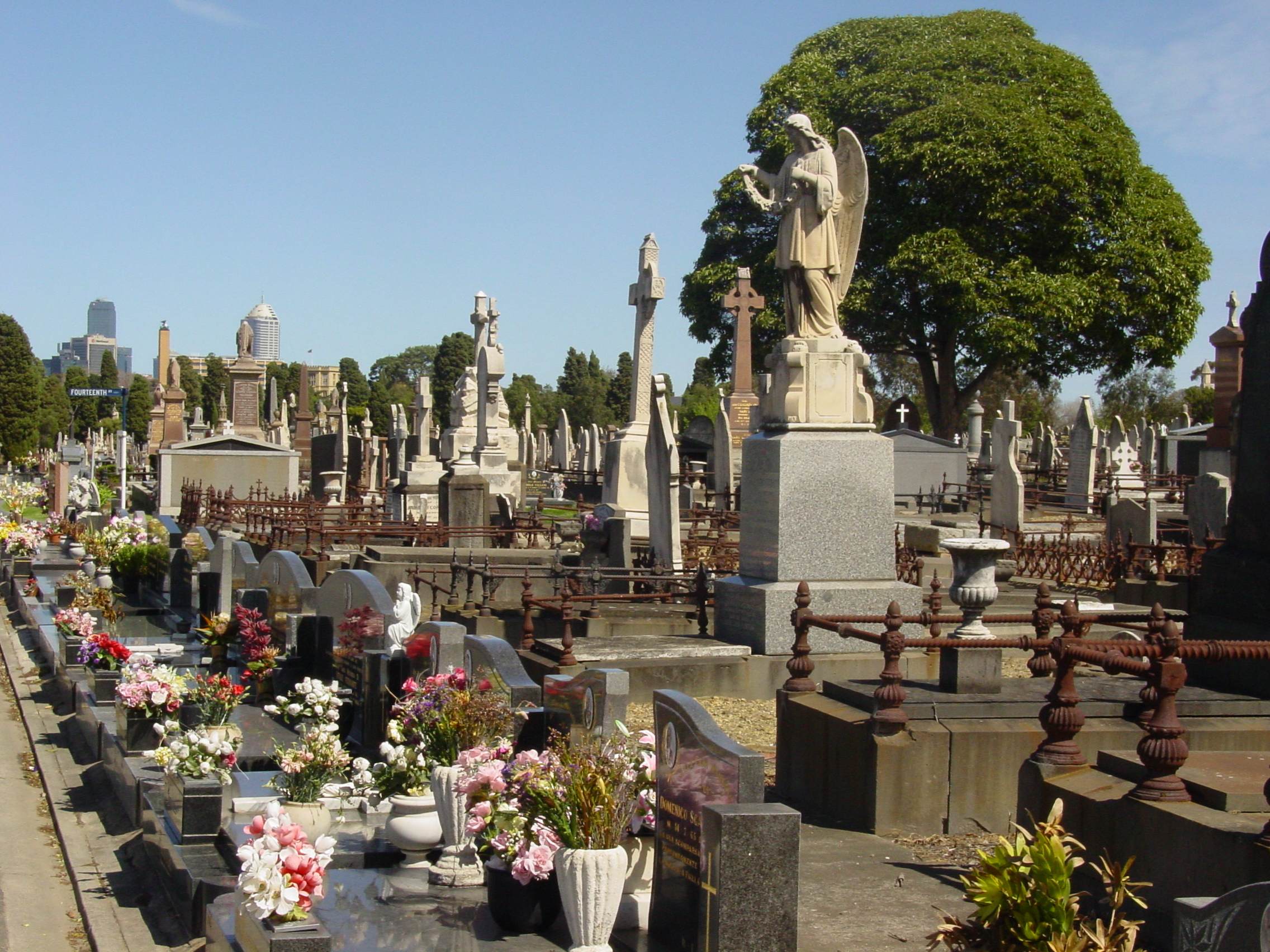
Characteristic headstones and grave sites within the cemetery

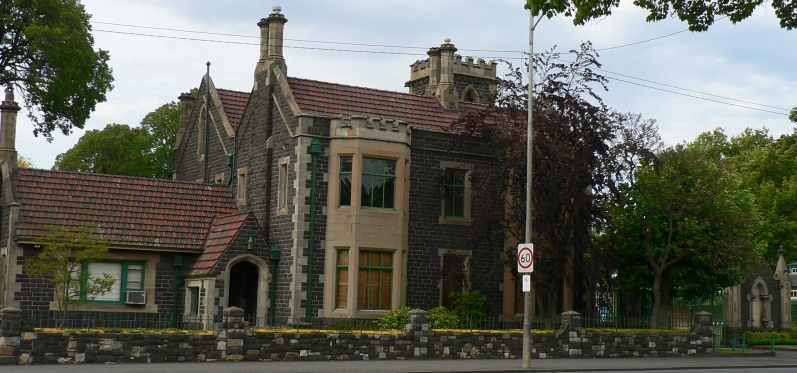
Cemetery gatehouse

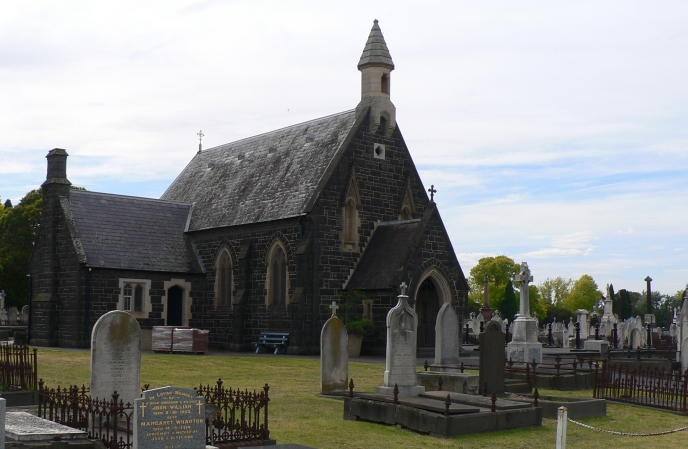
Chapel

The Melbourne General Cemetery is a large (43 hectare) necropolis located 3 km (1.9 mi) north of the city of Melbourne in the suburb of Carlton North.

The cemetery is notably the resting place of five Prime Ministers of Australia, more than any other necropolis within Australia. Former Prime Minister Harold Holt's headstone is a memorial, as his remains have never been discovered.

== History ==
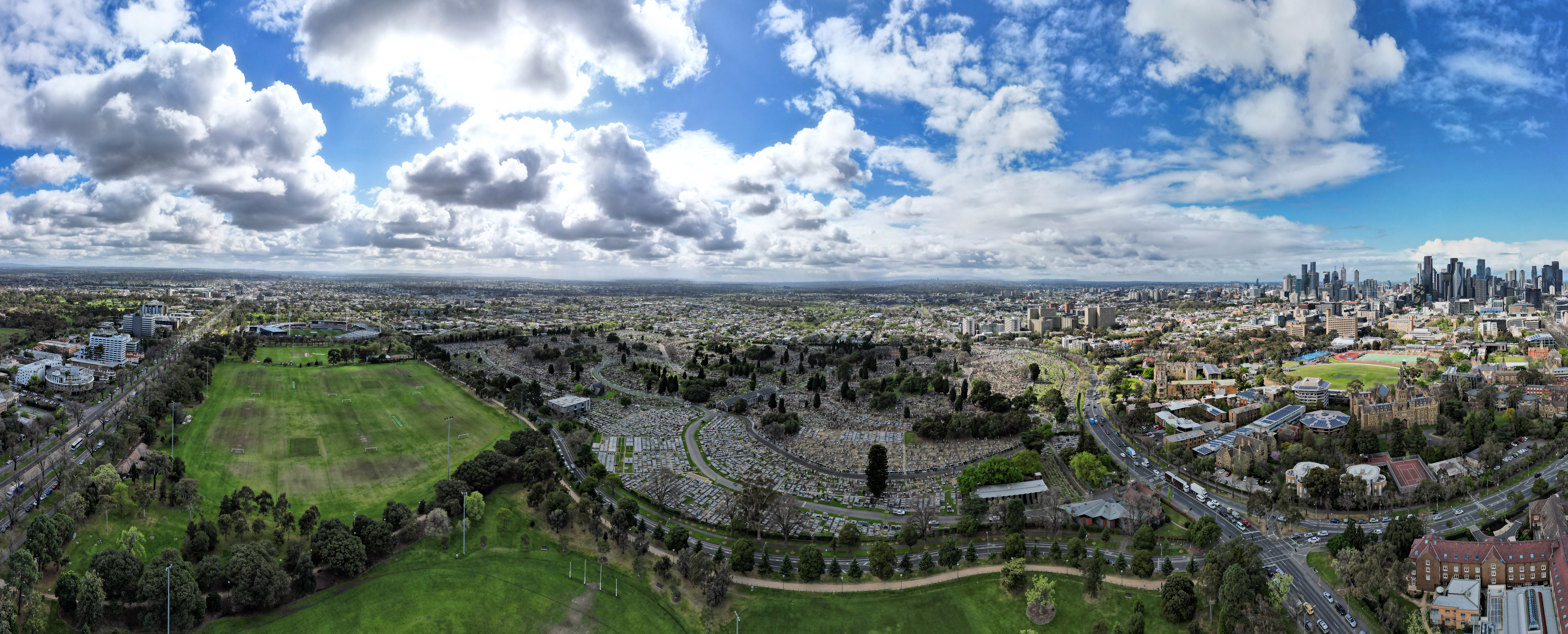
Aerial panorama of Melbourne General Cemetery in Carlton, September 2023

The cemetery was established in 1852 and opened on 1 June 1853, and the Old Melbourne Cemetery (on the site of what is now the Queen Victoria Market) was closed the next year.

The grounds feature several heritage buildings, many in bluestone, including a couple of chapels and a number of cast iron pavilions. The gatehouses are particularly notable.

Gatehouse Mausoleum, designed by architect Philip Harmer, was constructed at the cemetery in 2004.

== Notable interments ==
=== Prime Ministers Garden ===
Six Prime Ministers of Australia are memorialised at Melbourne General Cemetery. Four are interred in the cemetery's 'Prime Ministers Garden': Sir Robert Menzies (including Dame Pattie Menzies), Sir John Gorton, Malcolm Fraser and Bob Hawke (half of Hawkes ashes are at Melbourne, the other half are interred in Sydney). Harold Holt's (including his wife Dame Zara Bate) is a memorial, as his body was never recovered after he disappeared at sea. Dame Zara is buried at Sorrento Cemetery, the closest burial ground to where Holt disappeared.

James Scullin (including Sarah Scullin) is buried in the Catholic section of the cemetery.

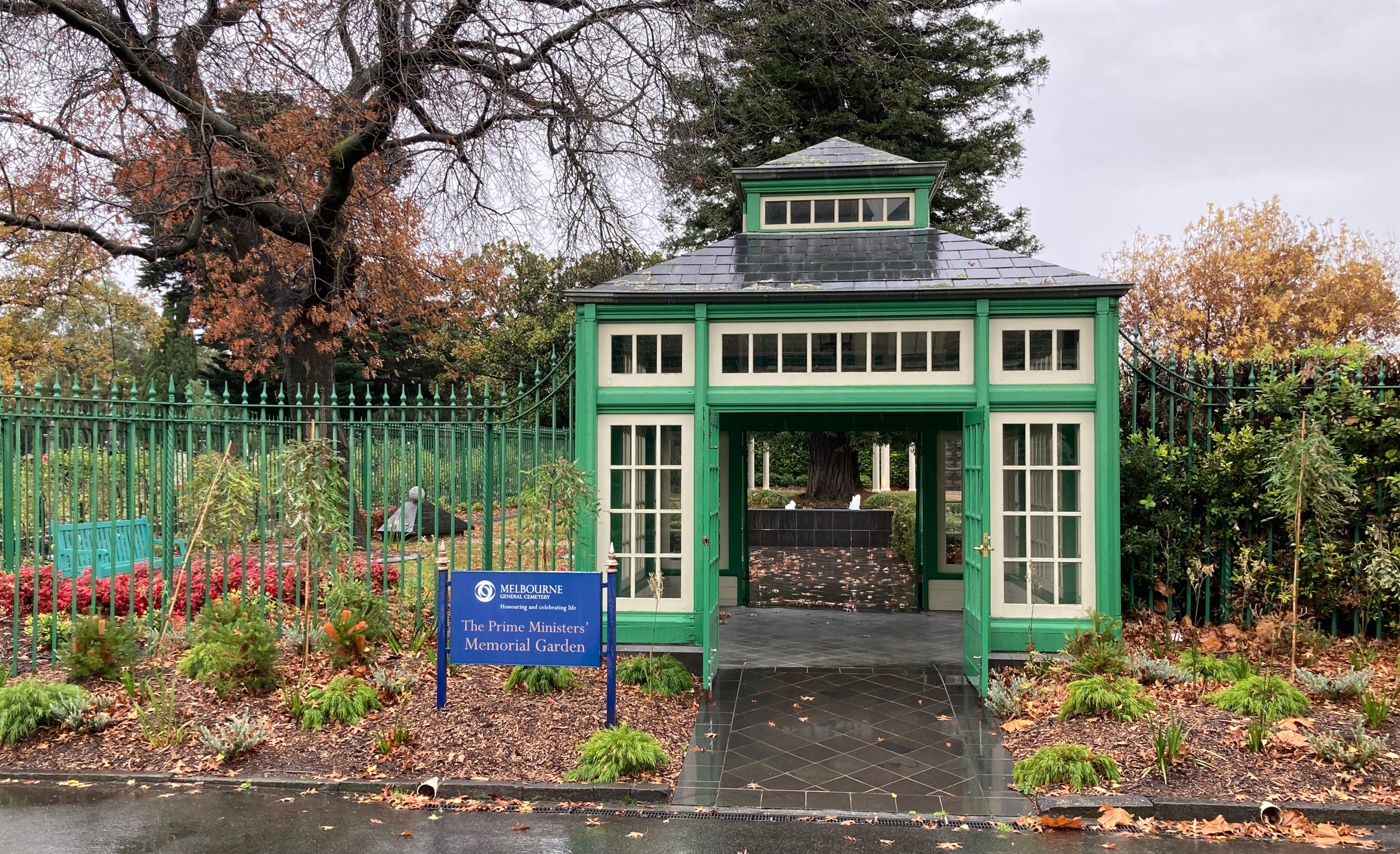
Garden entrance

Grave of James and Sarah Scullin

Grave of Sir Robert and Dame Pattie Menzies

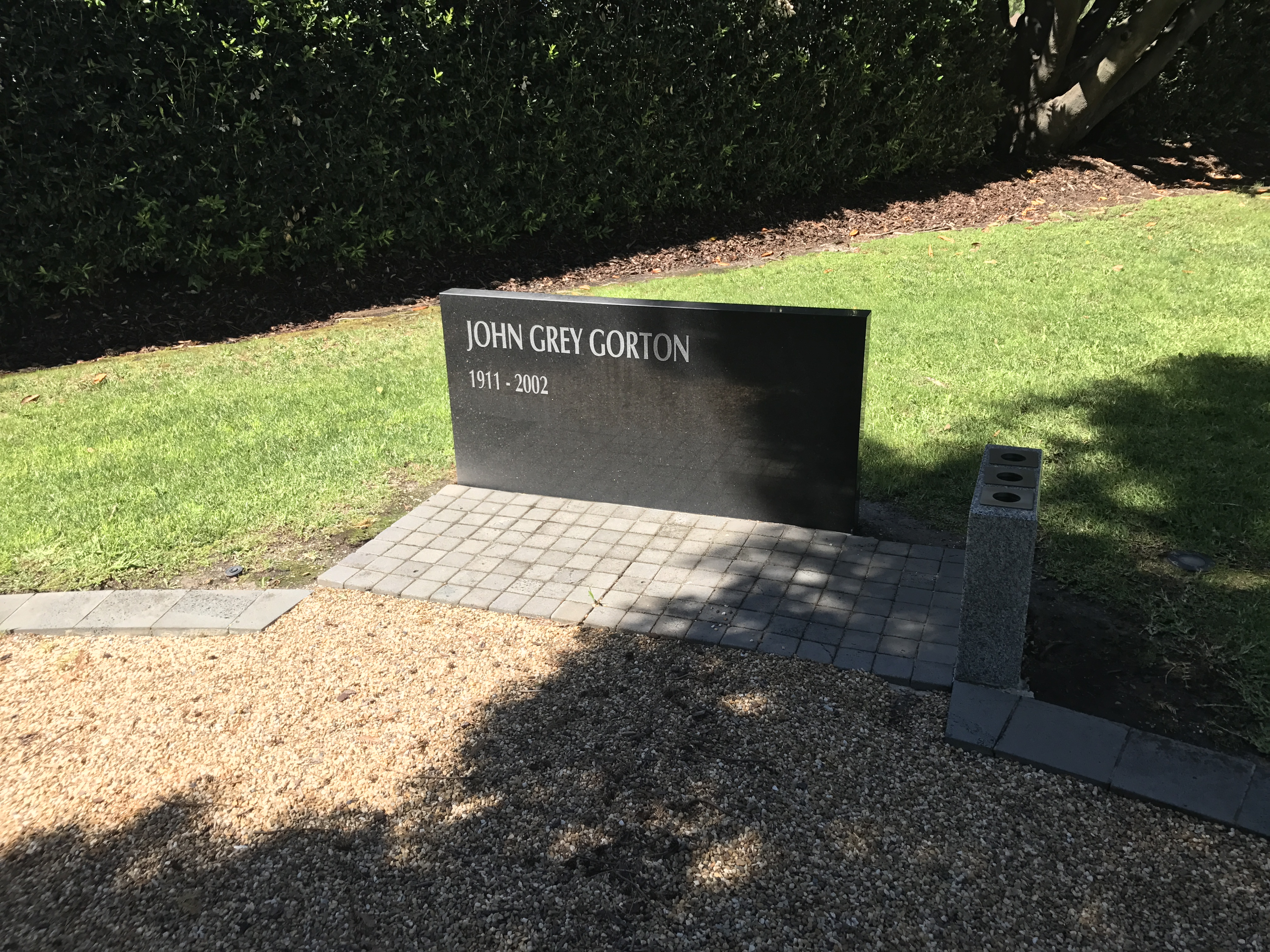
Grave of Sir John Gorton

Memorial to Harold Holt and Dame Zara

Grave of Malcolm Fraser

=== State Premiers and Governors ===
There are eight Premiers of Victoria buried in the Melbourne General Cemetery, more than any other necropolis around the state. Premiers George Elmslie, James Francis, Duncan Gillies, Richard Heales, William Nicholson, Sir John O'Shanassy, Sir James Patterson, and James Service. Sir Robert Menzies served as Deputy Premier of Victoria between 1932 and 1934.

The first Premier of Tasmania is interred at Melbourne General Cemetery, William Champ.

There are two Governors of Victoria, Sir Charles Hotham and Sir James Gobbo, and one Governor-General of Australia, Sir Isaac Isaacs, buried at Melbourne General Cemetery.

== War graves ==
The cemetery contains the war graves of 91 Commonwealth service personnel, more than 30 from World War I and more than 50 from World War II.

== Elvis Presley memorial ==
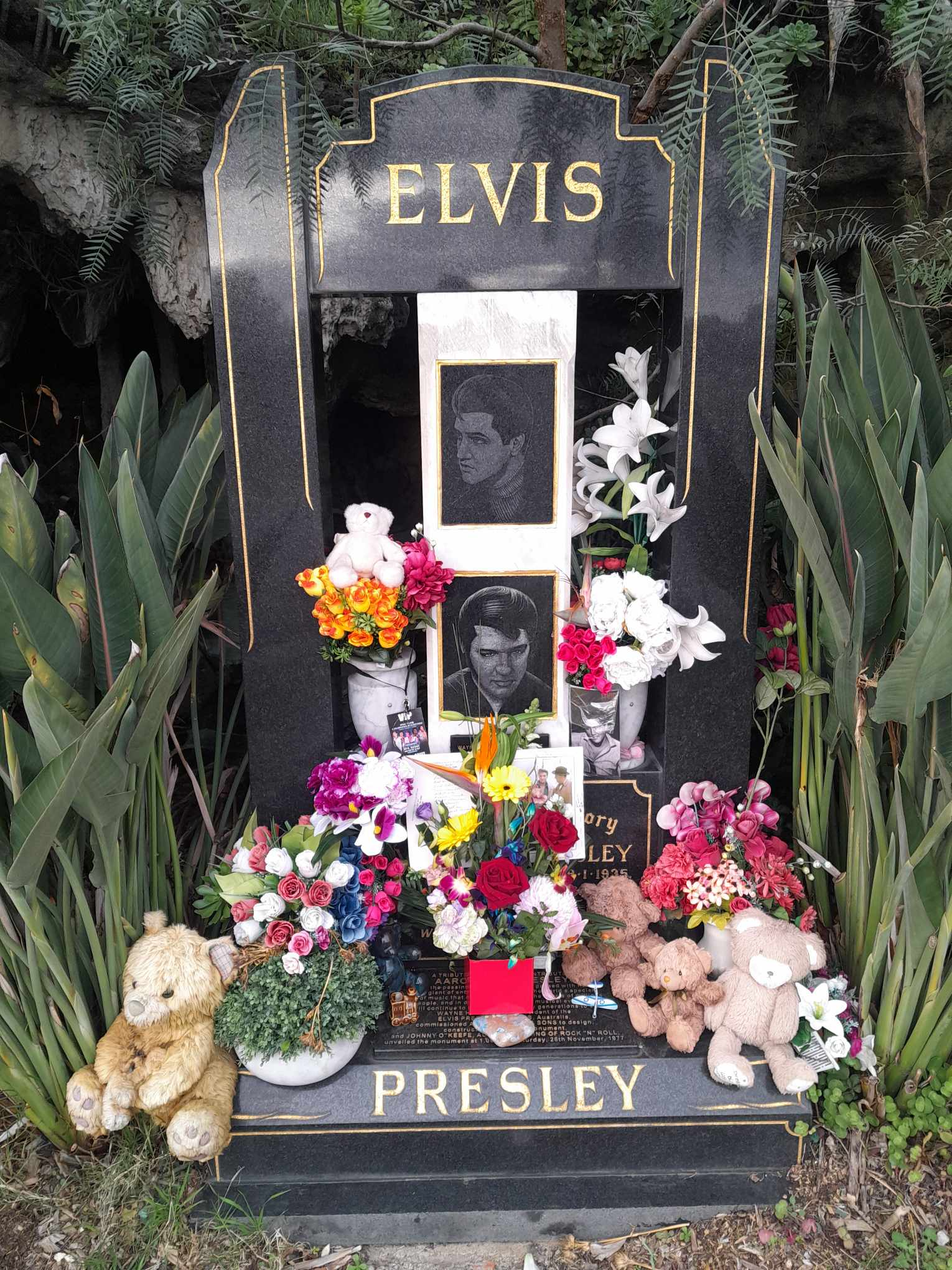
Tributes for Elvis Presley on the 47th anniversary of his death at the cemetery's memorial on 16 August 2024.

A monument in memory of Elvis Presley was erected in the cemetery by the Elvis Presley Fan Club of Victoria on 26 November 1977, three months after the singer's passing on 16 August of that year. The monument was commissioned by fan club president Wayne Hawthorne, personally approved by Vernon Presley and erected even before the equivalent monument in Presley's hometown of Memphis, Tennessee. It was unveiled by Johnny O'Keefe, just under a year before his own passing on 6 October 1978.

Fan club vigils were initially held at the monument but these were cancelled because of the undue media attention they attracted. One particular incident saw local TV camera crews causing a traffic jam that held up a funeral procession for a recently deceased person. The decision was then made to simply allow fans to visit in their own time. The monument is regularly visited by Presley fans to this day and especially on 16 August, the anniversary of his death.

The monument's original inscription reads "Elvis Aron Presley" although his middle name is often also spelt as "Aaron", including on Presley's actual grave at Graceland. Both spellings were used interchangeably by Presley throughout his lifetime. A fan club dispute led to a second plaque being added with the spelling "Aaron" that also provided more historical context about the monument and mentioned O'Keefe's unveiling in late 1977. However, mistakes were apparently made during the making of the second plaque and "Aaron" was incorrectly written as Presley's given name - "Aaron Elvis Presley" - and O'Keefe's name was written "O"Keefe" with a quotation mark instead of an apostrophe. These errors remained intact until 2026, when a talkback caller brought them to the attention of 774 ABC Melbourne radio presenter Charlie Pickering. Pickering was able to contact Hawthorne and cemetery management and convince them the errors needed to be corrected. A new plaque with the same inscription but reading "Elvis Presley" and "Johnny O'Keefe" was unveiled on 16 August 2026, the 49th anniversary of Presley's death.
