= The Gatehouse Mausoleum =

Building in Melbourne, Australia

Coordinates: 37.791421°S 144.961906°E

The Gatehouse Mausoleum is a building located in Parkville, Melbourne, Australia.

It was designed by Philip Harmer of Harmer Architecture, and sits tucked under the existing historical gatehouse along College Crescent in Parkville. It was constructed in 2004 and took 9 months to complete.

It is the fourth mausoleum built by Harmer Architecture, built to extend the Melbourne General Cemetery, the first modern burial site in Melbourne with over 500,000 interments since its inception in the 1850s. The Gatehouse Mausoleum adds an addition 618 burial spaces. The adjacent gate to which it connects was built by John Growler from 1934 to 1935 and opens onto College Crescent.

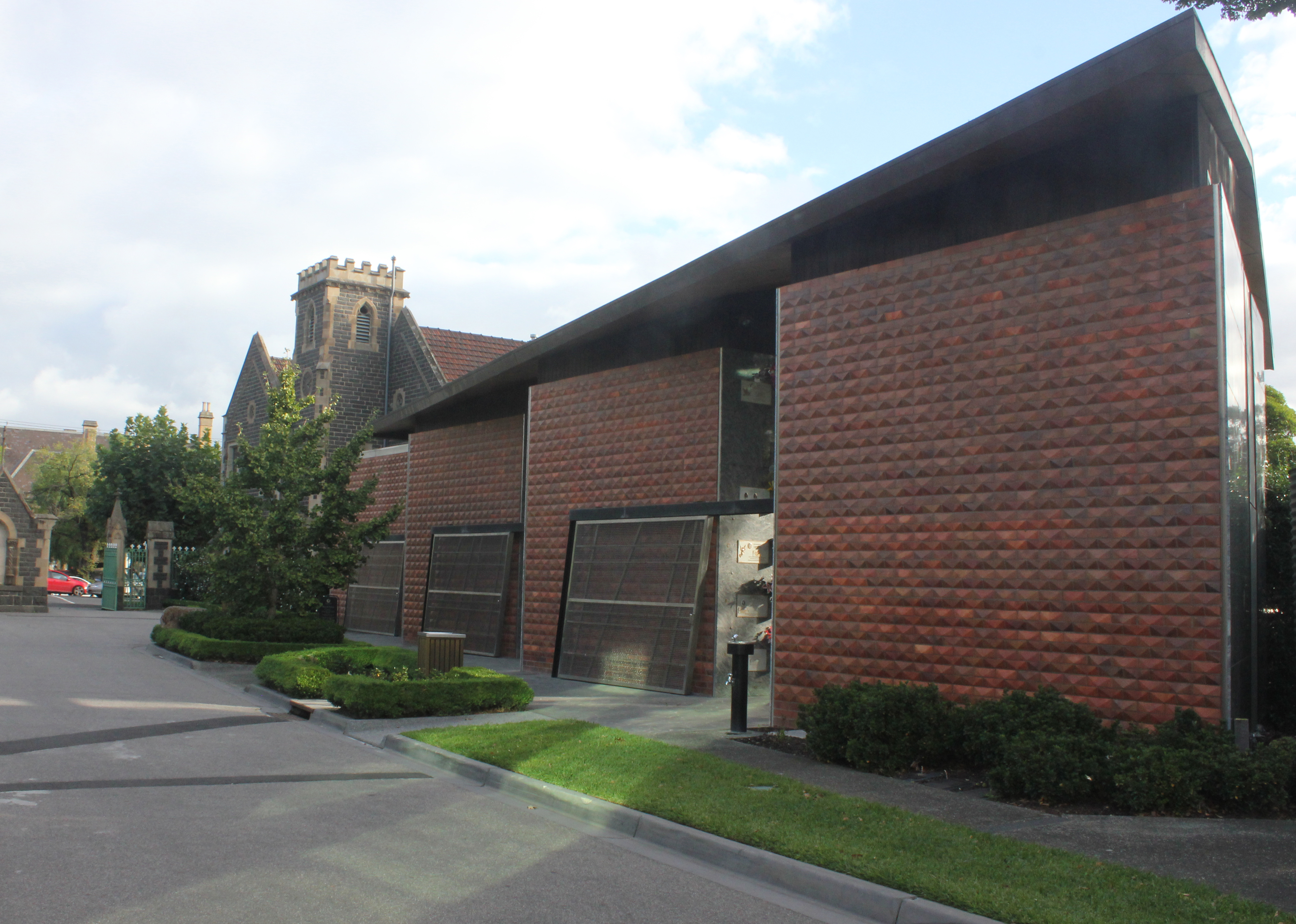
Front of the Gatehouse Mausoleum from Entrance Drive, in the afternoon showing shadows

== Description ==
The site is located between the existing gatehouse and Princes Park Drive, which guides the curve of the fan-shaped roof. The roof is corrugated, a nod towards traditional Australian architecture, and is punctuated with irregular skylights that serve as the only light for the interior space.

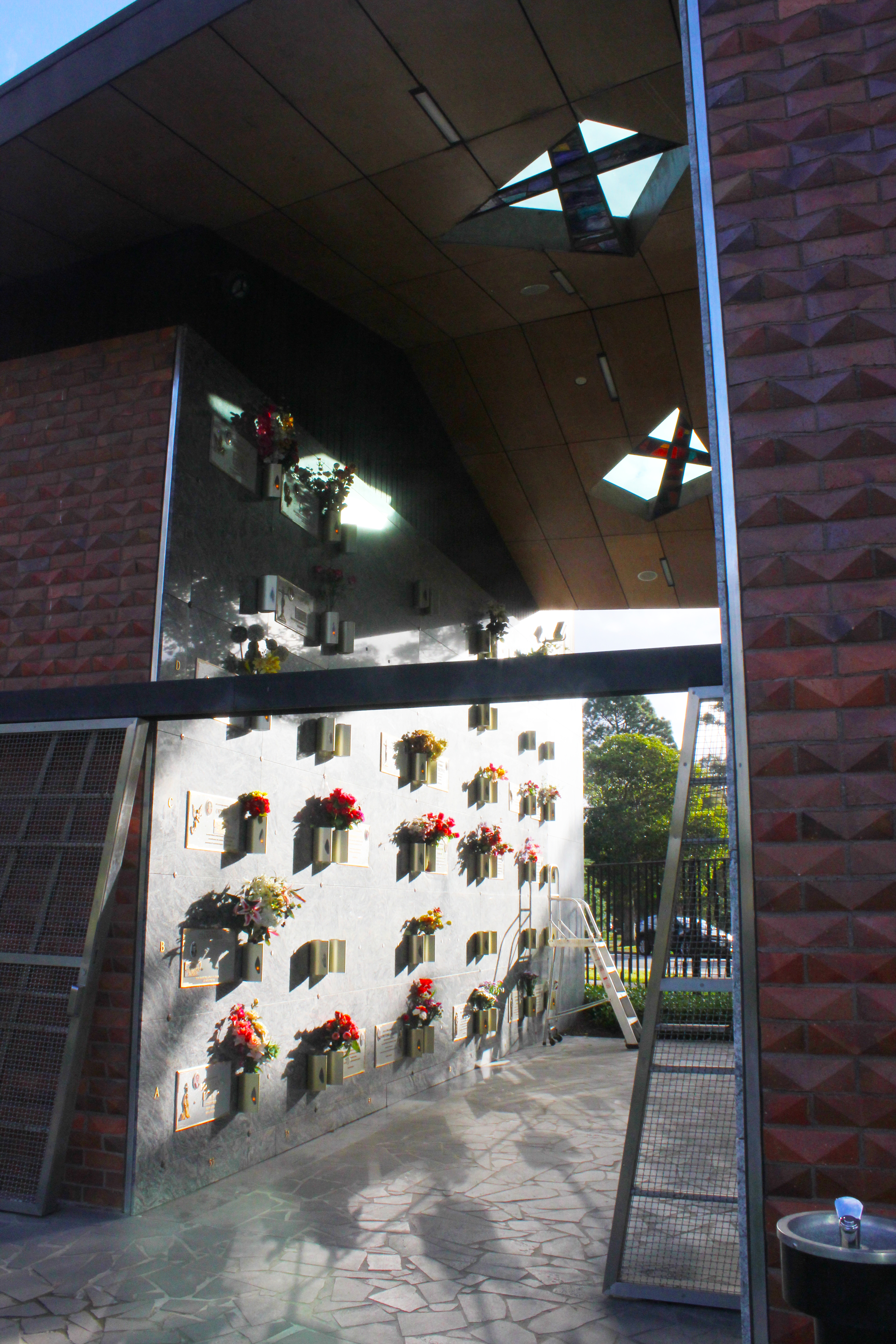
Gatehouse Mausoleum Crypts

Between the gatehouse and the mausoleum is an expanse of glass punctuated with thin vertical columns. The glass ceiling is frosted and patterned with clear crosses. The crosses on the ceiling were designed by Philip Harmer and Andrew Ferguson, of Stained Glass Art, and were made handmade or mouth-blown stained glass. The only source of electronic light in the space are security lights.

The exterior is composed primarily of polished granite and pyramid-shaped bricks. Three rows of walls run from east to west on the site and demarcate and divide the galleries within. The walls are distinguished by a series of cast bronze panels, each its own gallery. Each has a stainless steel mesh gate with black steel frames.

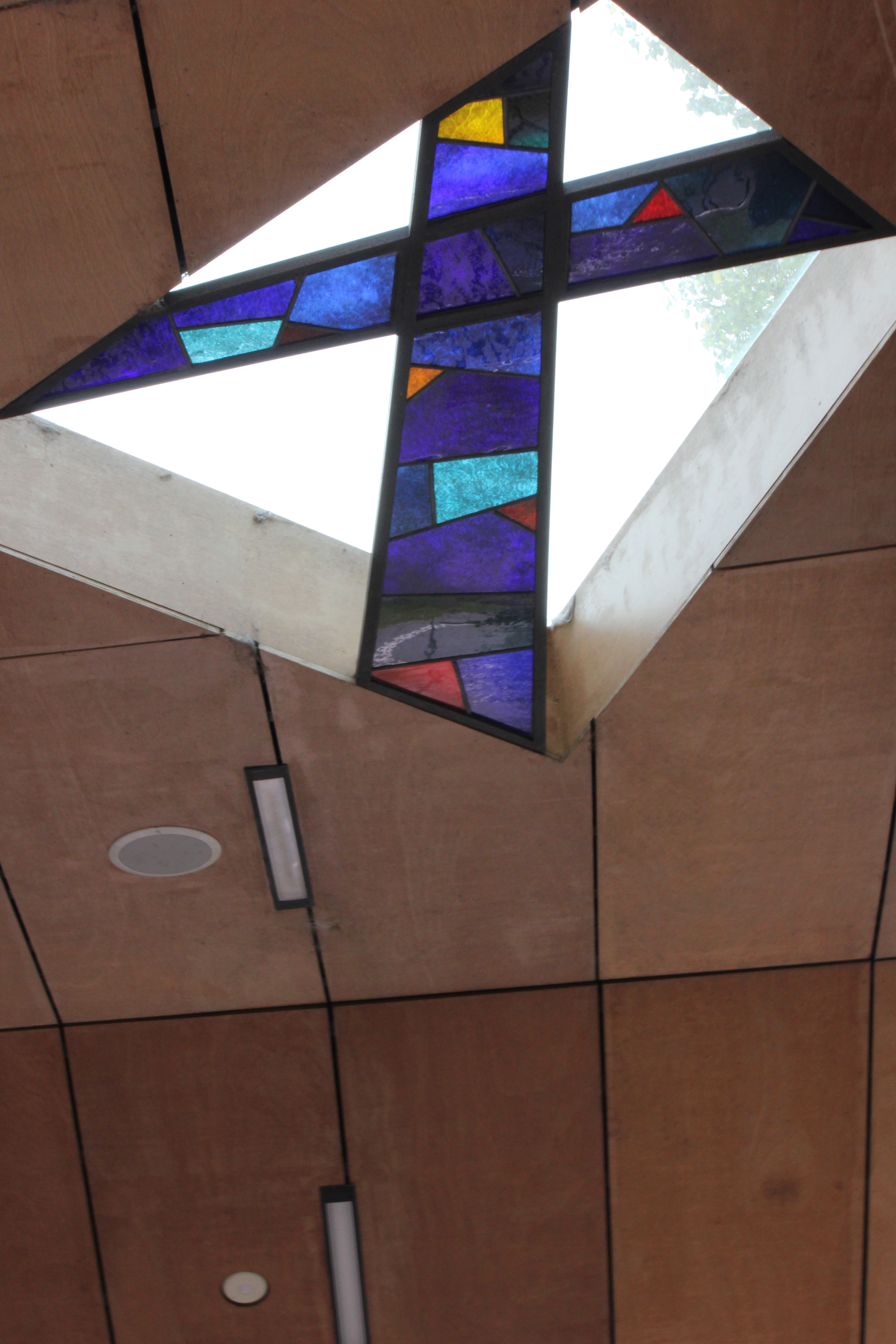
An internal shot of the Gatehouse Mausoleum showing one skylight of a few

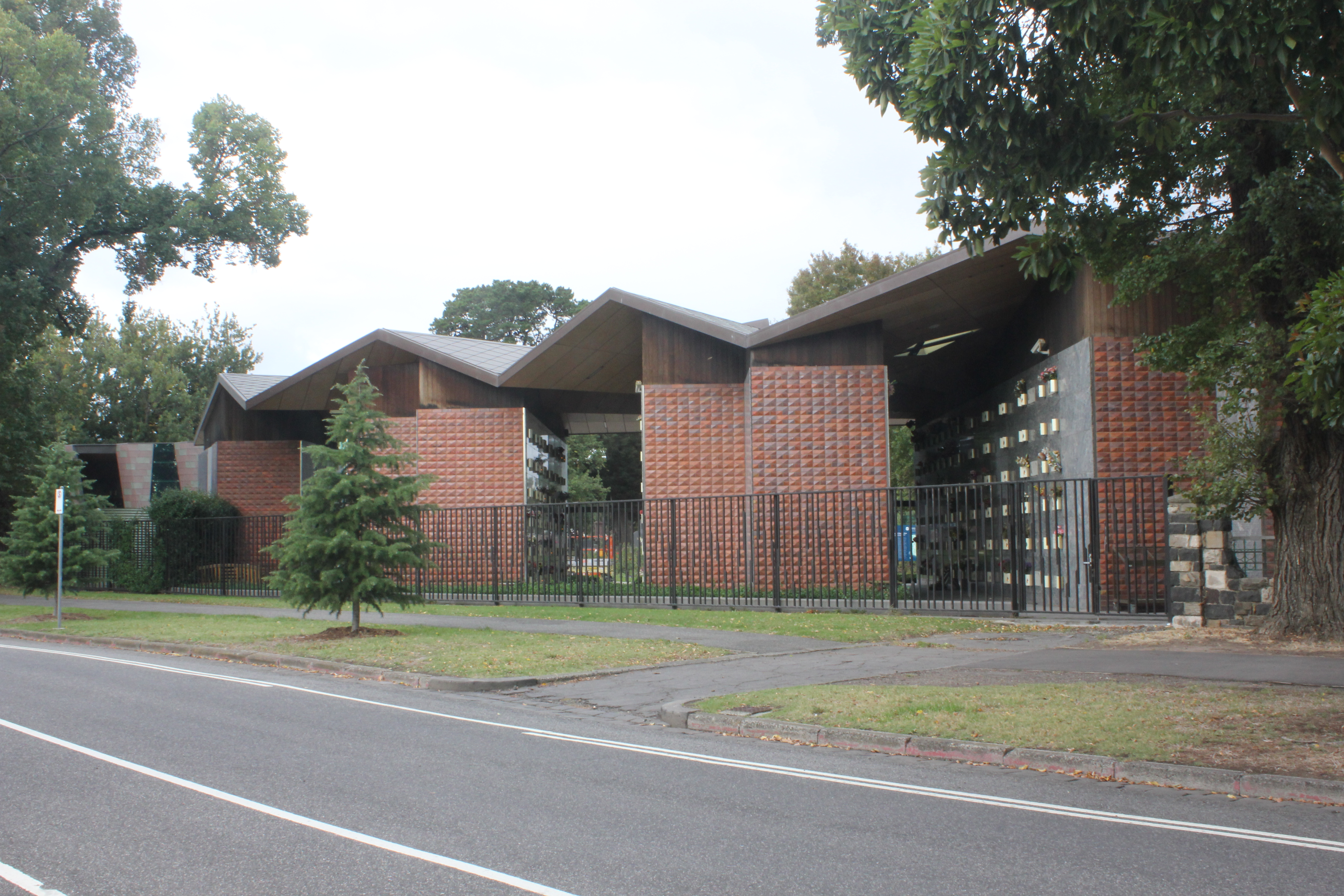
Rear of the Gatehouse Mausoleum from Princess Park Drive

== Design intent ==
The main parties interested in the construction of the site included Heritage Victorian, the Melbourne City Council Planning and Urban Design Departments, and the National Trust. The mausoleum was also intended for the Italian community in Melbourne. The brief required that the site have the maximum return within the constraints of both the site and the heritage trustees who oversaw the project. The result is a structure with a “strong simplicity of structure infuse with fine architectural details”.

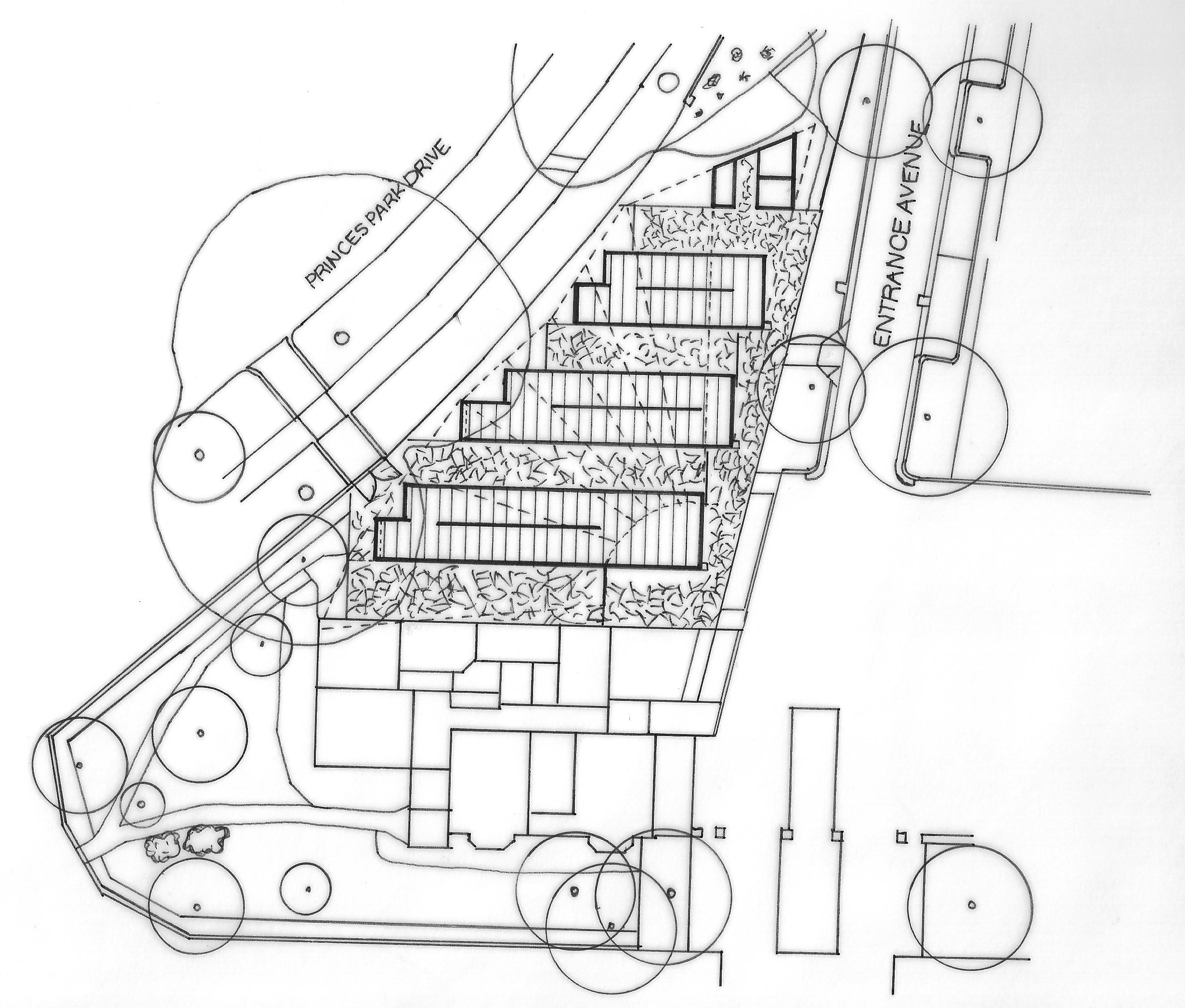
Site plan of the Gatehouse Mausoleum showing site constraints

== Awards ==
- RAIA Award for Institutional Alterations and Extensions
