= James Scullin =

Prime Minister of Australia from 1929 to 1932

The Right Honourable James Scullin
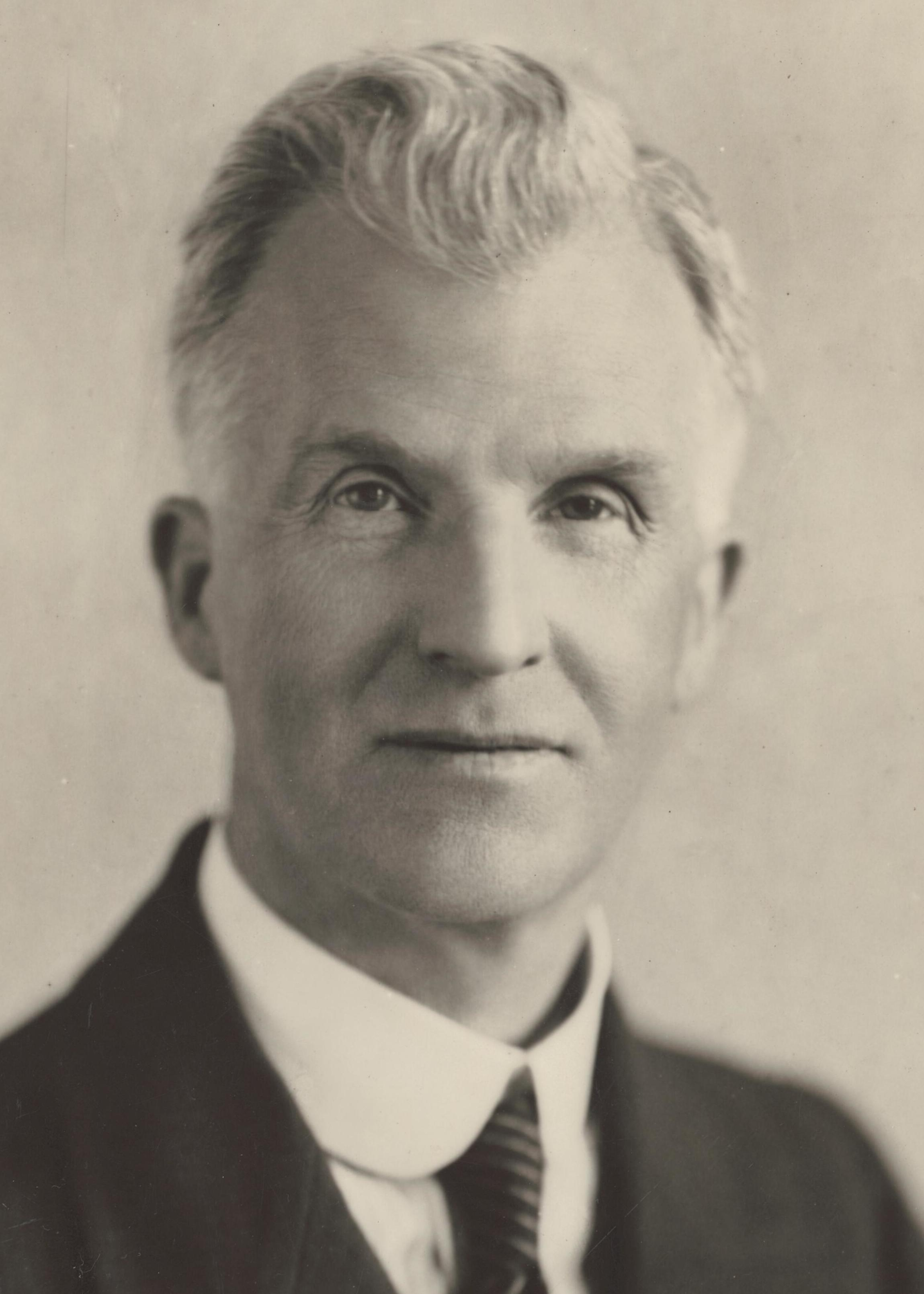
- Scullin c. 1932

9th Prime Minister of Australia
- In office 22 October 1929 – 6 January 1932
- Monarch: George V
- Governors General: John Baird; Isaac Isaacs
- Deputy: Ted Theodore
- Preceded by: Stanley Bruce
- Succeeded by: Joseph Lyons

Leader of the Opposition
- In office 6 January 1932 – 1 October 1935
- Prime Minister: Joseph Lyons
- Deputy: Frank Forde
- Preceded by: Joseph Lyons
- Succeeded by: John Curtin
- In office 29 March 1928 – 22 October 1929
- Prime Minister: Stanley Bruce
- Deputy: Arthur Blakeley; Ted Theodore
- Preceded by: Matthew Charlton
- Succeeded by: John Latham

Leader of the Labor Party
- In office 26 April 1928 – 1 October 1935
- Deputy: Arthur Blakeley; Ted Theodore; Frank Forde
- Preceded by: Matthew Charlton
- Succeeded by: John Curtin

Deputy Leader of the Labor Party
- In office 17 March 1927 – 29 March 1928
- Leader: Matthew Charlton
- Preceded by: Albert Gardiner
- Succeeded by: Arthur Blakeley
Cabinet posts
13th Treasurer of Australia
In office 9 July 1930 – 29 January 1931
| Preceded by | Ted Theodore |
| Succeeded by | Ted Theodore |
Minister for Industry
In office 22 October 1929 – 6 January 1932
| Preceded by | John Latham |
| Succeeded by | John Latham |
Minister for External Affairs
In office 22 October 1929 – 6 January 1932
| Preceded by | Stanley Bruce |
| Succeeded by | John Latham |
Electorate
Member of the Australian Parliament for Yarra
In office 18 February 1922 – 31 October 1949
| Preceded by | Frank Tudor |
| Succeeded by | Stan Keon |
Member of the Australian Parliament for Corangamite
In office 13 April 1910 – 31 May 1913
| Preceded by | John Gratton Wilson |
| Succeeded by | James Chester Manifold |

Personal details
- Born: James Henry Scullin; 18 September 1876 Trawalla, Colony of Victoria
- Died: 28 January 1953 (aged 76) Melbourne, Victoria, Australia
- Resting place: Melbourne General Cemetery
- Party: Labor
- Spouse: Sarah McNamara (m. 1907)
- Education: Mount Rowan State School
- Occupation: Trade unionist; politician

James Henry Scullin (18 September 1876 – 28 January 1953) was the ninth prime minister of Australia, serving from 1929 to 1932. He held office as the leader of the Australian Labor Party (ALP), having briefly served as treasurer of Australia during his time in office from 1930 to 1931. His time in office was primarily categorised by the Wall Street crash of 1929 which transpired just two days after his swearing in, thus heralding the beginning of the Great Depression in Australia. Scullin remained a leading figure in the Labor movement throughout his lifetime, and was an éminence grise in various capacities for the party until his retirement from federal parliament in 1949. He was the first Catholic to serve as prime minister.

The son of working-class Irish-immigrants, Scullin spent much of his early life as a laborer and grocer in Ballarat. An autodidact and passionate debater, Scullin made the most of Ballarat's facilities – the public library and South Street Debating Society. He joined the Australian Labor Party in 1903, beginning a career spanning five decades. He was a political organizer and newspaper editor for the party, and was elected to the Australian House of Representatives first in 1910 and then again in 1922 until 1949. Scullin quickly established himself as a leading voice in parliament, rapidly rising to become deputy leader of the party in 1927 and then Leader of the Opposition in 1928.

After Scullin won a landslide election in 1929, events took a dramatic change with the crisis on Wall Street and the rapid onset of the Great Depression around the world, which hit heavily indebted Australia hard. Scullin and his Treasurer Ted Theodore responded by developing several plans during 1930 and 1931 to repay foreign debt, provide relief to farmers and create economic stimulus to curb unemployment based on deficit spending and expansionary monetary policy. Although the Keynesian Revolution would see these ideas adopted by most Western nations by the end of the decade, in 1931 such ideas were considered radical and the plans were bitterly opposed by many who feared hyperinflation and economic ruin. The still opposition-dominated Australian Senate, and the conservative-dominated boards of the Commonwealth Bank and Loan Council, repeatedly blocked the plans.

With the prospect of bankruptcy facing the government, Scullin backed down and instead advanced the Premiers' Plan, a far more conservative measure that met the crisis with severe cutbacks in government spending. Pensioners and other core Labor constituencies were severely affected by the cuts, leading to a widespread revolt and multiple defections in parliament. After several months of infighting the government collapsed, and was resoundingly defeated by the newly formed United Australia Party at the subsequent 1931 election.

Scullin would remain party leader for four more years, losing the 1934 election but the party split would not be healed until after Scullin's return to the backbenches in 1935. In his later career, he became a respected authority within the party on public finance and taxation, and would eventually play a significant role in reforming both when Labor returned to government in 1941. Though he never sat at the cabinet table again, he was a close advisor to John Curtin in particular, and remained MP for Yarra until standing down at the 1949 election. Although disappointed with his own term of office, he lived long enough to see the Curtin and Chifley governments implement many of his ideas before his death in January 1953 at the age of 76.

== Early life ==
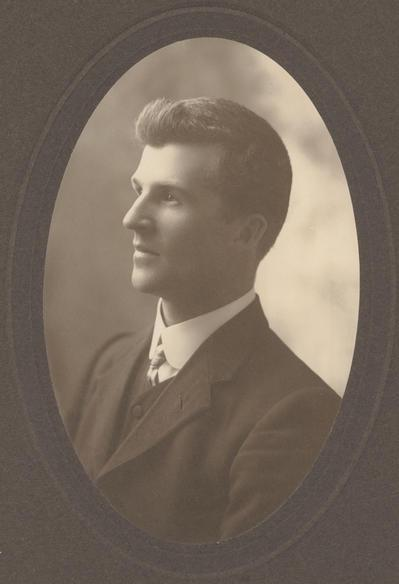
Scullin in the 1900s

Scullin was born in Trawalla, Victoria on 18 September 1876. His parents, John and Ann (née Logan) Scullin, were both Irish Catholics from County Londonderry. His father was a railway labourer, who emigrated to Australia in his 20s. His mother joined her husband in Australia later. James was the fourth of eight children, and grew up in a tight-knit and devoutly Catholic home. James attended the Trawalla State School from 1881 to 1887 and earned an early reputation as an active and quick-witted boy, though never physically robust. These characteristics would remain with him for life.

The family moved to Mount Rowan, Ballarat, in 1887, and the young James attended school at Mount Rowan State School until 12. Thereafter he held various manual odd-jobs in the Ballarat district until about 1900, and for ten years from 1900 he ran a grocer's shop in Ballarat. In his mid-20s he attended night school, was a voracious reader and became somewhat of an autodidact. He joined a number of societies and was active in the Australian Natives' Association and the Catholic Young Men's Society, eventually becoming president of the latter. He was also a skilled debater, participating in local competitions and having an association with the Ballarat South Street debating society for nearly 30 years, which would prove formative to his interest and talent in politics. Scullin was a devout Roman Catholic, a non-drinker and a non-smoker all his life.

Scullin became active in politics during his years in Ballarat, being influenced by the ideas of Tom Mann and the growing labour movement in Victoria, as were many of his later ministerial colleagues such as Frank Anstey, John Curtin and Frank Brennan. He became a foundation member of his local Political Labor Council in 1903 and was active in local politics thereafter. He was a campaigner and political organizer for the Australian Workers' Union, the union movement with which he would remain most closely associated throughout his career. He spoke often around Ballarat on political issues and helped with Labor campaigns at state and federal level. At the 1906 federal election he was selected as the Labor candidate for the Division of Ballaarat against then Prime Minister Alfred Deakin. Although a race in which Labor had virtually no chance of winning, Scullin ran a spirited campaign and impressed those within the movement for his efforts.

On 11 November 1907 he married Sarah Maria McNamara, a dressmaker from Ballarat. The marriage was childless. Due to Scullin's frequent and often serious bouts of illness over his long career, Sarah served the role as her husband's protector and was a crucial source of support and care for her husband, particularly in his final years. She was frequently called to assist or stand in for her husband at social occasions when her husband's illness prevented him from attending personally. She was an active member of the Labor Party herself, and would remain well-informed on politics. Very unusually among Australian political spouses (and even more so during the period of her husband's career), Sarah would often attend parliamentary sessions, and would even be present during the debate and vote that brought her husband's government down.

== Political career ==
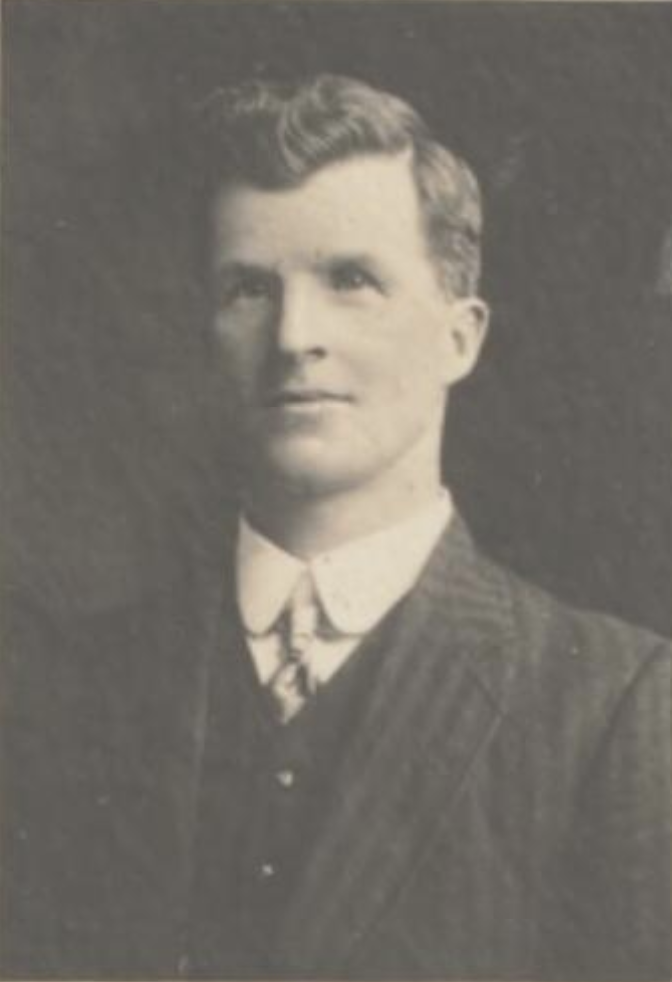
Scullin following his election as MP in 1910

In 1910 Scullin won his first election as the Labor candidate in Corangamite, in a year when Labor's Andrew Fisher surged in the polls and formed Australia's first majority government. Scullin had done much to personally build the grass-roots organisation of the Labor movement in this seat in the years prior to the election, although its rural character meant it was not considered a seat naturally sympathetic to Labor. His campaign focused on increasing the powers of the Federal parliament and issues such as defending a white Australia, higher import duties and the introduction of a land tax. In federal parliament, Scullin quickly earned a reputation as an impressive and formidable parliamentary debater. He spoke on a wide range of issues over the three years of his term, but concentrated especially on matters relating to taxation and the powers of the Commonwealth, both of which would become signature issues for Scullin throughout his career. By the end of his first year in parliament he had a reputation as "one of the most ardent land-taxers in the Labor party" and had spoken frequently on breaking up "the land monopoly which has for so many years retarded the growth of this young country." Scullin enthusiastically supported Fisher's referendum questions in expand Commonwealth power over in 1911 and again in 1913, though in both cases all amendment proposals were rejected by comfortable majorities. Although he was well regarded in his district and hard-working and ardent, it was not enough to shield him from Joseph Cook's resurgent and now united Commonwealth Liberal Party in the election of 1913, and Scullin suffered the fate of many Labor members in rural districts at that year's election. He tried and failed to reacquire the seat at the 1918 Corangamite by-election.

After defeat Scullin was appointed as editor of the Evening Echo, a daily newspaper owned by the Australian Workers Union in Ballarat. He would hold this position for the next nine years, which solidified his position within the Victorian Labor movement and made him an influential voice within its ranks, being elected president of the Victorian state branch of Labor in 1918. He and his paper became leading voices against conscription in Victoria during World War I, and a forceful intellectual contributor to the party during the Billy Hughes years. At the special Labor conference on conscription in 1916, Scullin moved for the expulsion of the conscriptionists, including Prime Minister Hughes and former prime minister Chris Watson. During these years Scullin earned a reputation as a socialist on the left wing of the party and had radicalised in some of his opinions, particularly his sentiments against imperial domination from London. Scullin was fiercely patriotic and critical of the war, particularly Britain's leadership of the dominions within it. In the early 1920s Scullin was prominent in the push for the party to adopt economic socialisation policies as part of its platform.

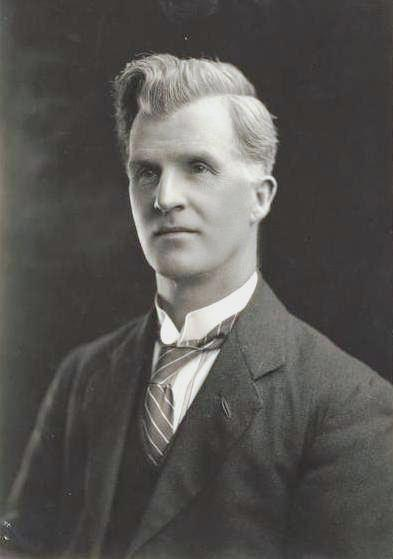
Scullin during the 1920s

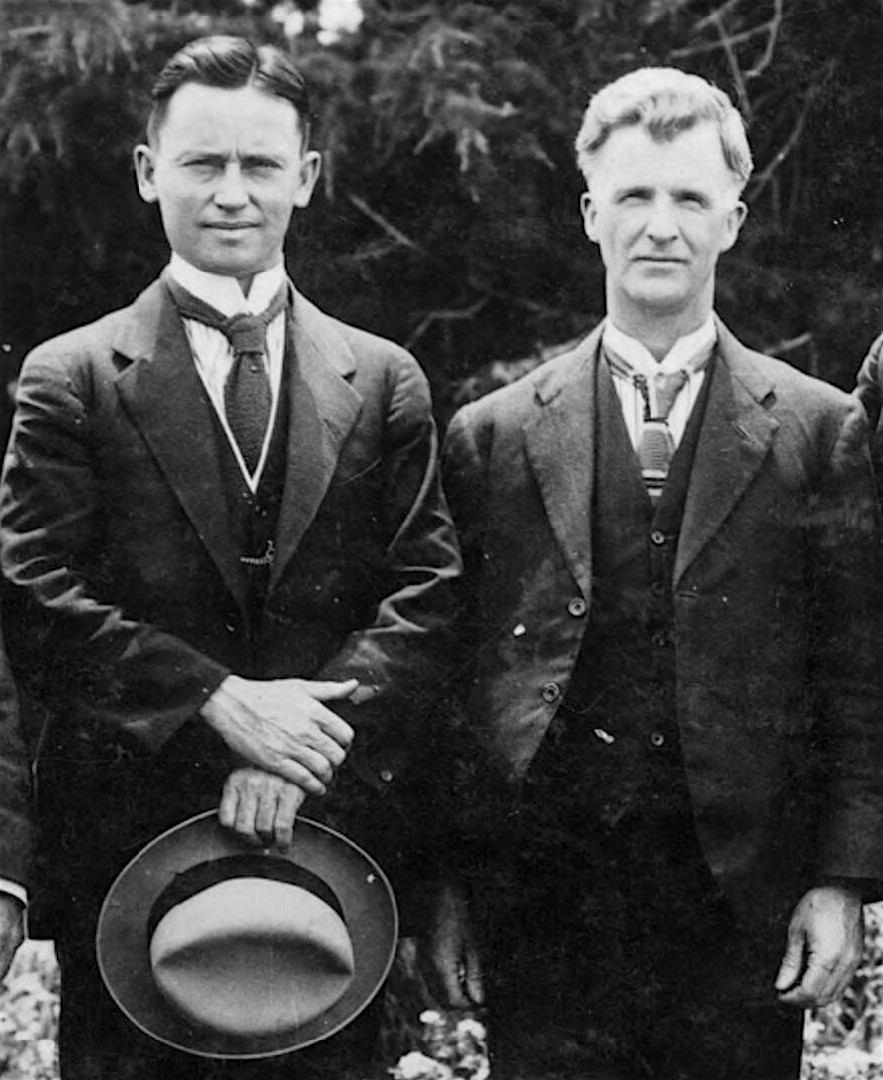
Scullin with his future deputy Frank Forde

The death of federal Labor leader Frank Tudor left a vacancy in the very safe urban seat of the Division of Yarra in Melbourne. Scullin handily won Labor preselection over several other candidates, and in February 1922 he took the seat at the ensuing 1922 Yarra by-election with more than three-quarters of the vote. With his win, he and his family relocated to Richmond, away from his long-time home of Ballarat, and to an electorate completely different in character to his earlier seat of Corangamite. However his new proximity to the Federal parliament (still located in Melbourne) and representation of a safe seat afforded many more political opportunities and freedoms, and soon Scullin was a prominent figure on the Labor campaign trail and appearing at events around the country. In these years Scullin's renown increased considerably within the party and the nation at large. He became one of the leading lights of the parliamentary opposition, and was quickly elevated to the Australian Labor Party National Executive in February 1923.

During his years as an opposition backbencher, Scullin spoke frequently and passionately. He was an able debater and parliamentary performer, but also carved out a niche as a leading voice on several issues, particularly taxation and economic policy. Some of Scullin's charges on land-tax avoidance by wealthy pastoralists were so damning that the Bruce government called a Royal Commission specifically to investigate his claims. Scullin's competence on financial matters proved useful to the government as well, and several of his suggestions from the opposition bench made their way into government legislation. In March 1927 Scullin became the parliamentary ALP's deputy leader.

== Leader of the Opposition ==
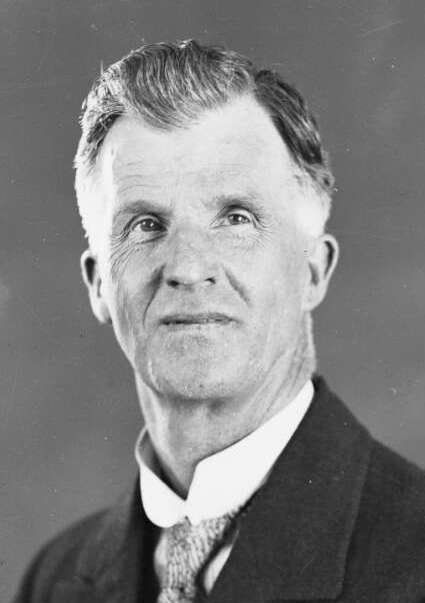
Scullin as Opposition leader in October 1928

As deputy leader, Scullin excelled in taking the case to the government. Throughout 1927 Scullin earned particular acclaim in keeping the ageing Bruce government to account on economic and financial matters. A series of speeches by Scullin that year on the Government's mishandling of the economy, and the generally dangerous trajectory of Commonwealth financial policy, predicted catastrophe. He accused the government of spending too much, borrowing too much from overseas sources, and not rectifying a worrying excess of imports over exports: a three-part recipe for disaster. This alarming analysis of the Australian economy would prove to be correct within three years, however relatively few paid attention to Scullin's warning at the time, nor the prescient 1927 volume The Boom of 1890 – And Now by E.O.G. Shann, on which Scullin based many of his arguments.

In March 1928, Matthew Charlton resigned as federal Labor leader and was replaced by Scullin in a unanimous motion, although some had their eye on newcomer Ted Theodore as a more promising replacement. The ensuing contest over the position of deputy leader saw Theodore denied once again in a close vote, foreshadowing some of the future controversy he would stir up within the party under Scullin.

Scullin led Labor at the 1928 election. He visited widely around the country, and made especial focus on Western Australia, Tasmania and Queensland – states where the Labor party's fortunes had greatly declined in previous years. Scullin was well received and made ground in these areas, as well as in rural districts to counteract the increasingly urban nature of Labor. Labor managed to take eight seats, significantly reducing the Coalition's previously large majority. This was due to a swing against the government rather than a swing towards Labor, but was still enough to put Labor within striking distance of winning the next election. Although Labor came up well short of forming government, the campaign was viewed as a success and Scullin's reputation remained intact as leader.

1929 was dogged by industrial disputes, the worst of which occurred within the waterfront, timber and coalmining sectors. The Bruce government struggled to manage these episodes – its proposal by referendum for greater Commonwealth industrial powers had been rejected in 1926. After months of deadlock and protests over decisions of the Federal Arbitration Court, Bruce reversed course entirely by proposing that the Commonwealth dismantle federal arbitration and hand industrial matters back entirely to the states. The proposal was a radical departure from one of the pillars of the so-called "Australian settlement", and several MPs, led by former PM Billy Hughes, ultimately voted against the government and forced Bruce to seek an additional mandate from the people, at the 1929 election. Crucially, it would be a House-only election as the 1925 Senate term had not expired. Just 9 months after the previous campaign, Australia was in campaign mode once more. Amidst a background of industrial strife and heavy handed government proposals to deal with it, Scullin, who preached conciliation and negotiation between the parties, seemed the moderate choice, despite the more radical stances otherwise held by Labor. Fighting on their home territory and in favour of what was a still popular status-quo in industrial relations law, Scullin and Labor romped home in the polls, winning 46 seats in the 75 seat chamber, the most they had ever won at the time. Labor even managed to oust Bruce in his own seat. The party was jubilant and Scullin enthusiastically accepted commission to become prime minister. He was to be Australia's first Catholic prime minister.

== Prime minister ==
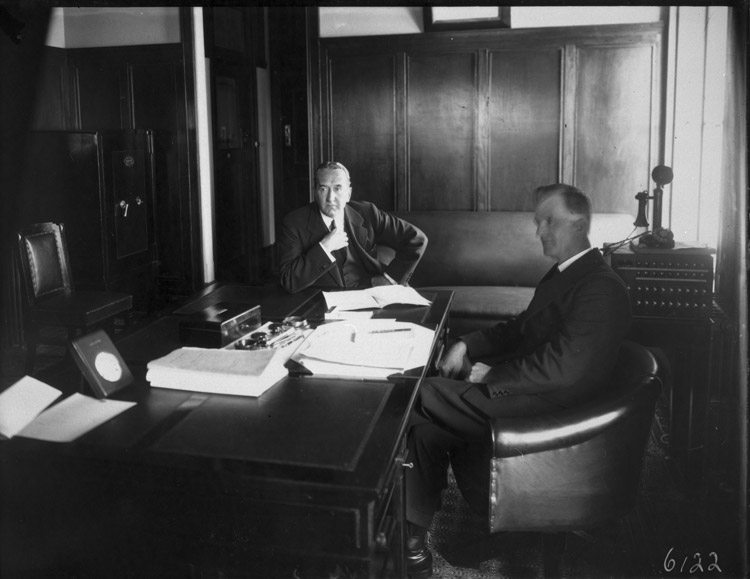
New prime minister James Scullin and former prime minister Stanley Bruce hold a private meeting after Scullin's swearing-in as prime minister, 1929

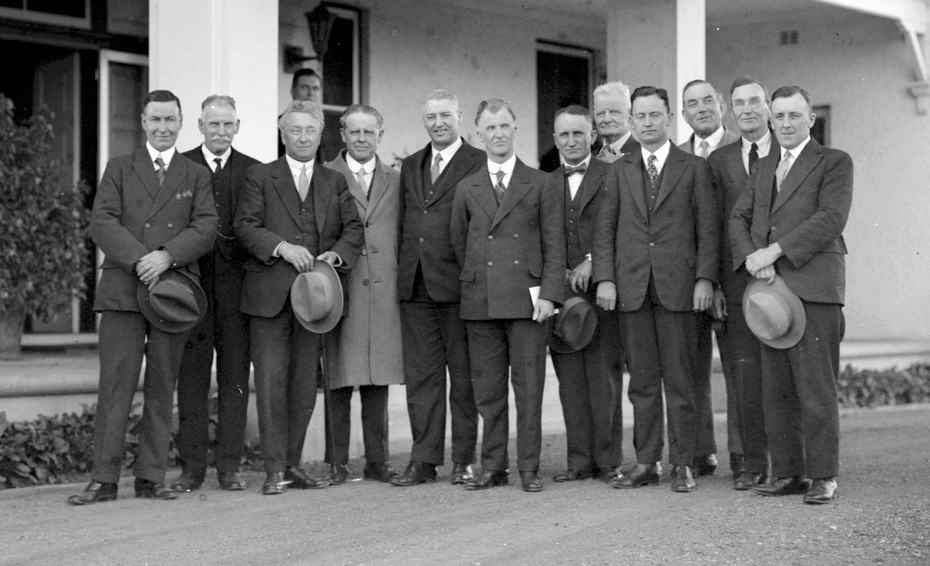
The Scullin government sworn in, October 1929

Scullin came to Canberra amid rapturous applause from his supporters and the largest majority that Labor had ever won at the time. However, the party had many diverse interests and factions within it, ranging from metropolitan socialist radicals to rural professional politicians. The Scullin government immediately rolled back several of the Bruce government's measures deemed to be anti-labor – including changes made to industrial arbitration and competition, and the immediate abolition of compulsory military training. Scullin also chose not to take residence in The Lodge, which had only been completed two years prior, citing its unnecessary extravagance and cost to the taxpayer. In 1929, the Scullin government established the Canberra University College, while the Commonwealth Workers’ Compensation Act introduced the following year provided (as noted by one study) “a more extensive system of compensation for Commonwealth workers.”

But the government's attention would soon shift to the economy. On the very day Scullin arrived in Canberra after the 1929 election, The Sydney Morning Herald announced large losses on Wall Street. On 24 October, two days after Scullin's cabinet was sworn in, news of Black Thursday reached Australia and the government. The effect these developments would have on the Australian economy were not yet known, as economic conditions were already agreed to be poor, but the portents of future disaster were there. Three of the last four Commonwealth budgets had been in substantial arrears funded by overseas borrowing, and the value of Australian debt had been steadily declining in foreign markets. Sluggish years for the agricultural and manufacturing sectors were compounding the problem, but the most worrying statistic was unemployment, which was just over 13% at the end of 1929. A further problem was the decline in Australian trade. Price for wool and wheat – Australia's two principal exports – had fallen by almost a third during 1929. With debts rising and the ability to repay diminishing, Australia was faced with a seriously troubled financial outlook when Scullin took office.

Scullin's government faced significant limitations on its power to implement its response to the economic crisis. There had been no half-Senate election in 1929, meaning that the Nationalist majority elected at the 1928 election was still in place. The conservative Senate proved hostile to much of Labor's economic program. Scullin also had to contend with a financial establishment in Australia (most notably Commonwealth Bank Board chairman Sir Robert Gibson) and in the United Kingdom (such as Bank of England representative Sir Otto Niemeyer) that was firmly opposed to any deviation from orthodox economics in responding to the Great Depression. On the contrary, there was much disagreement with Scullin's parliamentary party as to how to respond to the crisis, and a great many were sympathetic to the then radical ideas of inflationary finance and other proto-Keynesian approaches. Furthermore, Scullin and his Treasurer Ted Theodore were vehemently opposed to suggestions from the Opposition and Commonwealth Bank to reduce the deficit by cutting Federal welfare emoluments. Thus began two-years of clashes between the government and its opponents, which would prove to be some of the most turbulent in Australian political history.

=== Crisis and deadlock ===
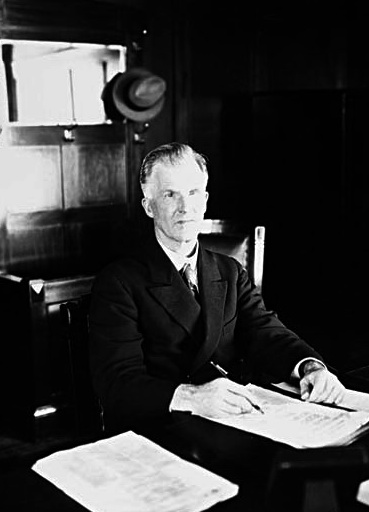
Prime Minister Scullin in 1930

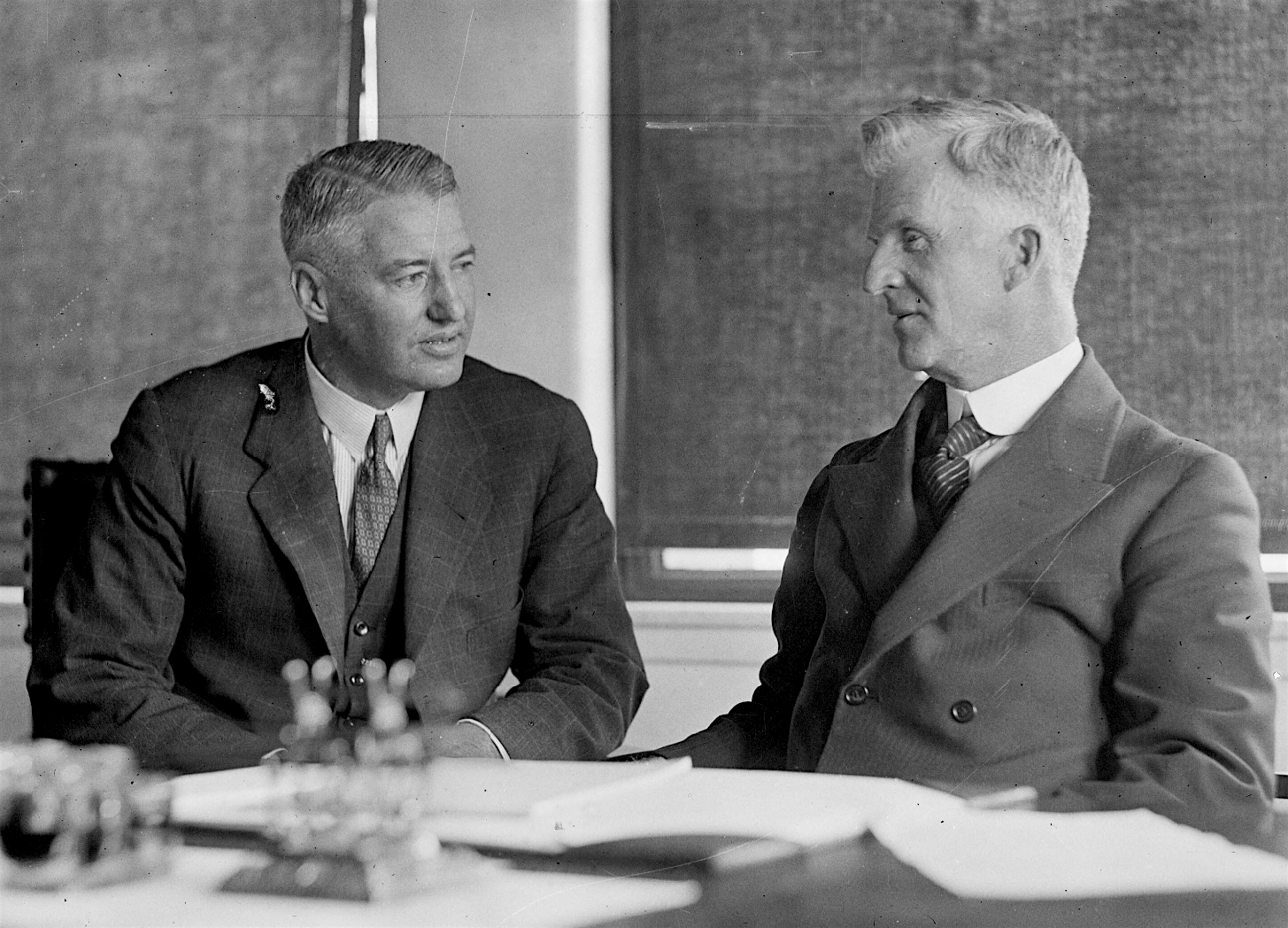
Scullin with his deputy and Treasurer Ted Theodore in December 1929

Ongoing industrial disputes on the coalfields of the Hunter Valley and Newcastle dragged on throughout Scullin's government, the Commonwealth lacking the power to coerce a solution and numerous negotiations between owners and workers collapsed. As a Labor prime minister, expectations ran high that Scullin would force the mine owners to submit to worker demands. Scullin was sympathetic, but refused to go beyond negotiations and inducements to end the disputes. Many within the New South Wales Labor branch were infuriated and felt they had been betrayed, catalysing a beginning of a separation between the state branch (led by fiery demagogue Jack Lang) and the federal party led by Scullin.

Heavily indebted and with conditions worsening, Scullin and Theodore took many novel steps in an attempt to turn the economy around. Appeals were made, both to the Australian public and on overseas markets, to bolster confidence and boost government bond subscriptions. A "Grow More Wheat" campaign was launched in 1930 to encourage farmers to plant a record crop and attempt to improve Australia's serious trade deficit, although ultimately Scullin was unsuccessful in convincing the Senate or the Commonwealth Bank to support this program through price guarantees. At the same time unemployment had hit a record high of 14.6% in the March quarter of 1930. Scullin's election promise of unemployment insurance was discussed in this period, but with dire predictions for government finance the promise was continually stalled. Scullin made major proposals to change the constitutional amendment process; expand Commonwealth powers over commerce, trade and industry; and to break apart the Commonwealth Bank to separate out its reserve bank and trading bank functions. The Senate blocked them all, or made amendments which rendered them unrecognisable. A double dissolution was threatened, though for various reasons both practical and political, Scullin never took this step. In June 1930 the government suffered a heavy loss when Theodore was forced to resign after he was criticised by a Royal Commission enquiring into a scandal known as the Mungana affair, claims of corrupt deals dating back to Theodore's time as Premier of Queensland. Scullin took over the Treasury portfolio in the interim while Theodore went to Queensland to face charges, and was compelled to bring down the 1930 budget personally.

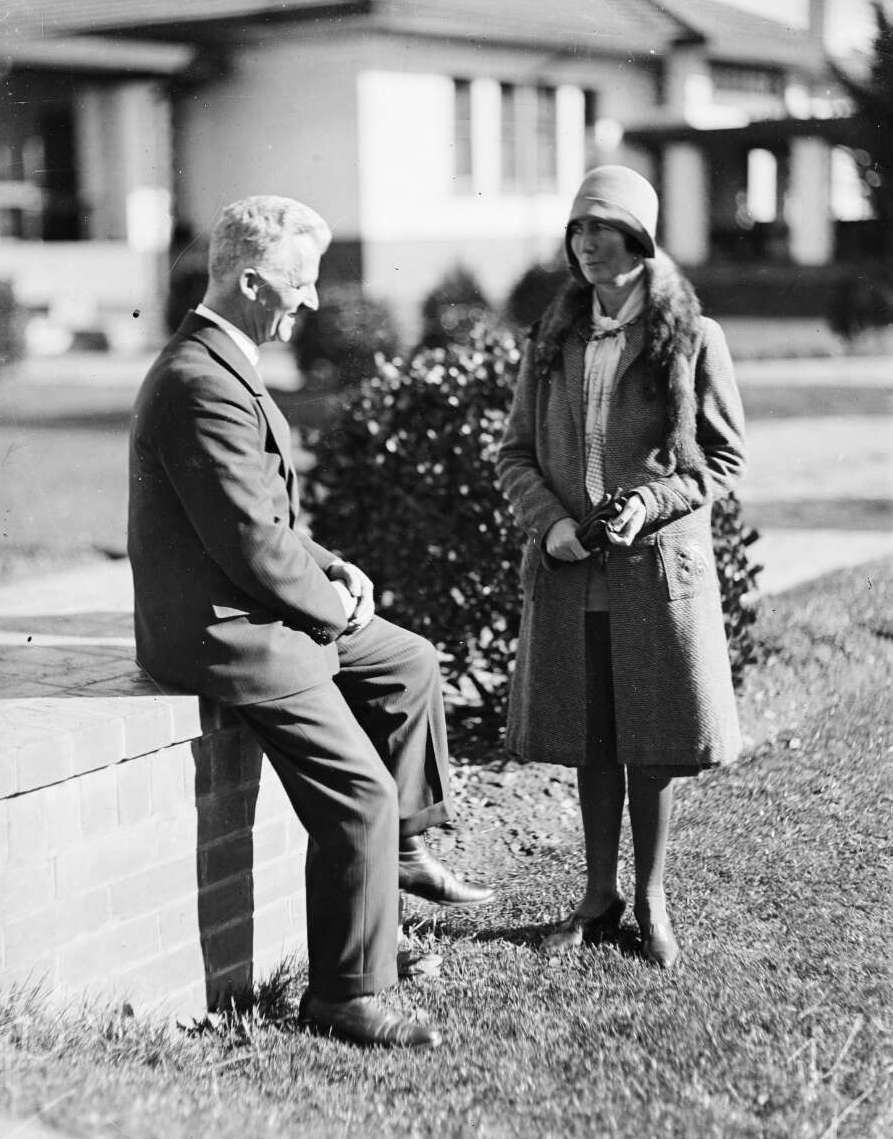
Scullin and his wife Sarah in about 1930

Tarred with the political scandal, the budget, which raised taxes, cut spending and still did not deliver a surplus, was very unpopular with all sections of the community. What is more, the budget proved overly optimistic as Australian revenues continued to plunge and the deficit rose. By August 1930, crisis meetings were held in which Sir Robert Gibson and Sir Otto Niemeyer were demanding further economies in Commonwealth spending. Niemeyer, a representative of the Bank of England, had arrived in Australia to inspect financial conditions on behalf of creditors and had a grim report – that "Australian credit is at a low ebb...lower than that of any of the other dominions" and that without drastic steps default and financial collapse was assured. Gibson agreed, and as chairman of the Commonwealth Bank board had the power to deny the Australian government loans to finance the budget unless more cuts were made by both the national and state governments. After meeting with Scullin and state premiers, the 'Melbourne Agreement' was reluctantly struck in which further major spending cuts were agreed to, although opposed by a significant minority of Scullin's party.

In the heat of this crisis, matters were made worse still by Scullin's decision to travel to London on 25 August 1930 to seek an emergency loan and to attend the Imperial Conference. While in London, Scullin succeeded in gaining loans for Australia at reduced interest. He also succeeded in having King George V appoint Sir Isaac Isaacs as the first Australian-born governor-general of Australia, despite the king's personal opposition and the strong objections of both the British establishment and the conservative opposition in Australia, who attacked the appointment as tantamount to republicanism. However a leadership vacuum was left behind, with Scullin out of the country for the whole second half of 1930, James Fenton (as acting prime minister) and Joseph Lyons (as acting Treasurer) were left in charge. They insisted on pursuing deflationary policies and orthodox solutions to degrading Commonwealth budgetary position, arousing great opposition in the Labor caucus. In regular contact with Fenton and Lyons in London through the awkward means of cables, Scullin felt he had no choice but to agree to the recommendations of economic advisers, supported by Lyons and Fenton, that government spending be heavily cut, despite the suffering this caused and the disillusionment of the Labor party's base, whom were most affected by these cuts. Party unity began to crumble, and the gulf between the moderate and radical wings of the party began to grow.

=== Internal divisions and the Theodore Plan ===
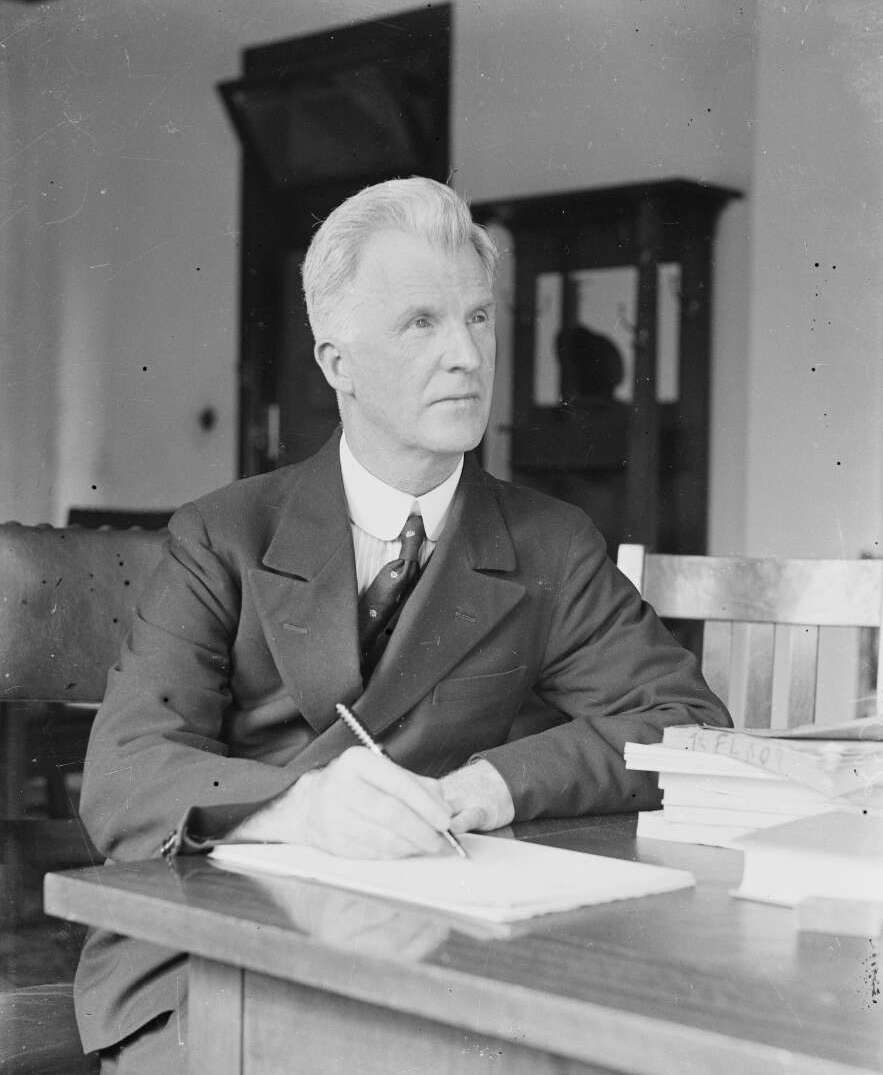
Scullin in 1931

Returning to Australia on 6 January 1931, Scullin was faced with a party now deeply divided over how to respond to the Depression. Jack Lang had won election as Premier of New South Wales and had become a leading alternative voice within Labor, advocating radical measures including repudiation of interest on debts to Britain and printing money to pay for public works programs to relieve unemployment and inflate the currency. The NSW contingent in Federal parliament was sympathetic to Lang's views and had become disillusioned with Scullin's leadership and his compromises with conservative interests. At the first meeting of cabinet upon his return, Scullin made things worse by reappointing Theodore as treasurer, despite his name not having been yet cleared over the Mungana Affair. Although arguably Theodore was the most competent man available to implement Scullin's economic program, Lyons and Fenton (as well as several others) were strongly opposed and resigned from the cabinet in protest. Making matters worse, Theodore had become a fierce personal rival of Lang within the New South Wales branch, and his return as treasurer further isolated radical elements of the party. At the same time, the economy had continued to decline and unemployment had soared, with most of the government measures designed to combat the crisis still in limbo due to opposition either from the Senate or refusal of funding by the Commonwealth Bank.

In February Scullin and Theodore presented a comprehensive plan at a conference of the state premiers that attempted to straddle both orthodox and radical approaches. While maintaining heavy budgetary cuts, it also planned to provide economic stimulus to help the unemployed and farmers, as well as repaying short-term debts and overdrafts held by British banks. This would require substantial further funds to be advanced by the Commonwealth Bank, however Gibson soon made it clear he would not do so unless significant cuts to social spending (particularly pensions) was also implemented. Scullin refused, instead planning to pay for the plan through the expanding the note issue. This 'Theodore Plan' was approved by narrow majorities of the state premiers and then the parliamentary party. However, Jack Lang rejected the plan, stating instead that Australia should default on its British debts until more equitable repayment terms were agreed to. Lyons and the conservatives within the party were horrified, as were the Opposition, seeing note issue as a sure path to hyperinflation and complete economic ruin.

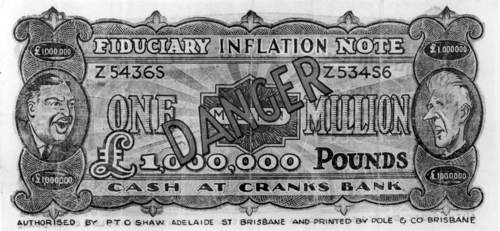
A cartoon criticising Scullin and Theodore's inflationary financing plans

In March matters came to a head. The 1931 East Sydney by-election saw Eddie Ward elected on a specifically pro-Lang platform, and the bitter campaign within the seat saw federal Labor and NSW Labor mutually expel each other from the party. Scullin and the Federal party refused to admit Ward to the caucus, and subsequently Jack Beasley led five others out of the party room to sit on the cross-benches as "Lang Labor". With chaos in Labor ranks and parliament facing a highly controversial plan for economic rehabilitation, the Opposition presented a motion of no confidence. Lyons, Fenton and four others on the conservative wing resigned from Labor and crossed over to the opposition benches. Scullin was reduced to a minority government of just 35 members, depending on the Lang faction to stay in power. Having built a large and popular following among the public, Lyons and his ex-Labor followers joined the Nationalists and the erstwhile followers of Hughes in United Australia Party, with Lyons becoming the new Leader of the Opposition. With a possible default by the Commonwealth looming in June, Scullin's minority government attempted to push through the Theodore Plan. Although under pressure given the prospect of bankruptcy, the Senate and Gibson did not relent, and nearly all the bills needed to implement the Theodore Plan were rejected. Nationwide opinion was divided on the government plan, however many were extremely concerned about the prospect of excessive inflation should the government start printing money to pay its bills.

=== Premiers' Plan and downfall ===
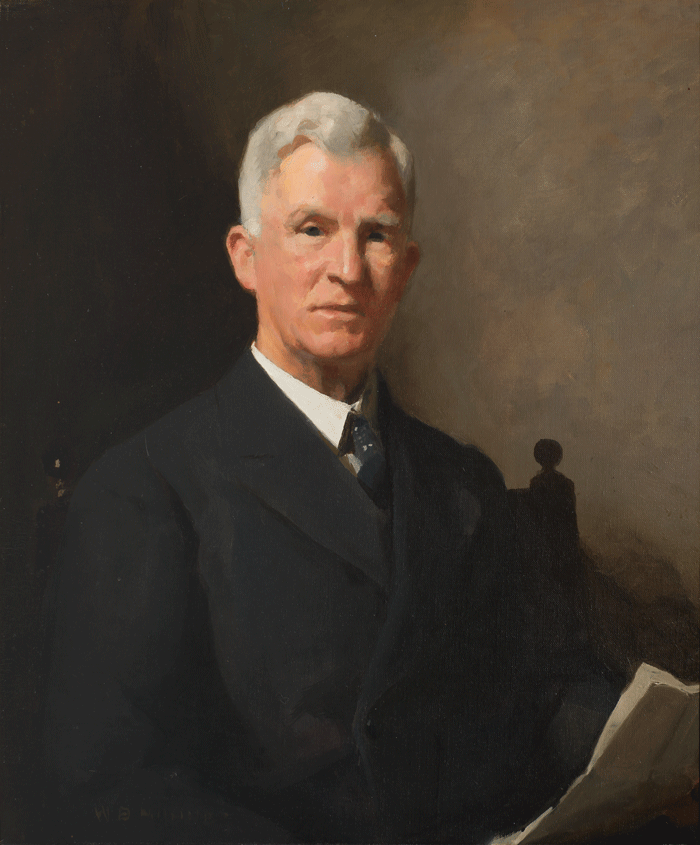
Parliament House portrait of Scullin by William Beckwith McInnes, 1938

Now May, with unemployment at 27.6% widespread suffering across much of the population, Scullin called another conference of the state premiers to try and forge a new deal, now resigned to the fact that compromise with the Opposition was inevitable if any plan could be implemented. A new orthodox plan calling for 20% reductions in spending across the board for all governments was struck, and such cuts to also apply to social welfare spending. Combined with a mass loan conversion that would reduce the interest rates paid on government bonds by 22.5%, Australia now had a consensus as to how to reduce the annual deficit from some £41.08m to £14.65m. Although he had finally secured parliamentary and state approval for a plan, Scullin now faced a revolt from his own party. Cuts to pensions and the poor were particularly hard for Scullin, and many core Labor supporters felt deeply betrayed by this compromise of society's most vulnerable groups. Scullin ardently defend the program, but Lang's influence as an alternative opinion leader of Labor was growing, now with state branches in Victoria and South Australia rebelling against the Premiers' Plan.

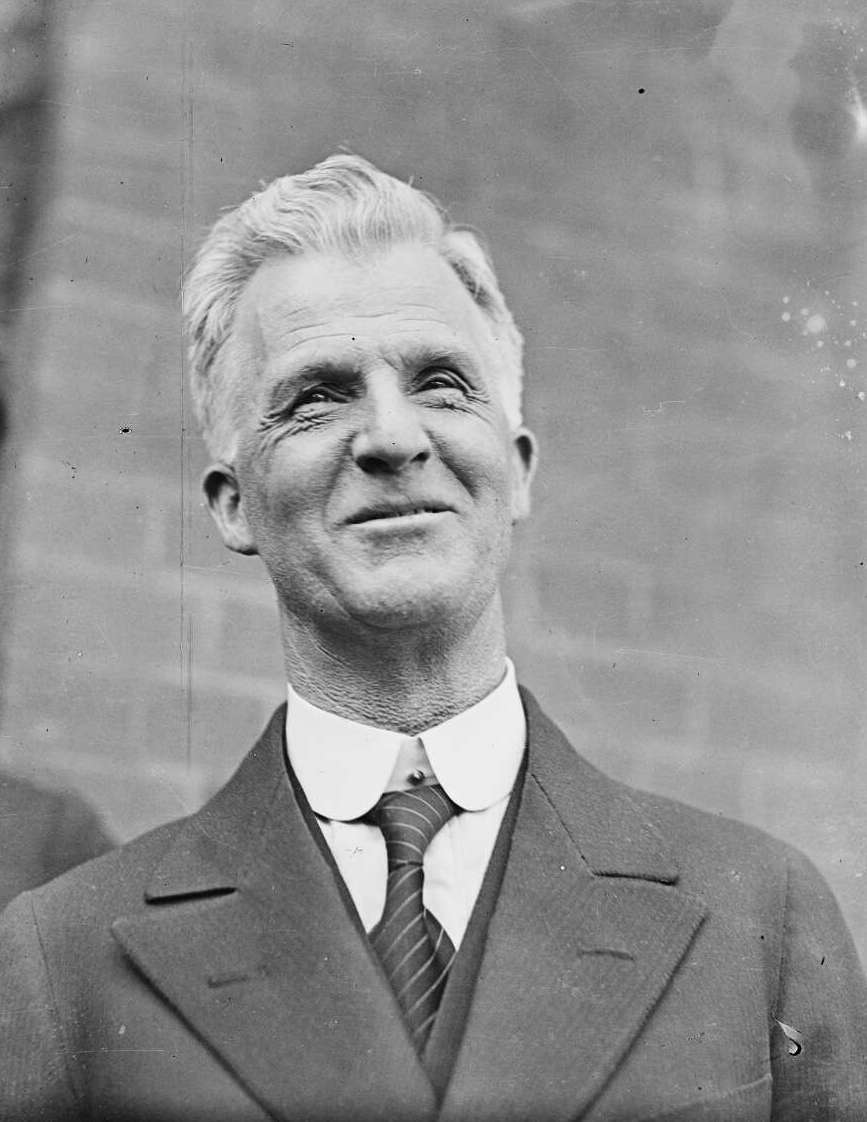
Scullin on the day he handed the reins of power to Joseph Lyons, January 1932

Traumatic as it was, the government finally now was implementing an economic plan, and things began to improve. Domestic confidence, and confidence in the British loan market, began to recover and default was averted. Voluntary acceptance of lower bond rates on government debt had been extremely successful in a patriotic campaign, wool and wheat prices finally began to rise, and government finances at both Commonwealth and state level were largely under control by October. But with unemployment still rising (it would not peak until 1932), Scullin still faced disillusionment from many within his party, and further gains in ground by Lang. Lang felt threatened by the apparent success of the Premier's Plan though, and renewed talks of unity between the factions had appeared with the improvement of economic conditions. Lang Labor subsequently forced a showdown with the Scullin government in November. With allegations arising that Theodore had abused his position as treasurer to buy support in New South Wales away from the Lang faction, Beasley and his followers called for a royal commission into the charges. Scullin refused. To the surprise of many observers, the Beasley group crossed the floor to join the Opposition, thereby defeating the government. A snap poll, the 1931 election, was called. Scullin for the first time in Australian politics made heavy use of the radio to reach voters. The campaign was one of the shortest in history, but with open warfare between pro-Lang and pro-Scullin forces in Victoria and New South Wales, and much of the country still facing hardship and grievances against the government, a Labor defeat was virtually assured. Labor was defeated in a massive landslide. The official Labor Party was reduced to a mere 14 seats (Lang Labor won another 4), and Lyons became prime minister. However, Scullin was not held responsible for the debacle and stayed on as Labor leader. To date, it is the last time that a sitting Australian government has been defeated after a single term.

== Later career ==
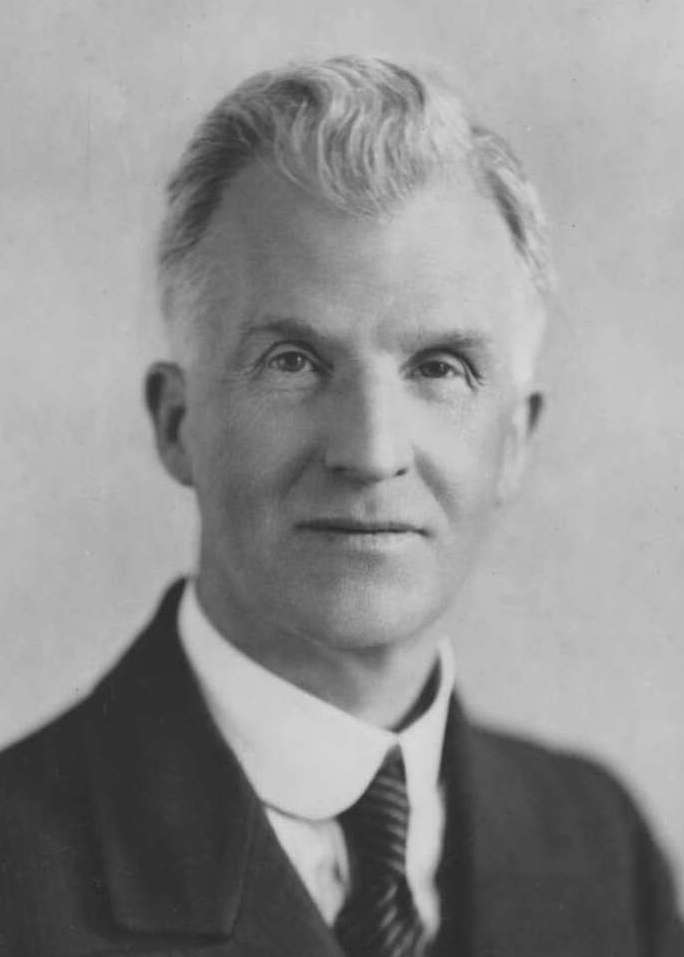
Scullin as Opposition leader in 1932

The heavy task of leading the country through the brunt of the Great Depression, beset as he was by many enemies and few friends, left deep marks on Scullin's character. As one Country Party parliamentarian observed, "the great burden that was imposed upon him then almost killed him". Scullin won much praise for his performance as Opposition Leader, as he had before coming prime minister. His grasp of economic and trade matters was still formidable, and he succeeded in forcing some changes to government policy, even banding with the Country Party to force amendments to government legislation.

However, failed attempts to reunite the party, and dislodge Lang as an alternative Labor voice, left the ALP at a distinct disadvantage in the lead-up to the 1934 election. Ultimately, the implementation of the Premiers' Plan by Scullin and his Commonwealth supporters was too much of a betrayal for many to accept, and the opposing Lang and Scullin factions continued to plague Labor politics in NSW and Victoria for years. The 1934 election proved to be a dispiriting defeat for Scullin. Despite an admirable and vigorous term as opposition leader, Labor gained just four seats, and actually suffered a small swing against it. Both Labor and the UAP lost ground to Lang Labor, which gained five seats on a swing of almost 4%.

Although confirmed as Opposition Leader after the 1934 election, Scullin markedly declined in vigour in his role. Tired of the infighting, he took little part in the renewed conciliation talks between the opposition party wings, which failed to resolve the entrenched divide between the Lang and anti-Lang forces. Scullin had stated his intention to remain leader until he could be sure he would not be succeeded by the Lang forces at the federal level, but fate intervened and Scullin's health, always middling, declined significantly in 1935. Bedridden several times, he tendered his resignation as Labor leader on 23 September 1935, citing a physical inability to continue.

By the time of his resignation, Australia's economy had recovered significantly and business confidence had returned to a large extent. The belligerent actions of Japan in China, and then Germany in Europe, began to overtake the economy as the predominant concern of Australian politics. Scullin was succeeded as Labor leader by John Curtin, who proved a necessary salve to the party's wounds. Under Curtin's leadership, most of the Lang Labor faction returned to the party, though Lang and some supporters remained obdurate. During those years, Scullin was far quieter on the backbench, only occasionally taking an active role in parliament, though still closely involved his seat of Yarra. He was a passionate advocate for the arts and, with the Fellowship of Australian Writers, was responsible for a dramatic boost to the budget of the Commonwealth Literary Fund in 1939.

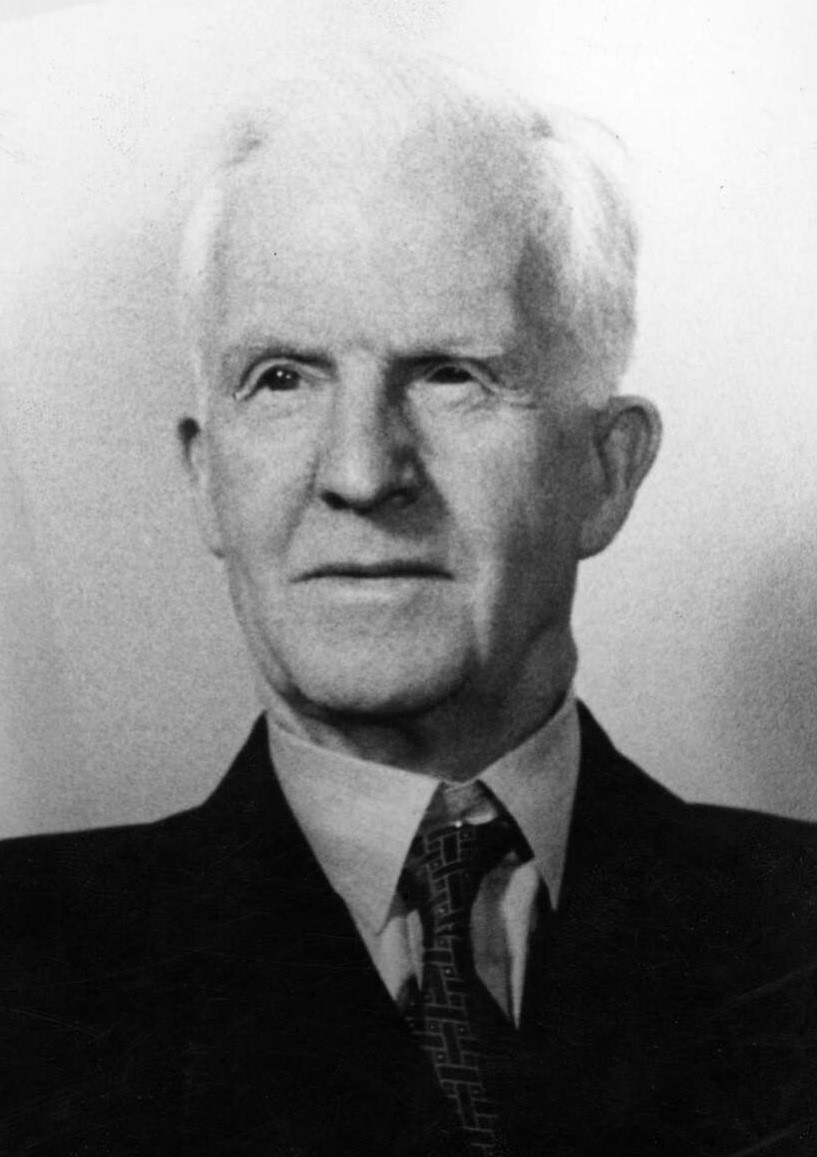
Scullin during the 1940s

In 1941, after two independents joined Labor in voting down the UAP government's budget, Curtin became prime minister. He came to rely on Scullin greatly for his counsel. Scullin took no portfolio, and played no part in military strategy or the overall war effort, except where finance was concerned. However, he was given an office between those of Curtin and Treasurer Ben Chifley, and his advice had a significant bearing on the policy and political tactics of the Curtin government. In the ALP caucus, Scullin was a leading voice in support of the new PM, urging members to get out of the way of Curtin, rather than obstructing, as many had done during his prime ministership.

To Scullin's delight, a battery of social welfare and economic policies, so long out of reach for Labor governments, finally became law during the war. He continued to be a leading voice in favour of broad social welfare schemes, and was influential in formulating many of the Curtin and, later, Chifley government's social policies. Another of Scullin's long-held ambitions, the replacement of the federal structure in favour of a unitary state, was partially advanced when he was appointed as one of three on a committee to recommend means of implementing uniform taxation. That committee proposed eliminating the ability of state governments to levy income tax, a proposal which Curtin accepted. That move greatly weakened the federal system by increasing the fiscal dependence of the states on the Commonwealth. Scullin's committee work was prominent again in 1944, when he led the move to change the tax code to allow a pay-as-you-go system, which was implemented by the Curtin government.

Ill-health continued to return in bouts, but Scullin remained active in parliament, if subdued, after Curtin's death and Chifley's succession to the prime ministership in 1945. Scullin continued to be influential in fiscal and taxation matters, and the impact of his experience was still occasionally felt in Chifley-era legislation. However, his health declined significantly in 1947, and he did not appear in parliament again after June of that year, announcing he would retire at the 1949 election.

=== Death and funeral ===
Grave of James and Sarah Scullin at Melbourne General Cemetery

Scullin was frequently bedridden in his last 18 months, and was unable to attend many gatherings. His condition deteriorated further after retirement. He suffered cardio-renal failure in 1951 and became almost permanently bedridden, under the care of his wife.

Scullin died in his sleep on 28 January 1953, in Hawthorn, Melbourne, from complications arising from pulmonary edema. He was accorded a state funeral in St Patrick's Cathedral, Melbourne, with the Requiem Mass presided over by Archbishop Daniel Mannix. He was buried in the Catholic section of Melbourne General Cemetery. Over his grave the federal Labor executive and the ACTU erected a monument on behalf of the Labor movement of Australia. The inscription reads: "Justice and humanity demand interference whenever the weak are being crushed by the strong." Scullin's wife, Sarah, was interred with him in 1962. Labor stalwarts Arthur Calwell, Esmond Kiernan, Herbert Cremean and Edward Grayndler are all buried adjacent to the Scullin plot.

== Legacy ==
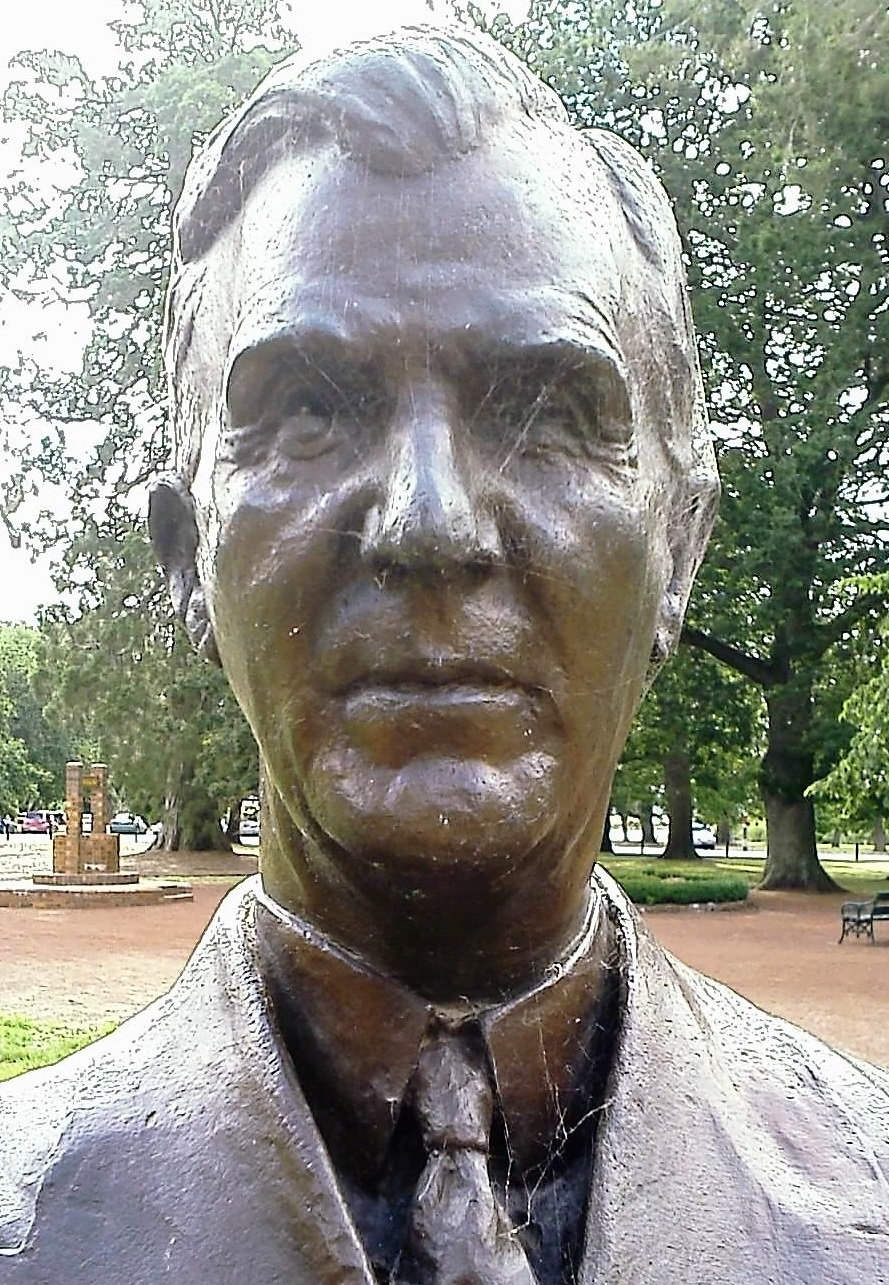
Bust of James Scullin located in the Ballarat Botanical Gardens

Scullin had defended his record in government throughout his later career, and took pride in having been prime minister in times which might have broken a lesser figure. However he lived long enough to see many of his economic ideas vindicated by history, particularly inflationary financing, which was quite radical by the standards of his times but an accepted pillar of Keynesian economics adopted by Australia and most other Western governments in the late 1930s and 1940s. Indeed, John Maynard Keynes himself would state of Scullin's Premier's Plan which caused him so much woe and electoral unpopularity that it "saved the economic structure of Australia". The Economist admitted after the 1931 election that Scullin "had already done much to place Australia on the high road to recovery".

Several measures which had been proposed and defeated by the UAP opposition (particularly on gold shipments for loan repayments) were subsequently reintroduced and passed by the UAP once in government, giving Scullin some satisfaction. Furthermore, Scullin consoled himself with the fact that the Depression destroyed most of the political careers of those who occupied government through it – only one Australian premier won re-election from 1927 to 1935, and Scullin's foreign contemporaries Herbert Hoover (in the United States of America), Ramsay MacDonald (United Kingdom), Richard Bennett (Canada) and George Forbes (New Zealand) all suffered similarly devastating elections in the wake of the depression. In 1951, 114 manufacturers in Melbourne donated to a fund for Scullin's retirement. Having not forgotten his advocacy of tariffs during their height of unpopularity in the depression, several companies went as far to state that Scullin's efforts had "commenced a new era in the secondary industry field in Australia" and that the success of Australia's wartime industry was due to Scullin's protection of industry during its most vulnerable period a decade earlier.

Scullin's years following his term of government also proved fruitful – he exerted a surprising amount of influence over government policy as Opposition Leader. Scullin was for decades the foremost expert in the Australian parliament on taxation and a variety of other fiscal matters, a fact which rendered his advice very influential within the Curtin government and many of his ideas, having been denied during his own term of government, would eventually be enshrined in the wave of sweeping reforms made by the Curtin/Chifley governments. Scullin was a well-respected figure in politics. Although the target of much bile and disagreement over his policies, he was personally extremely well regarded and had a reputation as a fearless and stoic leader of great personal integrity and fortitude. His resignation as leader in 1935 caused even longtime critic Jack Beasley to admit that Scullin was "a fearless fighter in the exposition of what he believes to be the right course".

Scullin, Australian Capital Territory, a suburb of Canberra, is named after him, as is the Division of Scullin, a House of Representatives electorate. The Scullin monolith in Antarctica was also named in his honour.

== See also ==
- Scullin Ministry
- Peace movements in Australia

== Bibliography ==
Books

- Alexander, Fred (1982). Australia Since Federation: A Narrative and Critical Analysis (Updated ed.). West Melbourne, Victoria: Nelson. ISBN 978-0-17-005861-2.
- Bastian, Peter (2009). Andrew Fisher: An Underestimated Man. Sydney, NSW: UNSW Press. ISBN 978-1-74223-004-7.
- Byrne, Liam (2020). Becoming John Curtin and James Scullin: The Making of the Modern Labor Party. Melbourne University Press. ISBN 9780522876482.
- Carroll, Brian (2004). Australia's Prime Ministers: From Barton to Howard (Revised ed.). Dural, NSW: Rosenberg Publishing. ISBN 978-1-877058-22-6.
- Denning, Warren (1982) [1937]. Caucus Crisis: The Rise & Fall of the Scullin Government. Sydney, New South Wales: Hale & Iremonger. ISBN 978-0-908094-92-9.
- Denning, Warren; Moorhouse, Frank (2000). James Scullin: Prime Minister of Australia, 1929–1932 (2nd ed.). Black Incorporated. ISBN 978-1-86395-242-2.
- Maddox, Graham (1978), "Australian Labor Party", in Starr, Graeme; Richmond, Keith; Maddox, Graham (eds.), Political Parties in Australia, Richmond, Victoria: Heinemann Educational Australia
- Murray, Robert (1970). The Confident Years: Australia in the Twenties. London: Allen Lane. ISBN 978-0-7139-1155-8.
- Robertson, John (1974). J. H. Scullin: A Political Biography. Nedlands, Western Australia: University of Western Australia Press. ISBN 978-0-85564-074-3.
- Schedvin, C. B. (1989). Australia and the Great Depression. Sydney, New South Wales: Sydney University Press. ISBN 978-0-424-06660-8.
- Shann, E. O. G. (1927). The Boom of 1890 – and Now. Sydney, New South Wales: Cornstalk.
- Souter, Gavin (1988). Acts of Parliament: A Narrative History of the Senate and House of Representatives. Carlton, Victoria: Melbourne University Press. ISBN 978-0-522-84367-5.

Periodicals

- Byrne, Liam (2019). "The Electoral Poetics of James Scullin's Campaign against Alfred Deakin, 1906: Anticipating 'Fusion'". Australian Journal of Politics and History. 65 (2): 163–177. doi:10.1111/ajph.12564. hdl:11343/286860.
- Cook, Peter. "Labor and the Premiers' Plan." Labour History (1969): 97–110. in JSTOR
- Head, Brian. "Economic crisis and political legitimacy: the 1931 federal election." Journal of Australian Studies (1978) 2#3 pp: 14–29. online
- Richardson, Nick. "The 1931 Australian Federal Election – Radio Makes History." Historical Journal of Film, Radio and Television (2010) 30#3 pp: 377–389. doi:10.1080/01439685.2010.505037
- Roberts, Stephen H. "The Crisis in Australia: September, 1930–January, 1932." Pacific Affairs (1932) 5#4 pp: 319–332. in JSTOR
- Robinson, Geoff. "The Australian class structure and Australian politics 1931–40." APSA 2008: Australasian Political Science Association 2008 Conference. Australasian Political Science Association, 2008. online Archived 3 March 2016 at the Wayback Machine
- Robertson, J. R. "Scullin as Prime Minister: seven critical decisions." Labour History (1969): 27–36. in JSTOR
- Commonwealth of Australia, Parliamentary Debates, Canberra, ACT: House of Representatives

Unpublished

- Barber, Stephen (2011), Federal Election Results, 1901–2010, Parliamentary Library Research Papers, Canberra, ACT: Department of the Parliamentary Library

Online

- Cook, Peter Sydney. "The Scullin Government, 1929-1932" (PhD Dissertation, The Australian National University; ProQuest Dissertations & Theses, 1971. 28820451)
- "James Scullin, Prime Ministers of Australia". Canberra, ACT: National Archives of Australia. Archived from the original on 22 January 2013.
- "James Henry Scullin (1876–1953)". Scullin, James Henry (1876–1953). Canberra, ACT: Australian Dictionary of Biography.
- "By-Elections 1919–22". Melbourne, Victoria: Adam Carr's Election Database.
- "James Scullin: Depression Treasurer" (PDF). Canberra, ACT: Treasury of Australia. Archived from the original (PDF) on 3 April 2013.

Parliament of Australia
| Preceded by John Gratton Wilson | Member for Corangamite; 1910–1913 | Succeeded by Chester Manifold |
| Preceded by Frank Tudor | Member for Yarra; 1922–1949 | Succeeded by Stan Keon |
Political offices
| Preceded by Matthew Charlton | Leader of the Opposition; 1928–1929 | Succeeded by John Latham |
| Preceded by Stanley Bruce | Prime Minister of Australia; 1929–1931 | Succeeded by Joseph Lyons |
| Preceded by Billy Hughes | Minister for External Affairs; 1929–1932 | Succeeded by John Latham |
| Preceded by John Latham | Minister for Industry; 1929–1932 | Succeeded by John Latham |
| Preceded by Ted Theodore | Treasurer of Australia; 1930–1931 | Succeeded by Ted Theodore |
| Preceded by Joseph Lyons | Leader of the Opposition; 1932–1935 | Succeeded by John Curtin |
Party political offices
| Preceded by Albert Gardiner | Deputy Leader of the Labor Party; 1927–1928 | Succeeded by Arthur Blakeley |
| Preceded by Matthew Charlton | Leader of the Australian Labor Party; 1928–1935 | Succeeded by John Curtin |
