= Sarah Scullin =

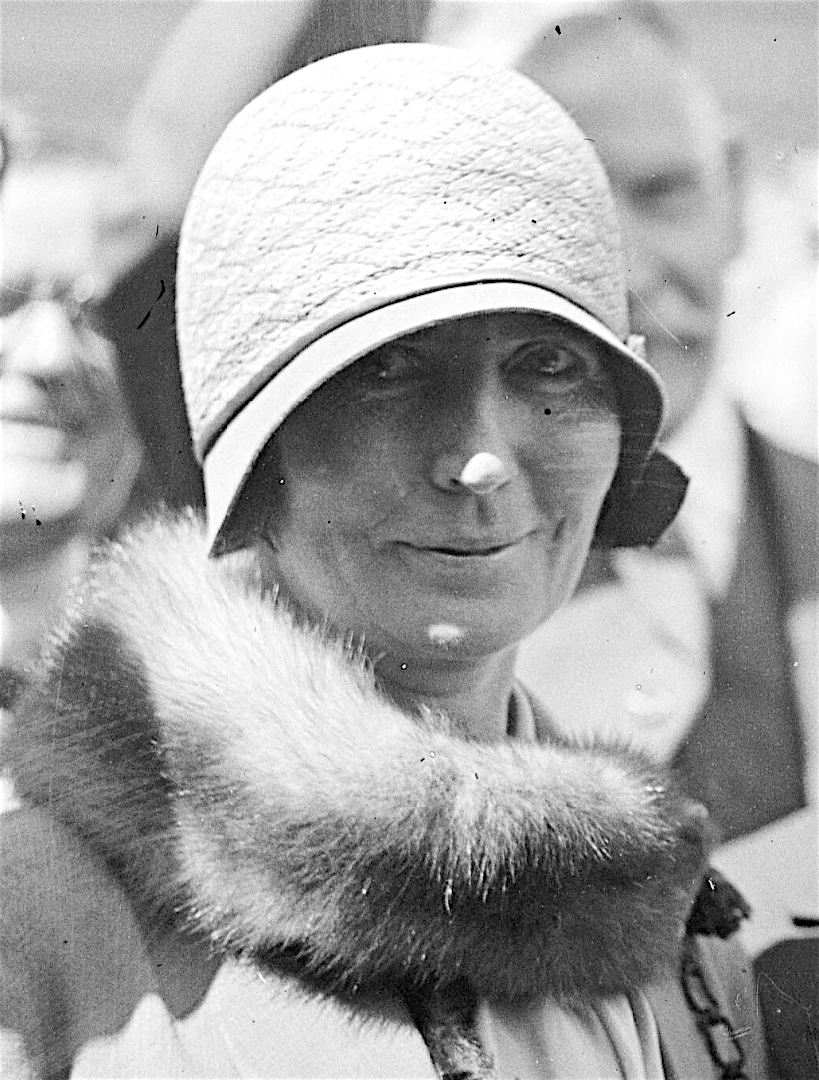

Spouse of the Prime Minister of Australia
- In role 22 October 1929 – 6 January 1932
- Preceded by: Ethel Bruce
- Succeeded by: Enid Lyons

Personal details
- Born: 21 April 1880 Ballarat, Victoria, Australia
- Died: 31 May 1962 (aged 82) Kew, Victoria, Australia
- Resting place: Melbourne General Cemetery
- Spouse: James Scullin (m. 1907; died 1953)

Sarah Maria Scullin (née McNamara; 21 April 1880 – 31 May 1962) was the wife of James Scullin, the 9th Prime Minister of Australia.

== Early life and marriage ==
Scullin was born in Ballarat, Victoria, to Sarah (née Simcocks) and Michael McNamara. Her mother was born in County Kerry, Ireland, and her father was born in Bodyke, County Clare. She was educated at local Catholic schools, and was known as a skilled dressmaker and a talented artist. She married James Scullin at St Patrick's Cathedral, Ballarat, on 11 November 1907. The couple had no children.

== Public life ==
Scullin accompanied her husband on his election campaigns, but did not make speeches herself. According to his biographer John Robertson, she was "significant politically in an indirect manner, for she provided a serene domestic haven as a base for her husband's political activities". When her husband became prime minister in 1929, the couple chose to live in the Hotel Canberra rather than The Lodge, as an economy during the Great Depression. She nursed him during his bouts of ill health, and during the four-hour "sickroom cabinet" meeting of August 1930 "stood guard at the door, refusing entrance to all unwanted visitors".

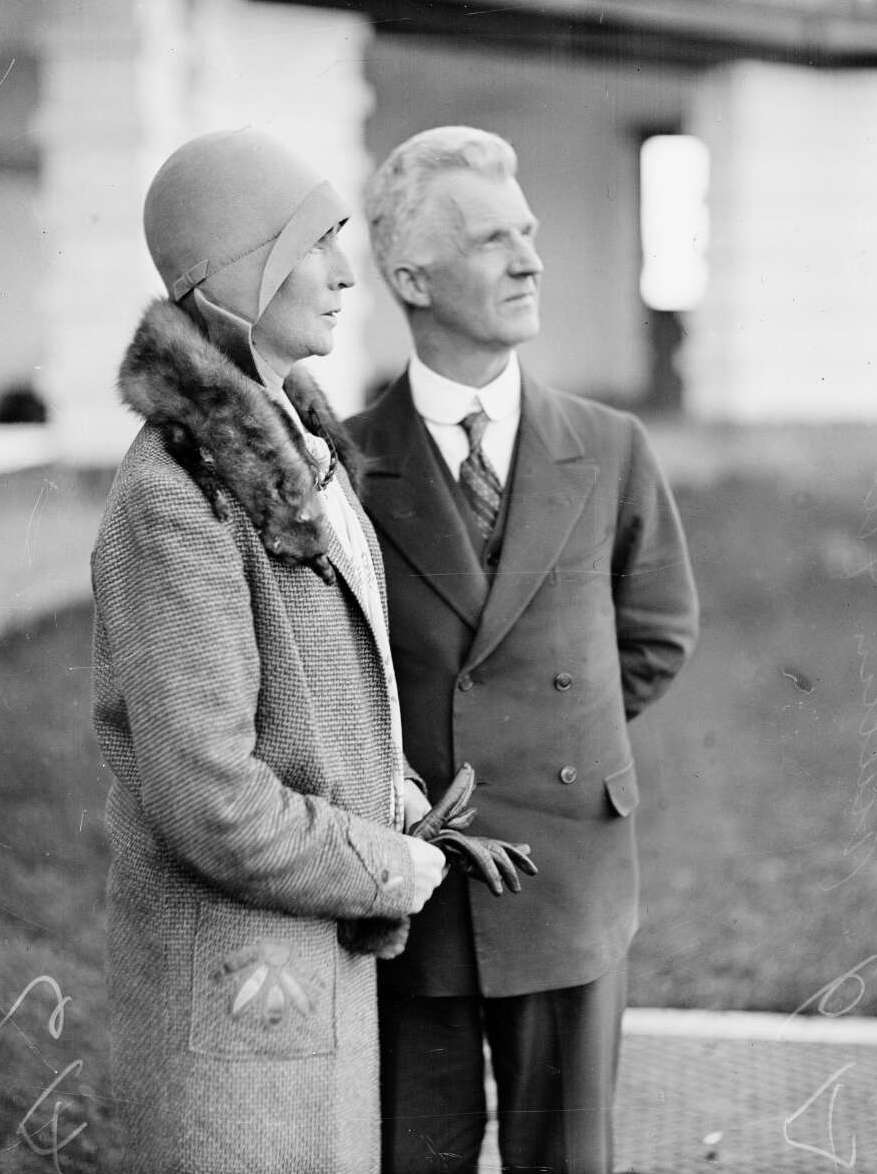
Sarah and James Scullin, c. 1930

== Later life ==
Scullin was widowed in January 1953. Her husband had been seriously ill and frequently bed-ridden for about two years, during which she was his primary caregiver. She died at their house on Park Avenue, Kew, in May 1962, aged 82. She was buried alongside her husband in the Catholic section of Melbourne General Cemetery.

Honorary titles
Preceded by Ethel Bruce	Spouse of the Prime Minister of Australia; 22 March 1929 – 6 January 1932	Succeeded by Enid Lyons
