= Philip Harmer =

Australian architect

Philip Harmer is an Australian architect. He graduated from the University of Melbourne with a bachelor's degree in Architecture, and became a Fellow of the Royal Australian Institute of Architects (RAIA). Harmer has a strong appreciation for sculptural forms and spaces that are powerfully shaped or wrought; thus, his works display the cleverness of how certain materials and details are used to represent his individual persona.

== Personal life ==
Before Harmer enrolled in the Architecture program, he had worked for Yuncken Freeman Architects. After graduating, he spent a few years working for Sidell Gibson Partnership Architects and JR Harris Architects in the United Kingdom.after which he developed his own company called Harmer Architecture in Collingwood, Australia. up to 2011 his company has won 17 RAIA awards and commendations for design excellence Harmer also holds a CASA private pilots license.

Harmer Architecture won the RAIA regional prize for the Esso BHP Billiton Wellington Entertainment Center in Sale, Victoria, Australia in 2004. With the aim to win this prize, their projects had to make noteworthy contributions to regional Victoria. Thus, their success led the jury to announce the importance of their development for the people of Sale. The jury also acknowledged that the company had, "…responded beyond the brief to provide an urban building that opens vistas and routes from the main road through to the historic but neglected Port of Sale."

== Notable projects ==
- Gatehouse Mausoleum, RAIA Award for Institutional Alterations and Extensions

== Altona Meadows/Laverton Uniting Church 1993 ==
In 1993, Harmer won his second RAIA award with the development of the monumental Altona Meadows/Laverton Uniting Church. The design of the building was inspired from an aircraft hangar because of the recognition of the aviation industry in Melbourne. The six curve-shaped iron pieces supports the main part of the building in which, "The curved roof form has been chosen for functional and economic reasons [where] the principal worship space is located centrally under the highest part of the roof with the secondary spaces grouped at each end..." There are also movable walls inside the building, which can create more open or closed spaces. According to Goad, Harmer's choice of using bold shapes, strong colors and graphic structural expressions allows one to travel back to the structural-functional era when churches reflected postwar liturgical advances.

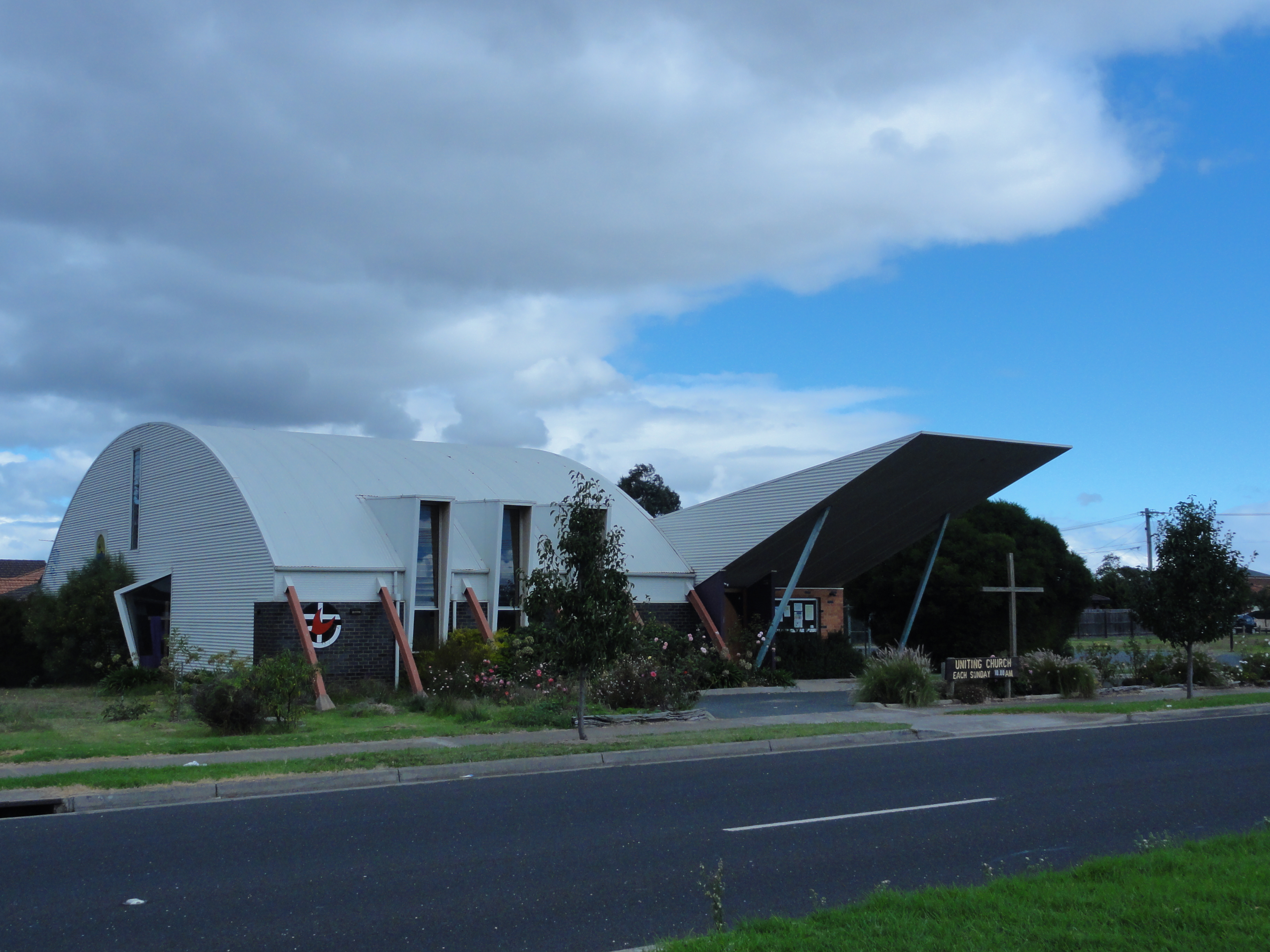
Laverton Uniting Church in Altona Meadows, Australia

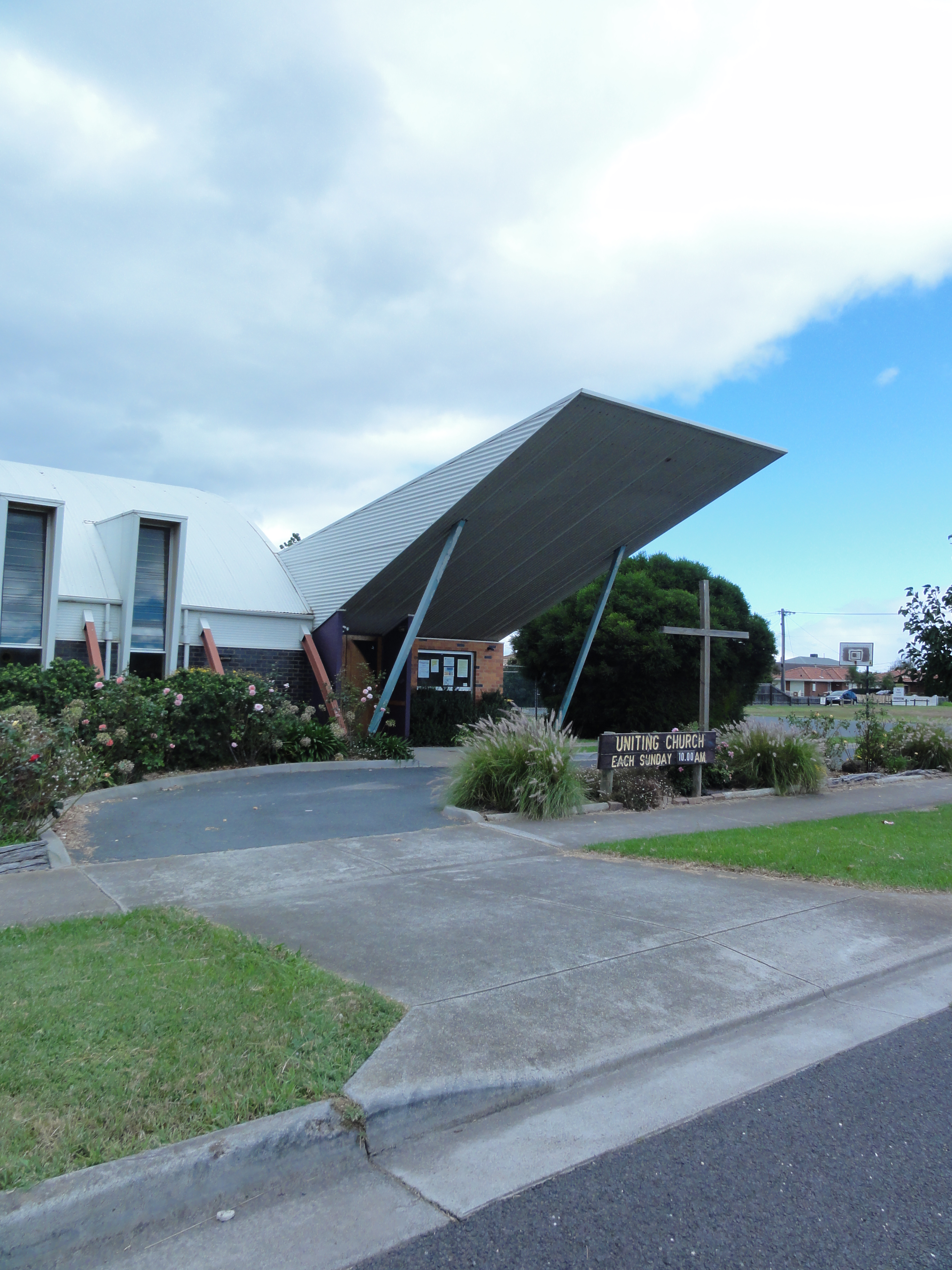
Laverton Uniting Church in Altona Meadows, Australia

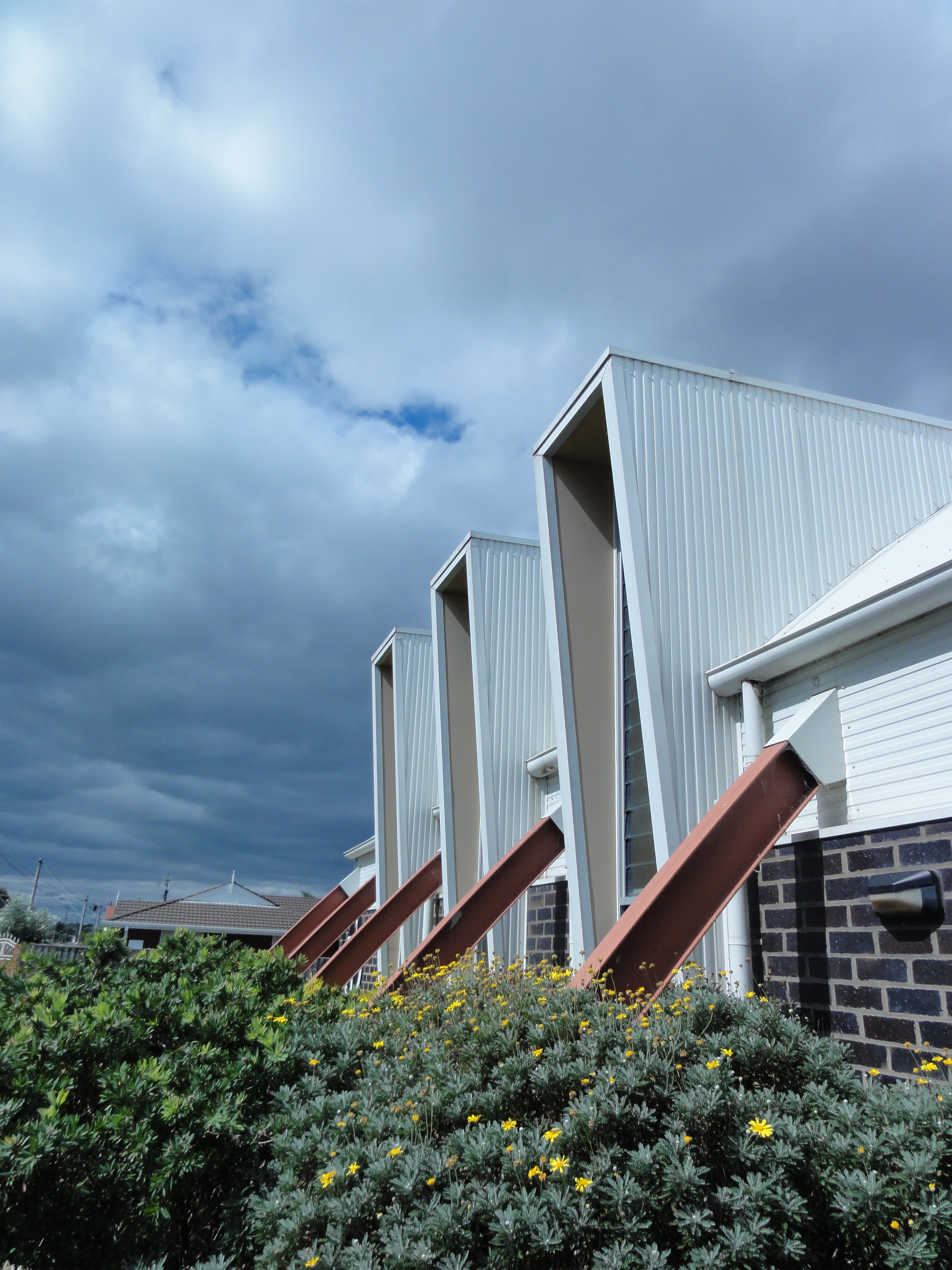
Laverton Uniting Church in Altona Meadows, Australia

== Wedge House 1999 ==
After building the Wedge House in 1999, Harmer Architecture received both the Commendation for Outstanding Architecture award from the RAIA and the Winner Wools of New Zealand award from Interior Design Awards. Wedge House is one of Melbourne's narrowest buildings with only 1.8 meters in width and 16 meters in length. The major materials used were concrete and rubber, but stainless steel linings and ionized copper sheets were also used for the main entrance door and windows. Rollo mentioned that "The two-storey house responds to the shape of the wedge in both plan and elevation [and] its design almost reflects seamlessly to a streetscape of two-storey and single-storey Victorian homes and buildings."

This project recognizes Harmer's hard work in challenging himself to construct a magnificent piece of architecture that is not only remarkable, but also practical enough to ensure that no space is wasted. For example, the office area is separated from the main bedroom by wardrobes, cupboards, and storage. The kitchen and bathroom are located on the narrowest ends of the first and ground floor; however, the free-standing stair wall would create an open slit between the floors making it appear more spacious. An interesting feature about this house is that the dining bench is built into one of the walls. Finally, the widest end of the first floor was made into a living room because the large glass walls that open to the west and south brings views of the city for family and friends to enjoy.

The Wedge House is currently home to an architect from one of Melbourne's leading architectural practices and his collection of bikes.

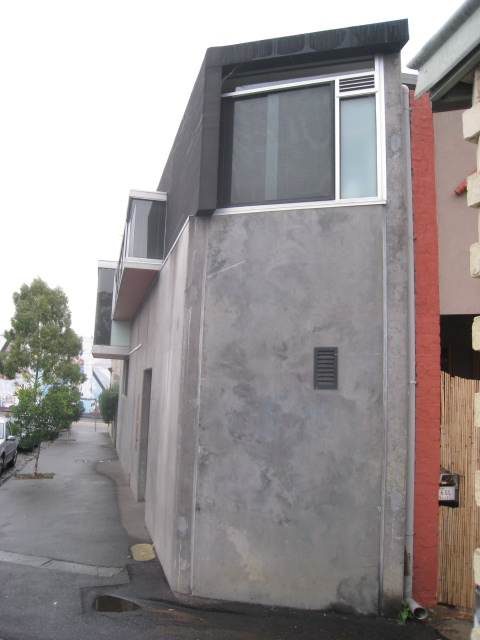
Wedge House in Clifton Hill, Australia

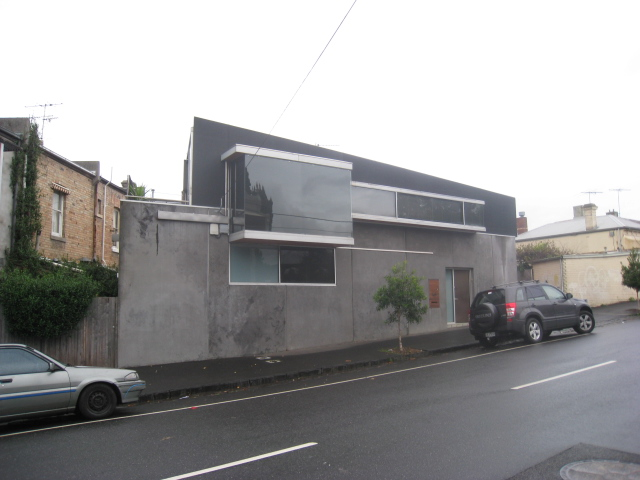
Wedge House in Clifton Hill, Australia

== Darebin Arts & Entertainment Center 1995 ==
The Darebin Arts & Entertainment Center was built with different parts to represent unique themes and functions of a variety of different programs. Therefore, this entertainment center can be used for multi purposes such as using it as a place for festivities or simply as a theater. It is worthwhile to mention that "...the saw tooth roofs of the meeting rooms and studios refer to the industrial history of Preston [and the] theater is expressed as a colonnade of concrete fins from which the auditorium is suspended. This entertainment center was built along the axis running in the north–south direction on the site. The axis of the plan is designed on a 9 meter by 9 meter grid with arrangements of keeping the car park in mind. In addition, the axis is connecting to the Municipal Gardens behind the building.

== Awards ==
- 2006 Luciano Rossettimausoleum:RAIA Architecture Award, Institutional Category
- 2005 Gatehouse Mausoleum: RAIA Architecture Award, Institutional Alterations and Extensions Category
- 2005 Fawkner Admin Building: RAIA Architecture Award, Commercial New Category
- 2004 Sale Theater: RAIA Regional Prize 2004, Commendation IDAA Awards 2005, Public/Institutional Interior Design
- 2003 Budd ST. Office: 3 RAIA Architecture Awards, Commercial New Category, Interior Category; Major Sponsors Award; Best Corporate Interior IDAA Awards 2004
- 2002 Evelyn County Estate: RAIA Architecture Award, Interior Category
- 1999 Wedge House: RAIA Commendation for Outstanding Architecture, Interior Design Awards, Winner Wools of New Zealand
- 1996 Darebin Arts Centre: RAIA Merit Award for Outstanding Architecture
- 1994 Funeral Parlour: RAIA Commendation for Outstanding Architecture
- 1993 Altona Church: RAIA Merit Award for Outstanding Architecture
- 1987 Melton Uniting Church RAIA Merit Award for Outstanding Architecture
