= Mary Hughes =

First Lady of Australia

Dame Mary Hughes GBE
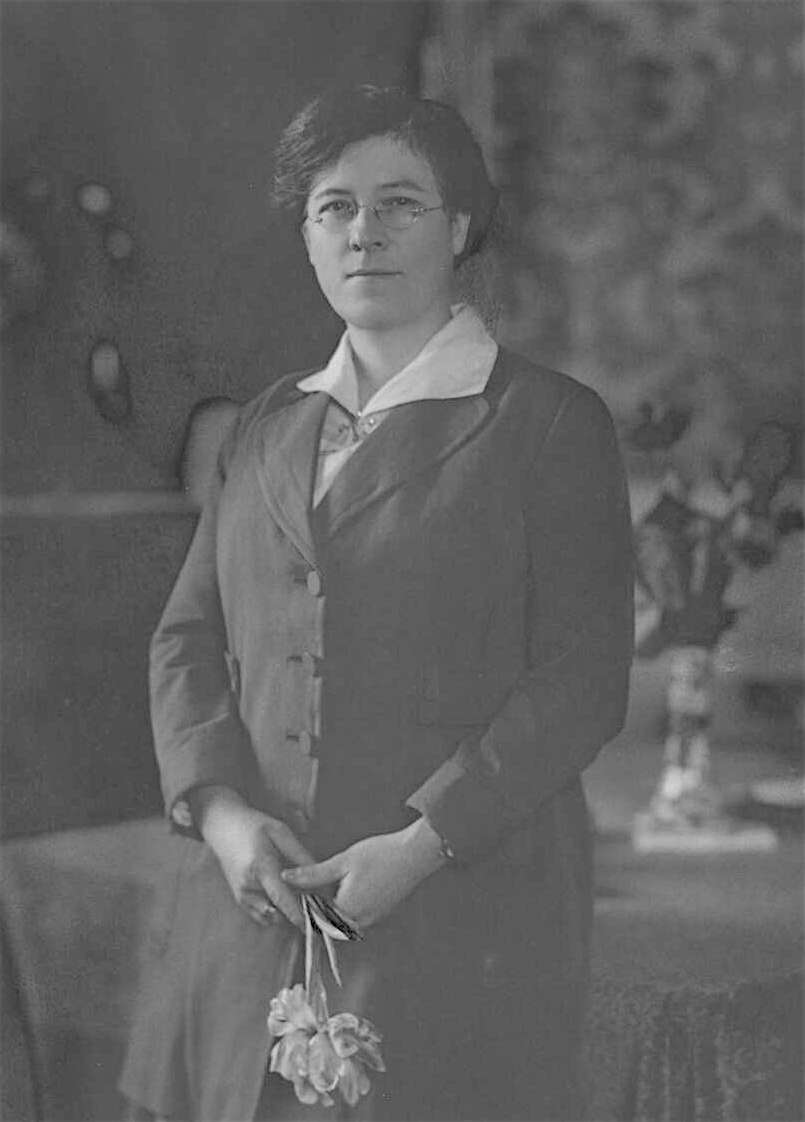
- Hughes, c. 1910

Spouse of the Prime Minister of Australia
- In role 27 October 1915 – 9 February 1923
- Preceded by: Dame Mary Cook
- Succeeded by: Viscountess Bruce

Personal details
- Born: Mary Ethel Campbell; 6 June 1874 near Wellington, New South Wales
- Died: 2 April 1958 (aged 83) Double Bay, New South Wales
- Resting place: Macquarie Park Cemetery and Crematorium
- Spouse: Billy Hughes
- Children: Helen Hughes (1915–1937)

Dame Mary Ethel Hughes GBE (née Campbell; 6 June 1874 – 2 April 1958) was the second wife of Billy Hughes, Prime Minister of Australia from 1915 to 1923. She was the daughter of a well-to-do grazier, and grew up in country New South Wales. She married Hughes in 1911, when she was 37 and he was 48; their only daughter was born in 1915.

== Early life ==
Mary Ethel Campbell was born on 6 June 1874 at Burrendong, a station near Wellington, New South Wales. Her father, Thomas Campbell, was an immigrant from what is now Northern Ireland, while her mother, the former Mary Ann Burton, had been born in Australia to English parents. Little is known about Campbell's upbringing, although she may have had some training as a nurse. The Campbell family seems to have had a certain amount of social standing, as in 1899 her sister Esther married John Haynes, a member of parliament and co-founder of The Bulletin.

== Marriage ==
Campbell married Billy Hughes on 26 June 1911, at Christ Church, South Yarra, Melbourne. She was 37 at the time; he was 48 and a widower (his first wife having died in 1906). He did not have time for a honeymoon, so he took her on a long drive. Their car crashed where the Sydney-Melbourne road crossed the Main Southern railway line north of Albury, leading to the crossing being named after Billy Hughes; it was later replaced by the Billy Hughes Bridge.

The couple had one child together, Helen Beatrice Myfanwy Hughes, born 11 August 1915. Mary also became the stepmother to the six surviving children from her husband's first marriage. However, she never developed a close relationship with her stepchildren – they were all adults or teenagers when she married their father, and various commitments (boarding school, military service, etc.) meant they did not often see each other.

== Public life ==
Mary Hughes accompanied Billy during his parliamentary sessions in Melbourne (then the seat of the federal government) and on domestic and overseas trips as Prime Minister (1916, 1918 and 1921). On the 1918 trip, he was in precarious health, and he wanted her to accompany him in order to look after him should he fall ill. Despite his insistence, officialdom did not permit her to travel on the same warship as him, and she went instead in a separate convoy with baby Helen.

It was during World War I that she became interested in the welfare of Australian servicemen, and she visited camps and hospitals in Britain, France and Australia. Both she and her husband became familiar faces at the Australian Imperial Force headquarters in Horseferry Road, at the ANZAC buffet at Victoria station, and in hospitals visiting wounded Australian troops.

On her overseas trips she became closely acquainted with influential British women such as Margaret Lloyd George, Margot Asquith, Clementine Churchill and suffragette leader Christabel Pankhurst.

== Honours ==
In the 1922 New Year Honours, she was appointed a Dame Grand Cross of the Order of the British Empire (GBE) for her charitable and war effort work. Some sources say she was the first Australian woman to receive this award, but she was in fact preceded in 1917 by another Prime Minister's wife, Dame Flora Reid.

== Later life ==
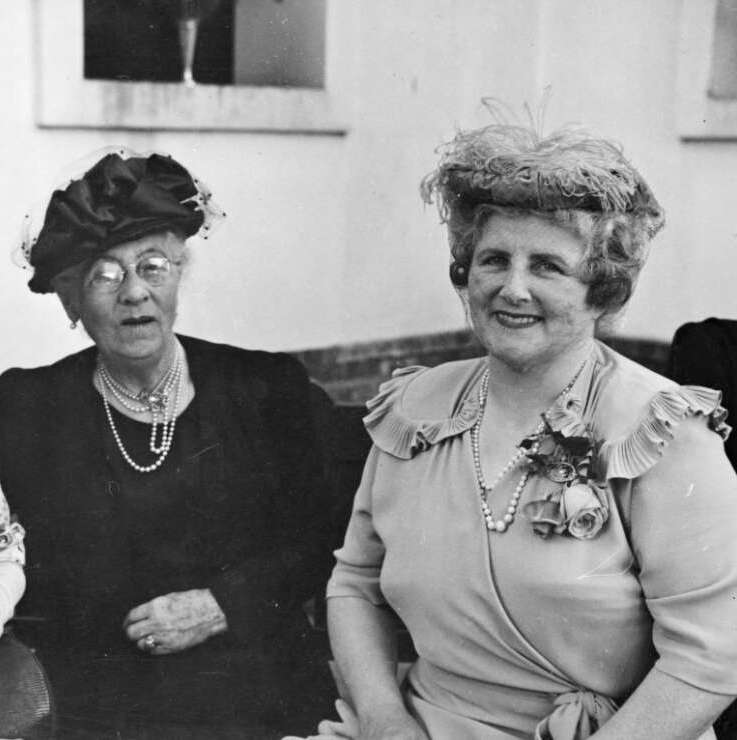
Hughes in 1955 with another prime ministerial widow, Dame Enid Lyons.

At the time of their marriage, her husband represented a Sydney seat, but between 1917 and 1922 he represented Bendigo in Victoria. In 1922 he won another Sydney seat and they returned there. After the war, she continued with her charity work and became president of the Rachel Forster Hospital for Women and Children in Sydney in 1925. She was also an advocate for women's rights. She was also an energetic worker in World War II.

== Death of daughter ==
Her daughter Helen died in a London nursing home on 9 August 1937, two days before her 22nd birthday. In contemporary press reports, her death was attributed to septicaemia, but as was revealed nearly 67 years later in 2004, she actually died in childbirth, unmarried. Mary and Billy's grandson now lives in Sydney under a different name.

== Final years ==
Hughes died in 1952, and Dame Mary outlived him by five and a half years. She died, aged 83, on 2 April 1958, at her niece's home in Double Bay, Sydney. She was interred at Macquarie Park Cemetery and Crematorium with her husband and next to her daughter.

Honorary titles
Preceded by Margaret Fisher	Spouse of the Prime Minister of Australia; 27 October 1915 – 9 February 1923	Succeeded by Ethel Bruce
