= Bronson–Mulholland House =

Historic house in Florida, United States

- Bronson–Mulholland House Judge Isaac Bronson House Sunny Point
- U.S. National Register of Historic Places
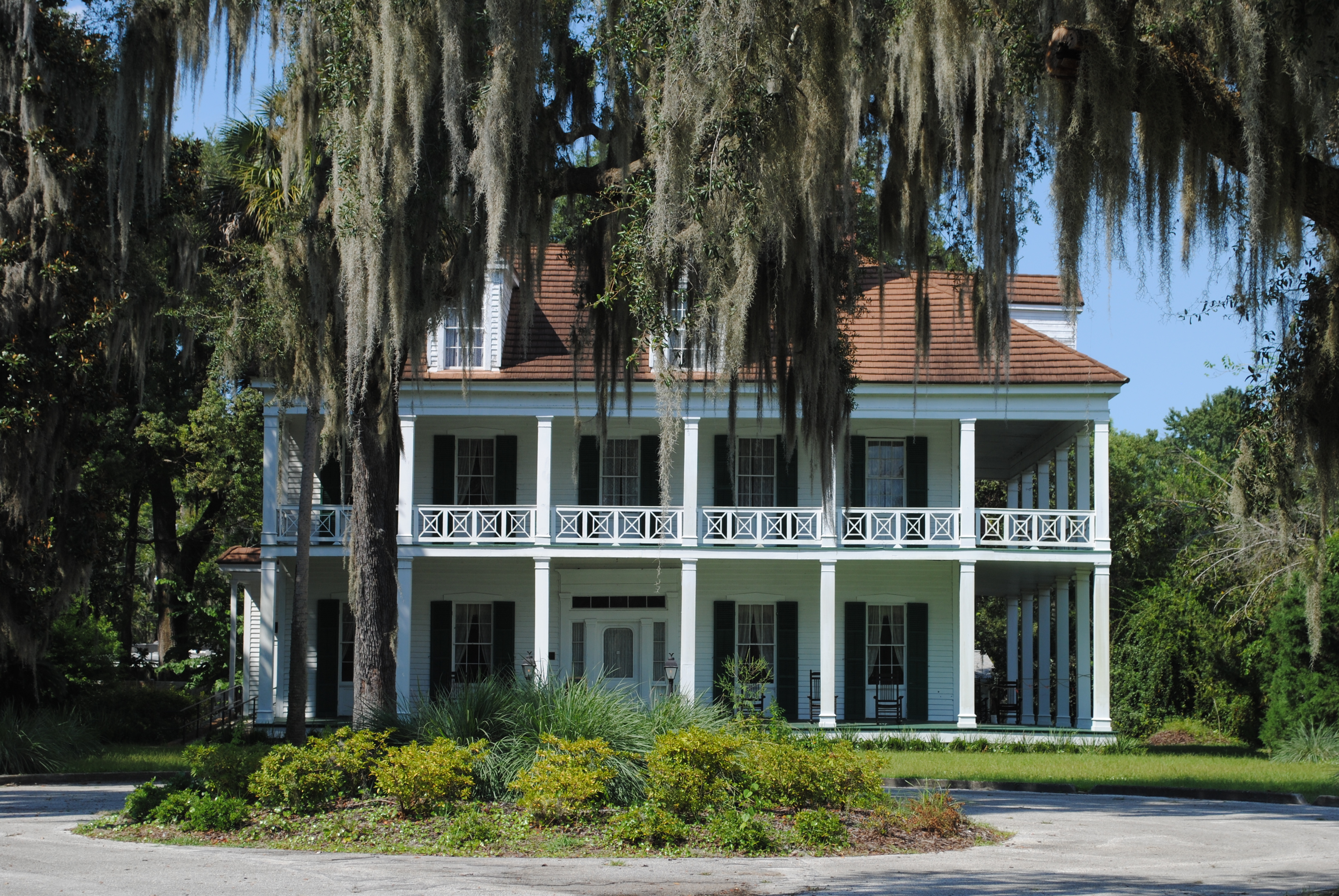

- Location within Florida Location within the United States
- Interactive map showing the location of Bronson-Mulholland House
- Location: 100 Madison Street; Palatka, Florida
- Coordinates: 29°39′0″N 81°37′42″W
- Built: 1854
- Architectural style: Southern Colonial
- NRHP reference No.: 72000351
- Added to NRHP: 27 December 1972

The Bronson–Mulholland House, (also known as the Judge Isaac H. Bronson House, Bronson's Point, Sunny Side, and Sunny Point), is an historic site located at 100 Madison Street, in Palatka, Florida. Sunny Point was built in 1854. On December 27, 1972, it was added to the U.S. National Register of Historic Places.

== History ==
=== Bronson era: 1852–1860 ===
Judge Isaac H. Bronson probably first considered moving to Palatka, Florida in 1852 when the "Palatka Tract" of about 1,220 acres was conveyed in trust to him by three prominent Palatka families – the Reids, the Carrs, and the Burts. In May 1855, Isaac and his wife Sophronia re-conveyed the tract to James Burt, excluding their estate known as Sunny Point, lands that had been sold by Bronson, and a number of lots held for Sophronia Bronson.

Through the early deed and mortgage books, it is possible to pinpoint the time the Bronsons built their home in Palatka and took up residence there. The 1850 United States census and Slave Schedule reports Bronson as a resident of St. Johns County. In September 1852 Bronson is referred to as a resident of St. Augustine, Florida, whereas in the following March he is listed as a resident of Palatka. Thus we can assume that in 1853 the Bronsons decided to make Palatka their home, as in that year they also marked off 10 acres of land along the St. Johns River which they named Sunny Point. A mortgage record dated March 3, 1854 notes Sunny point as "Being the point of ground upon which said Bronson is now building and cultivating grounds." Sunny Point was removed from the mortgage on the "Palatka Tract" on October 16, 1854, being lands "set apart by the said Bronson for his own residence, and on which he has lately erected a dwelling house and other buildings." Most likely, the Bronsons spent the winter of 1854 in their new home.

It is assumed that Bronson had cypress cut from lands near the mouth of the Ocklawaha River and brought to Sunny Point by raft. It is known that Bronson was part owner of the Palatka Saw Mill Company, which had a steam saw mill erected by August 1853. The lumber for the 7,199 square foot Bronson home was probably cut by that saw.

==== The Bronsons and Palatka ====
The Bronsons took active roles in the development of their new home town. Judge Bronson prepared and sponsored the city charter for Palatka in the state legislature. He also petitioned that the town be made the county seat of Putnam County, Florida. Additionally, he donated the land for the

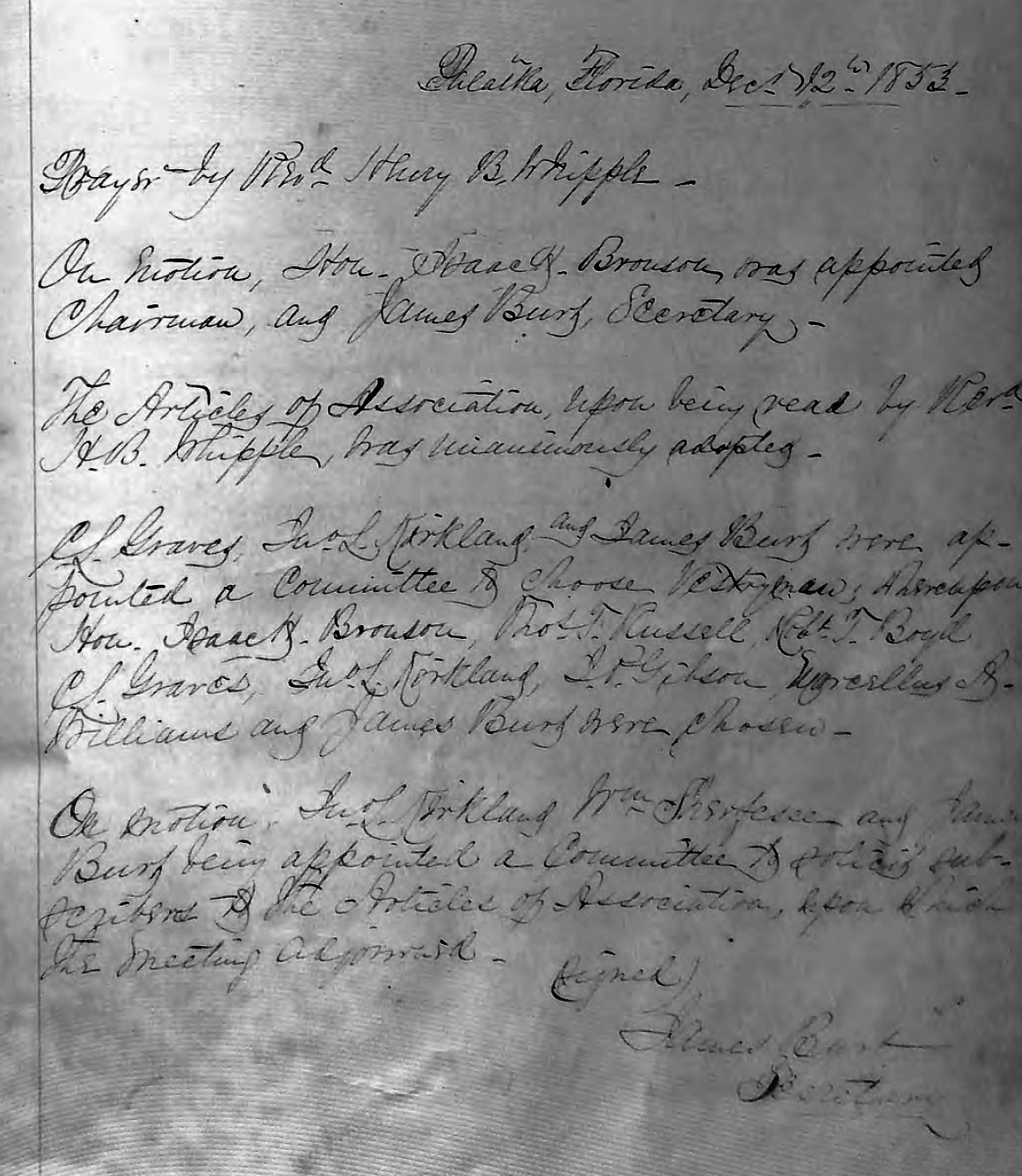
A page from the 1853 ledger of St. Mark's Episcopal Church in Palatka, Florida that shows the church's original charter and founding members, including Judge Bronson.

county courthouse, where it still stands today. The Bronsons and their two daughters, Gertrude and Emma, were members of St. Mark's Episcopal Church (Palatka, Florida), of which Isaac Bronson was chairman and one of the first vestrymen.

Isaac and Sophronia entertained in their new home. Among their visitors were William Dunn Moseley, Florida's first state governor, Robert Raymond Reid, another Florida governor, and Benjamin A. Putnam, for whom the county was named. The American Guide Series describes Sunny Point as a public social center in the 1850s.

Isaac Bronson died on August 13, 1855, and was buried in a fifteen square foot plot at the southwest corner of Sunny Point. On his mausoleum were the words "In his death men have lost a friend, Society an upright citizen, and the Church a humble and loving son." When Sophronia Bronson sold the property to Charlotte J. Henry in 1867, the new owner agreed to preserve the burial plot. In 1892 the Bronson daughters, Emma and Gertrude, agreed to return the fifteen square feet of land to the current owners upon the removal of Isaac Bronson's grave. Today, Judge Isaac Bronson's mausoleum rests in Palatka's Oak Hill Cemetery.

In 1854, prior to his passing, Isaac Bronson made George A. Fairbanks a trustee of Sunny Point for Sophronia Bronson. Fairbanks paid $3,000, and the step was taken either to protect Sophronia after the death of her husband, or for financial reasons. After her husband's death, Sophronia Bronson remained at Sunny Point. Deed records dated November 1856 indicate that Mrs. Bronson was in Palatka at that time. Donations made to St. Mark's Church up to April 1860 suggest that she was at Sunny Point until the outbreak of the Civil War. At that time, she probably returned to her home state of New York, although the earliest record of her being there is in June 1866. Sophronia Bronson died in Morristown, New Jersey, in June 1874.

=== Civil War: 1861–1865 ===
Sunny Point was vacant during the Civil War. It is believed that, early in the war, Confederate soldiers used the attic of the house as a lookout when Union forces were approaching down the St. John's River. In 1864, Union troops occupied the city of Palatka and utilized Sunny Point as an encampment. The house was also utilized by Union troops as a lookout for Confederate blockade runners.

=== White Era: 1866–1904 ===
==== Charlotte Henry and the Freedman's Union Commission School ====
Charlotte Henry (eventually becoming Charlotte White) was originally from New York, and became a close associate with Sophronia Bronson when she returned to New York from Palatka. How connections formed between the two is unknown, but there are several possibilities; one of these being the fact that they were both abolitionists. In any case, an association was formed, and it was instrumental in Charlotte Henry's decision to come to Palatka. According to the records, Miss Henry purchased 300 acres of land located seven miles from Palatka in October 1865. In January 1866 she opened a school in Palatka which was supported by the New York branch of the Freedmen's Bureau. Although there is no record of where the first classes were held, later evidence indicates that Miss Henry's school always met at Sunny Point. Sunny Point was leased by Sophronia Bronson to the Freedman's Union Commission in November 1866. At that time Charlotte Henry was teaching over 60 African American children. We can assume that she enjoyed her work and was happy at Sunny Point because she made arrangements to buy the property from Mrs. Bronson. Miss Henry paid $6,000 and agreed to honor the lease made to the Freedman's Union Commission.

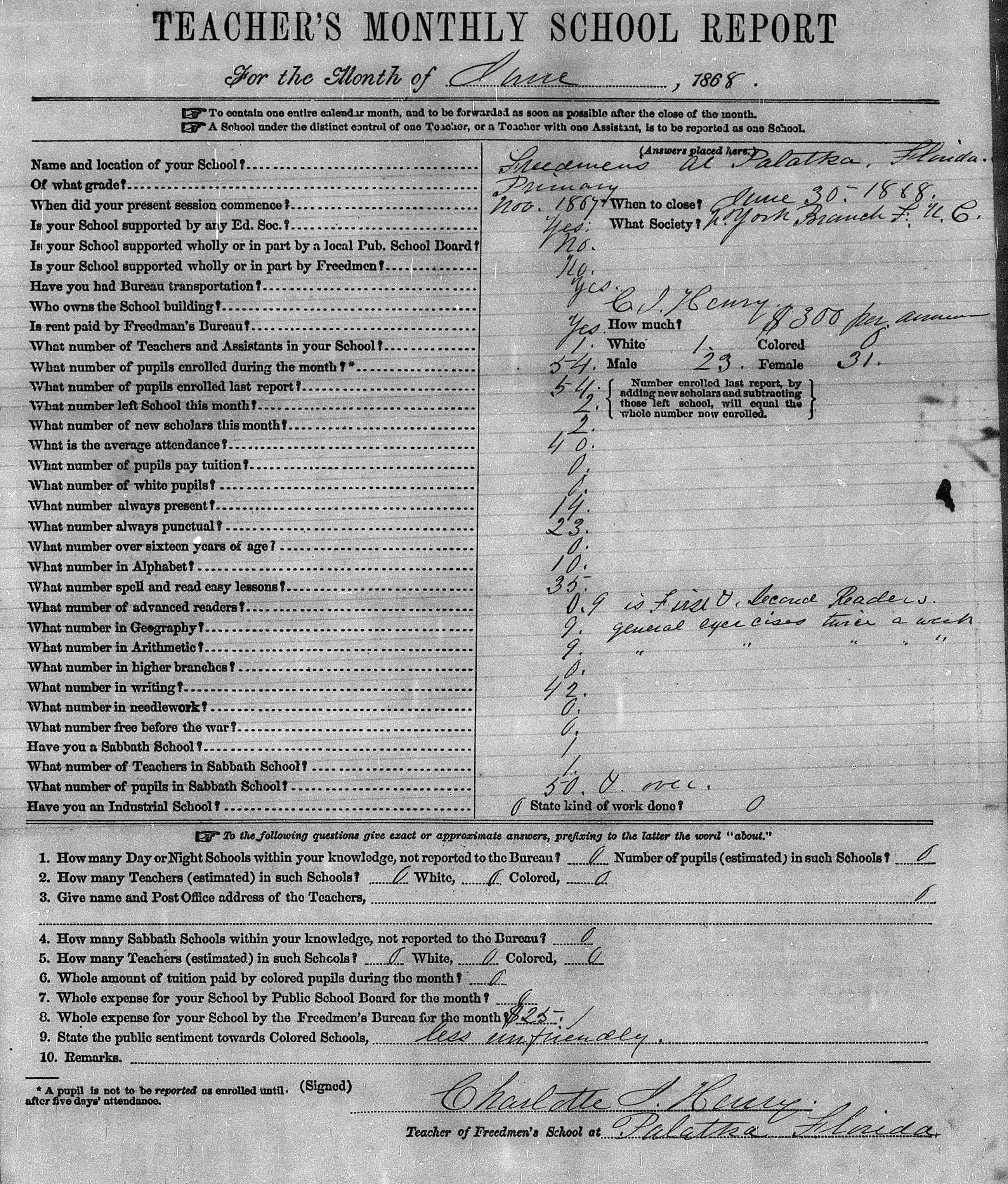

Charlotte Henry continued her school in Palatka through June 1868. It is believed that she also handed out the provisions sent by the government for the students every Saturday. Unfortunately, the school was closed in 1868. However, the fact that Miss Henry remained in Palatka after the school's closing indicates that she and the townspeople got along well. The most likely reason for the closing of the school was financial. Around the time of the school's closing, the Superintendent of Education Charles H. Foster received a letter from the Freedman's Union Commission informing him that "greatly to their regret they will not be able to continue the work they have hitherto prosecuted in Florida." The entire Freedman's Union Commission was beginning to dissolve, and would do so completely by the next year.

==== Charlotte and Nathaniel P. White ====
In March 1873, Nathaniel P. White took over Miss Henry's mortgage on the other property she owned outside Palatka. The two were probably married by that time, with the wedding taking place in New York. The earliest documented date of Charlotte Henry as Mrs. Nathaniel P. White was in 1874, when the couple was listed as members of St. Mark's Episcopal Church. Nathaniel White was originally from Port Huron, Michigan, so speculation is that he was on vacation in Palatka when he met Miss Henry.

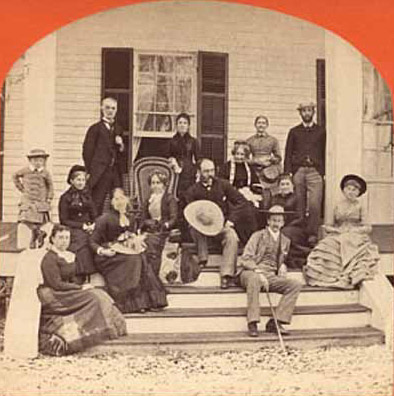
A photo of Charlotte Henry White (seated, center) and possibly her husband Nathaniel P. White (standing left of Charlotte) with a group on the steps of the Bronson-Mulholland House in Palatka, Florida.

According to the records of St. Mark's church, all White family contributions were made in the winter months. An article in The Eastern Herald dated September 25, 1875, stated that "Bronson's point is looking grand and beautiful, but it needs its occupants N.P. White, Esq., and his excellent wife to charm it into life." Likewise, on June 3, 1892, The Palatka Weekly Times noted that N.P. White was leaving for Pennsylvania, having spent the previous two summers in New Hampshire and Michigan. This leads one to believe that Sunny Point had become a summer home for the Whites. Nathaniel White died in Port Huron in December 1895, leaving Charlotte as the sole heir of his real and personal property both in Michigan and Florida. Where and how Mrs. White spent her time after the death of her husband is unknown, but she probably spent much of it at Sunny Point. In 1899 her name appears as a member of the St. Mark's Church, and she died in Palatka in January 1904 at the age of 82. She is buried in Oak Hill Cemetery in Palatka – the same cemetery that contains Judge Isaac Bronson's mausoleum.

=== Mulholland era: 1904–1945 ===
Mary Mulholland was born in 1842. According to Edelmira Rivero, who later lived with her for several years, Miss Mulholland took nursing training at the Peter Bent Brigham Hospital in Boston, Massachusetts. She then went on with her studies, stopping three months short of becoming a medical doctor. It was in Boston that she met Charlotte White, but in what year is unknown. The most likely reason for Mary Mulholland's arrival at Sunny Point was that she spent her vacations with the Whites and stayed on to help care for Nathaniel White when he became ill. After his death in 1895, she remained with Charlotte at Sunny Point.

In January 1904, a few days before her death, Charlotte White conveyed Sunny Point to Mary Mulholland. The property at the time included almost the same land that Sophronia Bronson had sold her in 1867. However, Miss Mulholland was unable to keep the estate intact. In 1914 she began selling lots for residential purposes and by 1936 at least seven other homes stood on what was once part of Sunny Point. Miss Mulholland also borrowed over $7,500 between 1917 and 1935 which, according to Edelmira Rivero, was used to pay property taxes. Miss Rivero notes that Miss Mulholland "sacrificed so much to hold what she could," and did her best to keep the place beautiful. She had stone posts erected at each entrance way, in which the words "Mulholland Park" were cut. The land was beautifully landscaped and along the river were weeping willows and oleanders.

Mary Mulholland did not nurse professionally after the death of Mrs. White, probably because she was in her sixties by that time. Miss Rivero recalled that Miss Mulholland would go "quietly among the poor and used her knowledge and skill to help them; she never refused a call from them." After the outbreak of World War I, Miss Mulholland became active in the Putnam Country Red Cross Chapter, serving as Vice Chairman in 1917 when the chapter was first organized. She allowed the Red Cross to use the east wing of her home as a work room, and she herself made service calls to the homes of soldiers. On October 4, 1935, Mary Mulholland died in Palatka and is buried in Oak Hill Cemetery, along with Judge Isaac Bronson and Charlotte White. Upon her death, Mary Mulholland's possession of Sunny Point passed on to Edelmira Rivero, stating she "...lived with me in my home in Palatka, from the time that she was a little girl until she was a young lady, and has been a great help and assistance to me and has done me many acts of kindness."

==== Edelmira Rivero and Sunny Point ====
Edelmira Rivero was born in Cuba during the Spanish–American War. Her parents died by the time she was three or four, leaving her and her sister Taurina (about five years older) orphaned. Eventually, they found their way into a Florida orphanage after a pair of visiting Episcopalian nuns found them living without parents. They remained at the orphanage until Edelmira was ten or eleven, and Taurina was fifteen. Taurina described her sister as a beautiful young girl with auburn hair, and says she was often taken around to various locations and used as an example of the types of wards the orphanage cared for. However, Taurina described the living conditions at the orphanage as unpleasant, and they eventually ran away. It is not told how they came to Palatka, but shortly thereafter, Mary Mulholland employed Taurina as a housekeeper. Apparently Miss Mulholland had a reasonably good but fiery relationship with Taurina. She also became very fond of Edelmira and wished to adopt her, but Taurina would not allow it.

When Taurina married at 18 in 1907, she told her younger sister that she could either come live with her or stay with Miss Mulholland. Miss Mulholland promised Taurina that Edelmira would be well cared for and given a college education if she was allowed to stay. We know now that Edelmira elected to stay and Miss Mulholland was true to her word. Throughout her life, Taurina often visited the two at Sunny Point.

When Miss Mulholland died in 1935, Miss Rivero had become a teacher in Jacksonville, Florida. Unable to live in Palatka, she had the shutters of Sunny Point bolted, and eventually moved the furniture – much of which was in the house when the Whites had lived there – to Jacksonville. At the same time, she gave permission to the Red Cross Chapter to continue meeting in the house. The chapter met in the west wing and continued their service activities through World War II.

Edelmira Rivero owned the house for ten years. Like Miss Mulholland, she found it necessary to sell land once part of Sunny Point as residential lots. In 1945 Edelmira felt that she could no longer keep Sunny Point. Later in her life, she wrote the following:

I loved the beautiful house in which I had grown up, and wanted to keep it. I held on for ten years. During World War II I let the Red Cross make their headquarters there. The roof leaked, I had a new roof put on and it still leaked. I was teaching in high school in Jacksonville and couldn't be in Palatka. I had seen how Miss Mulholland had struggled through the years to hold the property. Doing without things herself and borrowing to pay the high taxes. I realized I couldn't afford to hold on to it, so I sold it.

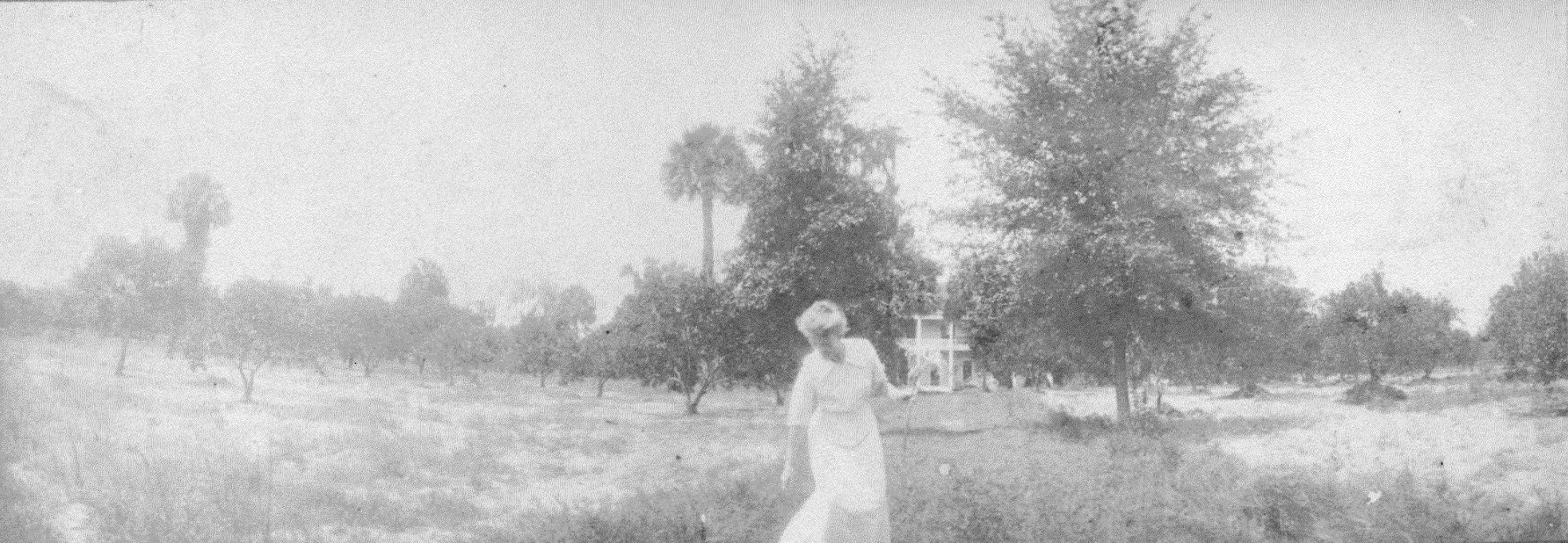
Photo of the Bronson-Mulholland House circa 1935 with unknown woman. Original photo held by the Putnam County Archives in Palatka, Florida

The lot which Edelmira Rivero sold in 1945 has the same boundaries as the lot we see today. She continued to live and teach in Jacksonville until her death in 1974. She was buried next to Mary Mulholland in Oak Hill Cemetery – along with other former residents of Sunny Point.

=== Postwar era: 1945–1977 ===
In 1945, Sunny Point (now called Mulholland Park) was briefly owned by the Reverend and Mrs. J.C. Yelton. They sold the house in 1946 to Laura and E.C. Hindman, who took out three different mortgages on the property – in 1946, 1948, and 1951. It is probable that the Hindmans divided the house into apartments and walled in the east porches immediately after they purchased it. An article in the Palatka Daily News in November 1946 noted that "Mr. and Mrs. B.M. Jones have moved to the Hindman Apartments in Mulholland Park." In 1955, the Hindmans sold the house to Grace and James Jones, their daughter and son-in-law. The city directory of 1956 listed nine apartments at the same address as the house. Interviews with a couple that resided in the house in the 1950s reported it to have between 8 and 14 apartments. In May 1956 it was sold yet again to a Key David McMurrain, who promised to keep the property in repair and insured against fire. In 1962, the house was transferred to McMurrain's ward William. The 1960 and 1964 directories refer to the house as the Mulholland Apartments. Finally, in January 1965, William McMurrain sold the property to the City of Palatka, which brought the apartment period to an end. It was then that interest began in restoring the house to its original splendor, as by that time the house had fallen into severe disrepair. Added to the National Register of Historic Places in 1972, the Bronson–Mulholland house was open to visitors in 1977.

=== Restoration era: 1977–present ===
Many efforts have been made over the years to appropriately restore the Bronson–Mulholland house to its original splendor. While the City of Palatka owns the structure and the surrounding land, the Putnam County Historical Society in partnership maintains all of the interior furnishings. Due to the nature of the history of the house, very little of its original furnishings remain. Most of the pieces are antiques from the mid to late 1800s – and many are generous donations or loans from local families. There are, however, some pieces on loan from the family of Edelmira Rivero that are original to the home, and are from when the Whites occupied it.

Today, the house serves as both a historical resource and an event venue. Every year at the end of September, Civil War re-enactors gather on the green in front of the house to recreate the Union Occupation of Palatka in 1864. Recent efforts have been made to restore the home to its status as a major wedding venue in Northeast Florida.

== Future plans ==
The City of Palatka hopes to revitalize interest in the house by marketing it once again as a wedding and event venue, as well as a vital cultural and historical resource for Floridians. A monthly newsletter as well as a Facebook page have been launched, along with an active website. The home is frequently open for tours, and regular historical lectures open to the public are held in the front parlor.

Currently the home is undergoing renovations with most of the work being focused on the first floor porch which has been removed due to damaged and worn wood. The home is at current surrounded by a construction fence, but the home and museum next door are both regularly open to the public. At the current time there is no official continuation or completion date for the restoration work under way.

== Gallery ==
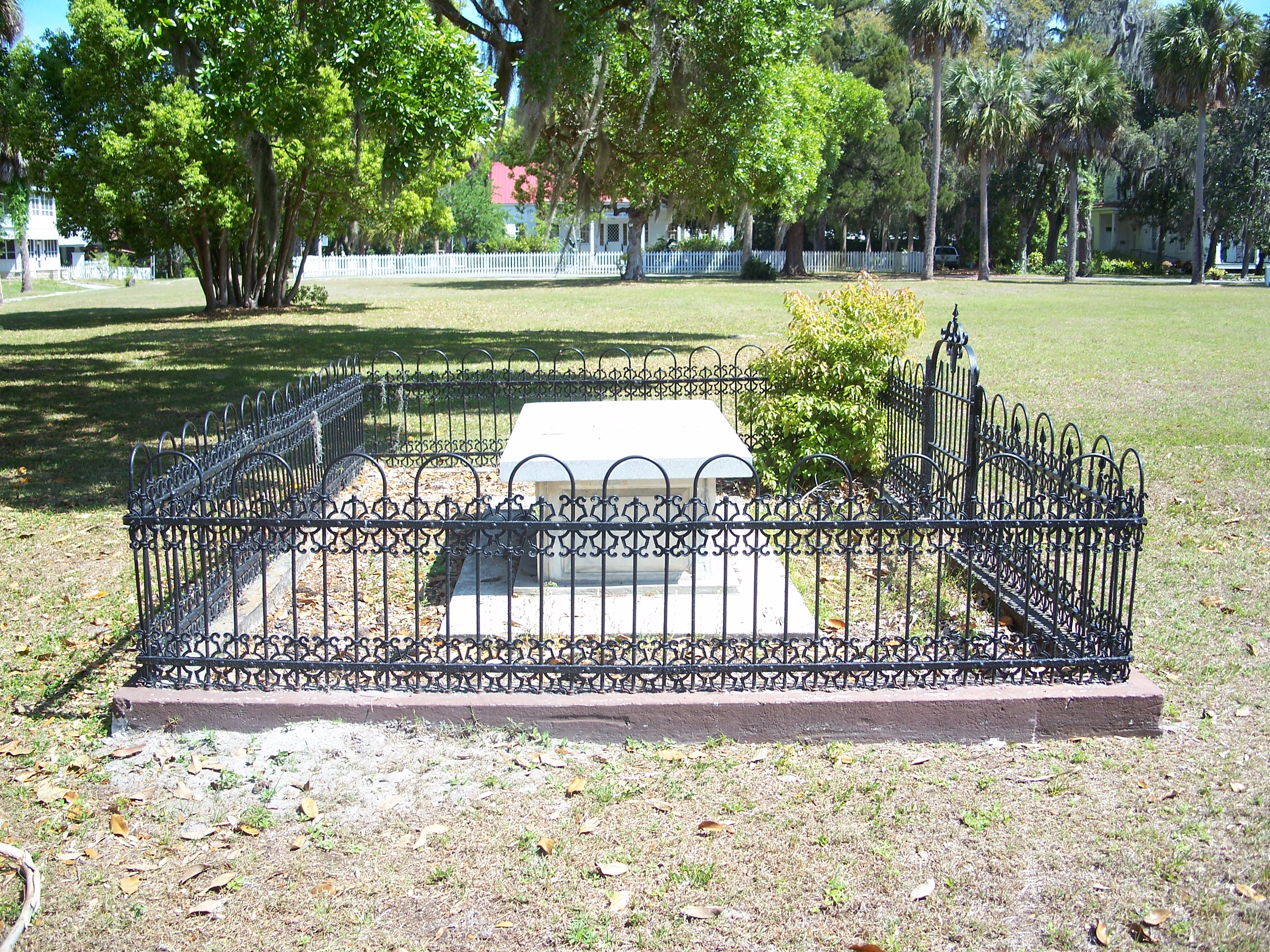
Isaac Bronson memorial outside the Bronson–Mulholland House

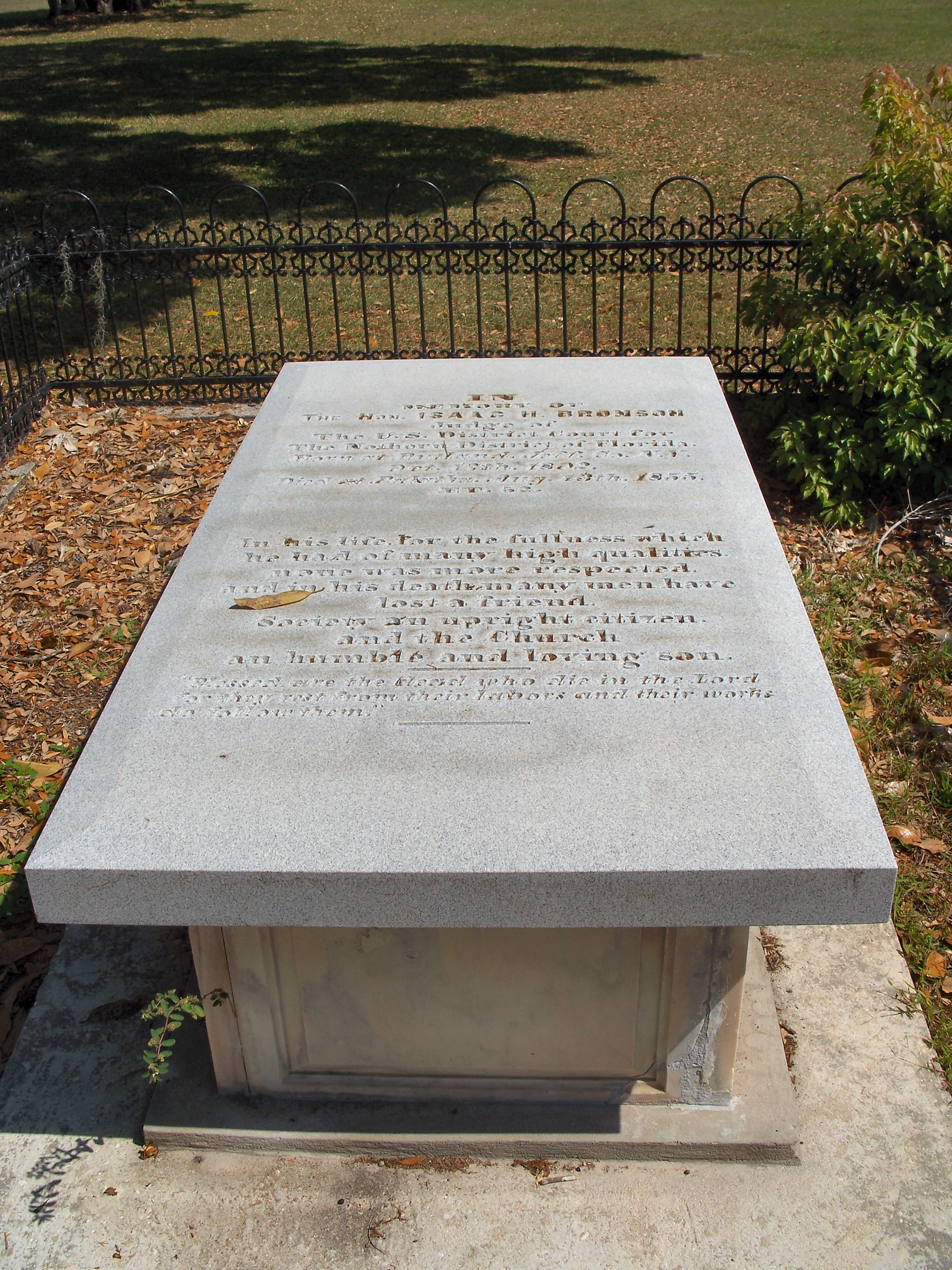
Isaac Bronson memorial outside the Bronson–Mulholland House

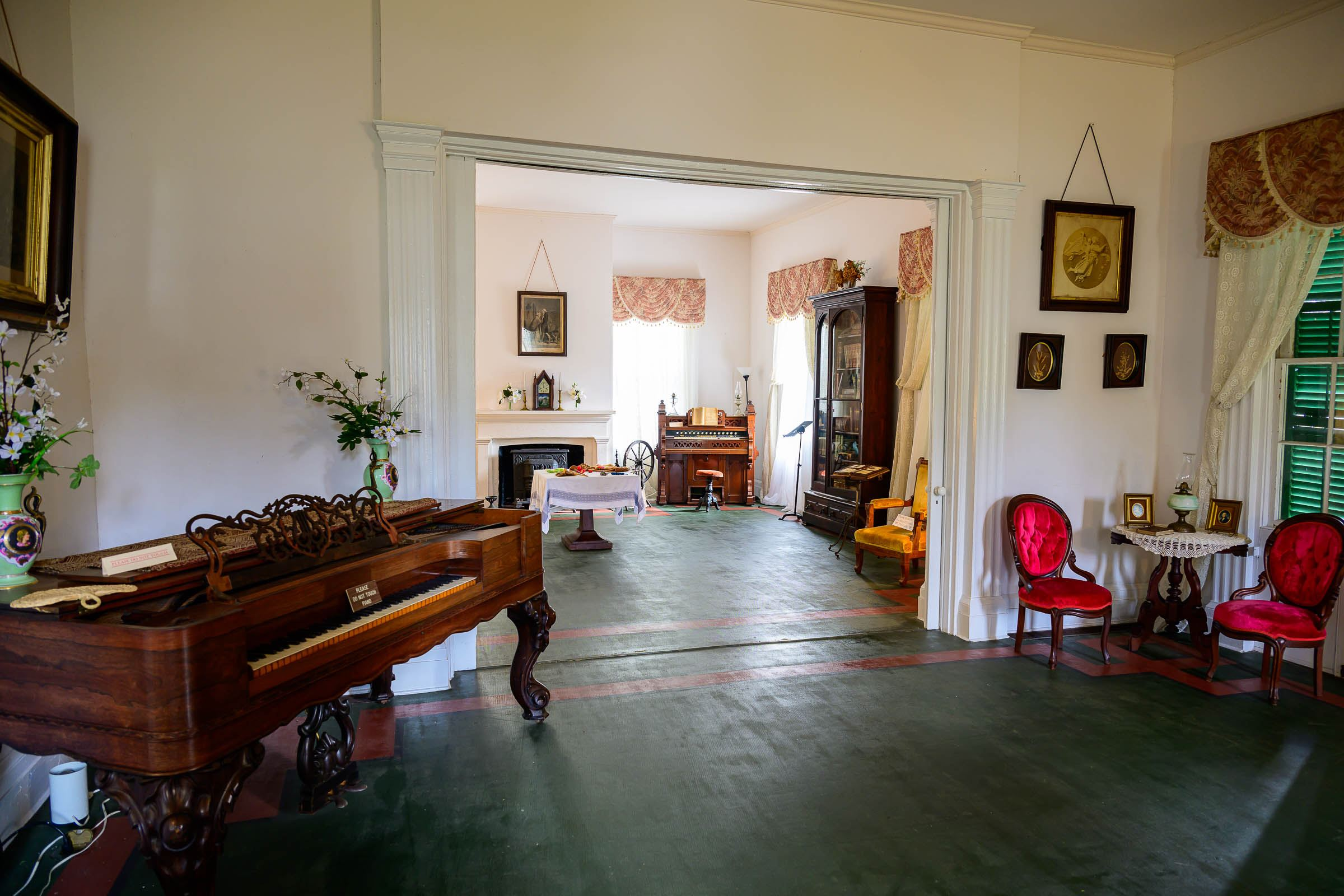
Photograph of the interior of the Bronson–Mulholland House standing in the front parlor and looking into the rear parlor.

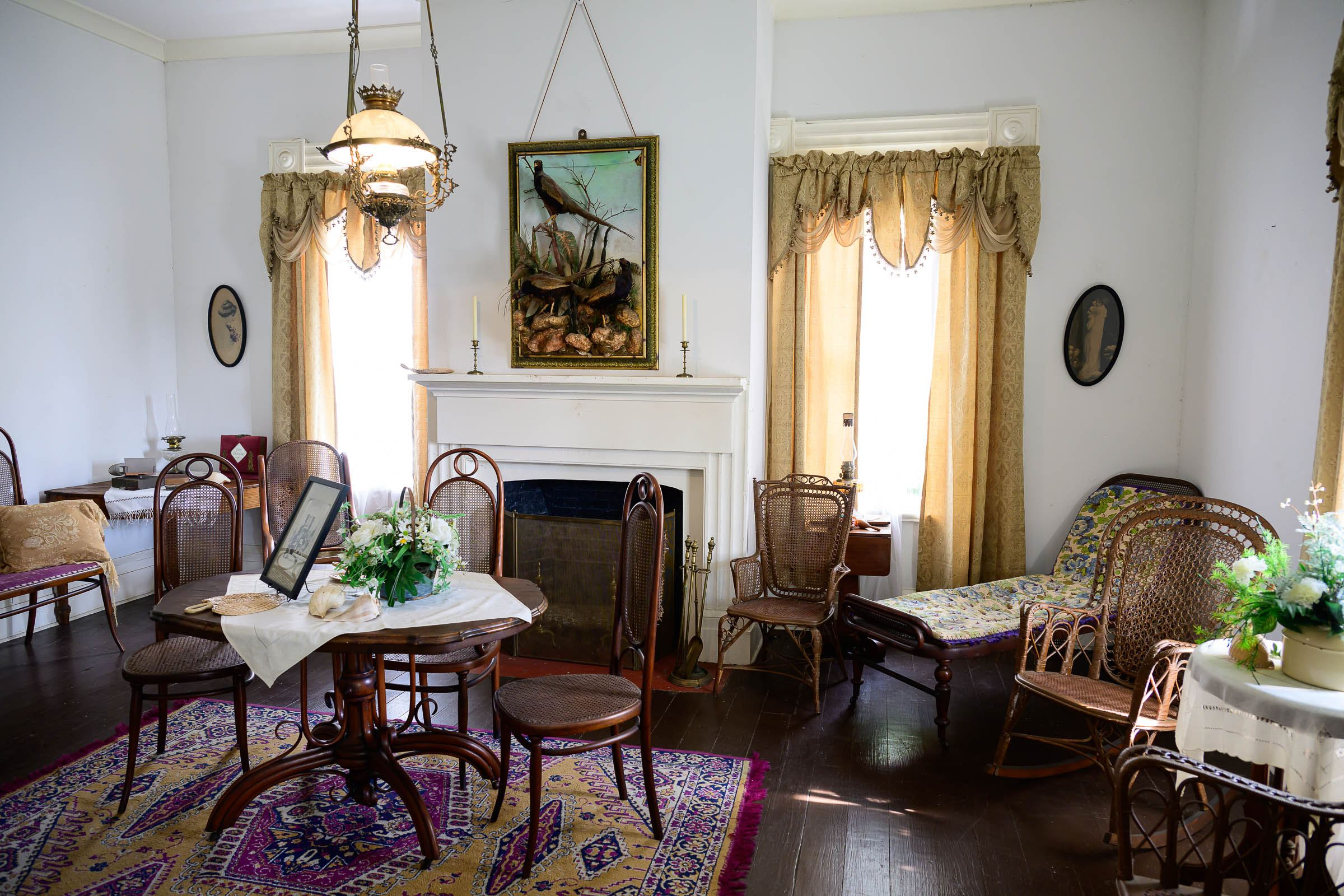
Photograph of the interior of the Bronson–Mulholland House standing in the upstairs bentwood parlor.

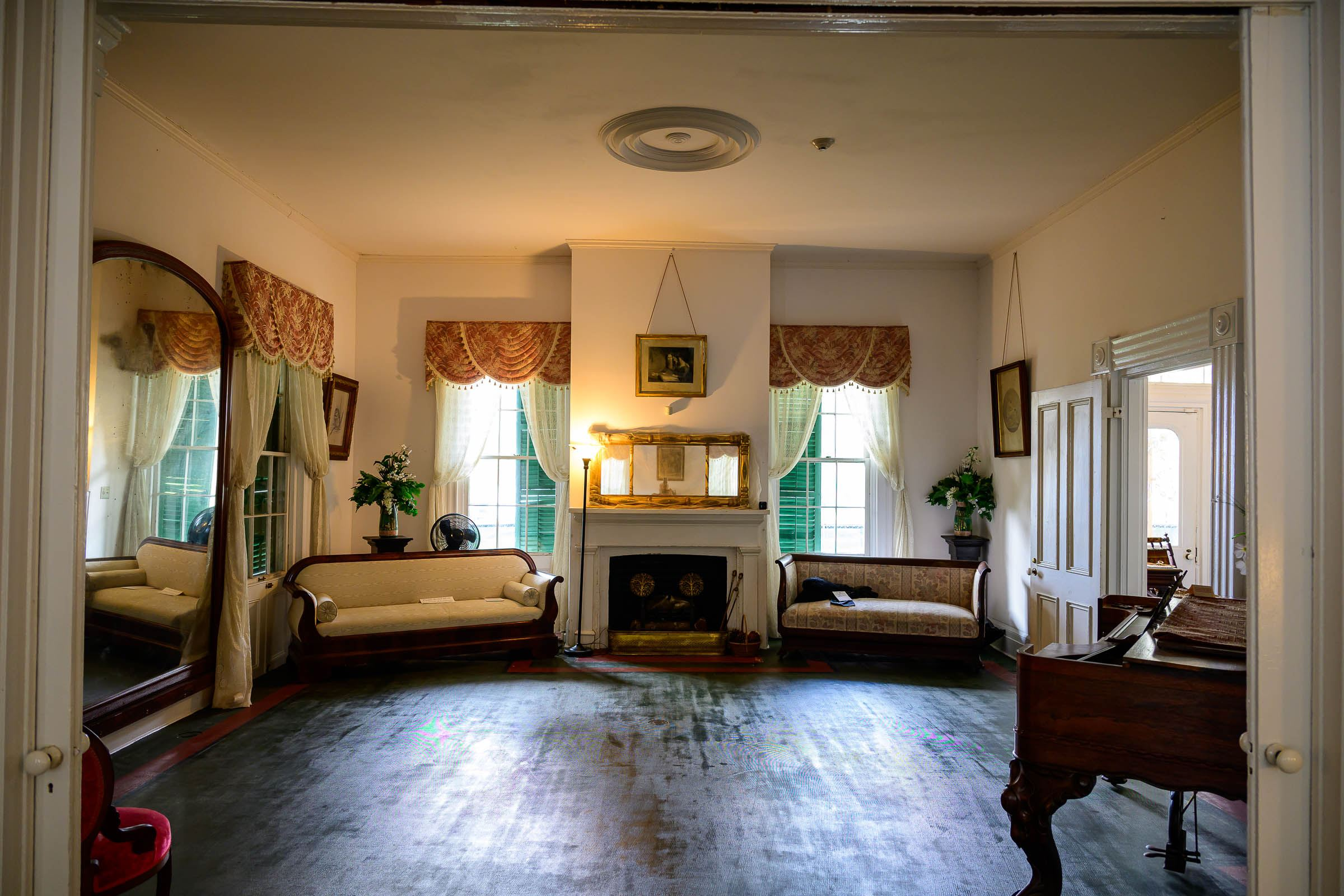
Photograph of the interior of the Bronson–Mulholland House standing in the rear parlor and looking into the front parlor.

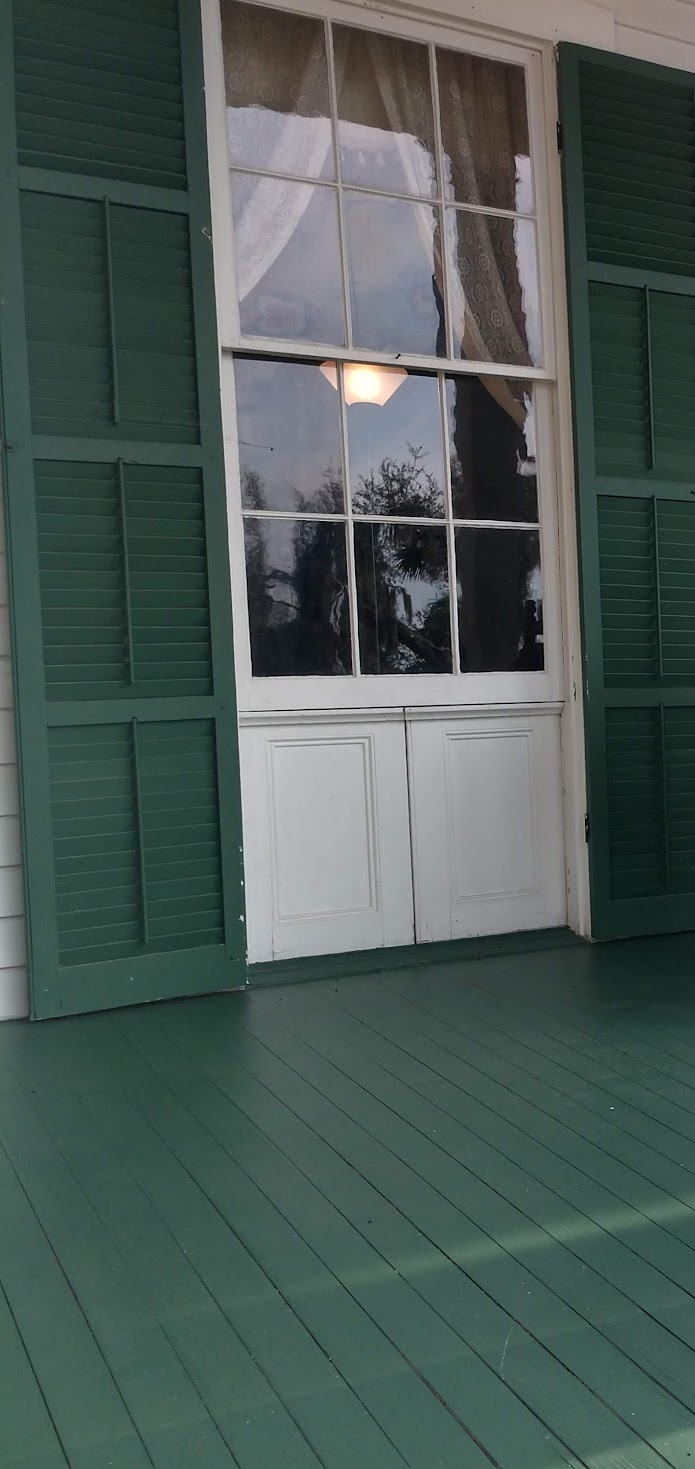
A close up of the windows of the Bronson–Mulholland House. Most of the windows are jib windows; note the doors below the glass that could be opened to fully extended the window to the floor.

== See also ==
- National Register of Historic Places listings in Florida
