= Cecil Cook =

Cecil Cook may refer to:

- Cecil Cook (1921–1996), English cricketer more commonly known as Sam Cook
- Cecil Cook (physician) (1897–1985), Australian physician and Chief Protector of Aborigines for the Northern Territory

== See also ==
- Richard Cecil Cook (1902–1977), Australian judge
- Cecil Cooke (1923–1983), Bahamian sailor
- Cook (surname)
