= Hugh Browne (businessman) =

Australian businessman and Spiritualist (1829-1905)

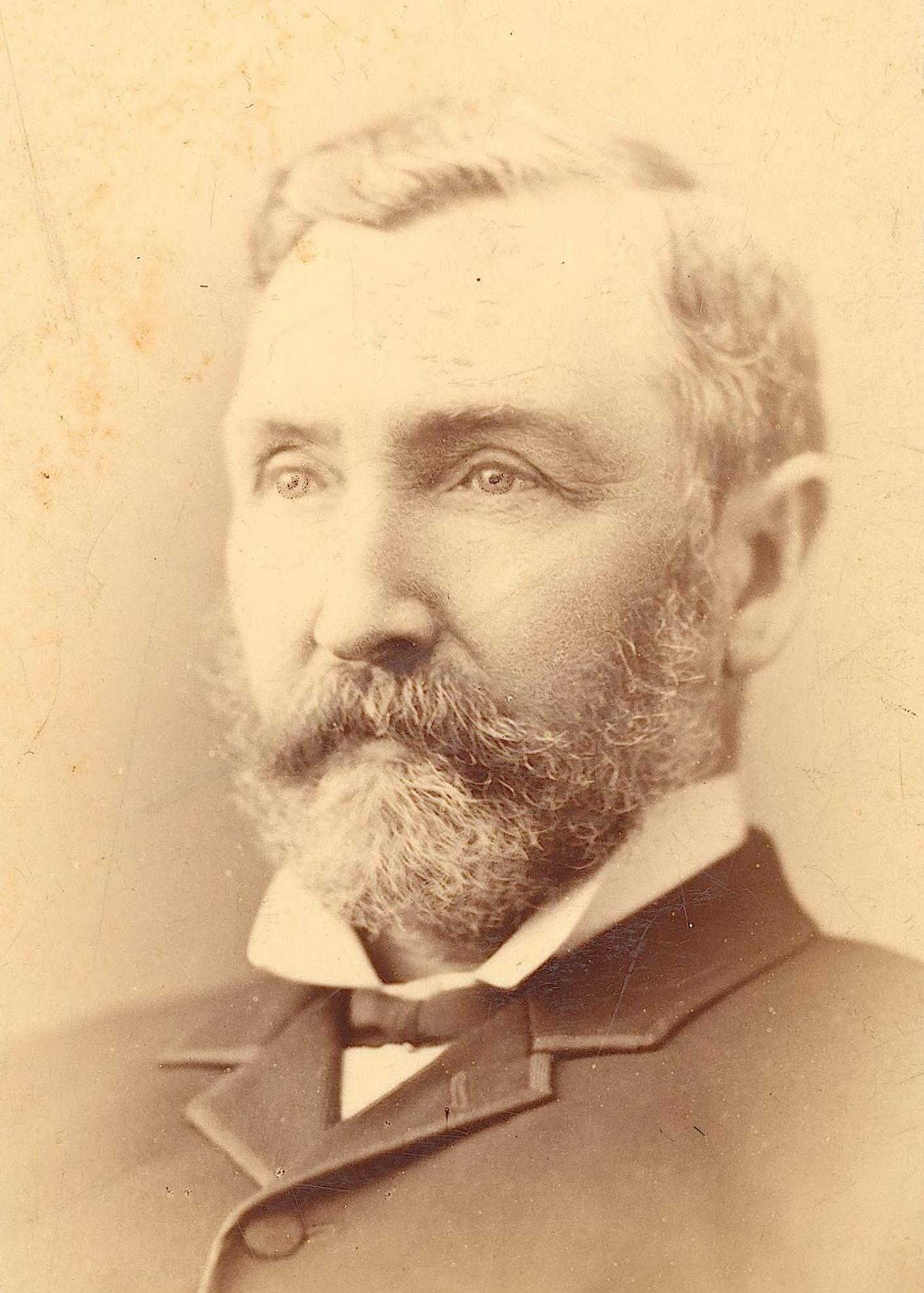
- Born: 1829; Edinburgh, Scotland
- Died: 3 December 1905 (aged 75–76); South Yarra, Victoria, Australia
- Spouse: Elizabeth Turner (m. 1858)
- Relatives: Pattie Deakin (daughter); Alfred Deakin (son-in-law)

Hugh Junor Browne (1829 – 3 December 1905) was an Australian businessman and Spiritualist. He was born in Scotland and first arrived in Australia during the Victorian gold rush, developing diverse business interests in Melbourne. His daughter Pattie married Australian prime minister Alfred Deakin.

== Early life ==
Browne was born in 1829 in Edinburgh, Scotland. He was the son of Martha (née Matheson) and Archibald Browne. His father was a Church of Scotland minister from Paisley who moved to the South American colony of Demerara and became the first minister of St. Andrew's Kirk, Georgetown. His mother was the widow of Hugh Junor, a merchant originally from the Black Isle who came to own a timber plantation and a substantial number of slaves in Essequibo.

Browne was educated in Scotland and England. He studied medicine for two years and also briefly studied law, but at the age of 21 moved to the Colony of Natal in South Africa where he took up cattle farming. He first came to Australia in 1852 during the Victorian gold rush, where he took up a mining claim at Fryer's Creek for six months.

== Business activities ==
During the gold rush, Browne established a brick factory in Brunswick and ran a store at Forest Creek. After a short period he sold his business in Victoria and returned to Natal. He remained in South Africa for two years, eventually purchasing a ship and bringing a cargo of sugar to Melbourne which he sold for a substantial profit. He purchased an estate at Broadmeadows and was elected chairman of the newly created Broadmeadows Road Board in 1858. Browne was best known as the founder of the Australian Distillery Works, located near Princes Bridge on the Yarra River.

In 1873, Browne purchased a house on Wellington Parade in East Melbourne, which he hired architect Francis Maloney White to expand into a mansion and subsequently named Park House. It was eventually demolished in 1967.

== Personal life ==
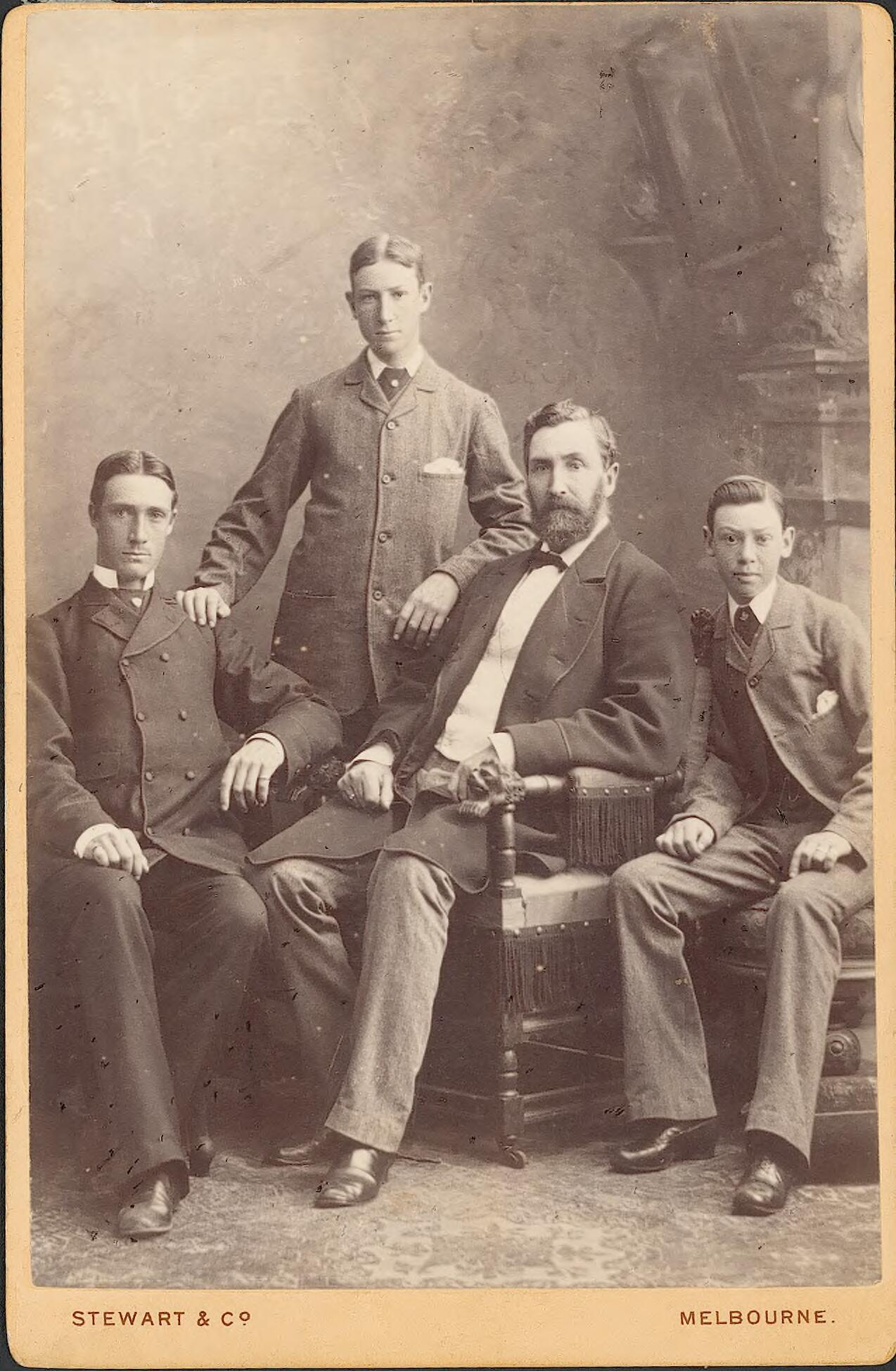
Browne with his older sons

In 1858, Browne married Elizabeth Alice Turner, with whom he had four daughters and seven sons. His daughter Pattie married Australian prime minister Alfred Deakin.

Browne died on 3 December 1905 at his home in South Yarra, Victoria. His estate was valued for probate at £37,423 (equivalent to $6,300,000 in 2022), largely consisting of real estate.

=== Spiritualism ===
Browne became influenced by Spiritualism in the 1860s. He attended lectures at the Victorian Association of Progressive Spiritualists and in 1874 attended a séance led by American medium Charles H. Foster, where he believed he made contact with his deceased father. This experience "led to his final endorsement of Spiritualism and entire renouncement of the old faith".

Browne established a séance circle at his home in East Melbourne, where his daughter Pattie frequently served as medium. He was active in the Association of Progressive Spiritualists and wrote for its monthly journal Harbinger of Light. In 1876 he published a Spiritualist tract titled The Holy Truth; or, the Coming Reformation, Universal and Eternal Because Founded on Demonstrable Truth. He later published the autobiographical Reasons for the Hope That is in Me in 1891.

=== Sons' deaths ===
In December 1884, Browne's sons William McDonald Browne and Hugh Mackenzie Browne disappeared while sailing their yacht Iolanthe on Port Phillip Bay, along with their friend Henry Murray who was employed at Browne's distillery. William's body was recovered and an inquest found that he had drowned, although he was missing his left arm. Several weeks later, a great white shark measuring 14 feet (4.3 m) was caught off the pier at Frankston and was found to have consumed Hugh's right arm and various personal possessions.

After their sons' disappearance, Browne and his wife engaged clairvoyant George Spriggs to assist in the search. Spriggs purported to make contact with their spirits and produced a detailed account of their death, which Browne attempted to submit as evidence to a coronial inquest. His account of Spriggs' contact with his sons was accepted by other Spiritualists, including Arthur Conan Doyle.
