= Spouse or partner of the prime minister of Australia =

Spouse or partner of the Prime Minister of Australia
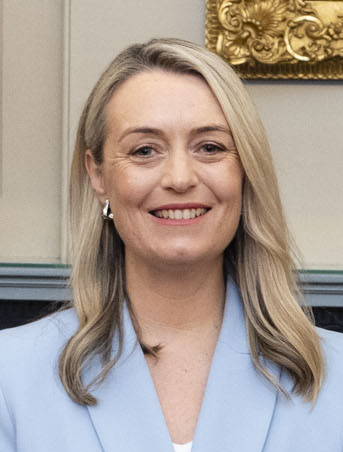
- Incumbent; Jodie Haydon since 23 May 2022
- Residence: The Lodge (primary); Kirribilli House (secondary)
- Inaugural holder: Jane Barton
- Formation: 1 January 1901

The spouse or partner of the prime minister of Australia is the host of The Lodge and Kirribilli House, usually the wife, husband, or partner of the prime minister of Australia, concurrent with the tenure of the prime minister. Although there are no officially defined responsibilities for the role, the incumbent is generally a high-profile individual who is involved in the political and social life of Australia, assisting the prime minister with carrying out ceremonial duties as well as performing various other functions.

The spouse of prime minister Anthony Albanese is Jodie Haydon.

== Role and functions ==
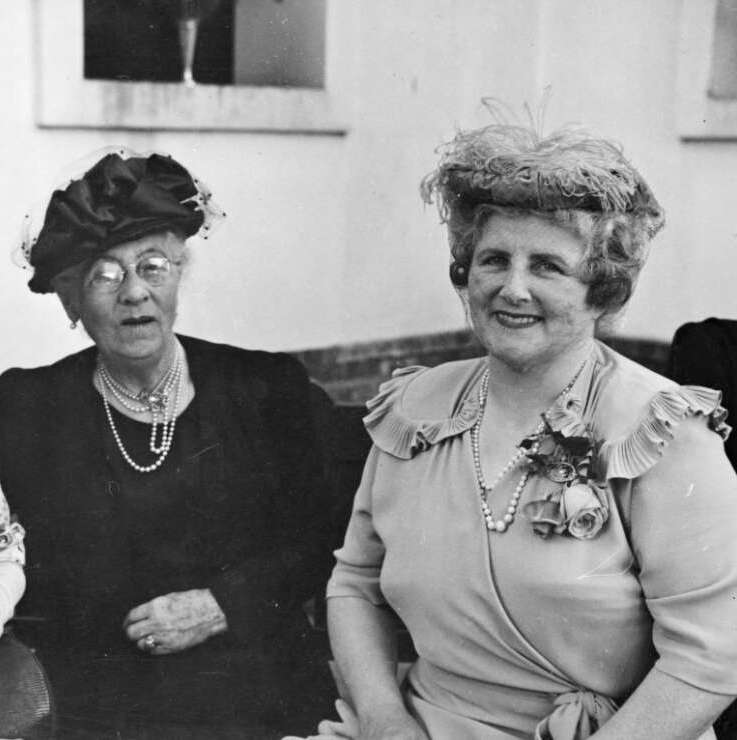
Dame Mary Hughes and Dame Enid Lyons (pictured together in 1955) are among the longest-serving prime ministers' wives, both holding the position for more than seven years.

With a few exceptions, the prime minister's spouse has been by default a public figure, and the subject of media and societal interest. A spouse has no official title, but may be unofficially referred to as Australia's "first lady" or "first bloke". (Note: The only male (as of December 2025), Tim Mathieson, was sometimes referred to as the "first bloke".) The prime minister's spouse receives no official salary, and they have no official responsibilities, duties, obligations or staff.

By convention, the spouse of the prime minister serves as the host of The Lodge, the primary official residence of the prime minister, and Kirribilli House, the secondary residence. The incumbent also assists the prime minister in welcoming foreign dignitaries to Parliament House, on official state visits overseas and at various other locations during ceremonial events.

Some earlier spouses stayed mainly at home and took little part in public life. Many were preoccupied with rearing children, most notably Dame Enid Lyons (1932–39), who had 12 children (one died in infancy).

However, most recent prime ministers' spouses have chosen to also be involved in charities or community organisations, working to raise public awareness, funds, and support for a range of causes. They generally assist their partners in political campaigns and participate in official duties that come with the position, such as hosting foreign dignitaries and, in particular, entertaining the spouses of dignitaries; accompanying the prime ministers on national and international trips; attending conferences and functions; and speaking in public, particularly in the prime minister's constituency. They have attended the opening of Parliament; visited Buckingham Palace, the White House, or the Japanese Imperial Palace; and been present at royal coronations and conferences.

== Careers and public office ==
Until the 1960s, it was uncommon for the spouse of a prime minister to have their own career. Zara Holt, a fashion designer, was the first to continue her career during her husband's term in office, and reputedly earned more money than him. Other businesswomen to hold the position have included Thérèse Rein, who ran an employment services company, and Margie Abbott, who ran a childcare centre. Bettina Gorton was an academic who lectured part-time at the Australian National University.

Although spouses often assist the prime minister at campaign events, only two have held public office in their own right:

- Enid Lyons became the first woman elected to the House of Representatives, several years after her husband's death in office. She was later appointed a junior minister in the Menzies government from 1949 to 1951.
- Lucy Turnbull was Lord Mayor of Sydney over a decade before her husband became prime minister.
- Ethel Page held senior offices in the organisational wing of the Country Party.

== Marital status ==
All prime ministers excluding John McEwen, Julia Gillard and Anthony Albanese were married for the duration of their term in office. McEwen was a widower during his short term; Gillard was in a domestic partnership with Tim Mathieson. Albanese was divorced when he became prime minister, but married while in office, making him both the first divorced prime minister and the first prime minister to marry while in office. He and his partner, Jodie Haydon, who lives in her own home in Sydney, became engaged on Valentine's Day 2024. They married on 29 November 2025, seven months after the 2025 Australian federal election.

== Official recognition ==
Some prime ministers' spouses have received official recognition for their services to the community:

- Flora Reid, Mary Cook, Mary Hughes, Enid Lyons, Pattie Menzies, and Zara Holt were given damehoods.
- Pattie Deakin accepted the award of Commander of the Order of the British Empire (CBE) in 1934, to be announced in the New Year's Honours of 1935; she died two days before the announcement.
- Margaret Whitlam, Tamie Fraser and Hazel Hawke were made officers of the Order of Australia. Lucy Turnbull was appointed an officer of the order before her husband became prime minister.
- Tamie Fraser was the first spouse of a prime minister to be provided with an official secretary for dealing with her correspondence.

== Exhibition ==
In June 2006, an exhibition entitled Mrs Prime Minister — Public Image, Private Lives, featuring the wives of 24 prime ministers, opened at Old Parliament House in Canberra, from 1901 to the present. The exhibition featured 150 objects and images, and was centred around six core themes, which included "social advocate, political partner, national hostess, and media personality". It also revealed how individual women had changed the role over time. A travelling version of the exhibition was created, which by then had grown to 25 wives, and featured portraits of six of them. On 19 March 2008, Annita van Iersel, former spouse of Paul Keating, opened the travelling exhibition, which featured portraits of Van Iersel along with Janette Howard, Hazel Hawke, Tamie Fraser, Margaret Whitlam, and Sonia McMahon.

As of August 2025, the exhibition showcases 26 women who had been wives to prime ministers between 1901 and 2010.

== List of spouses or partners ==
No.	Portrait	Spouse or partner	Tenure	Length of tenure	Prime minister
1		Jane Barton; 11 June 1851 – 23 March 1938 (aged 86)	1 January 1901 – 24 September 1903	2 years, 8 months and 23 days	Barton m. 1877
2	Portrait of Pattie Deakin	Pattie Deakin; 1 January 1863 – 30 December 1934 (aged 71)	24 September 1903 – 27 April 1904	7 months and 3 days	Deakin m. 1882
3		Ada Watson; 4 February 1855 – 19 July 1921 (aged 66)	27 April 1904 – 18 August 1904	3 months and 22 days	Watson m. 1889
4	Portrait of Flora Reid	Flora Reid; 10 November 1867 – 1 September 1950 (aged 82)	18 August 1904 – 5 July 1905	10 months and 17 days	Reid m. 1891
(2)	Portrait of Pattie Deakin	Pattie Deakin; 1 January 1863 – 30 December 1934 (aged 71)	5 July 1905 – 13 November 1908	3 years, 4 months and 8 days	Deakin m. 1882
5	Portrait of Margaret Fisher	Margaret Fisher; 4 July 1874 – 15 June 1958 (aged 83)	13 November 1908 – 2 June 1909	6 months and 20 days	Fisher m. 1901
(2)	Portrait of Pattie Deakin	Pattie Deakin; 1 January 1863 – 30 December 1934 (aged 71)	2 June 1909 – 29 April 1910	10 months and 27 days	Deakin m. 1882
(5)	Portrait of Margaret Fisher	Margaret Fisher; 4 July 1874 – 15 June 1958 (aged 83)	29 April 1910 – 24 June 1913	3 years, 1 month and 26 days	Fisher m. 1901
6	Portrait of Mary Cook	Mary Cook; 1863 – 24 September 1950 (aged 86–87)	24 June 1913 – 17 September 1914	1 year, 2 months and 24 days	Cook m. 1885
(5)	Portrait of Margaret Fisher	Margaret Fisher; 4 July 1874 – 15 June 1958 (aged 83)	17 September 1914 – 27 October 1915	1 year, 1 month and 10 days	Fisher m. 1901
7	Portrait of Mary Hughes	Mary Hughes; 6 June 1874 – 2 April 1958 (aged 83)	27 October 1915 – 9 February 1923	7 years, 3 months and 13 days	Hughes m. 1911
8	Ethel Bruce	Ethel Bruce; 25 May 1879 – 16 March 1967 (aged 88)	9 February 1923 – 22 March 1929	6 years, 1 month and 13 days	Bruce m. 1913
9	Sarah Scullin	Sarah Scullin; 21 April 1880 – 31 May 1962 (aged 82)	22 March 1929 – 6 January 1932	2 years, 9 months and 15 days	Scullin m. 1907
10	Portrait of Enid Lyons	Enid Lyons; GBE; 19 July 1897 – 2 September 1981 (aged 84)	6 January 1932 – 7 April 1939	7 years, 3 months and 1 day	Lyons m. 1915
11	Portrait of Ethel Page	Ethel Page; 20 September 1875 – 26 May 1958 (aged 82)	7 April 1939 – 26 April 1939	19 days	Page m. 1906
12	Portrait of Pattie Menzies	Pattie Menzies; 2 March 1899 – 30 August 1995 (aged 96)	26 April 1939 – 29 August 1941	2 years, 4 months and 3 days	Menzies m. 1920
13	Ilma Fadden	Ilma Fadden; 2 April 1895 – 14 May 1987 (aged 92)	29 August 1941 – 7 October 1941	1 month and 8 days	Fadden m. 1916
14	Portrait of Elsie Curtin	Elsie Curtin; 4 October 1890 – 24 June 1975 (aged 84)	7 October 1941 – 5 July 1945	3 years, 8 months and 28 days	Curtin m. 1921
15	Vera Forde	Vera Forde; 31 December 1894 – 9 November 1967 (aged 72)	5 July 1945 – 13 July 1945	8 days	Forde m. 1925
16	Portrait of Lizzie Chifley	Elizabeth Chifley; 1 August 1886 – 9 September 1962 (aged 76)	13 July 1945 – 19 December 1949	4 years, 5 months and 6 days	Chifley m. 1914
(12)		Pattie Menzies; GBE; 2 March 1899 – 30 August 1995 (aged 96)	19 December 1949 – 26 January 1966	16 years, 1 month and 7 days	Menzies m. 1920
17	Portrait of Zara Holt	Zara Holt; 10 March 1909 – 14 June 1989 (aged 80)	26 January 1966 – 17 December 1967	1 year, 10 months and 21 days	Holt m. 1946
	None		17 December 1967 – 10 January 1968	24 days	McEwen; Widower
18	Portrait of Bettina Gorton	Bettina Gorton; 23 June 1915 – 2 October 1983 (aged 68)	10 January 1968 – 10 March 1971	3 years and 2 months	Gorton m. 1935
19	Portrait of Sonia McMahon	Sonia McMahon; 1 August 1932 – 2 April 2010 (aged 77)	10 March 1971 – 5 December 1972	1 year, 8 months and 25 days	McMahon m. 1965
20	Portrait of Margaret Whitlam	Margaret Whitlam; AO; 19 November 1919 – 17 March 2012 (aged 92)	5 December 1972 – 11 November 1975	2 years, 11 months and 6 days	Whitlam m. 1942
21	Portrait of Tamie Fraser	Tamie Fraser; 28 February 1936 (aged 90)	11 November 1975 – 5 March 1983	7 years, 3 months and 22 days	Fraser m. 1956
22	Portrait of Hazel Hawke	Hazel Hawke; 20 July 1929 – 23 May 2013 (aged 83)	5 March 1983 – 20 December 1991	8 years, 9 months and 15 days	Hawke m. 1956
23		Annita Keating; 5 October 1948 (aged 78)	20 December 1991 – 11 March 1996	4 years, 2 months and 20 days	Keating m. 1975
24	Portrait of Janette Howard	Janette Howard; 11 August 1944 (aged 82)	11 March 1996 – 3 December 2007	11 years, 8 months and 22 days	Howard m. 1971
25	Portrait of Thérèse Rein	Thérèse Rein; 17 July 1958 (aged 68)	3 December 2007 – 24 June 2010	2 years, 6 months and 21 days	Rudd m. 1981
26	Portrait of Tim Mathieson (with Julia Gillard)	Tim Mathieson; 1957 (aged 68–69)	24 June 2010 – 27 June 2013	3 years and 3 days	Gillard domestic partner
(25)	Portrait of Thérèse Rein	Thérèse Rein; 17 July 1958 (aged 68)	27 June 2013 – 18 September 2013	2 months and 22 days	Rudd m. 1981
27	Portrait of Margie Abbott	Margie Abbott; 1 February 1958 (aged 68)	18 September 2013 – 15 September 2015	1 year, 11 months and 28 days	Abbott m. 1988
28	Portrait of Lucy Turnbull	Lucy Turnbull; AO; 30 March 1958 (aged 68)	15 September 2015 – 24 August 2018	2 years, 11 months and 9 days	Turnbull m. 1980
29	Portrait of Jenny Morrison	Jenny Morrison; 8 January 1968 (aged 58)	24 August 2018 – 23 May 2022	3 years, 8 months and 29 days	Morrison m. 1989
30		Jodie Haydon; 1979 (aged 46–47)	23 May 2022 – Present	4 years, 5 months and 24 days (Note: As of 16 November 2026)	Albanese partner, then wife (m. 2025)

== Other marriages ==
A number of prime ministers have remarried after leaving office or had marriages that ended before taking office.

- Billy Hughes was in a common-law marriage with Elizabeth Cutts from approximately 1890 to her death in 1906. He had six children with her, and also raised her son from a previous relationship.
- Chris Watson married Antonia Dowlan in 1925, following the death of his first wife Ada in 1921. They had one daughter together.
- Earle Page married Jean Thomas in 1959, following the death of his first wife Ethel in 1958. She had previously been his personal secretary.
- John McEwen married Annie McLeod in 1921; she died in 1967, ten months before he became prime minister. He remarried in 1968 to Mary Byrne, who had previously been his personal secretary.
- John Gorton married Nancy Home in 1993, following the death of his first wife Bettina in 1983.
- Bob Hawke married Blanche d'Alpuget in 1996, after divorcing his first wife Hazel in 1994. D'Alpuget had previously been his biographer.
- Paul Keating divorced Annita Keating after leaving office. He has not remarried, though his domestic partner since 1998 has been Julieanne Newbould.
- Anthony Albanese is the first prime minister to have been divorced before being appointed, having previously been married to Carmel Tebbutt from 2000 until 2019.

== See also ==
- List of prime ministers of Australia
- List of prime ministers of Australia by time in office
- First Lady
- Viceregal consort of Australia
