= Ada Watson =

Spouse of the Prime Minister of Australia
- In role 27 April 1904 – 18 August 1904
- Preceded by: Pattie Deakin
- Succeeded by: Flora Reid

Personal details
- Born: Ada Jane Low; 4 February 1855 Bexley, Kent, England
- Died: 18 July 1921 (aged 66) Paddington, New South Wales, Australia
- Cause of death: Pneumonia
- Spouse: Chris Watson (m. 1889)

Ada Jane Watson (née Low; 4 February 1855 – 18 July 1921) was the wife of Chris Watson, the third Prime Minister of Australia.

== Early life ==
Ada Jane Low was born in Bexley, Kent, England, and arrived in New South Wales as a two-year-old in 1857. She was accompanied by her parents, William and Emily Jane Low, and siblings, Edward and Alice, as an "assisted immigrant" on the ship Light of the Age. Two further siblings, Adelaide and Agnes, were born in New South Wales in the years that followed the family's arrival and settling in Bathurst.

== Personal life ==
Low and Watson were wed on 27 November 1889 at the Unitarian Church, Liverpool Street, Sydney, shortly before he was elected to the New South Wales Trades and Labour Council. She was not involved in her husband's political career, except to support his decision to resign as Labor leader in 1907. She may also have been influential in her husband's later estrangement from the Australian Labor Party.

Watson died at her home in Paddington on 18 July 1921, from a bout of influenza that developed into pneumonia. She was buried at Waverley Cemetery.

Owing partly to her husband's brief term as prime minister, Ada Watson is possibly the least well-known of prime ministerial spouses in Australia. No photograph of her has ever been found.

Honorary titles
Preceded by Pattie Deakin	Spouse of the Prime Minister of Australia; 27 April 1904 – 18 August 1904	Succeeded by Flora Reid
