= Ethel Bruce =

The Right Honourable Ethel Bruce Viscountess Bruce
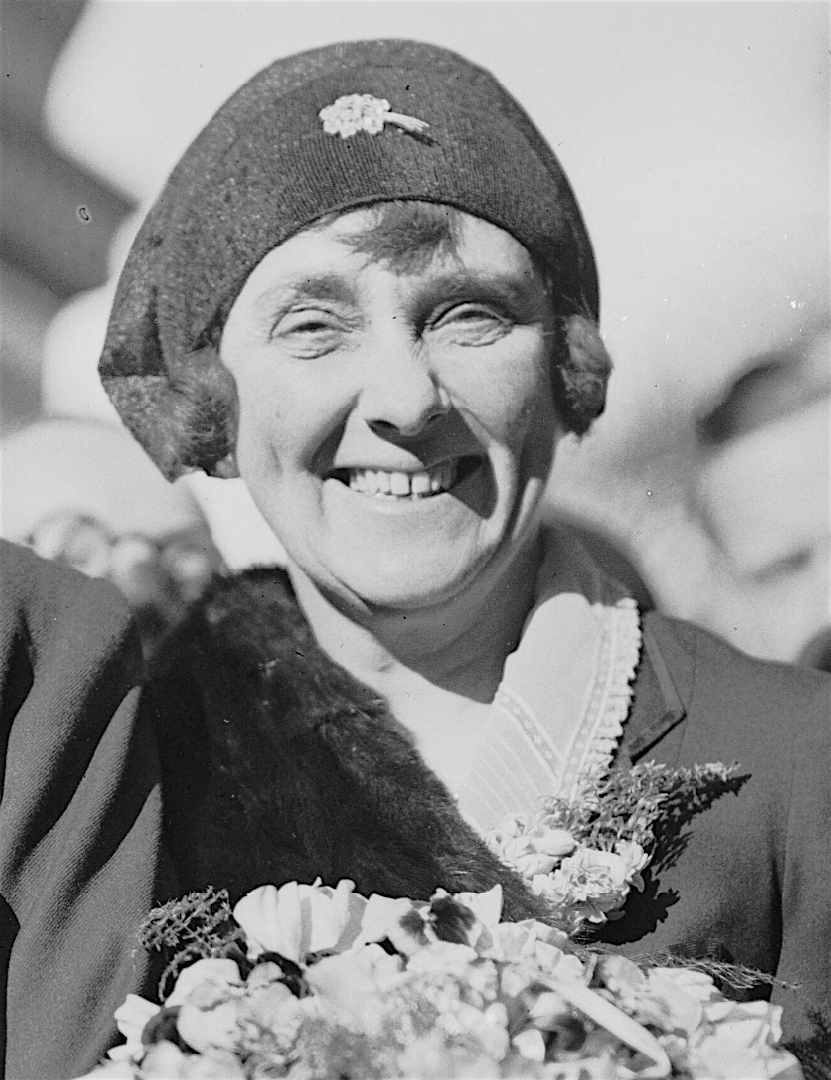

Spouse of the Prime Minister of Australia
- In role 9 February 1923 – 22 October 1929
- Preceded by: Dame Mary Hughes
- Succeeded by: Sarah Scullin

Personal details
- Born: 25 May 1879 Melbourne, Victoria, Australia
- Died: 16 March 1967 (aged 87) London, England
- Spouse: Stanley Bruce (m. 1913)
- Relations: Walter Manifold (uncle)

Ethel Dunlop Bruce, Viscountess Bruce of Melbourne (née Anderson; 25 May 1879 – 16 March 1967) was the wife of Stanley Bruce, who served as Prime Minister of Australia from 1923 to 1929. She was the first prime minister's wife to live at The Lodge.

== Early life ==
Bruce was one of seven daughters born to Elizabeth (née Manifold) and Andrew George Anderson, part of "a large family [...] with pioneer associations with western Victoria". She was of mostly Scottish ancestry, although she had an Irish grandmother. An uncle was Sir Walter Manifold, who served a term as President of the Victorian Legislative Council.

== Marriage ==
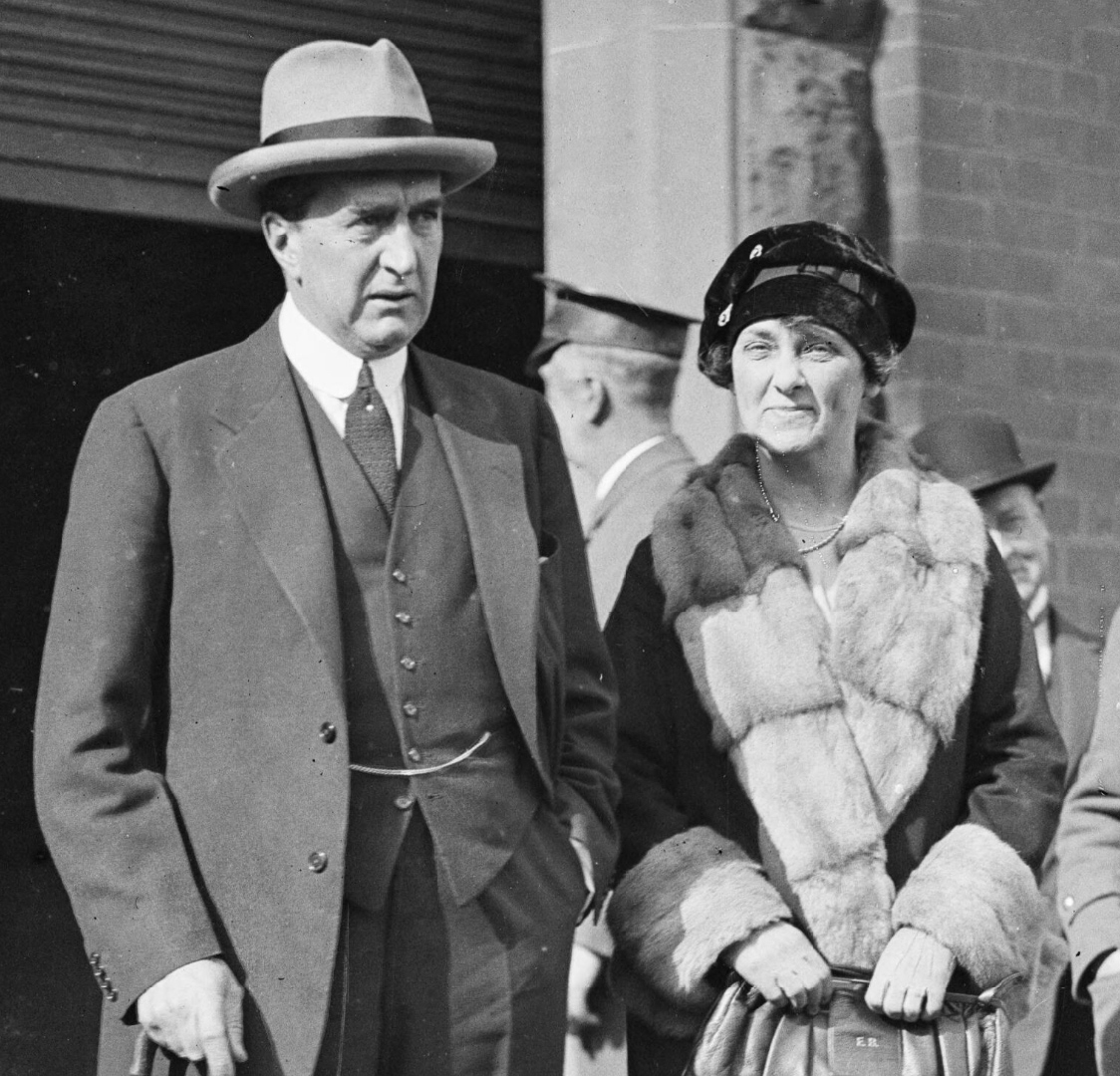
Stanley and Ethel Bruce in 1927

Bruce first met her future husband while at school; she was three years his senior. On a visit to England in 1912, she became reacquainted with him, and they were married on 12 July 1913 at Sonning-on-Thames, Berkshire. They honeymooned in North America, then lived in London for a period before returning to Australia in 1917 and settling in Melbourne. Bruce was "caring and completely devoted to her husband, and accompanied him on almost all his many journeys". The couple had no children, although Stanley's niece Lindsay often stayed with them.

== Public life ==
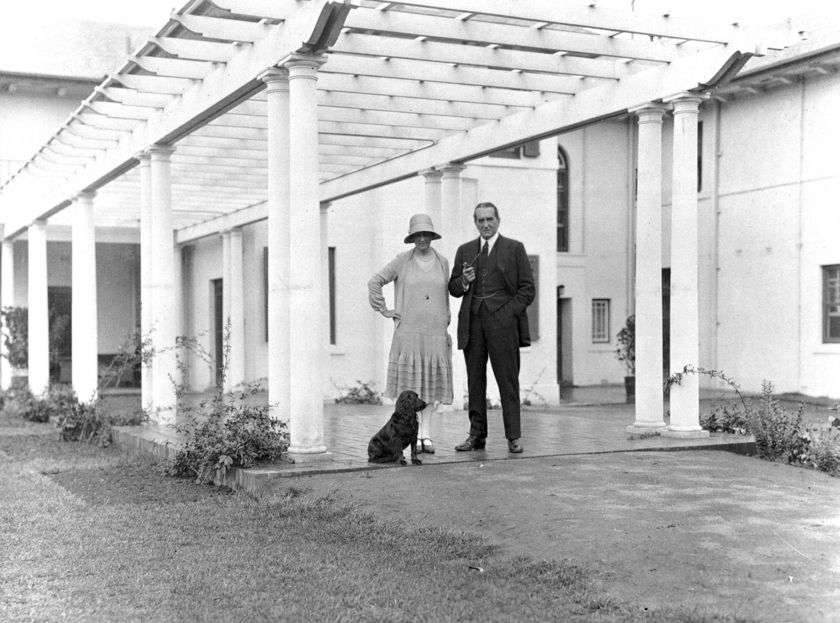
The Bruces were the first tenants of The Lodge.

Billy Hughes, Stanley Bruce's predecessor in the prime ministership, once told him that "you were the worst prime minister we ever had, but your wife was the best prime minister's wife". She and her husband were the first residents of The Lodge, which was completed in 1927 and intended to be only a temporary residence. Prior to the capital moving from Melbourne to Canberra, they had lived in Pine Hill, a 16-room mansion in Frankston. Bruce was viewed as devoted to her husband's career, but in a way that was "unobtrusive". Although she was involved with charities she generally kept a low profile.

After Stanley Bruce was appointed Australian High Commissioner to the United Kingdom in 1933, he and his wife lived in an official residence in Ennismore Gardens, South Kensington. She was seriously ill during their first years there, and spent time recuperating in France. In 1939, after the outbreak of war, they briefly relocated to a flat in Cranleigh, but soon moved back to South Kensington. Her husband's term as High Commissioner ended in 1945, but he then served a term as chairman of the UN Food and Agriculture Organization until 1951; he was elevated to the peerage of the United Kingdom in 1947. They remained in London in retirement, where they had a relatively small circle of friends, mostly couples with ties to Australia. They enjoyed the theatre and played bridge and golf, and took annual holidays in France, at Le Touquet in the summer and Nice in the winter.

Ethel Bruce was "frail and deaf" by the age of 80, and after a brief illness she died in March 1967 at the age of 87. Her husband viewed her death as "a loss beyond measure" and suffered a period of depression until his own death five months later.

Honorary titles
Preceded by Mary Hughes	Spouse of the Prime Minister of Australia; 9 February 1923 – 22 March 1929	Succeeded by Sarah Scullin
