= Margaret Fisher =

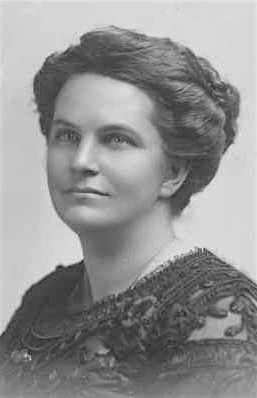

Spouse of the Prime Minister of Australia
- In role 13 November 1908 – 2 June 1909
- Preceded by: Pattie Deakin
- Succeeded by: Pattie Deakin
- In role 29 April 1910 – 24 June 1913
- Preceded by: Pattie Deakin
- Succeeded by: Dame Mary Cook
- In role 17 September 1914 – 27 October 1915
- Preceded by: Dame Mary Cook
- Succeeded by: Dame Mary Hughes

Personal details
- Born: Margaret Jane Irvine; 4 July 1874 Nanango, Queensland, Australia
- Died: 15 June 1958 (aged 83) London, England
- Spouse: Andrew Fisher (m. 1901; died 1928)
- Children: 6

Margaret Jane Fisher (née Irvine; 4 July 1874 – 15 June 1958) was married to Andrew Fisher on 31 December 1901. They lived in Gympie, Queensland in her husband's electorate of Wide Bay. However, when her husband was elected Leader of the Australian Labor Party in 1907 they were moved to Melbourne, at that time serving as the temporary seat of government of Australia. They bought Oakleigh Hall at Hughenden Road, [East St Kilda]. The house was a constant source of financial worry to Andrew Fisher. Unlike her predecessors as wife of the Prime Minister of Australia, she took part in political demonstrations. When she and her husband travelled to London for the coronation of George V she joined a large procession marking the progress of a bill intended to give British women the right to vote. At the Imperial Conference, also taking place at the same time as the coronation, Andrew Fisher was the sole Prime Minister from a labour party, making the Fishers somewhat of a celebrity with British Labour Party members of parliament led by Andrew Fisher's friend Keir Hardie. This also caused some embarrassment for Margaret. She attended a Labour Party dinner on the same night she and Rosina Batchelor were intended to be presented at court. Because of an error the two ladies were not told to leave the dinner in time to change into their court dresses and drive to Buckingham Palace. She was later dubbed by reporters the 'Yes, No Lady' after she failed to explain why she was presented some weeks later at Holyrood House. She had six children with her husband Andrew. Margaret Fisher died on 15 June 1958.

Honorary titles
Preceded by Pattie Deakin	Spouse of the Prime Minister of Australia; 13 November 1908 – 2 June 1909	Succeeded by Pattie Deakin
Preceded by Dame Mary Cook	Spouse of the Prime Minister of Australia; 17 September 1914 – 27 October 1915	Succeeded by Mary Hughes
