= Flora Reid =

Dame Flora Reid GBE
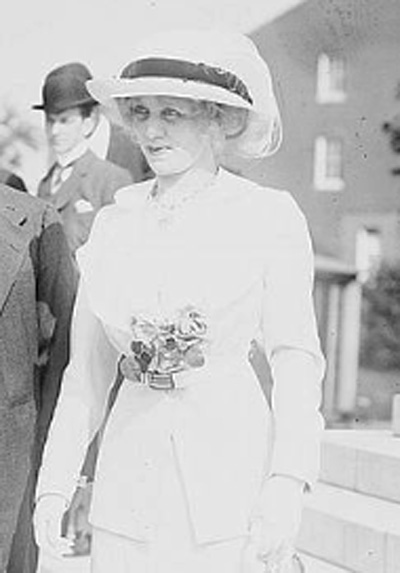
- Flora Reid, c. 1910

Spouse of the Prime Minister of Australia
- In role 18 August 1904 – 5 July 1905
- Preceded by: Ada Watson
- Succeeded by: Pattie Deakin

Personal details
- Born: Florence Ann Brumby; 10 November 1867 Longford, Tasmania, Australia
- Died: 1 September 1950 (aged 82) Rose Bay, New South Wales, Australia
- Spouse: George Reid (m. 1891)
- Children: 3
- Known for: Spouse of the 4th Prime Minister of Australia

Dame Florence Ann Reid, GBE (née Brumby; 10 November 1867 – 1 September 1950) was the wife of Sir George Reid, the fourth Prime Minister of Australia.

== Early life ==
Reid was born in Longford, Tasmania, the daughter of a farmer from the small settlement of Cressy. According to her future husband, her family was "extremely poor". At some point she moved to Sydney, where she at one point she was rumoured to be linked romantically with Bernhard Wise. She eventually became engaged to another politician, George Reid.

Flora Brumby and George Reid married on 5 November 1891 at the Presbyterian manse in Wangaratta, Victoria. She was 23 years old and he was 46. The marriage occurred in relative secrecy. Neither of them had any connection with Wangaratta, and no marriage announcement was made until August 1892, when a notice was placed in the Australian Town and Country Journal. George Reid told his journalist friend James Hogue that he did not want it published in the daily newspapers and that he wished to "settle down as quietly as possible"; he also implied that it had occurred recently rather than nine months previously. His wife's maiden name was given as "Bromby" on the marriage certificate, and George Reid incorrectly told Hogue that she was a relative of clergymen Charles and John Edward Bromby.

The couple had three children – Douglas, Thelma, and Clive.

== Public life ==
Reid was a vice-president of the Sydney Women’s Electoral League in 1899, along with Jane Barton. Her husband was prime minister from 1904 to 1905. Upon his first knighthood in 1909, she became Lady Reid (he had further knighthoods in 1911 and 1916). She accompanied her husband to London in 1910 on his appointment as the first Australian High Commissioner to the United Kingdom. According to George Reid's biographer W. G. McMinn, "there had been, at the time of his appointment, some doubts about Flora's ability to meet the challenge of London society; in fact she met it with ease". She hosted a reception for Theodore Roosevelt when he attended the funeral of King Edward VII, and put on weekly gatherings for "the wives and daughters of those [her husband] wished to influence".

== Honours ==
For her work in assisting Australian soldiers recuperating in London from World War I, she was appointed a Dame Grand Cross of the Order of the British Empire (GBE) in August 1917, being in the first list of appointments to the order, which had been created only in June 1917.

== Widowhood ==
Sir George Reid died in 1918, aged 73, and was buried in London. He left the whole of his estate to his "beloved wife as a slight recognition of her devoted love and help during the whole of our married life". Dame Flora Reid died on 1 September 1950 in Rose Bay, New South Wales, aged 82.

== Sources ==
- National Library of Australia: Papers of Sir George Reid
- New York Times, 25 August 1917

Honorary titles
Preceded by Ada Watson	Spouse of the Prime Minister of Australia; 18 August 1904 – 5 July 1905	Succeeded by Pattie Deakin
