= Pattie Deakin =

Australian philanthropist

Pattie Deakin CBE
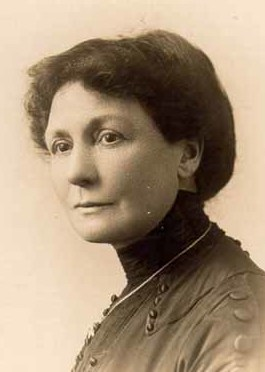

Spouse of the Prime Minister of Australia
- In role 2 June 1909 – 29 April 1910
- Preceded by: Margaret Fisher
- Succeeded by: Margaret Fisher
- In role 5 July 1905 – 13 November 1908
- Preceded by: Flora Reid
- Succeeded by: Margaret Fisher
- In role 24 September 1903 – 27 April 1904
- Preceded by: Jane Barton
- Succeeded by: Ada Watson

Personal details
- Born: Elizabeth Martha Anne Browne; 1 January 1863 Tullamarine, Australia
- Died: 30 December 1934 (aged 71) Melbourne, Australia
- Resting place: St Kilda Cemetery
- Spouse: Alfred Deakin (m. 1882–1919)
- Relations: Hugh Browne (father)
- Children: 3, including Ivy and Vera

Elizabeth Martha Anne "Pattie" Deakin CBE (née Browne; 1 January 1863 – 30 December 1934) was a leading advocate for creches, kindergartens and playgrounds in Australia. She was known for her philanthropic work. She was the wife of Alfred Deakin, the second Prime Minister of Australia (1903–04, 1905–08, and 1909–10).

== Early life ==
Deakin was born Elizabeth Martha Ann Browne on 1 January 1863 in Tullamarine, Melbourne. She was the eldest daughter and fifth of eleven children born to Elizabeth (née Turner) and Hugh Junor Browne. Her father was born in Scotland and arrived in Australia via the Colony of Natal. He established a successful distillery near Princes Bridge and was also chairman of the Broadmeadows Road Board. Her mother was born in England, the daughter of an Anglican clergyman. Her paternal grandfather was a Church of Scotland minister and married the daughter of the chief of Clan Matheson.

Browne grew up in East Melbourne. She was initially educated by a governess, and then from the age of 12 attended Grantown House, "a fashionable ladies' college [...] patronised by the Anglican establishment". She studied for matriculation but did not take the exams. During her childhood, her father left the Church of Scotland and converted to Spiritualism. He established a séance circle at their home and Pattie frequently served as medium. She also engaged in automatic writing. Her "extraordinary capacities as a medium" were recounted in two of her father's volumes, published in 1876 and 1888, and in Human Personality and Its Survival of Bodily Death (1903), a posthumous work by Frederic W. H. Myers. However, they were not common knowledge during her lifetime.

== Courtship and marriage ==
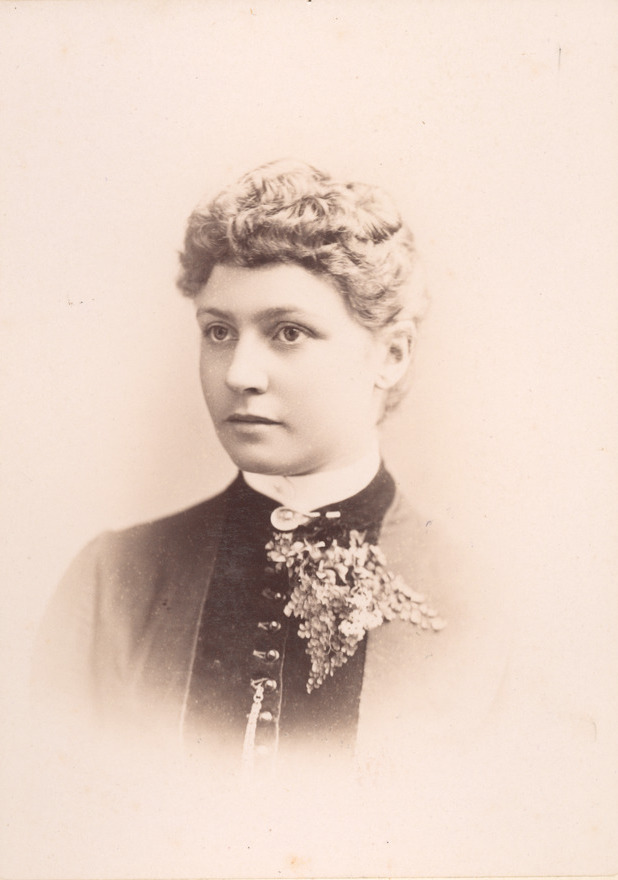
Deakin c. 1880

Browne first met her future husband Alfred Deakin in 1874, when she was 11 and he was 17. They were both attendees at the Melbourne Progressive Lyceum, the Sunday school for the city's Spiritualists. In July 1877, Alfred became her class teacher; he was also the conductor of the school band. He participated in a number of her séances. They danced for the first time at her coming-out ball the day before her 16th birthday. In 1879, both were elected "leaders" of the Lyceum. He began seriously courting her after her 18th birthday in 1881, and proposed marriage in July. Her father gave only qualified approval, concerned about Alfred's social standing and lack of independent means. According to family tradition, Pattie had also been courted by a wealthy 40-year-old baronet.

The couple married on 3 April 1882, despite attempts by her parents to delay the wedding. There was no religious service, only a civil ceremony, and her father did not pay a dowry. They honeymooned in Tasmania, then moved into Alfred's parents' house in South Yarra. They lived with his parents and sister Catherine for two years before moving to a new house, "Llanarth", built nearby on land bought by Alfred's father.

== Public life ==
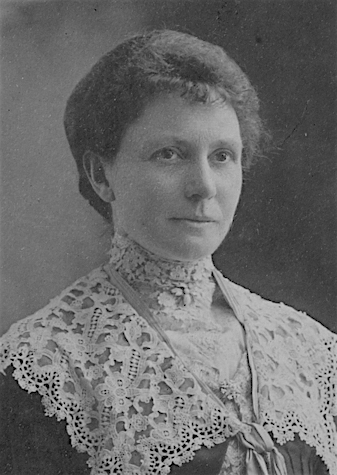
Deakin in 1904

In 1887 she was a member of the committee of the Queen's Fund. She also became president of the Victorian Neglected Children's Aid Society.

In 1907 she accompanied her husband to the Imperial Conference in London; while there she made her first public speech at the request of Lady Jersey, the wife of the former Governor of New South Wales the Earl of Jersey, to the Primrose League.

The same year, she chaired the nursery and kindergarten committee for the Australian Exhibition of Women's Work, held at the Exhibition Building. The popularity of the model crèche, which Pattie ran, led to the establishment of the Association of Crèches, of which she was the first president. The Free Kindergarten Union was formed similarly; Pattie was president of that too. Revenue from the exhibition helped form the Bush Nursing Association; Pattie became a member of the committee. For twenty years Pattie worked with the Melbourne District Nursing Society, first as president, and subsequently as a life vice-president. With her husband's aid she established the Guild of Play for Children's Playgrounds, which helped make play areas for children in inner-city suburbs.

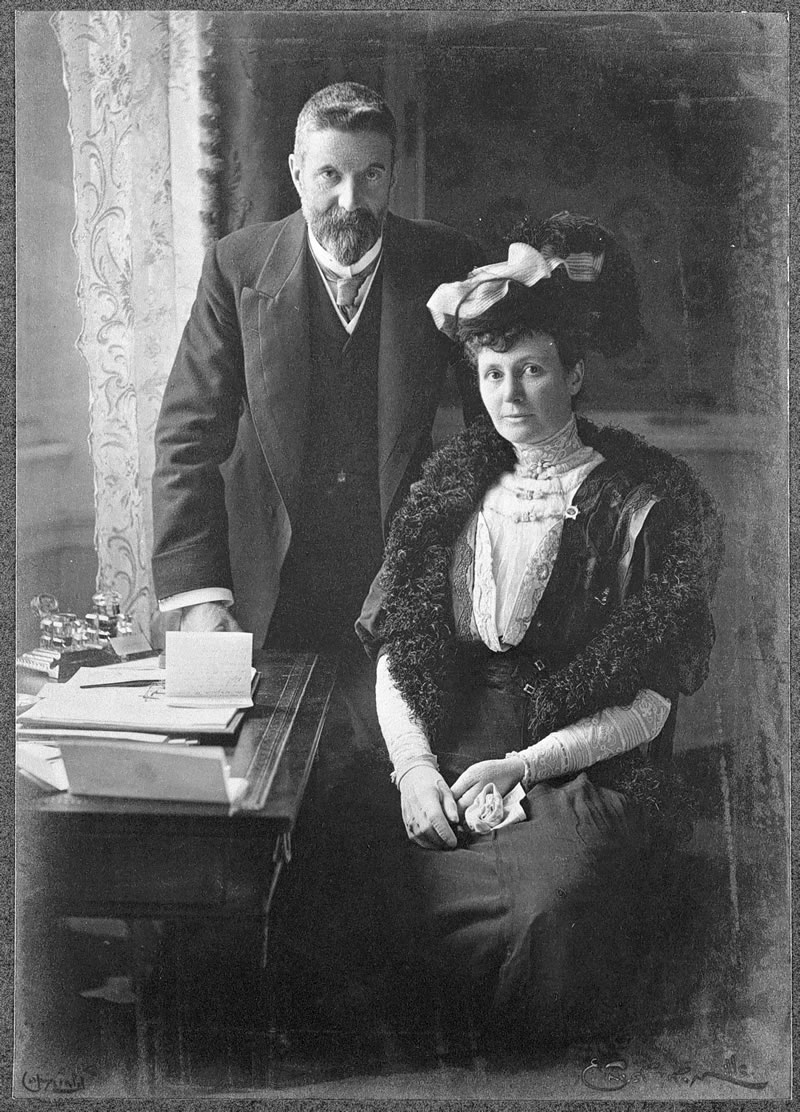
Alfred and Pattie Deakin

In 1909 she gained her St John Ambulance certificate with honours and was presented with the insignia of an associate of St John of Jerusalem. In 1912 she was invited to be president of the Lyceum Club. From 1915 to 1919 she set up and ran the Soldiers' Refreshment Stall, or Anzac Buffet, initially in a bell tent outside the No. 5 General Hospital on St Kilda Road, Melbourne. After World War I ended her philanthropic work continued. She became the first president of the Girl Guides and the only female member of the Australian Imperial Forces Canteen Fund Trust. She held this position until her death when her daughter Vera Deakin White took her place. She was awarded the Commander of the Order of the British Empire for her contribution to public life.

== Personal life ==
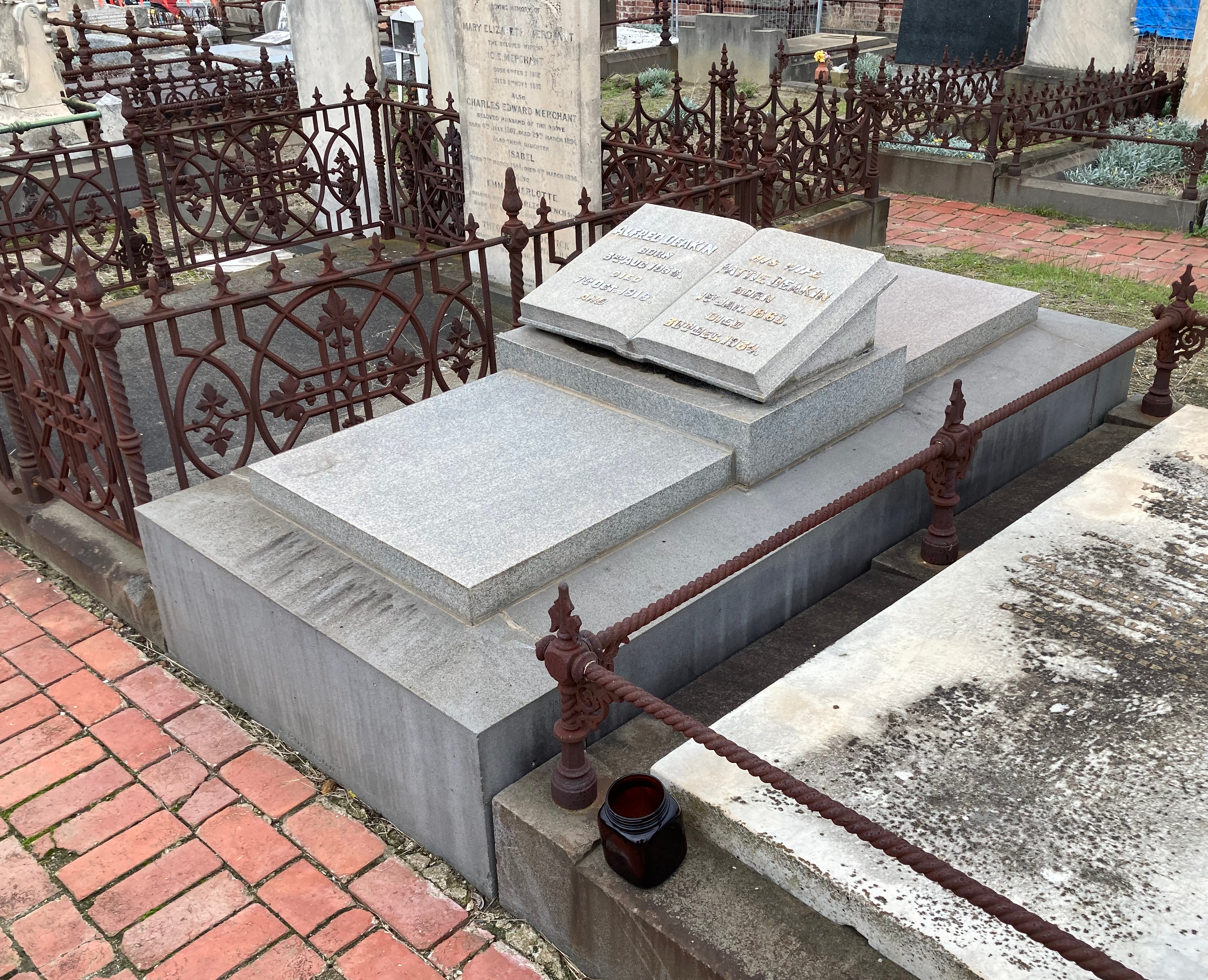
Graves of Pattie and Alfred Deakin at St Kilda Cemetery

Pattie and Alfred Deakin had three daughters:

- Ivy Deakin (1883 – 1970), married businessman Herbert Brookes
- Stella Deakin (1886 – 1976), married scientist Sir David Rivett
- Vera Deakin (1891 – 1978), married military officer and politician Sir Thomas White

She was widowed in 1919, and died on 30 December 1934. She was buried alongside Alfred at St Kilda Cemetery.

Honorary titles
Preceded by Jane Barton	Spouse of the Prime Minister of Australia; 24 September 1903 – 27 April 1904	Succeeded by Ada Watson
Preceded by Flora Reid	Spouse of the Prime Minister of Australia; 5 July 1905 – 13 November 1908	Succeeded by Margaret Fisher
Preceded by Margaret Fisher	Spouse of the Prime Minister of Australia; 2 June 1909 – 29 April 1910	Succeeded by Margaret Fisher
