= Jane Barton =

Prime Minister of Australia's wife (1851–1938)

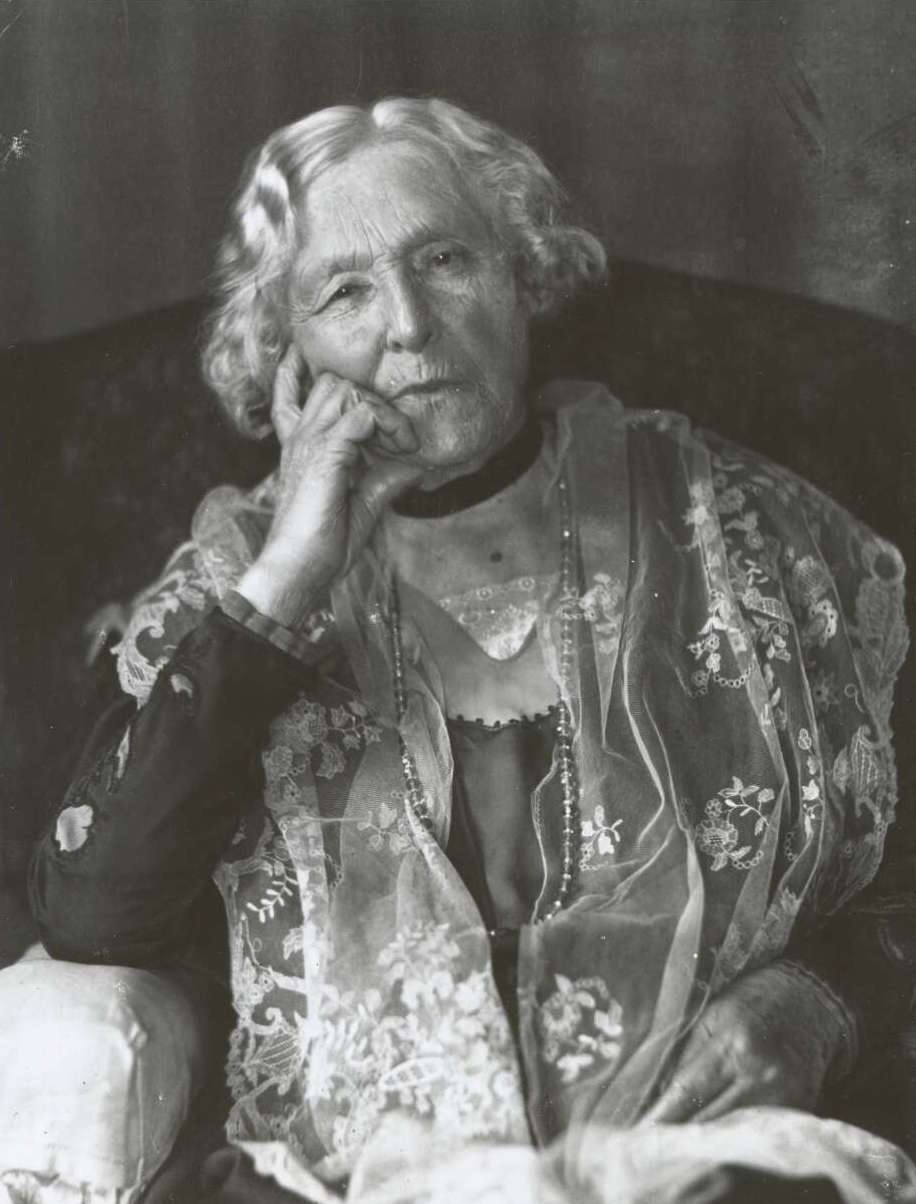
- Barton in 1930

Spouse of the Prime Minister of Australia
- In role 1 January 1901 – 24 September 1903
- Preceded by: Position established
- Succeeded by: Pattie Deakin

Personal details
- Born: Jane Mason Ross; 11 June 1851 London, England
- Died: 23 March 1938 (aged 86) Darling Point, Australia
- Spouse: Edmund Barton (m. 1877–1920)
- Children: 6

Jane Mason "Jeanie" Barton (née Ross; 11 June 1851 – 23 March 1938) was the wife of Sir Edmund Barton, the 1st Prime Minister of Australia from 1901 to 1903. After her husband's knighthood in 1902 she was known as Lady Barton.

== Early life ==
Jean was born in London, England, one of three children born to Catherine (née Horne) and David Ross. Catherine and David married on 17 Aug 1845 in Edinburgh. Catherine was the daughter of Jean/Jane Mason and Robert Horne. The family immigrated to Newcastle, New South Wales, when Jean was a small child. Her father was Scottish and a trained engineer. After losing money in mining investments, he became the licensee of the Albion Inn, a pub on Hunter Street. He was popular in the community and served as an alderman. His wife died soon after the family arrived in Australia, and the children were largely raised by their aunt Ellen (Helen) Horne, who lived with them.

== Marriage and children ==
Jeanie Ross met her future husband Edmund Barton in April 1870, when he visited Newcastle with the Sydney University Cricket Club. They were introduced by his friend Richard Teece. After he returned to Sydney, he sent her a copy of Alfred Tennyson's poem The Princess. She visited him the following month and was introduced to his parents, with an engagement following. However, for primarily financial reasons the couple did not marry for another five years. They eventually wed at St Andrew's Presbyterian Church, Newcastle, on 28 December 1877. She converted from Presbyterianism to Anglicanism for her husband, although she was more religious than him.

Once married, the Bartons briefly lived in Stanmore, but after a few months moved to a large house in Redfern so they could be joined by William Barton, Edmund's elderly father (d. 1881). For various reasons, they moved house approximately every two years until 1896 when they rented Miandatta in Carabella Street, North Sydney. This would remain their home for twelve years.

Edmund and Jane Barton had six children:

- Edmund Alfred Barton (29 May 1879 – 13 November 1949), a New South Wales judge
- Wilfrid Alexander Barton (1880 – 1953), first Rhodes Scholar for New South Wales
- Jean Alice Barton (1882 – 1957), married Sir David Maughan (1873 – 1955) in 1909
- Arnold Hubert Barton (3 January 1884 – 1948), married Jane Hungerford in 1909; he migrated to Canada
- Oswald Barton (8 January 1888 – 6 February 1956), a medical doctor
- Leila Stephanie Barton (1892 – 1976), married Robert Christopher Churchill Scot-Skirving in 1915

== Public life ==
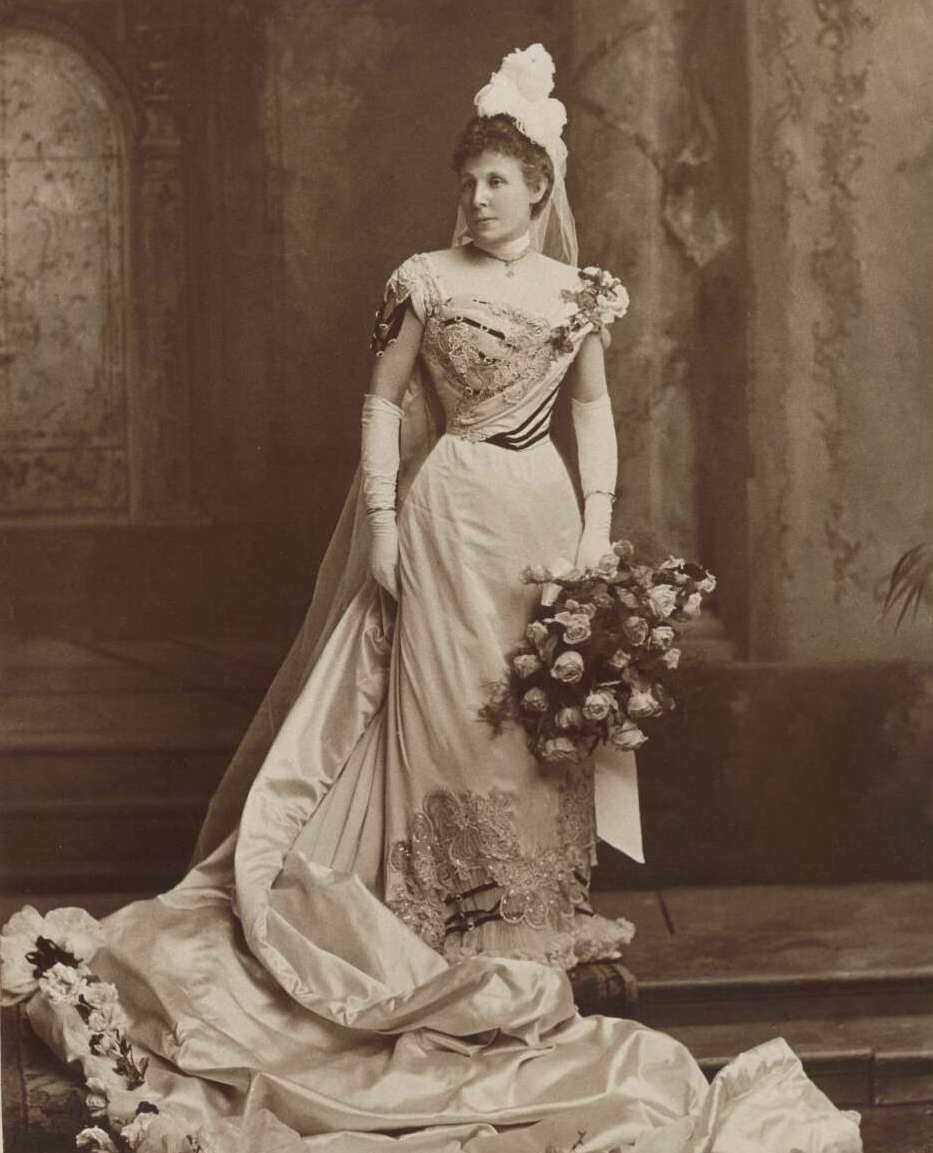
Barton in the dress she wore to the coronation of Edward VII in 1902

Barton was a member of the first committee of the Crown Street Women's Hospital. She shared her husband's enthusiasm for the federation movement, and served as a vice-president of the Sydney Women's Federal League. She was reportedly reluctant to speak in public. She was the hostess of her husband's open-house meetings on the subject of federation, whose attendees included prominent federationists like Robert Garran, Atlee Hunt and Thomas Bavin.

During Edmund Barton's term as prime minister, his wife and children continued to live in Sydney. There was no official prime minister's residence in the temporary capital, and "the prime minister's salary of £2,500 [...] was not enough to allow for Jeanie and their younger children to live with him while in Melbourne". She did accompany her husband to the 1902 Colonial Conference in London, and attended the coronation of King Edward VII; she was tasked with presenting Queen Alexandra with a possum-fur carriage rug as a gift of New South Wales. The Bartons took on daily social engagements during their visit, and were well received. According to Geoffrey Bolton, "the daughter of a Newcastle publican and the son of an unsuccessful Sydney stockbroker found themselves moving easily in a closed society intolerant of the parvenu or the ill behaved".

== Final years ==
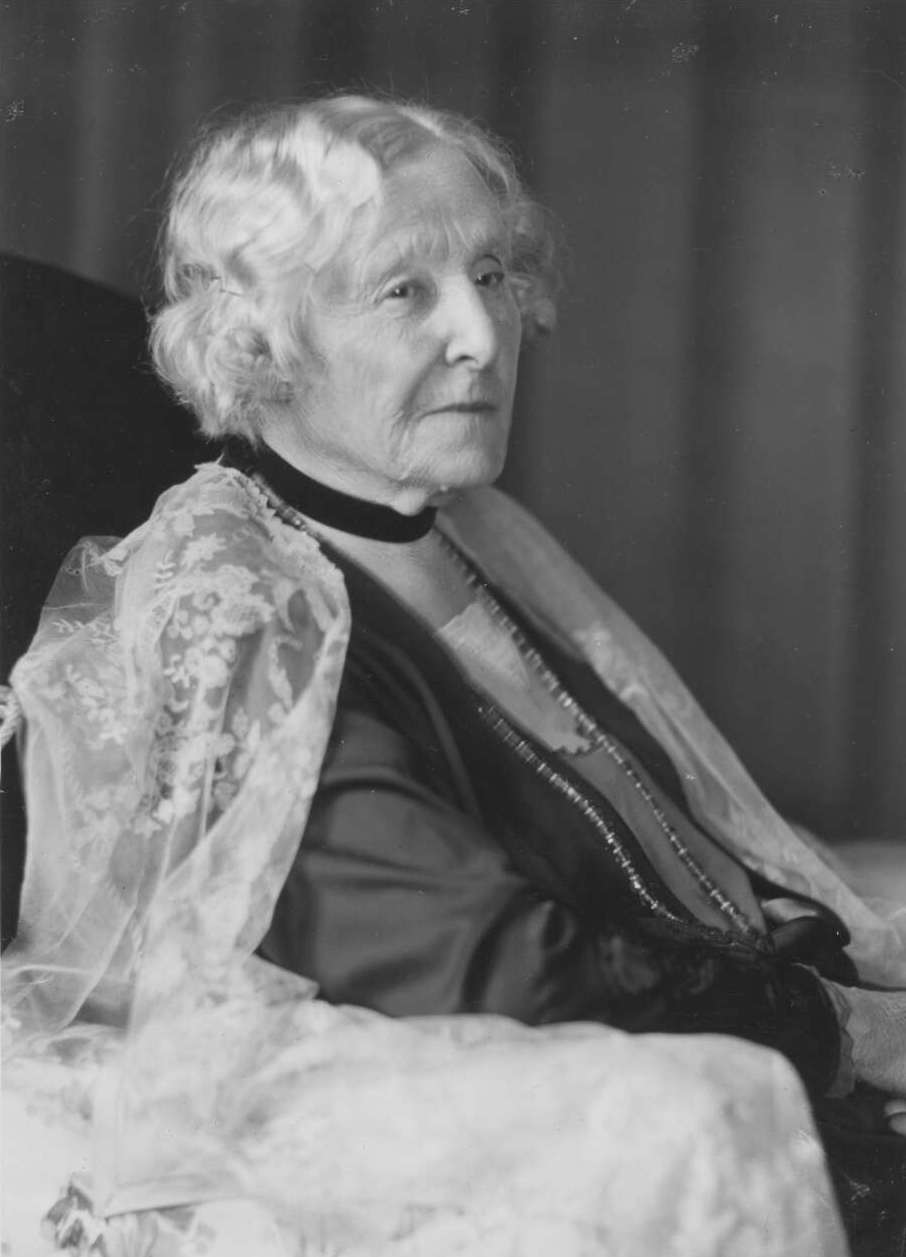
Barton in 1930, aged 78 or 79

In 1912, Barton was a founding member of the Queen's Club in Sydney, and was chosen as the inaugural club president. She was widowed in 1920, and from 1922 to 1927 lived in England with her son Wilfrid and his family. According to The Sydney Morning Herald, "one of her last appearances in public life" was at a 1935 service in Centennial Park marking the silver jubilee of King George V. She died at her home in Darling Point on 23 March 1938, aged 86, and was buried alongside her husband at South Head General Cemetery.

Honorary titles
Preceded by Position established	Spouse of the Prime Minister of Australia; 1 January 1901 – 24 September 1903	Succeeded by Pattie Deakin
