= Charles H. Foster =

American spiritualist medium

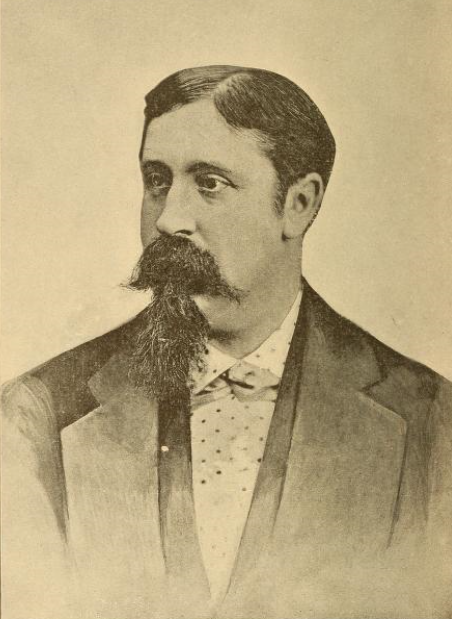
Charles H. Foster

Charles Henry Foster (1838–1888) was an American spiritualist medium.

== Career ==
Foster was born in Salem, Massachusetts. He became a medium as a young man producing in his séances a phenomenon known as "skin writing", alleged names of spirits would appear on parts of his body such as his arms or forehead.

He was also known for pellet reading. This involved séance sitters writing the names of the deceased on slips of paper that were rolled into pellets and put on a table. The pellets were mixed with blank slips. Foster would then select a pellet and without opening it, give the name of the deceased and reveal the name to his audience with a 'spirit' message. In 1863, The Spiritual Magazine reported that there was evidence Foster had faked his phenomena. The writing on his skin was said to be the same as his own handwriting. His pellet reading was also suspected of being fraudulent.

Foster toured Australia in 1874 and conducted seances. He influenced businessman Hugh Browne to adopt Spiritualism after purporting to make contact with Browne's deceased father.

Foster's biographer George C. Bartlett endorsed his feats as genuine, describing him as the "most gifted and remarkable Spiritual Medium since Emanuel Swedenborg". However, psychical researcher Hereward Carrington commented that most of the feats described in the book could easily be the "result of trickery... That Foster was an impostor there can be no doubt." Foster came into dispute with mentalist Washington Irving Bishop who claimed he could duplicate his phenomena.

== Exposure ==
Foster was exposed by John W. Truesdell in 1872. He noted that during séances, Foster who was a smoker would repeatedly light matches for his cigar. He suspected whilst doing this, he would approach the table, read the pellets and substitute them for blanks. According to Truesdell:

I noticed that the medium experienced fresh trouble in lighting his cigar. After several matches had been destroyed in this apparently fruitless attempt, Mr. Foster picked up one of the little paper balls, and slowly spelled out one of the names I had written, and, pointing it out, requested me to see if the spirits were correct. I did so, and, at the same time, seized the other five pellets, which proved, upon examination, to be every one of them a blank / So quickly did I accomplish this little piece of strategy that the medium scarcely realized his dilemma.

The professional magician R. D. Chater who attended séances with Foster also claimed to have detected his tricks. Chater observed his methods of concealing secret pellets between his fingers and substituting them.
