= Dame Mary Cook =

Dame Mary Cook DBE
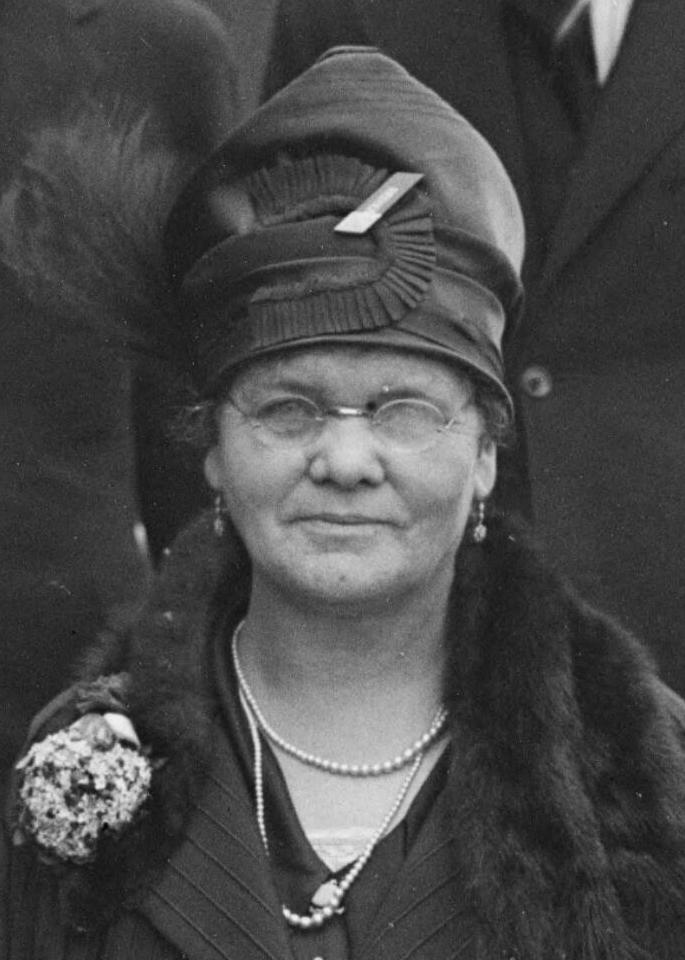

Spouse of the Prime Minister of Australia
- In role 24 June 1913 – 17 September 1914
- Preceded by: Margaret Fisher
- Succeeded by: Margaret Fisher

Personal details
- Born: c. 1863 England
- Died: 24 September 1950 (aged 86–87) Bellevue Hill, New South Wales, Australia
- Resting place: Northern Suburbs Memorial Gardens
- Spouse: Sir Joseph Cook (m. 1885; died 1947)
- Children: George Sydney Cook; Albert Cook; Joseph William Cook; John Hartley Cook; Annette Margaret Cook; Winifred Emmie Cook; Richard Cecil Cook; Constance Mary Cook; Raymond Fletcher Cook
- Occupation: Schoolteacher, humanitarian

Dame Mary Cook, Lady Cook DBE (née Turner; c. 1863 – 24 September 1950) was the wife of Australian Prime Minister, Sir Joseph Cook.

== Early years ==
Mary Turner was 22 years old and had been a schoolteacher for eight years when she married Joseph Cook in 1885. Beginning as a pupil teacher at Chesterton Girls' School, by 1885 she was an assistant mistress. Like Cook, she came from a Staffordshire mining family. She appears to have had a role in helping both her brothers and her husband to overcome their lack of education. At their Lithgow home, Cook studied in the evenings, moving from writing and grammar to typing and shorthand, and then to book-keeping. He began studying to become a Methodist minister.

== Emigration ==
By 1891, six years after their marriage and emigration to Australia, the couple had three small sons, and Joseph Cook had a seat in the New South Wales parliament. By 1901 they had six children, and he had won the Parramatta seat in federal parliament. For the 20 years he sat in the federal parliament, Joseph Cook spent much of his time in Melbourne, where parliament sat. Mary Cook managed their large household in Sydney, with eight children born between 1886 and 1906. Cook became Navy Minister in Billy Hughes' government in 1917. Mary Cook was by then very active in the New South Wales Branch of the Australian Red Cross Society, and in Cook's electorate of Parramatta. From the time of her husband's knighthood in 1918 she became Lady Cook and was styled in that way until seven years later when she was honoured in her own right as a Dame.

She spoke at meetings there in the 1919 election campaign, and also deputised at ministerial events, such as the unveiling of an Honour Roll dedicated to the 1914–18 servicemen and women in General Granville Ryrie's Manly electorate.

== London ==
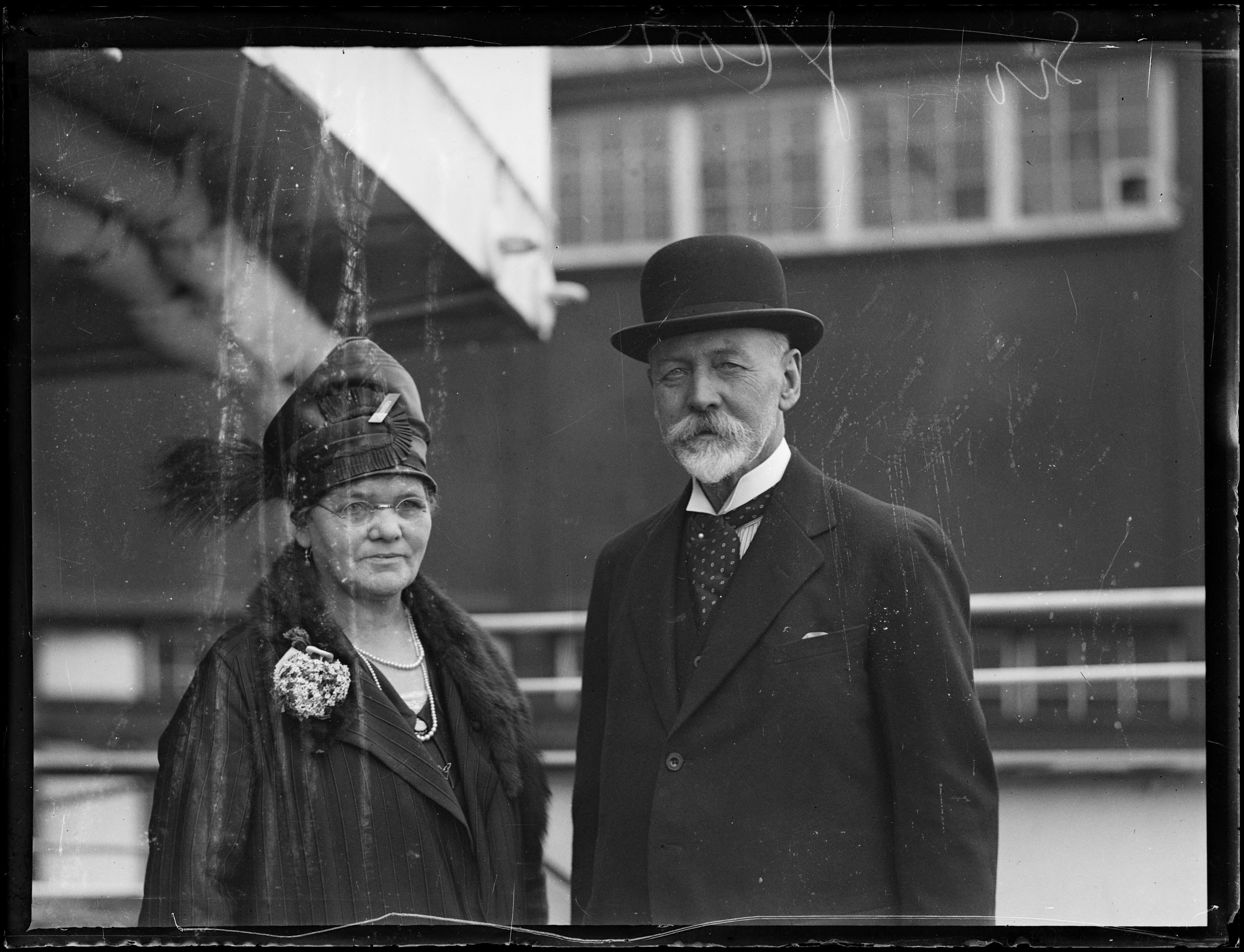
Cook and her husband some time in the 1920s

During her husband's term as High Commissioner, Mary Cook played a key role for the Australian Red Cross Society, including representing the Society at a meeting of the International Red Cross Board of Governors in Paris in 1923.

== Honours ==
Mary Cook's services to Australia were acknowledged when she was created a Dame Commander of the Order of the British Empire (DBE) in 1925 Birthday Honours List.

== Retirement ==
The Cooks returned to Australia in 1927, enjoying an active retirement. In 1928, on the foundation of the Newington College Parents' and Friends' Association, Dame Mary was elected president. In the first year of the association £300 was raised for equipment and improvements to the school's hospital. Four generations of the Cook family, including her son, Richard Cecil Cook, and grandson, Peter Cook, attended Newington.

== Death ==
Sir Joseph Cook died in 1947, and Dame Mary Cook died on 24 September 1950, aged 87, at her Bellevue Hill, New South Wales home. She was interred beside her husband at Northern Suburbs Memorial Gardens, North Ryde, New South Wales.

Honorary titles
Preceded by Margaret Fisher	Spouse of the Prime Minister of Australia; 24 June 1913 – 17 September 1914	Succeeded by Margaret Fisher
