= Richard Cecil Cook =

Australian judge

Cecil Cook
- Born: 2 March 1902; Marrickville, Sydney
- Died: 29 July 1977 (aged 75); Sydney
- Education: Newington College; University of Sydney
- Occupations: Solicitor, barrister, judge
- Title: The Hon. Mr Justice Richard Cecil Cook
- Spouse: Llois (nee Leonard)
- Children: John Richard Ross Cook
- Parent(s): Sir Joseph Cook and Dame Mary Cook

Richard Cecil Cook (2 March 1902 – 29 July 1977), was an Australian judge and a member of the Industrial Commission of New South Wales.

== Early life ==
Always known by his second given name, Cecil Cook was born in Marrickville, New South Wales, one of nine children of Sir Joseph Cook, a politician and Prime Minister of Australia from 1913 to 1914, and Dame Mary Cook. He attended Newington College (1912–1920) and the University of Sydney, where he graduated with a LL.B. in 1924.

== Legal career ==
After graduating Cook worked as a solicitor until 1928 and then read for the Bar. He was a barrister-at-law until 1954.

== Judicial career ==
Cook was appointed as an additional member Industrial Commission of New South Wales in 1954 and as a judge of the commission on 13 May 1955. He was a judge until his retirement on 1 March 1972.

== Wool trade report ==
In the 1950s, Cook was appointed by the Attorney General under the monopolies act to inquire into the wool trade.
