= Prime Minister's Suite =

Official suite of the Prime Minister of Australia at Parliament House

- Prime Minister Abbott hosts Indian delegation in the Suite, 2014
- Location of the Executive wing within Parliament House
- Building: Parliament House, Canberra
- Location: Executive wing
- Country: Australia
- Coordinates: 35°18′29″S 149°07′28″E
- Purpose: Official functions and receptions
- Owner: Commonwealth of Australia
- Operator: Department of the Prime Minister and Cabinet

The Prime Minister's Suite is an official suite within Parliament House, Canberra, used by the Prime Minister of Australia primarily for hosting official functions, receptions and other events associated with the office of the Prime Minister. It is one of the Australian federal government's designated official establishments and forms part of the facilities provided for the Prime Minister within Parliament House.

The suite is distinct from the Prime Minister's principal working office, which is situated in the Executive wing of Parliament House. The Executive wing accommodates the Prime Minister and other ministers, together with their staff and associated government offices.

The Prime Minister's Suite is one of four official establishments recognised by the Department of the Prime Minister and Cabinet, alongside The Lodge, Kirribilli House and the Prime Minister's Suite in the Commonwealth Parliament Offices in Sydney.

== History ==
=== Establishment of Parliament House ===
The present Parliament House was opened on 9 May 1988, replacing Old Parliament House as the meeting place of the Australian Parliament. Designed by Mitchell/Giurgola and Thorp Architects, the building incorporated a dedicated Executive wing at its southern end to accommodate the Prime Minister, ministers and their offices.

The provision of dedicated ministerial offices within Parliament House continued a practice established at the provisional Parliament House, where the offices of the Prime Minister and ministers were located within the parliamentary complex. The consolidation of executive offices within the new building gave the Executive wing a distinct organisational and architectural identity.

=== Official establishment ===
The Prime Minister's Suite is formally recognised by the Department of the Prime Minister and Cabinet as an official establishment. The designation reflects its role in supporting the official duties and representational responsibilities of the Prime Minister.

Unlike The Lodge and Kirribilli House, which principally provide official residential accommodation, the Canberra suite is primarily used for functions hosted by the Prime Minister.

== Location and layout ==
The Prime Minister's facilities are situated within the Executive wing at the southern end of Parliament House. This section of the building accommodates the offices of the Prime Minister and other ministers, as well as office accommodation for ministerial staff.

The Cabinet Room is situated nearby, on the ground floor, opposite the Prime Minister's office. It is the principal meeting place of the Australian Cabinet.

The Executive wing is separate from the parliamentary chambers and the public areas of Parliament House, reflecting the building's division between its legislative and executive functions.

== Functions and use ==
The Prime Minister's Suite is principally used for official functions and events hosted by the Prime Minister. These include:

- Official government functions, including receptions for visiting heads of government and other distinguished international guests.
- Receptions and dinners associated with the official duties of the Prime Minister.
- Functions involving ministers, parliamentarians, representatives of business and industry, community organisations and the media.
- Events associated with charitable and community organisations.
- Other official and private functions conducted in accordance with government guidelines.

The Department of the Prime Minister and Cabinet coordinates official government functions held at the official establishments, including events associated with visiting dignitaries and significant government business.

The suite also forms part of the facilities available to the Prime Minister for hosting guests and conducting official representational activities within Parliament House.

== Relationship with other official establishments ==
The Prime Minister's Suite is one of several properties and facilities designated as official establishments of the Australian Prime Minister.

Official establishment	Location	Principal purpose
The Lodge	Canberra, Australian Capital Territory	Principal official residence
Kirribilli House	Sydney, New South Wales	Official residence and functions
Prime Minister's Suite	Parliament House, Canberra	Official functions and receptions
Prime Minister's Suite, Commonwealth Parliament Offices	Sydney, New South Wales	Accommodation and sustenance during visits

The official establishments are administered under guidelines issued by the Department of the Prime Minister and Cabinet.

== See also ==
- Prime Minister of Australia
- Parliament House, Canberra
- Executive wing of Parliament House, Canberra
- The Lodge
- Kirribilli House
- Cabinet of Australia
- Old Parliament House, Canberra
