= Hazel Hawke =

First wife of Bob Hawke (1929–2013)

Hazel Hawke AO
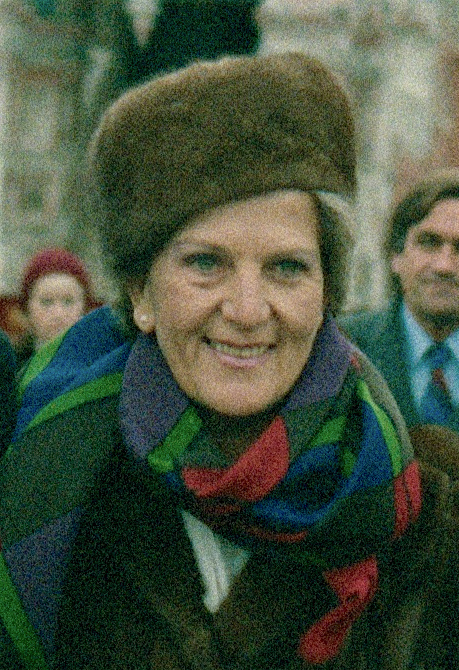
- Hawke on a visit to Moscow in 1987

Spouse of the Prime Minister of Australia
- In role 11 March 1983 – 20 December 1991
- Preceded by: Tamie Fraser
- Succeeded by: Annita Keating

Personal details
- Born: Hazel Susan Masterson; 20 July 1929 Perth, Western Australia, Australia
- Died: 23 May 2013 (aged 83) Hammondville, New South Wales, Australia
- Party: Labor
- Spouse: Bob Hawke (m. 1956; div. 1994)
- Children: 4

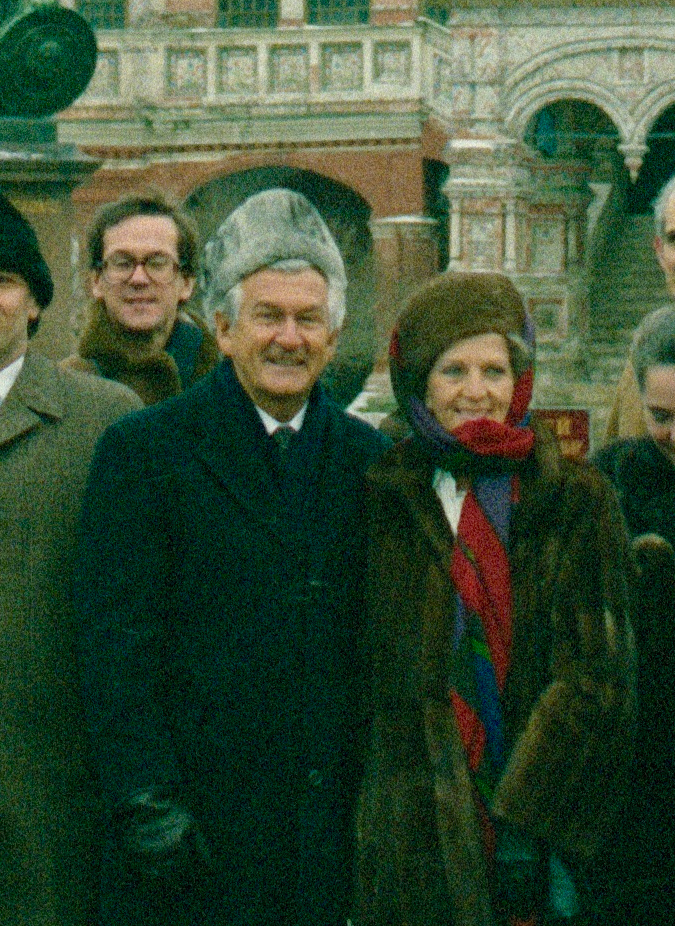
Hawke and Bob on their 1987 visit to the Soviet Union

Hazel Susan Hawke AO (née Masterson; 20 July 1929 – 23 May 2013) was the first wife of Bob Hawke, the 23rd prime minister of Australia. She married him in 1956, and supported him throughout his prime ministership (1983–1991); they divorced in 1994. She worked in social policy areas, and was an amateur pianist and a patron of the arts. After she was diagnosed with Alzheimer's disease, she made public appearances in order to raise awareness of the disease.

== Biography ==
Hazel Masterson was born in Perth, Western Australia, in 1929. She met her future husband Bob Hawke at a church fellowship in Perth. They married on 3 March 1956. They lived in Melbourne from 1958 to 1983, including during his term as President of the Australian Council of Trade Unions (1969–1980). Bob spent much of his time in Canberra after his election to Parliament in 1980. After he became prime minister on 11 March 1983, the family lived in The Lodge in Canberra, until Hawke was replaced as prime minister by Paul Keating in December 1991.

During their marriage, Bob Hawke had an affair with Blanche d'Alpuget in the 1970s. Hawke proposed to his mistress in 1978, but later withdrew the offer saying that a divorce from Hazel could cost Hawke three percent (3%) of the vote to elect the latter to a safe seat. D'Alpuget was initially so upset at Hawke's decision not to leave Hazel that she considered either assassinating him or taking her own life, but they reconciled and remained friends; so much so that she became his official biographer. From 1980 to 1982 d'Alpuget worked closely with Hawke in preparing his 1982 biography. In 1988 Hawke and d'Alpuget resumed their affair but he remained ostensibly committed to his wife during his prime ministership. After he left office in 1991, he and Hazel announced their separation and divorced in 1994. Hawke and d'Alpuget married in 1995. Bob Hawke formally apologised for the toll the divorce and subsequent remarriage took on the family.

Hazel had four children with Bob Hawke: Susan Pieters-Hawke (born 1957), Stephen (born 1959), Rosslyn (born 1960) and Robert Jr, who died in his infancy. Hazel and Bob also had an illegal termination before they were married to allow Bob the best chance of getting his Rhodes scholarship, which was only conferred to unwed candidates.

== Views and interests ==
Hawke acted as a prominent pro-choice advocate in Australia, often drawing on her personal experience of having an illegal abortion in 1952 so that her future husband Bob Hawke could further his education at the University of Oxford.

She wrote books, such as My Own Life: An Autobiography (copyright 1992) and A Little Bit of Magic: Thoughts For Women (copyright 1994).

Hawke was an excellent pianist. In 1990, she was one of the three soloists in Mozart's Concerto in F for Three Pianos and Orchestra, K. 242, the others being Duncan Gifford and Rebecca Chambers. They played at the Sydney Opera House with the Sydney Symphony Orchestra under John Hopkins. The performance was recorded and is currently available to purchase.

She was the inaugural Patron of the Kendall National Violin Competition, and later the Patron Emeritus.

Hawke was elected as a republican delegate to the 1998 Constitutional Convention.

== Honours ==
Hazel Hawke in the Lodge in the mid-1980s.

In June 2001 she was appointed an Officer of the Order of Australia. The citation read: "For service to the community, particularly through the promotion of the reconciliation process, support for continued improvement in the quality of children's television, as a contributor to the preservation of heritage items, and involvement with environmental and wildlife preservation groups".

== Alzheimer's disease and death ==
On 3 November 2003, the ABC aired an episode of Australian Story in which Hawke publicly revealed that she was suffering from Alzheimer's disease. Her family had noticed significant short-term memory loss, leading to the diagnosis in 2001. She had been reluctant to go public about the illness she called the 'Big A', but eventually did so to publicise a fund for supporting Alzheimer's sufferers that she had jointly set up with Alzheimer's Australia.

In 2004, Hazel Flynn and Hawke's daughter Susan Pieters-Hawke published a book, Hazel's Journey: A personal experience of Alzheimer's, describing the previous decade of Hawke's life and the onset of Alzheimer's. At the book launch on 1 November 2004, Pieters-Hawke revealed that her mother had reached the mid-stages of the disease and was now suffering from quite severe short-term memory loss. That year the Hazel Hawke Dementia and Care Fund was established. Hawke's granddaughter Sophie Pieters-Hawke launched an education kit for schoolchildren about Alzheimers in 2007.

In August 2009, she was placed in high level care. On 23 May 2013, she died from complications associated with the disease. She was 83 years old. Her family had been by her side in her last days. Public tributes were paid to her by the prime minister, Julia Gillard and the Governor-General, Quentin Bryce. A state memorial service was held for her at the Sydney Opera House on 25 June 2013, attended by five prime ministers (Hawke, Keating, Howard, Rudd and Gillard), the Governor-General, and a range of state leaders and other federal politicians.

== Sources ==
- Australia's Prime Ministers – Meet a PM – Hawke – Hazel Hawke
- Australia's Prime Ministers – Fast Facts – Hawke
- Australian Broadcasting Corporation (2003). Australian Story – The Big 'A'.
- Stephens, Tony (2 November 2004). "When love shone through the fog". The Age.
- Legislative Assembly for the ACT: 1998 Week 10 Hansard (25 November 1998) Pages 2927 and 2928 (a public pro-choice letter from Hazel Hawke)
- It's an Honour Australian Government (Retrieved 23 September 2007)
- "Hazel Hawke inspires mission". Herald Sun. Archived from the original on 9 August 2011.

Honorary titles
Preceded by Tamie Fraser	Spouse of the Prime Minister of Australia; 11 March 1983 – 20 December 1991	Succeeded by Annita van Iersel
