= The Lodge, Canberra =

Official residence of the prime minister of Australia

The Lodge
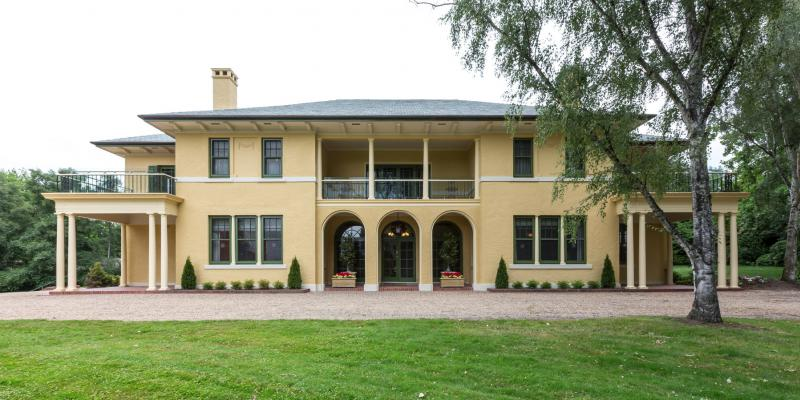
- Façade of The Lodge

General information
- Type: Official residence
- Architectural style: Georgian revival
- Location: 5 Adelaide Avenue, Deakin, Australian Capital Territory, Australia
- Coordinates: 35°18′39″S 149°07′00″E
- Current tenants: Prime Minister Anthony Albanese, when in Canberra
- Construction started: 1926
- Completed: 1927; 99 years ago
- Owner: Commonwealth Government

Design and construction
- Architects: Percy A. Oakley; Stanley T. Parkes
- Other designers: Ruth Lane Poole (interior)

Commonwealth Heritage List
- Official name: The Lodge, 5 Adelaide Av, Deakin, ACT, Australia
- Type: Listed place
- Criteria: A., B., C., D., E., F., G., H.
- Designated: 22 June 2004
- Reference no.: 105452

The Lodge is the primary official residence of the prime minister of Australia. Located at 5 Adelaide Avenue in the Canberra suburb of Deakin, it is situated a short distance away from Parliament House. The Lodge is one of two official prime ministerial residences, the secondary residence being Kirribilli House in Sydney. The building was completed in 1927 in the Georgian revival style and since then twenty-three people have served as prime minister, six of whom chose to live elsewhere either full- or part-time during their tenure, and two who chose to live at Kirribilli House.

== History ==
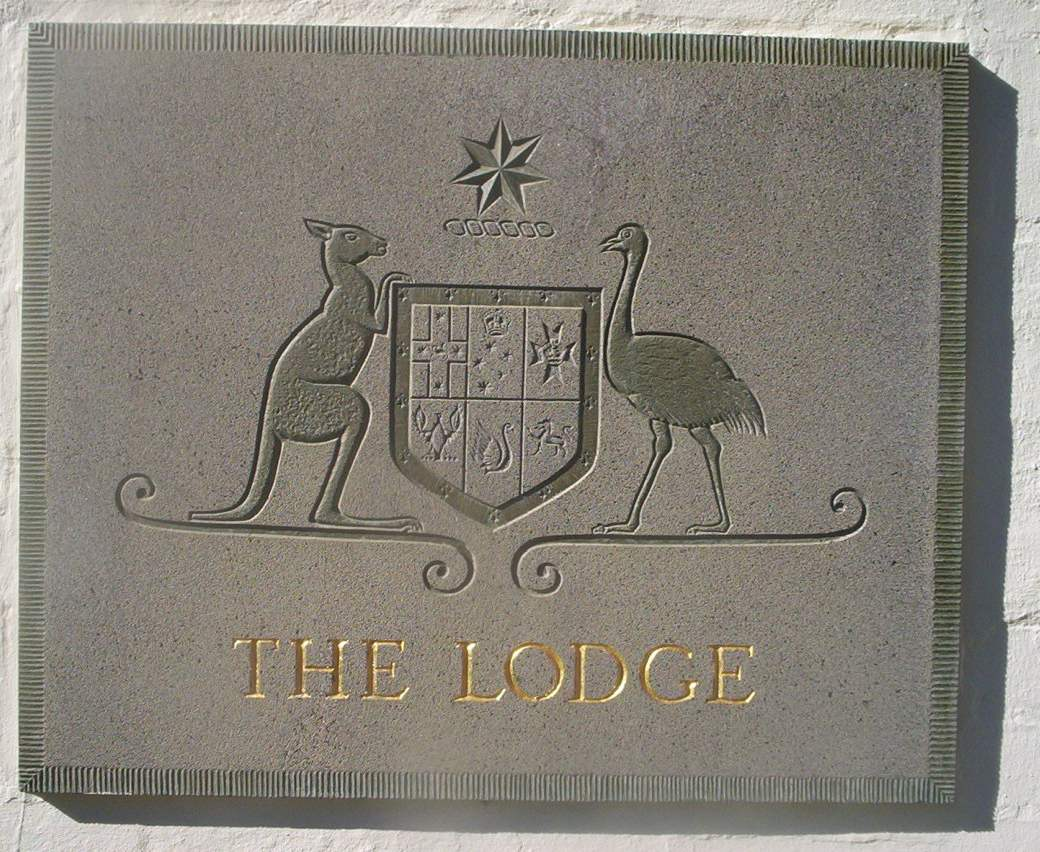
The sign on the front exterior wall of The Lodge

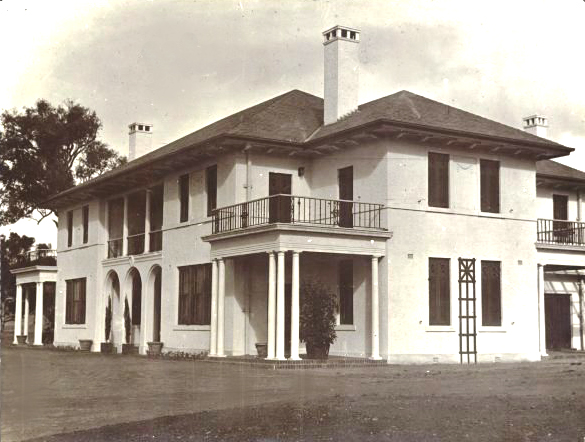
The Lodge, soon after completion in 1927

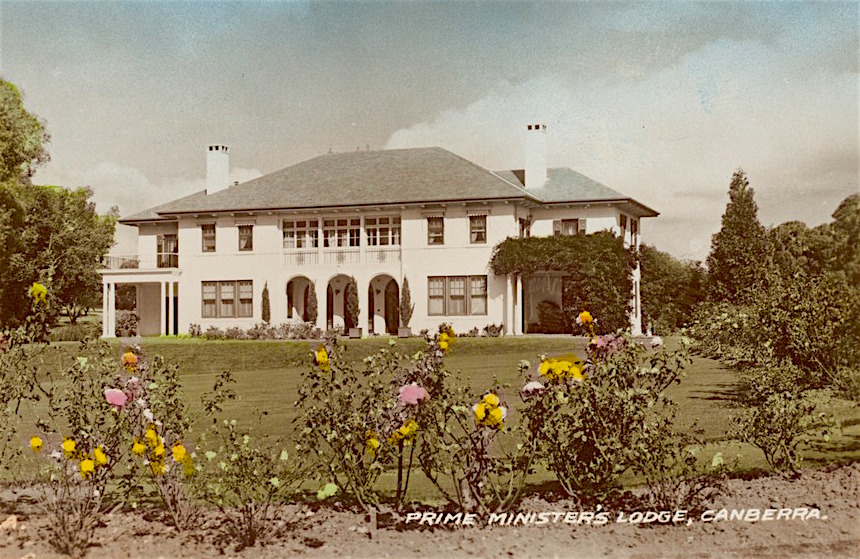
In the 1930s

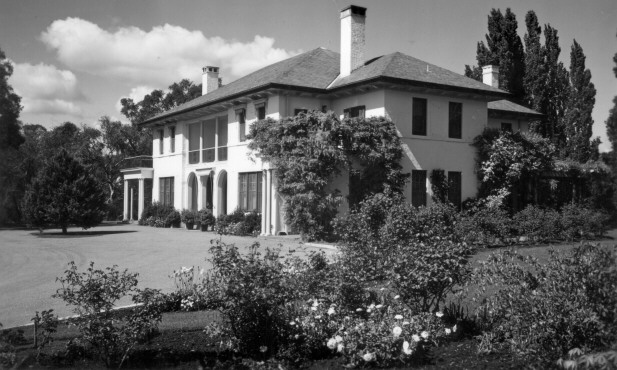
In the 1940s

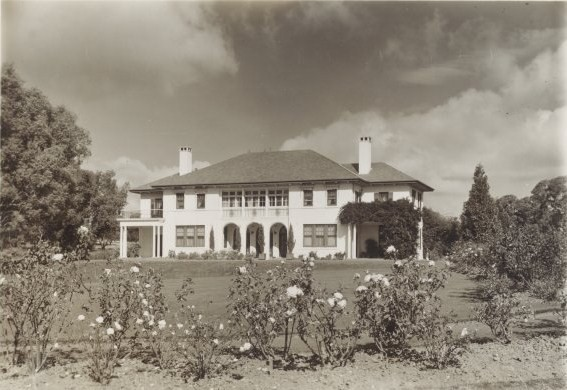
In 1950

The Lodge is a 40-room Australian Georgian revival style mansion, located on 18,000 square metres (4.45 acres) of landscaped grounds. The origin of its name is unknown. It was built as a temporary measure, to be occupied by whoever was the prime minister "until such time as a monumental prime minister's residence is constructed, and thereafter to be used for other purposes". The original "prime minister's cottage" was built in 1926–1927 at a base cost of £25,000 and an eventual total of "£28,319 (approximately $2,298,825 AUD in 2020), including the landscaping of 2.8 hectares of grounds, construction of a tennis court and croquet lawn, and furnishing and interior decoration". The architects were Percy A. Oakley and Stanley T. Parkes of Melbourne; the builder was J. G. Taylor of Sydney. Ruth Lane Poole of Melbourne was responsible for interior design and furnishing, as she had been for the governor-general's residence, Government House. The Lodge was intended as one of a set of three official residences, the others to be for the presiding officers of the Parliament of Australia (the speaker of the House of Representatives and the president of the Senate), but the others were never built.

The first prime minister to live in The Lodge was Stanley Bruce. He and his wife Ethel (they had no children) moved in on 4 May 1927, five days before the official opening of the Provisional Parliament House on 9 May. When he was leader of the opposition, Bruce's successor James Scullin (1929–32) had objected to the cost of running The Lodge and, true to his word, he and his wife lived at the Hotel Canberra (now the Hyatt Hotel) during his premiership. However the next prime minister, Joseph Lyons, chose The Lodge, and all subsequent prime ministers have used it as their primary place of residence, except for:

- Earle Page (1939), Frank Forde (1945), and John McEwen (1967–68), who served as caretaker prime ministers following the deaths of an incumbent.
- Ben Chifley (1945–49), who preferred the Hotel Kurrajong, where many Labor politicians of the era stayed.
- John Howard (1996–2007), who stayed at The Lodge when he was in Canberra for parliamentary or government business, but lived primarily at Kirribilli House, Sydney. The latter is a residence maintained for the official use of prime ministers when they need to perform official duties and extend official hospitality in Sydney.
- Tony Abbott (2013–2015), who served as the prime minister while The Lodge was being renovated. Abbott resided at an apartment at the Australian Federal Police training college when in Canberra.
- Scott Morrison (2018–2022), who stayed at The Lodge when he was in Canberra for parliamentary or government business, but lived primarily at Kirribilli House, Sydney. Morrison stated that this was to ensure that his daughters could continue to 'live as normal a life as is possible'.

When Julia Gillard became prime minister on 24 June 2010 after the parliamentary Labor Party decided to replace Kevin Rudd as leader, she declared that she would not move into The Lodge until she had "fulsomely earned the trust of the Australian people to be prime minister" at an election; instead, she remained living in her home in Altona in Melbourne and her flat in Canberra. Following the 2010 election at which Gillard led her party into minority government, she moved into The Lodge on 26 September 2010.

Of the three Australian prime ministers who have died in office, the only one to die at The Lodge was John Curtin in 1945.

In 2025, The Lodge hosted the wedding of sitting prime minister Anthony Albanese and Jodie Haydon.

=== Earlier prime ministers' residences ===
Melbourne served as the temporary capital from 1901 to 1927. During this time, there was no official residence for the prime minister. Edmund Barton, the first prime minister, initially lived in "a kind of bachelor flat" in the attic of Parliament House, Melbourne. This was remembered by James Drake as like a turret, "comfortably furnished as a writing room, and it opened into an equally small sleeping apartment with a bathroom adjoining". He retained a private residence in Sydney: 'Miandetta' at 67 Carabella Street, Kirribilli, from 1896 to 1906, and usually returned there when parliament was not in session. In May 1903 he instead moved into a suite at the Grand Hotel, which remained his residence until his resignation in September 1903. The second prime minister, Alfred Deakin, was a Melburnian and lived at his private residence "Llanarth" in South Yarra during each of his three terms as prime minister. He also had a holiday house, "Ballara", at Point Lonsdale. However, Deakin drew a distinction between his public and private lives and did not conduct official business at either of his homes. Chris Watson and George Reid both had their ordinary residences in Sydney, and stayed in boarding houses with other MPs during their short periods as prime minister; Watson's was in East Melbourne and Reid's was in St Kilda.

Andrew Fisher, who represented a Queensland seat, was the first non-Victorian prime minister to live permanently in the capital. In 1907 he purchased "Oakleigh Hall", a 13-room mansion in St Kilda East with 2.5 acres (1.0 ha) of gardens. He and his extended family and servants used it as their residence during his three terms as prime minister beginning in 1908 and 1915. He frequently received guests and conducted official business there, but was given no allowance for its upkeep. Joseph Cook and Billy Hughes lived primarily in Sydney, but Stanley Bruce was another Melburnian and resumed the tradition of prime ministers residing in the capital year-round. In 1926, the year before The Lodge was finished, Bruce built "Pine Hill", a 16-room mansion in Frankston.

== Description ==
The building's interior has an American Colonial character, with stained wall panelling and exposed upper-floor beams under the ceiling. The ground-floor entrance opens into an entrance hall. To the left of the entrance is the dining room and service wing, which includes staff quarters. To its right are the formal reception rooms—a drawing room, study, and sitting room/library (which was originally intended as a billiards room). The staircase rises to a landing which contains office space for the prime minister's spouse, then divides into two flights, leading to a hall opening onto a loggia above the entrance. On the first floor are the private apartments and guest accommodation, consisting of a study, six bedrooms, sitting room, a drawing room, and a billiards/games room.

== Renovations ==
=== Menzies, 1939 ===
In 1939 Robert Menzies' wife Pattie supervised a major refurbishment. The makeshift children's bedrooms on the front balcony, built for the large Lyons family, were removed. Worn carpets and furnishings were replaced and kerosene heaters installed.

=== Holt, 1966 ===
Harold Holt's wife Zara Holt also organised a major makeover. All the curtains and carpets were discarded. The floors were re-covered with a dramatic emerald green carpet. The tall, arched windows of the entrance were draped with crisp white curtains. A flagpole flying the Australian flag was installed on the stair landing. Most controversial of all was the extensive work needed to transform the dark varnished Tasmanian mountain ash panelling of the walls of all three rooms. Once the stripping was completed, the walls were coated with a white gloss paint. These bright walls remained the backdrop of formal photographs at The Lodge for the next five prime ministers.

=== Gorton, 1968 ===
John Gorton's wife Bettina had practical skills in farm repairs which were soon called on to deal with maintenance issues resulting from some of Zara Holt's decorating shortcomings. Repairs to a leaking ceiling that threatened the silk wallpaper in the 'Swan Suite', and toning down some of the more vibrant colours in furnishings and finishes, were among the tasks she undertook. But Bettina Gorton's lasting imprint on The Lodge was in the grounds. During the Gortons' tenure, a wall was built surrounding The Lodge, both as a security measure and to give some privacy from the encroaching traffic of Adelaide Avenue on the eastern side of the residence. Once the wall was completed, Bettina Gorton developed a garden of Australian native plants. The Gortons also installed a swimming pool and a courtyard in the north-east corner of the grounds.

=== Fraser, 1977–78 ===
Major work was carried out in 1977–78 to upgrade the kitchen and staff quarters and to extend the main dining room. The Frasers found the house drab and unwelcoming. The once-glamorous wallpaper was peeling from the guestroom ceiling, and numerous cracks had appeared in the bathroom walls. Tamie Fraser thought the layout of the house was inefficient, the service area inadequate and, like every occupant since 1927, found the dining room too small for adequate official entertaining. Among the visitors entertained at The Lodge by the Frasers were the Prince of Wales, and then Queen Elizabeth II and the Duke of Edinburgh in 1977.

The first task Tamie Fraser undertook was to supplement the surviving settings of the 1927 white and gold Royal Doulton dinner service. It had a special pattern that had been designed by Ruth Lane Poole in 1926 featuring the prime-ministerial monogram (consisting of the interwoven letters 'P' and 'M'), which also appears carved into the backs of the dining-room chairs. The man who handled Tamie Fraser's order in 1977 had arranged for the manufacture of the original set fifty years earlier. Though this expensive purchase created a furore, it did not deter Tamie Fraser from battling to secure major renovations of the service wing and dining room in 1978. She chose architect Guilford Bell to oversee this remodelling and to redecorate the main reception rooms to 'classic colours and style', with cream-painted walls and a white Berber carpet.

=== Hawke, 1987 ===
The most notable feature of the work done by Hawke's wife Hazel during her eight years at The Lodge was her sympathetic restoration of the building's interior. She also supported The Australiana Fund, started by Tamie Fraser, which used donations to collect Australian art and furniture for the four official residences – Government House and The Lodge in Canberra, and Admiralty House and Kirribilli House in Sydney. Hazel Hawke found and arranged restoration of The Lodge's original Australian-made Beale Piano. The piano, chosen for The Lodge by Ruth Lane Poole to fit the original designs for the drawing room, had been used in the Canberra School of Music as a practice piano after its removal from The Lodge. Mrs Hawke also fitted out a room on the mezzanine landing of The Lodge as her office, which she remembered as her favourite room in which she spent most of her time.

=== Keating, 1991 ===
The Keatings made some changes to the furnishings, moving a massive William Rojo bookcase provided by the Australiana Fund into storage and providing the 'Brown Room' with new sofas. Unlike many of the earlier prime-ministerial families, the Keatings preferred to treat The Lodge as a family home and did not often entertain official visitors there.

=== Howard, 1996 ===
Although the Howards chose to reside at Kirribilli House in Sydney, they used The Lodge for official purposes and made significant changes. From 2000 to 2005, the reception areas of the residence were progressively refurbished with the assistance of interior designer Mary Durack. The two main reception rooms, the Morning Room and the Drawing Room, were redecorated in a complementary theme rather than as two distinctive areas, as was previously the case. The dining room and the foyer were also refurbished.

=== Major refurbishment, 2011–2015 ===
Howard's successor in 2007, Kevin Rudd, returned to tradition by living at The Lodge, as did his successor Julia Gillard.

In October 2011 the Department of Finance and Deregulation had announced an intended 18-month repair and refurbishment project, involving roofing, insulation, guttering, plumbing, removal of hazardous material, heating and cooling, electrical rewiring, and replacement of the Australian Federal Police guard houses. "As these works have progressed, other works that could be undertaken to further improve the security, safety and functionality of the residence have been identified, and it is more efficient to complete these works while a major project is underway". In an interview with ABC News, Special Minister of State Gary Gray said the total cost would run into the millions of dollars. The original estimate of $3.19 million was rapidly exceeded and, as of 29 June 2015, had been revised to $8.8 million.

In 2013, after Kevin Rudd replaced Julia Gillard as PM, he led Labor to the 2013 federal election which resulted in Coalition leader Tony Abbott becoming prime minister. Pending the completion of the renovations, Abbott chose to reside at Kirribilli House in Sydney and the Australian Federal Police College when he was in the capital. The renovations were not completed before Abbott's term as prime minister ended, and thus he never had the opportunity to reside at The Lodge. Prime Minister Malcolm Turnbull and his wife Lucy moved into The Lodge in January 2016.

== Security ==
The Lodge is highly secure. The residence has many security features in protecting the prime minister and their family, including the use of many security cameras, biometric security scanners, high fences, shatterproof windows, and a safe room.

== Gallery ==
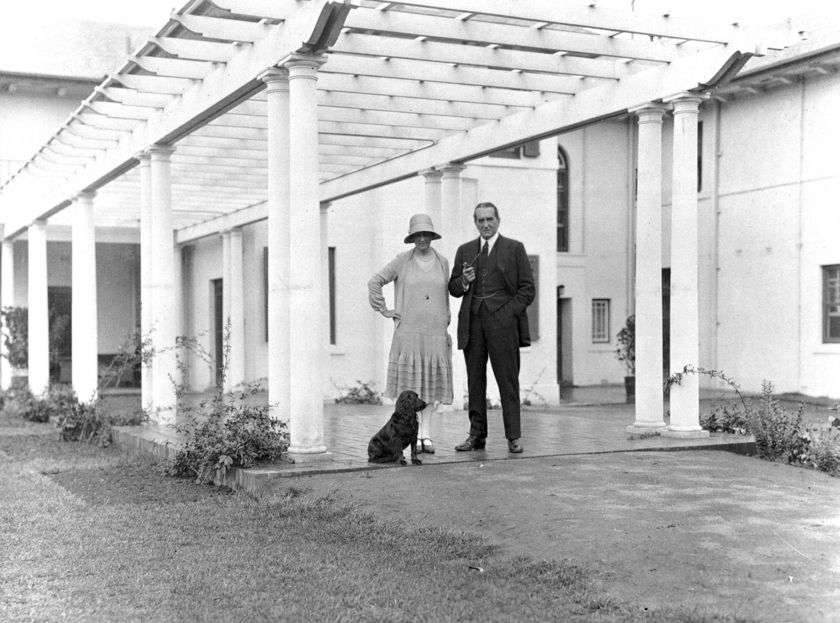
The Bruces at The Lodge in 1928.

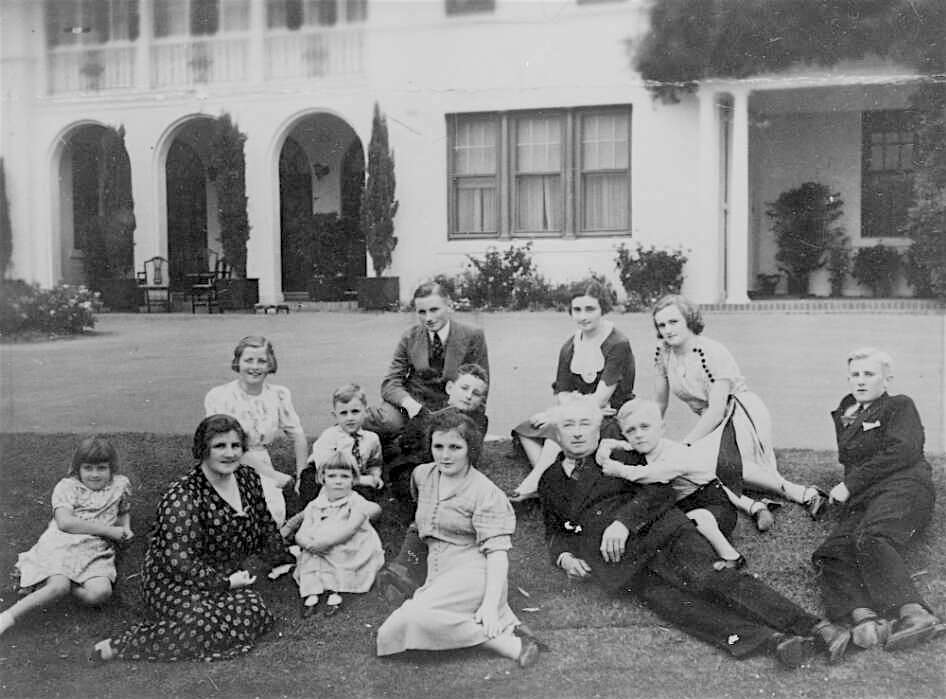
The Lyons family on the lawn in the 1930s

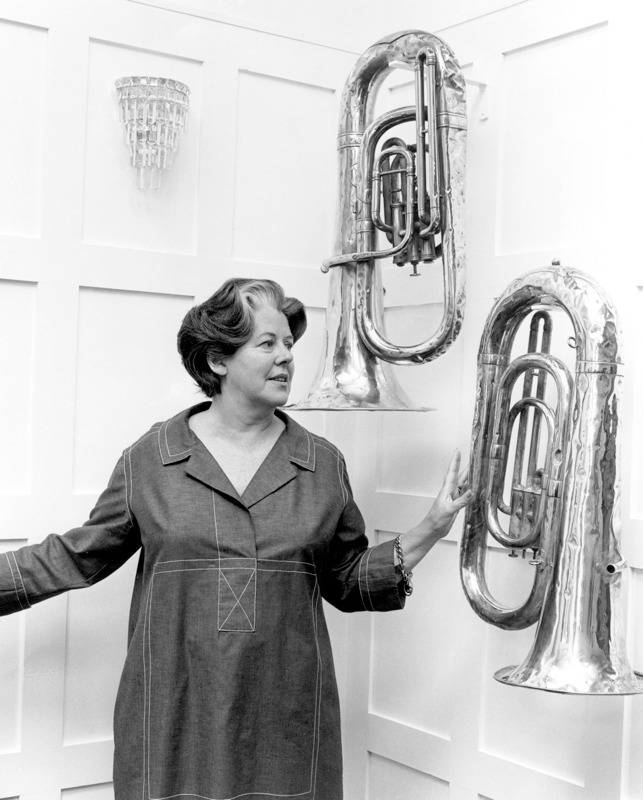
Dame Zara Bate, wife of Harold Holt, with the two euphoniums she hung at The Lodge, 1966

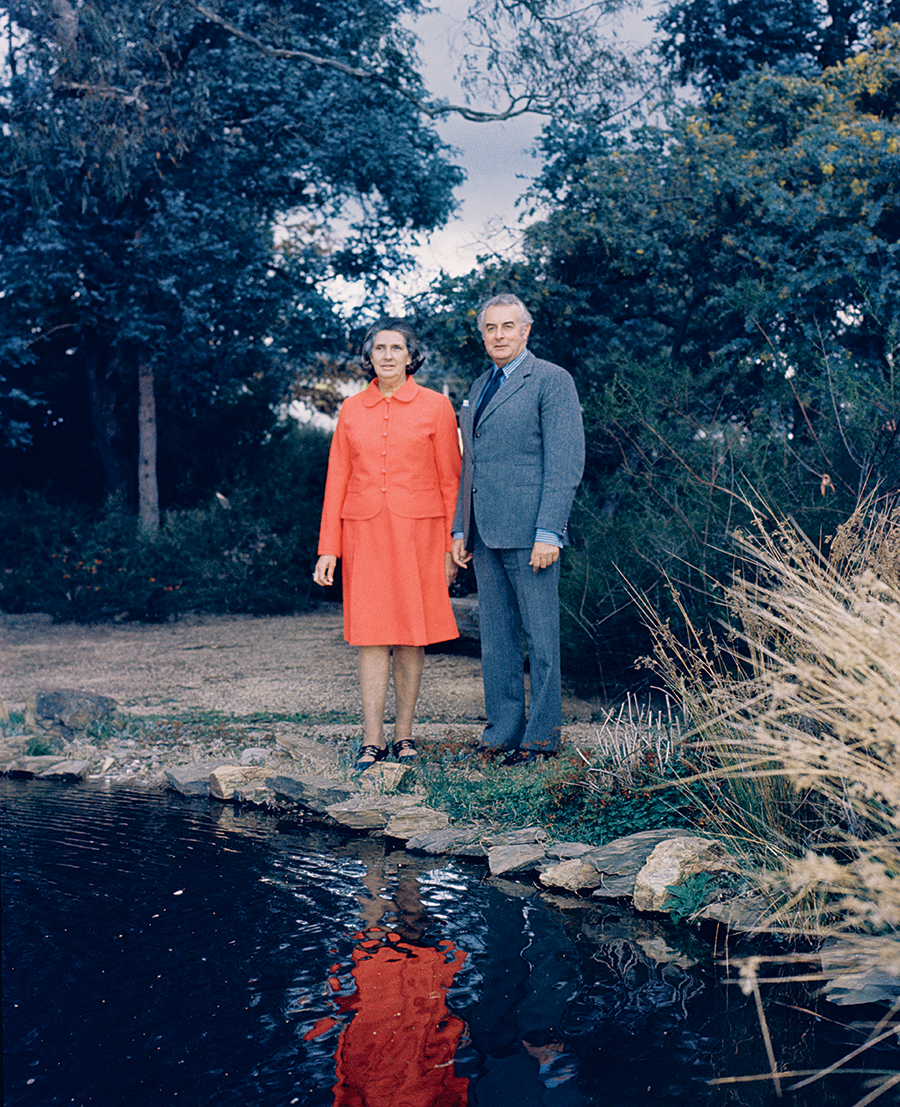
Margaret and Gough Whitlam in the gardens of The Lodge, 1973

Hazel Hawke at the original Australian-made Beale piano, which she found and restored during her time in The Lodge, c. 1980s

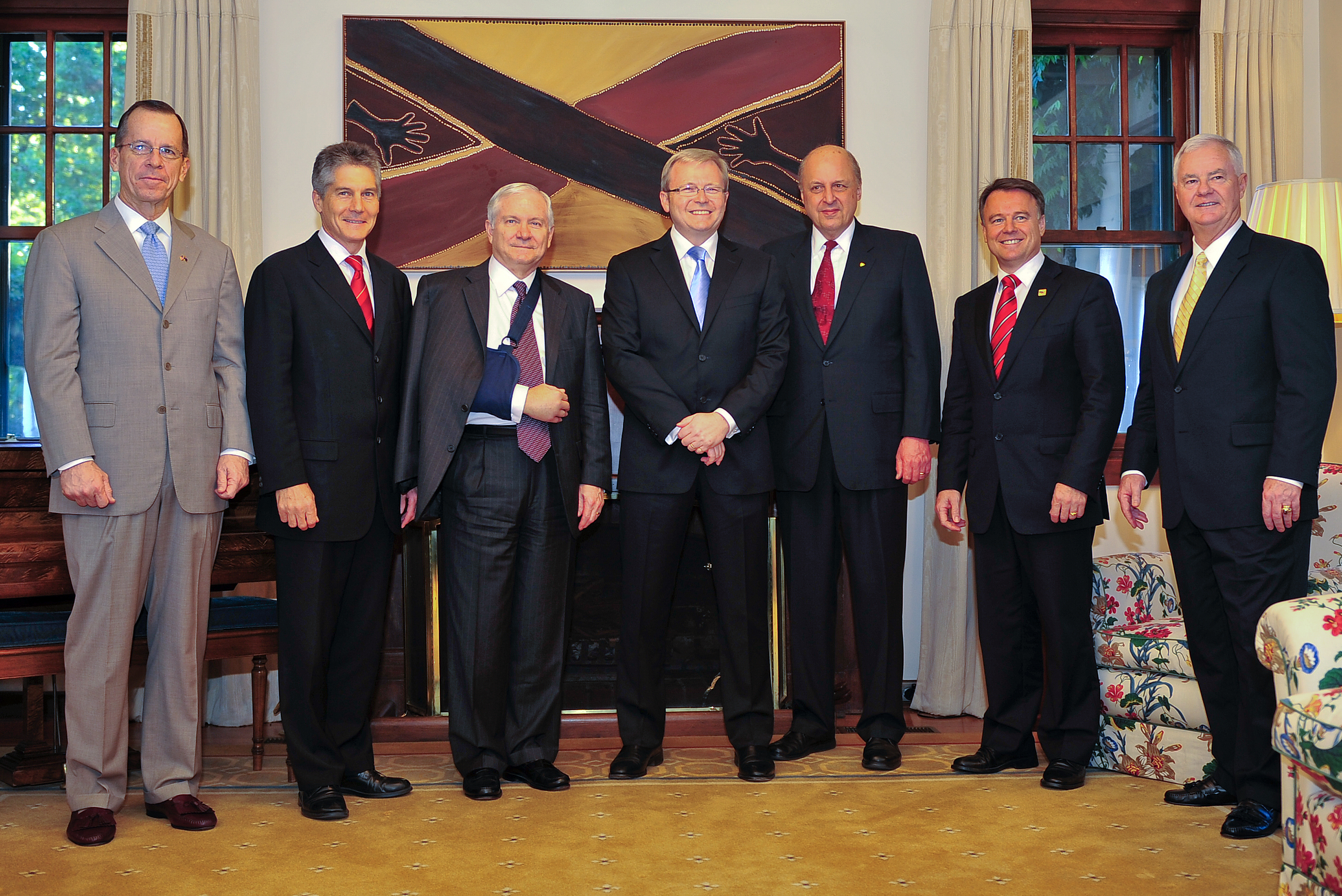
Kevin Rudd with Australian and U.S defence officials, 2008

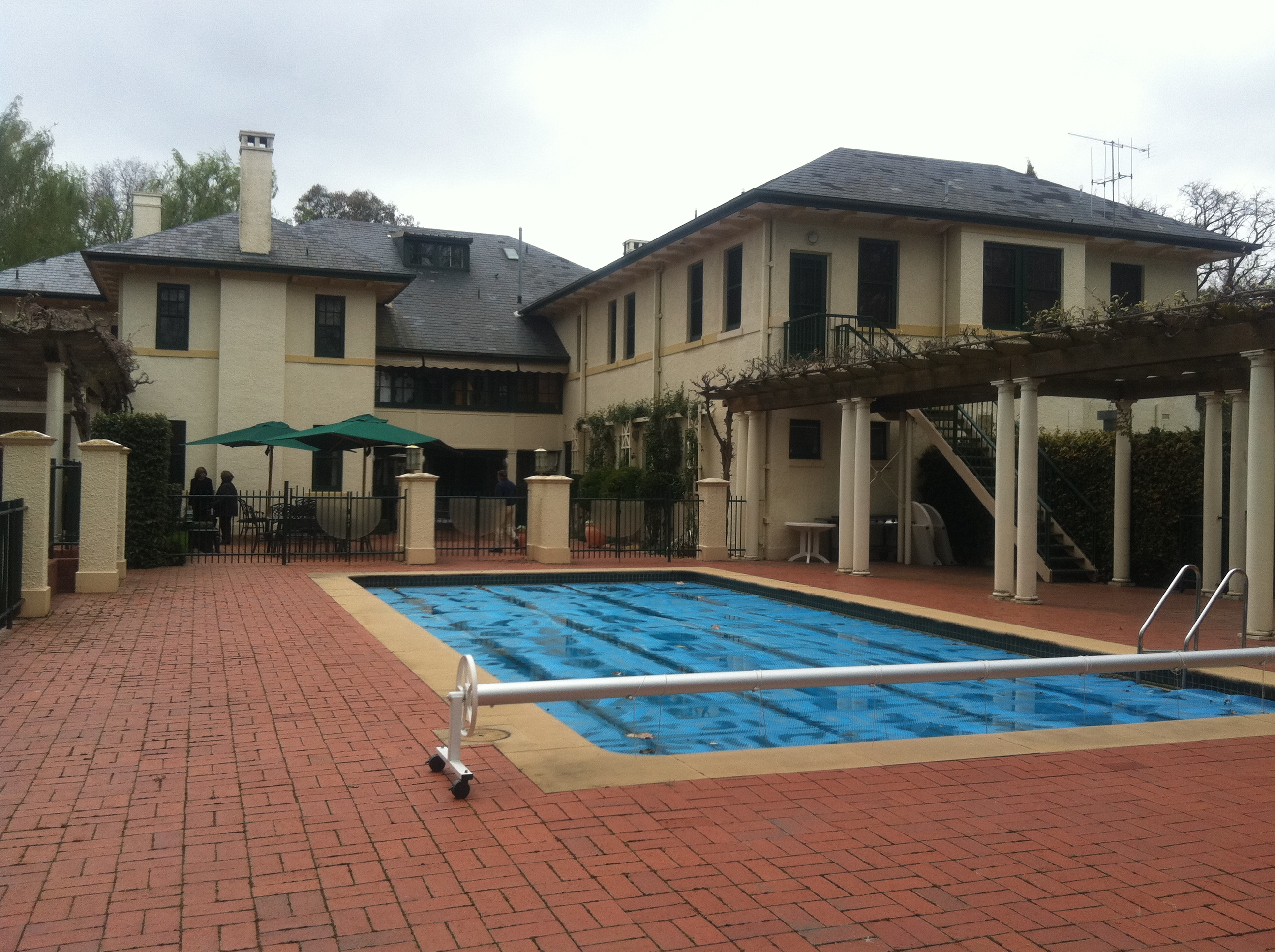
In 2011 before repairs to the roof. View from the back, showing the pool and BBQ area.

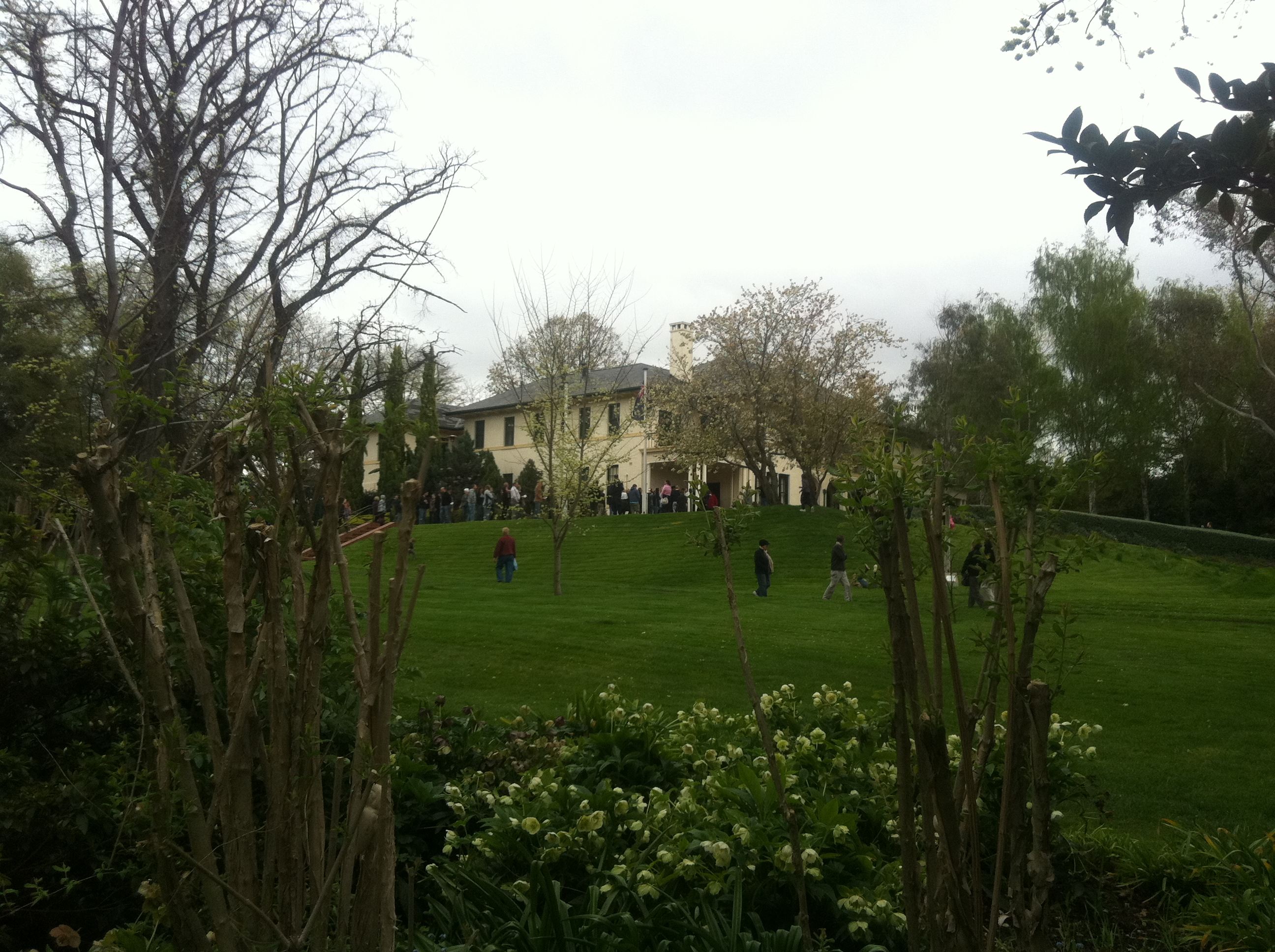
The Lodge in 2011. View from the gardens.

== See also ==
- Australian residential architectural styles
- List of official residences of Australia
