= The Australiana Fund =

The Australiana Fund is an independent fundraising organisation responsible for the purchase and maintenance of artworks in the four Official Residences of the Governor-General of Australia and the Prime Minister of Australia.

== History ==
The Australiana Fund was started in 1978 by Tamie Fraser, wife of the then Prime Minister, Malcolm Fraser.

Based on an idea for The Americana Fund by Jacqueline Kennedy for the Diplomatic Reception Rooms of the White House, Mrs. Fraser hoped to furnish the Official Residences of the Governor-General and Prime Minister of Australia with objects of Australian origin and craftsmanship. The Fund's collection policy also allows for the acquisition of items with specific relevance to past Governors-General and Prime Ministers.

== Activities ==
The Canberra Branch organises public tours of the gardens of Government House, "Yarralumla", every Thursday.

Acquisitions are made without financial assistance from the Australian Government so proceeds from these events allow a continuing programme of new acquisitions as well as the management of the existing collection. The current value of the collection is in excess of A$4 million.

The Australiana Fund's aim to enhance the decor of each house with quality artworks, furniture and objects which will represent the best of Australian workmanship from every State and Territory and in years to come will continue to reflect Australian cultural pride and heritage.

== Sites of the Official Residences ==
- Government House, Canberra ("Yarralumla")
- The Lodge, Canberra
- Admiralty House, Sydney
- Kirribilli House, Sydney
