= Tamie Fraser =

Spouse of Malcolm Fraser, 22nd Prime Minister of Australia

Tamie Fraser AO
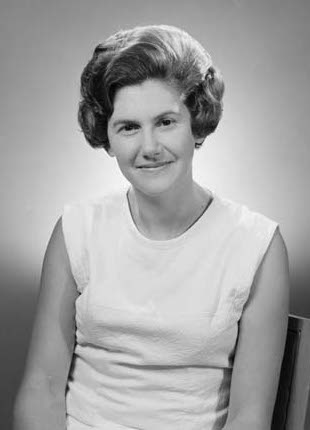
- Fraser in 1968

Spouse of the Prime Minister of Australia
- In role 11 November 1975 – 11 March 1983
- Preceded by: Margaret Whitlam
- Succeeded by: Hazel Hawke

Personal details
- Born: Tamara Margaret Beggs; 28 February 1936 (age 90) Adelaide, South Australia, Australia
- Spouse: Malcolm Fraser (m. 1956; died 2015)
- Children: 4

Tamara Margaret Fraser AO (née Beggs; born 28 February 1936) is the widow of Malcolm Fraser, who held office as Prime Minister of Australia between 1975 and 1983.

== Early life ==
Tamara Margaret Beggs was born in Adelaide, South Australia, the eldest of four children born to Helen Karen (née Seeck) and Sandford Robert Beggs. Her mother was a state champion in golf. Her father came from a family of pastoralists, and was a grandson of Francis Beggs, who was born in Malahide, Ireland, and arrived in the Port Phillip District in 1849. Her maternal grandfather, John Alexander Seeck, was a Baltic German born in what is now Latvia. He arrived in Australia in 1883 and became a pioneer of the local wine industry.

Beggs grew up on Nareeb Nareeb, her father's property near Glenthompson, Victoria. She began her education with governesses, and then at the age of nine was sent to board at The Hermitage, a girls' school in Geelong that was later merged into Geelong Grammar School. She was a school prefect and sport captain.

== Marriage and children ==
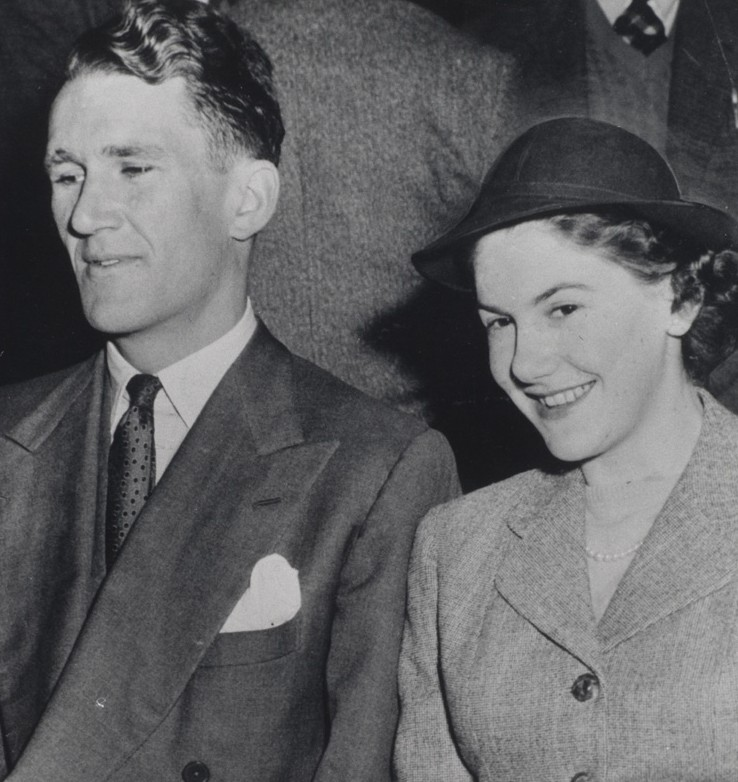
Tamie and Malcolm Fraser attending a political event in 1958

Fraser met her future husband at a New Year's Eve party in 1955; she was almost six years younger than he. They announced their engagement in May 1956 and married in Willaura on 9 December. The couple had four children together: Mark (b. 1958), Angela (b. 1959), Hugh (b. 1962), and Phoebe (b. 1966).

== Public life ==
Fraser disliked public speaking and electioneering work, but when her husband fell ill during the crucial election campaign of December 1975, after the dismissal of the Whitlam government, she represented him and spoke on his behalf.

Fraser founded and was president of The Australiana Fund from 1978 to 1983. She was President of Australia's Open Garden Scheme. In 2004, she was appointed an Officer of the Order of Australia for her service to the community through fostering the recognition and preservation of Australian artistic achievement, for initiating and promoting a range of activities to support people with disabilities, and for support of charitable, health and service groups.

== Interviews ==
Fraser was interviewed by Heather Rusden in 1991. The recording can be found at the National Library of Australia.

== See also ==
- Spouse of the Prime Minister of Australia

Honorary titles
Preceded by Margaret Whitlam	Spouse of the Prime Minister of Australia; 11 November 1975 – 5 March 1983	Succeeded by Hazel Hawke
