= Admiralty House, Sydney =

Official residence of the Governor-General of Australia in Kirribilli, Sydney

Admiralty House
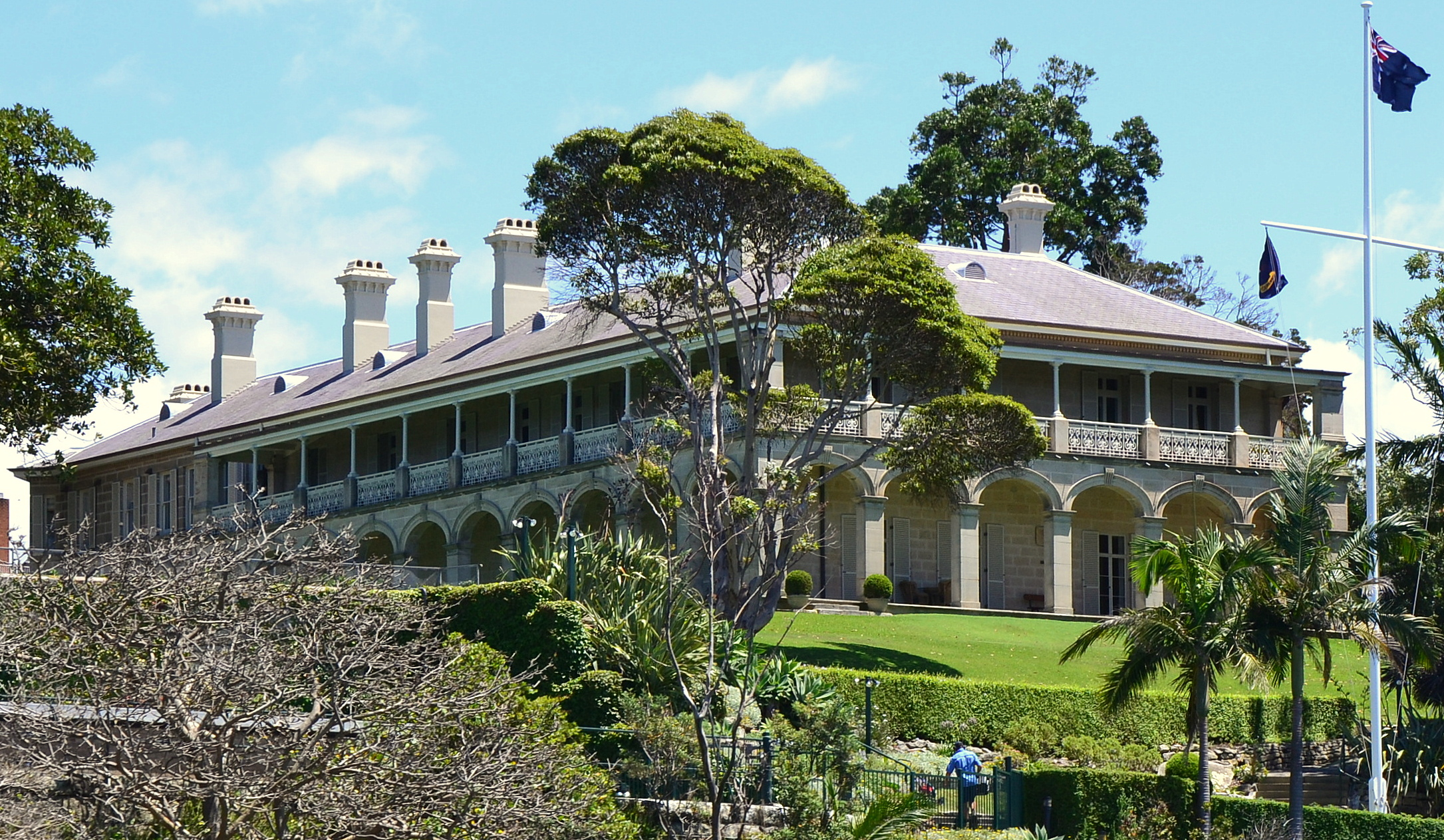
- Admiralty House viewed from the south

- Location within east Sydney
- Former names: Wotonga

General information
- Status: Completed
- Type: Viceregal residence of the Governor-General
- Architectural style: Victorian Regency; Victorian Italianate
- Location: 109 Kirribilli Avenue, Kirribilli, Sydney, New South Wales, Australia
- Coordinates: 33°51′06″S 151°13′06″E
- Construction started: 1842
- Completed: 1843
- Client: John George Nathaniel Gibbes
- Owner: King Charles III in right of the Commonwealth Government

Technical details
- Material: Sydney sandstone

Design and construction
- Architects: James Barnet; Walter Liberty Vernon
- Architecture firm: Colonial Architect

Commonwealth Heritage List
- Official name: Admiralty House Garden and Fortifications
- Type: Built
- Designated: 22 June 2004
- Reference no.: 105399

Admiralty House is the official residence of the governor-general of Australia in Sydney. It is located in the suburb of Kirribilli, on the northern foreshore of Sydney Harbour, and adjacent to Kirribilli House, which serves as the Sydney residence of the Australian Prime Minister. The large Victorian Regency and Italianate sandstone manor, completed in stages based on designs by James Barnet and Walter Liberty Vernon, occupies the tip of Kirribilli Point. Once known as "Wotonga", it has commanding views across Sydney Harbour to the Sydney Harbour Bridge and the Sydney Opera House. Admiralty House is regarded as the secondary residence of the governor-general, the main residence being Government House in Canberra, also known as Yarralumla.

Its current name originates in the fact that it served as the residence for the Commander-in-Chief of the Royal Navy's Australian Squadron from 1885 to 1913.

The original building on the site was completed, as a private dwelling, in mid-to-late 1843, by John George Nathaniel Gibbes, the then Collector of Customs for New South Wales and a member of the New South Wales Legislative Council. A portrait of Gibbes, painted in 1808, hangs in the house.

On 22 June 2004 Admiralty House was placed on the Commonwealth Heritage List.

== History ==
=== Early history ===
Before the arrival of British settlers in Sydney Harbour, the Aboriginal Cammeraygal people lived along the Kirribilli and Milsons Point foreshores, and in the surrounding bushland. The area was a fertile fishing ground, and the name Kirribilli is derived from the Aboriginal word kiarabilli, which means "good fishing spot". The name Cammeraygal is displayed on the North Sydney Municipal Council emblem, and also gave name to the suburb of Cammeray.

Kirribilli was settled early in the history of the Colony. One of the first records of land being granted on the North Shore was 12 hectares (30 acres) on the North side of the Harbour of Port Jackson opposite Sydney Cove on 20 February 1794 to an expired convict, Samuel Lightfoot. Lightfoot was a former convict, born in about 1763 and transported to Australia for seven years for stealing clothing. He arrived with the First Fleet in 1788 on the Charlotte.

In 1794 Thomas Muir, a Scottish constitutional reformer, was sentenced to transportation for sedition. Thomas Muir purchased Lightfoot's farm. Muir also had a cottage on what is now Circular Quay. It is likely that the farm was located at the Jeffrey Street end of Kirribilli (not near Admiralty House) and was named "Huntershill" by Thomas Muir, after his father's home in Scotland. Thomas Muir escaped from the colony in 1796 aboard an American brig, the Otter.

Four years later the Colonial Secretary recorded that the land grant to Lightfoot was cancelled and given to Robert Ryan in 1800 with no mention of the intermediate (private) sale to Muir. Ryan had worked in Norfolk Island, both as a soldier and also a settler. The 12 hectares (30 acres) of Lightfoot's Grant was cancelled and included in a 49-hectare (120-acre) grant to Ryan for his service in the Royal Marines and the New South Wales Corps. The corresponding entry in the Register of Land Grants states Cancelled, and a New Grant given to Robert Ryan for 90 acres in addition to this Allotment, by Governor John Hunter. See the third Register, Folio 37. This grant to Ryan included almost all Kirribilli and later maps referred. By 1801, the property had passed into the hands of Robert Campbell, a wealthy Sydney merchant. Campbell built Australia's first shipbuilding yards in 1807, at the site that is now occupied by the Royal Sydney Yacht Squadron, Kirribilli. Part of the land in Kirribilli was also briefly used for quarantine purposes in 1814 for the convict ship Surry. Over 46 persons had died during the voyage of typhoid including 36 convicts.

Campbell's property in Kirribilli was used for grazing under lease to Campbell's friend James Milson, hence the name "Milson's Point". Milson's Point is the next point along from Kirribilli point, where the Sydney Harbour Bridge now crosses the harbour. A plan of sub-division was drawn up in the 1840s by Campbell. In 1842, the 2.0-hectare (5-acre) site where Admiralty House now sits was leased to the Collector of Customs for the Colony, Lieutenant-Colonel (later full Colonel) Gibbes, MLC. Gibbes intended to build a private home on the site. (Since his arrival in the colony in 1834, Gibbes and his family had been living in Henrietta Villa, also known as the Naval Villa, on Sydney's Point Piper, under a leasehold arrangement.)

=== Private residence ===
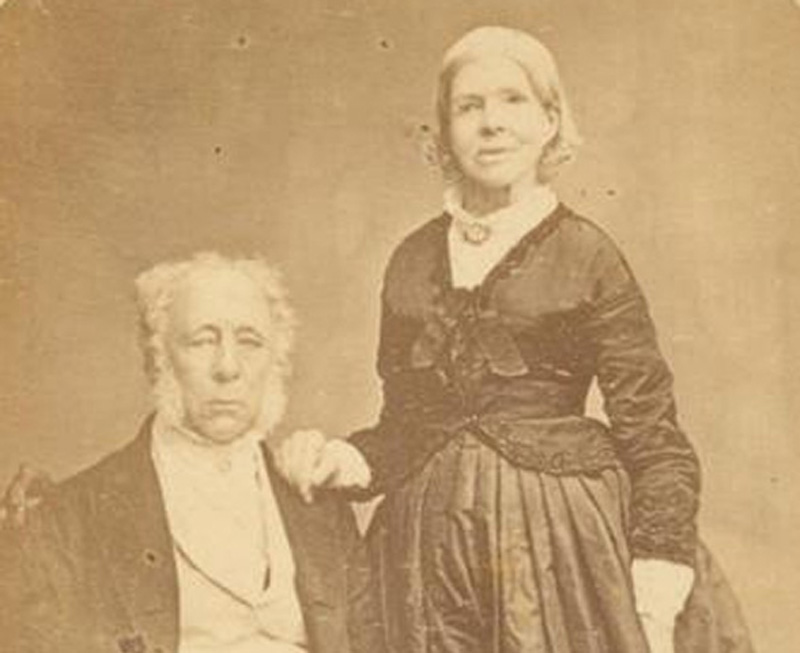
Colonel John George Nathaniel Gibbes and Elizabeth Gibbes, 1865. The building that would become Admiralty House was initially erected by the Gibbes family.

On the superb Kirribilli Point location, Gibbes erected, between 1842 and 1843, a graceful single-storey house with wide verandahs and elegant French doors. Gibbes designed the house, which he called "Wotonga" (or "Woottonga"), himself. The stone for the house's walls was quarried locally and the hardwood and cedar joinery came from George Coleson's timber-yard in George Street, Sydney. Gibbes engaged James Hume, a well-known builder who dabbled in ecclesiastical architecture, to supervise the construction of the building and its stables. Gibbes, however, hired his own masons, bricklayers, carpenters, plumbers and ironmongers to work on the project, paying each of them separately as work progressed. Gibbes used the Custom Department's cutter to commute to and from the building site. Once completed, Gibbes' L-shaped residence featured a plain, yet stylish, double façade to maximise the building's magnificent, sweeping views across Sydney Harbour. These views enabled Gibbes to monitor shipping traffic in and out of Darling Harbour and, more importantly, Circular Quay, where the Sydney Customs House was situated.

Today, Wotonga forms the core of Admiralty House and the building's 180-degree, east–west panoramic sight-lines are even more spectacular than they were in Gibbes' day, owing to the subsequent high-rise growth of Sydney's CBD.

Gibbes, incidentally, was said to be the illegitimate child of Frederick, Duke of York, (King George III's second son). This reputed connection to the British monarchy adds spice to the house on Kirribilli Point's subsequent role as a vice-regal establishment.

In 1849, Robert Campbell died and the executors of the estate sold the property, comprising the house and 2.0 hectares (5 acres) land, to Gibbes for about A£1,400. On 27 December 1851, Gibbes, who was contemplating a departure from the Customs Service at the age of 64, sold the property to James Lindsay Travers, a merchant of Macquarie Place, Sydney, for £1,533. (Gibbes subsequently changed his mind about leaving his position as head of the NSW Customs Department; instead, he leased Greycliffe House at Shark Beach, Vaucluse, from the Wentworth family and remained in Sydney for the better part of eight years, eventually retiring to Yarralumla homestead, now the official Canberra residence of the Governor-General of Australia, in 1859.)

A small portion of the Kirribilli Point land, a little over 0.40-hectare (1-acre) was sold by Travers in 1854 to a merchant, Adolph Frederic Feez. On this land, Kirribilli House was built in neo-Gothic style. Kirribilli House, situated next door to Admiralty House, serves today as the official Sydney residence of the Prime Minister of Australia.

==== Crimean War interlude ====
In 1855, during the Crimean War, Governor William Denison reclaimed the tip of Kirribilli Point, on which fortifications were built. These fortifications, along with Fort Denison, were intended to strengthen the defences of Sydney Harbour, as it was feared that the Russians might attack. In 1856, Lieutenant-Colonel George Barney, a Royal Engineers officer, lived in "Wotonga" and designed and supervised the installation of a battery of five, 8-inch (20 cm) muzzle-loading guns on Kirribilli Point, as well as constructing the martello tower at Fort Denison.

==== Lassetter, Wilshire, and Cadell ====
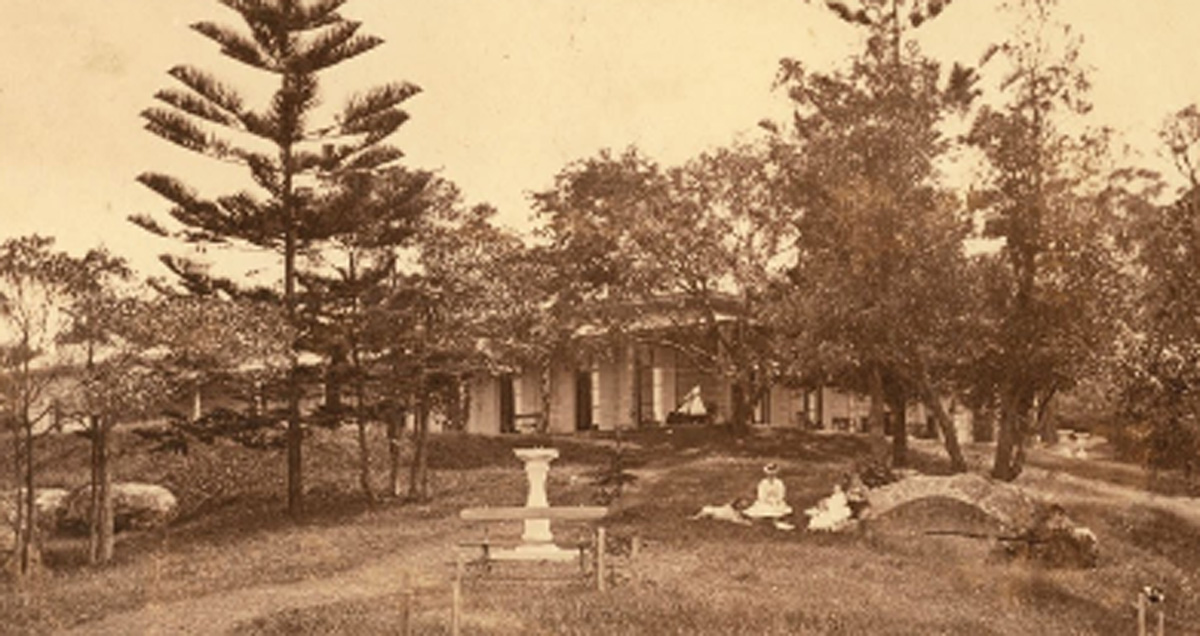
The residence, when it was known as Wotonga, and owned by Thomas Cadell, c. 1880

In 1856, Lieutenant-Colonel Barney bought the house and its grounds so that he could view all of the sites that he had fortified. In September 1860, Barney sold the house and grounds for £9,000 to George Alfred Lloyd. In 1866, it was let to Frederick Lassetter and subsequently to James Robert Wilshire, a former Lord Mayor of Sydney and a Member of the New South Wales Legislative Council from 1858 to 1861.

In April 1874, Wotonga House was auctioned and bought for £10,100 by Thomas Cadell, a Sydney merchant and member of the New South Wales Legislative Council from 1881 to 1896. At that time, the house was described as possessing a wide verandah, a spacious entrance hall, drawing and dining rooms, 10 bedrooms and the "usual rooms" in the main part of the house, as well as having a large courtyard, servants' rooms, kitchen, stables, etc., with an abundant water supply, which never failed in the driest weather.

=== Admiralty ===
In 1885, the Royal Navy's Australian Squadron was raised to the status of an admiral's command in recognition of the colony's growing importance and the colonial government bought "Wotonga" as his residence. The house was renamed "Admiralty House" and additions were made to the property. A second storey was added to the house, as was a colonnaded verandah. A neo-Gothic style gate lodge was also added to the grounds, as was a covered Admiral's Walk leading down to the berth for the Admiral's barge below.

In 1913, this part of the history of Admiralty House came to a close when the last British admiral left the house and the Royal Australian Navy took over responsibility for the naval defence of Australia.

From the Federation of Australia in 1901, the Government House of New South Wales in Farm Cove was used as the Sydney residence of the Governor-General. In 1912, the Government of New South Wales decided to put the building to public purposes once more, leaving the Governor-General of the period, Lord Denman, without a Sydney residence.

=== Government House ===
With the departure of the last British admiral from Admiralty House in 1913, the Admiralty handed the house back to the New South Wales Government. This provided Lord Denman's successor, Sir Ronald Munro Ferguson, with a Sydney residence. Admiralty House was the residence of the Governors-General for the following fifteen years.

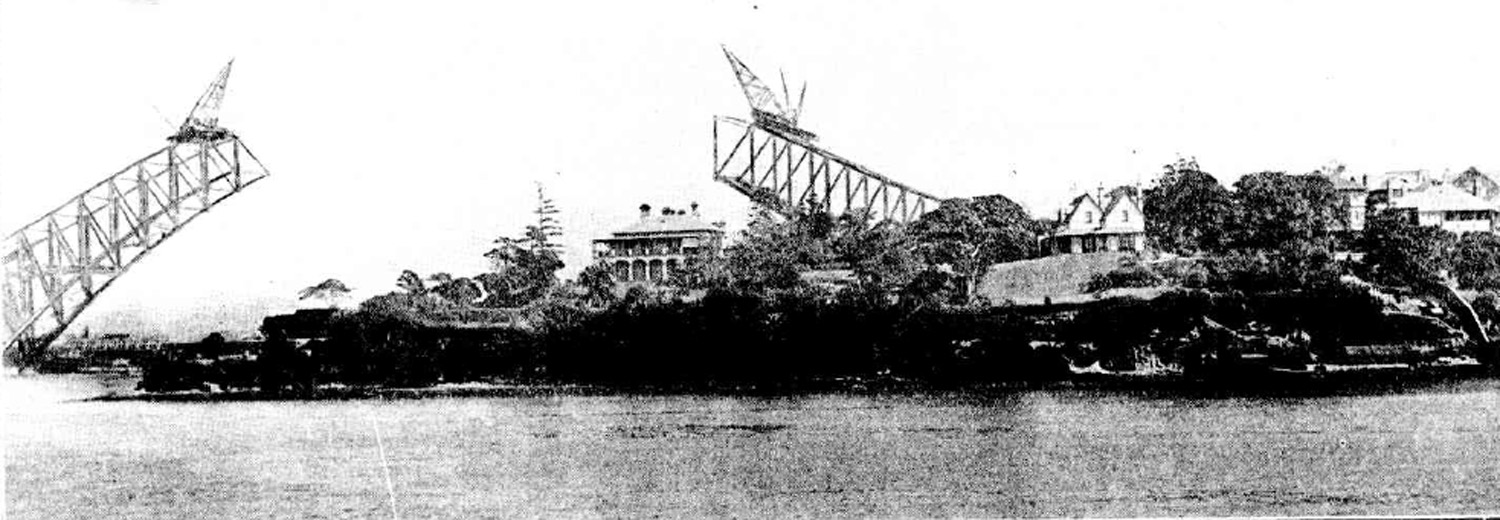
Admiralty House in 1930. The building was closed that year, and was not reopened until 1936.

In 1930, during the Great Depression, the Scullin ministry had Admiralty House closed, and its contents were sold at Auction in 1931. Governor-General Sir Isaac Isaacs, appointed in 1931, was the first Governor-General to live permanently at Yarralumla, in Canberra. During his term, Admiralty House remained empty and neglected. Sir Isaac described it in 1934 as being "stripped of its glamour, with no furnishings but a few fine mirrors, its garden wild and overgrown". In 1936, the State of New South Wales reopened Admiralty House as the Sydney residence for the new Governor-General, Lord Gowrie. The house has been used ever since as a vice-regal establishment.

Formal title to Admiralty House finally passed from the State Government to the Commonwealth by Crown grant in 1948, on the condition that the house was to be used only as a residence for the Governor-General.

== Functions ==
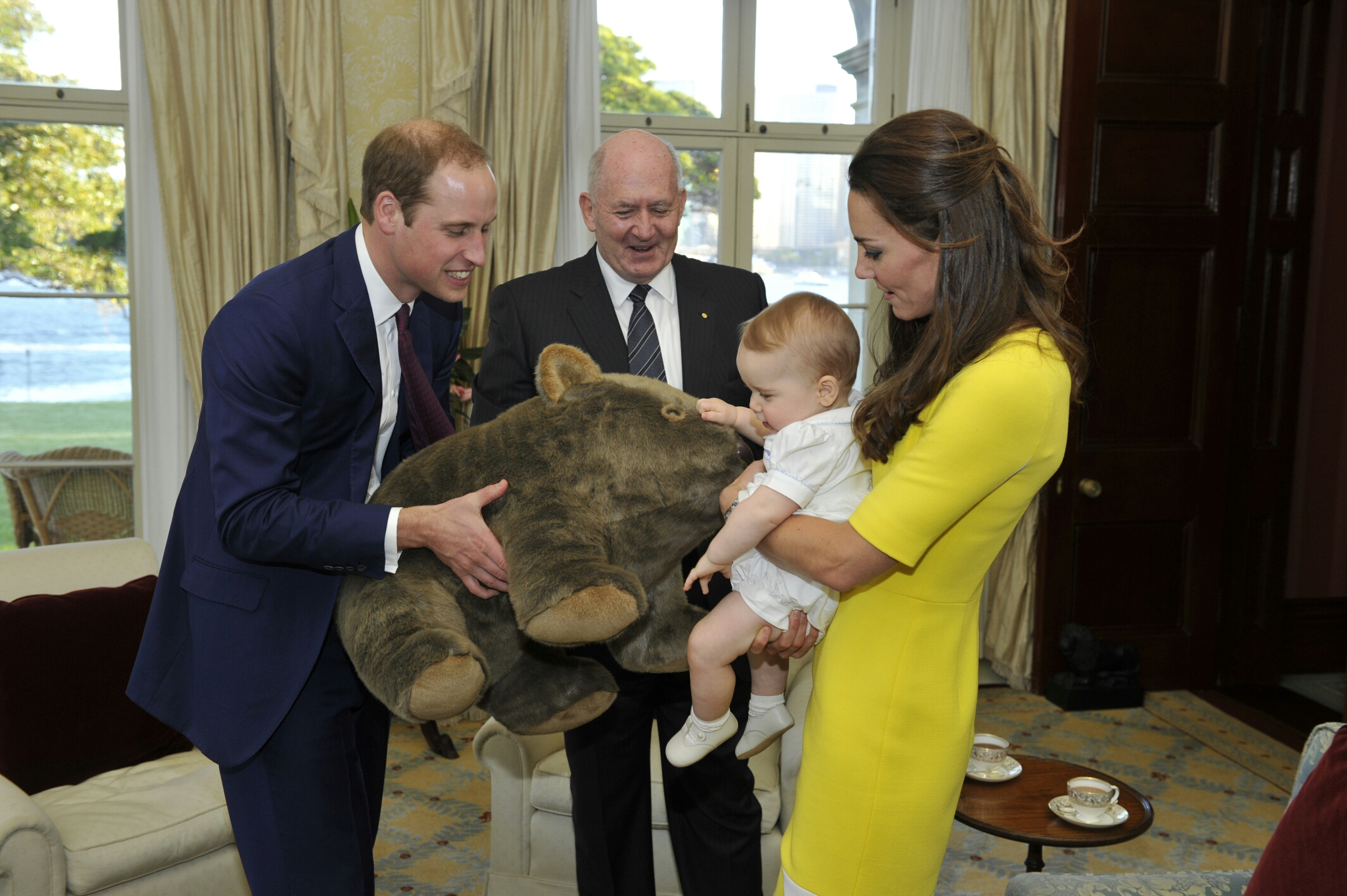
The Duke and Duchess of Cambridge and Prince George of Wales with Governor-General Peter Cosgrove at Admiralty House, 2014

Admiralty House is an official residence of the Governor-General of Australia, and accommodates the King of Australia and Royal Family when they are in Sydney. Other dignitaries, such as the President of the United States and the Pope, have also been entertained at Admiralty House when they are in Sydney.

Admiralty House, its grounds, and Kirribilli House are usually open to the public once a year, sometime in spring when the gardens are at their best. Security concerns caused the cancellation of openings from 2001 to 2005.

== Architecture ==
=== Interior ===
The ground floor of the house contains a vestibule and hallway, two reception rooms, a dining-room, a study and an elaborate central staircase. The residents' private rooms are on the upper floors. A landing on the staircase features elaborate stained glass panels in its windows. Kitchens and other service areas are housed in a wing added to the original structure. A stone gatehouse guards the front entrance to the establishment.

The house is furnished extensively with colonial furniture, porcelain, ornaments and numerous historical artworks such as portraits of Captain James Cook and some former Governors-General, including Hallam Tennyson, 2nd Baron Tennyson. Many of these items were acquired for the nation by The Australiana Fund.

== See also ==
- Government Houses of Australia
- Government Houses of the British Empire
- Governor-General of Australia
