= Kirribilli House =

Secondary official residence of the Prime Minister of Australia

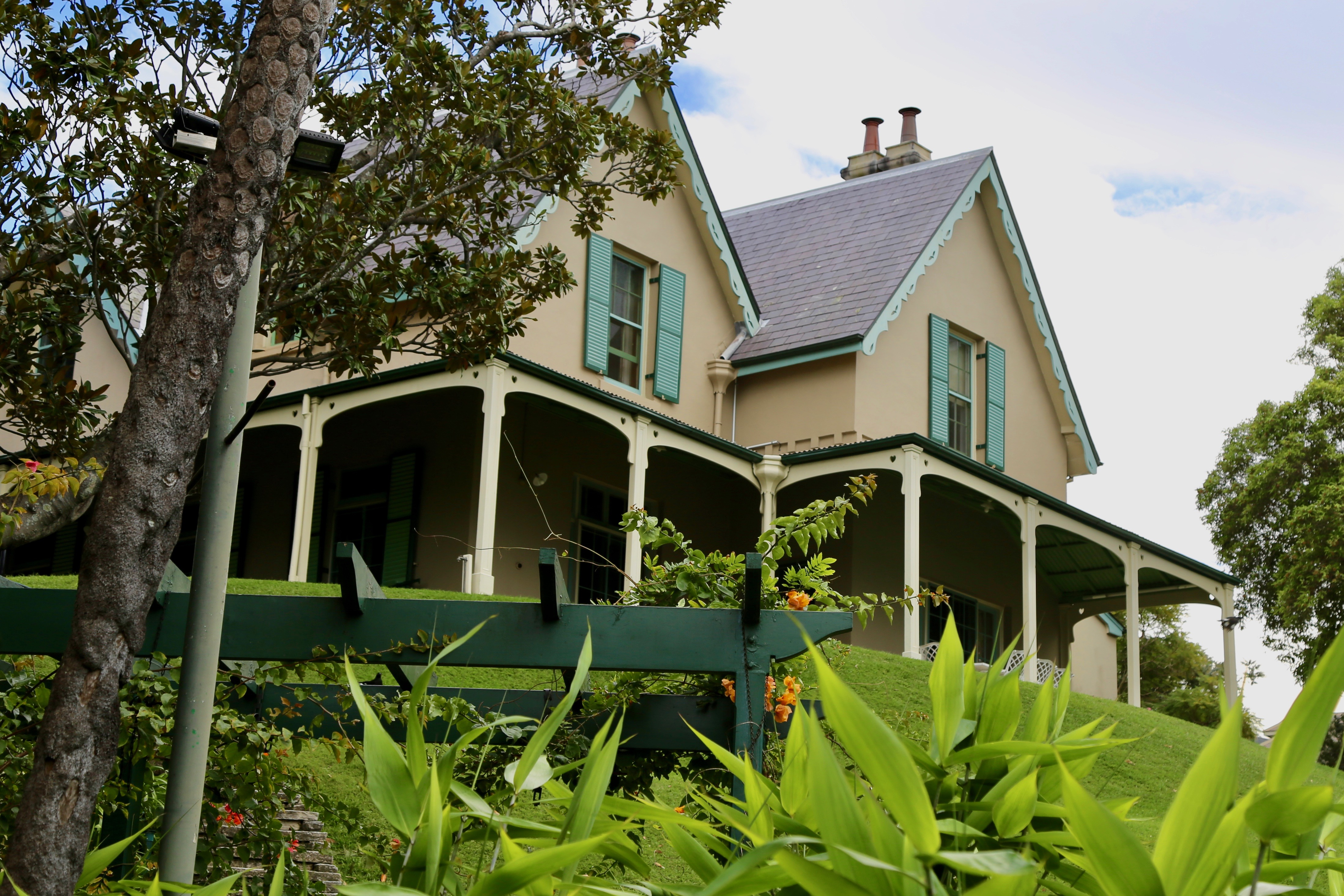
- Kirribilli House, pictured in 2019
- Interactive map of the Kirribilli House area

General information
- Architectural style: Cottage ornée
- Location: 109 Kirribilli Avenue, Kirribilli, New South Wales, Australia
- Coordinates: 33°51′05″S 151°13′09″E
- Current tenants: Not occupied
- Completed: 1855

Design and construction
- Architect: Adolphus Frederic Feez

Commonwealth Heritage List
- Official name: Kirribilli House; Kirribilli House Garden & Grounds
- Type: Historic
- Criteria: a., b., d., e., g., h.
- Designated: 22 June 2004
- Reference no.: 105451 & 105589

Kirribilli House is the secondary official residence of the prime minister of Australia. Located in the suburb of Kirribilli on Sydney's Lower North Shore, the cottage and its associated grounds are located at the far eastern end of Kirribilli Avenue. It is one of two official prime ministerial residences, the primary official residence being The Lodge in Canberra. The house, gardens and grounds are on the Commonwealth Heritage List.

Although Kirribilli was never intended to be the Prime Minister's official primary place of residence, John Howard, Tony Abbott and Scott Morrison, all of whom were MPs for Sydney seats, have used the house as such.

== Overview ==
In 1854, merchant Adolphus Frederic Feez purchased a 0.40-hectare (1-acre) parcel of land at the tip of Kirribilli Point for £200. The land had been sliced off the grounds of adjacent Wotonga House, which now forms part of Admiralty House, but was then in private ownership. Feez built the picturesque Gothic-style structure now known as Kirribilli House – a twin-gabled dwelling or cottage ornée – on the land's highest spot. The house features steeply pitched roofs, fretwork, bargeboards and bay windows. It passed through many private hands until it was purchased in 1919 for £10,000 by Arthur Wigram Allen. Allen planned to subdivide the land but after much public agitation the then Prime Minister of Australia, Billy Hughes, resumed the property for Government purposes in 1920.

The property was used by the staff of the Governor-General of Australia (who occupied neighbouring Admiralty House) until 1930, when it was leased to tenants. In 1956 Kirribilli House was set aside as a residence for the use of Australia's Prime Ministers, when they need to perform public duties and extend official hospitality on behalf of the government during stays in Sydney; the official Prime Ministerial residence is The Lodge in Canberra. Kirribilli House is situated on the North Shore of Sydney Harbour, in the suburb of Kirribilli. It commands impressive views across to the Sydney Harbour Bridge, Circular Quay and the Sydney Opera House and has been visited over the years by many important international dignitaries.

Kirribilli House is open to the public on one day a year, courtesy of The Australiana Fund.

== History ==
=== Adolphus Frederic Feez ===
Adolphus Frederic Feez, who built Kirribilli House in 1855, was born in Germany in 1826. He went first to London in 1849 and is listed on the Certificate of Arrival as being a merchant and an architect. In 1851 he immigrated to Sydney on the ship Envelope. He established himself as a successful merchant and was a partner in the trading company called Rabone, Feez and Co. His brother was Albrecht Feez, who later became a prominent citizen in Rockhampton.

Feez lived in Kirribilli House for several years which was then called Sophienberg. He then moved to Balmain. He married Frederica and had two children while living in Sydney. While on a business trip to Fiji he died in 1869 at the age of only 43. Frederica returned with her children to live in Germany.

=== The Lawry family ===
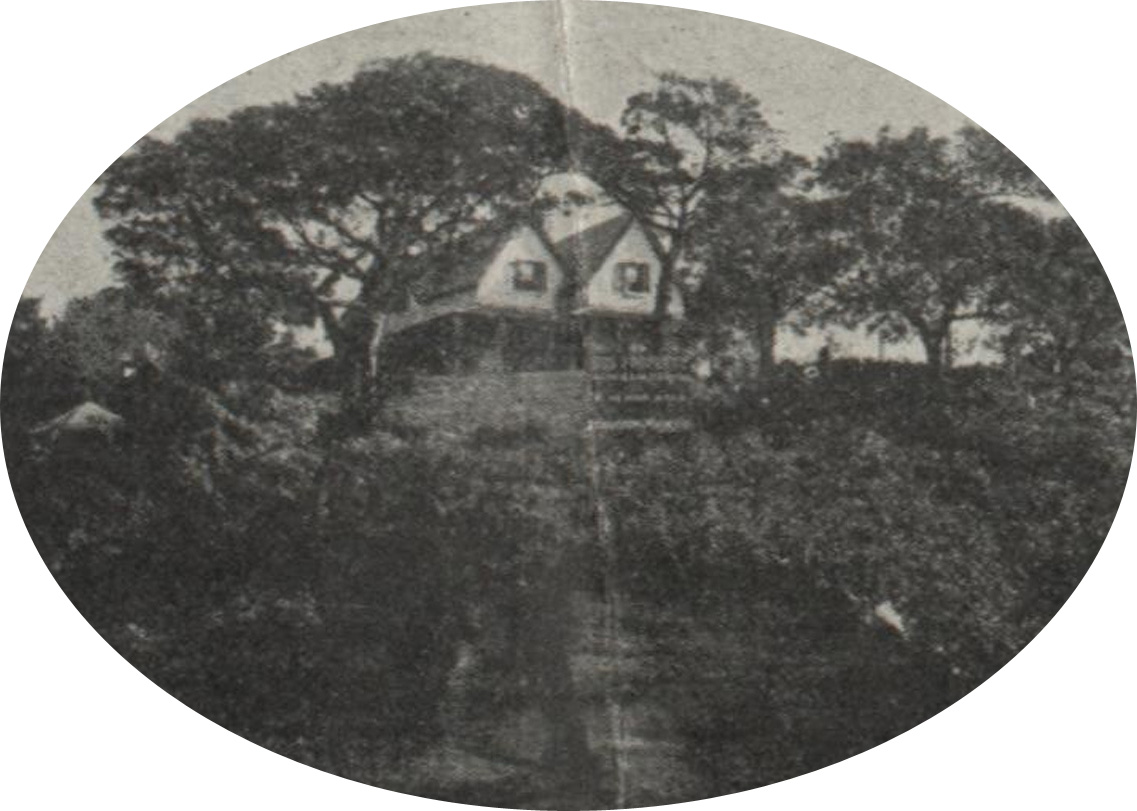
Kirribilli House in 1920 just before it was resumed by the Australian Government

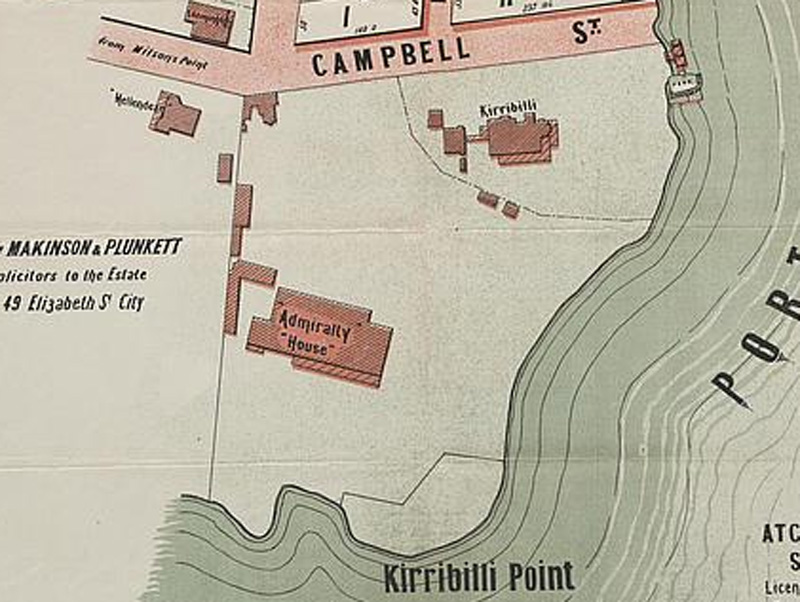
Map of Kirribilli Point, 1909

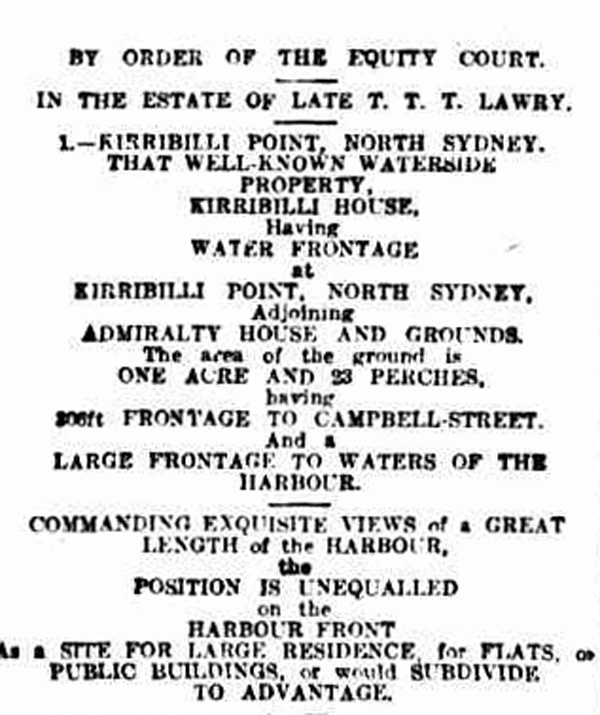
Advertisement for sale of Kirribilli House, 1919

The next residents of Kirribilli House from about 1858 were Thomas and Esther Lawry. Thomas Lawry was born in 1821. He was employed by the Ordnance Department in Sydney at a young age, and remained there for the rest of his life. He was also appointed as a magistrate by the Governor. He married Esther Hughes in 1858 and the couple had two children. In 1859, the birth of a daughter at Sophienberg was recorded in the newspaper so it appears that the house continued to be called by this name after the Lawrys purchased it.

Esther Lawry’s maiden name was Esther Matilda Hosking Hughes and she was the step granddaughter of Samuel Terry, the very wealthy convict entrepreneur. In 1858, Esther inherited a considerable amount of money from her grandmother Rosetta Terry.

In 1865, Thomas Lawry died at the age of 44. The death notice records that the name of the house was still Sophienberg. Two years later in 1867, Esther married James Taylor, who was the Commissary-General of Ordnance. This couple then lived in the house with Esther’s two children, one of whom was Thomas Terry Trewyn Lawry. In 1891, James Taylor died. By this time the house had been named "Kirribilli" and was located in Campbell Street as the map on the left shows. In 1900, Esther died, and the house was left to her son Thomas Terry Trewyn Lawry.

Thomas Terry Trewyn Lawry was born in 1864. He seemed to have rather poor health and did not marry. In 1907, at the age of only 42 he died of heart failure. As he had no children he left his property to relatives and others. He made a very complex will leaving Kirribilli house to several people one of whom was Laura Lamotte. Laura married William Donald McCrea in 1909. Laura and William lived in the house for some time but she then wanted to sell the property. There was some disagreement about the sale with the other beneficiaries and the matter was taken to the Equity Court. The Court resolved that the property should be sold and it was put on the market in 1919. The House was bought by Arthur Wigram Allen who planned to subdivide the land. In 1920, he produced a brochure with a photo of the house and the planned subdivision.

There was public outcry about the sale of the house and the Government under the then Prime Minister Billy Hughes decided to resume it. The property has remained in Government ownership since then.

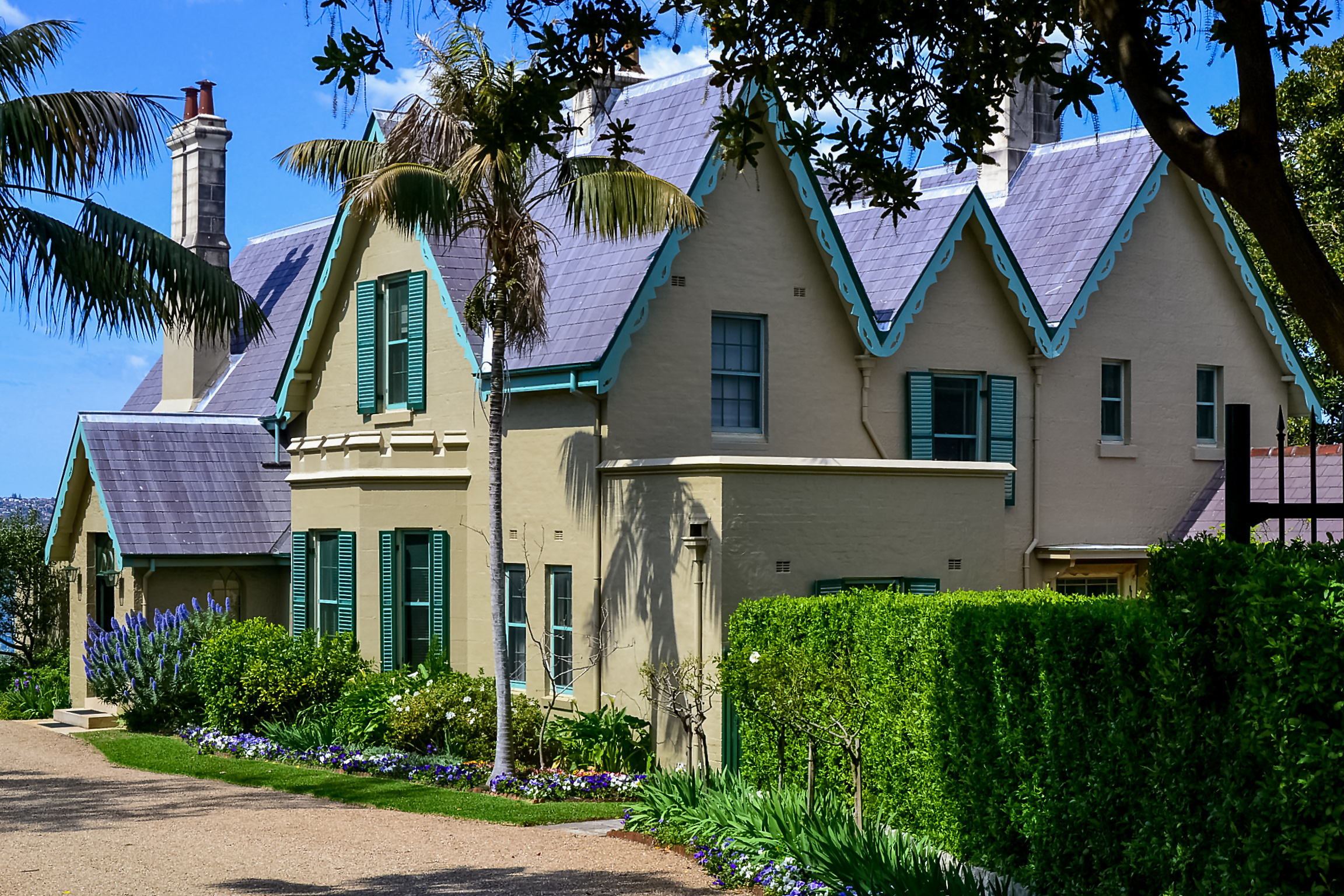
House entrance

== Gallery ==
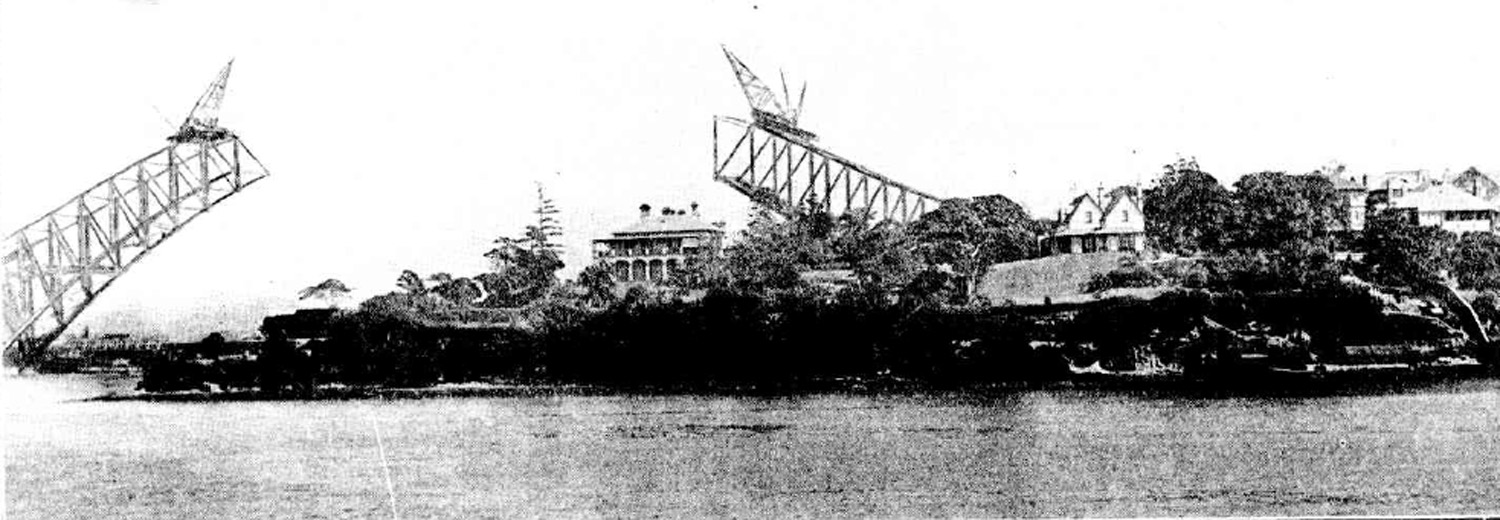
Kirribilli and Admiralty House with construction of the Sydney Harbour Bridge in the background, 1930

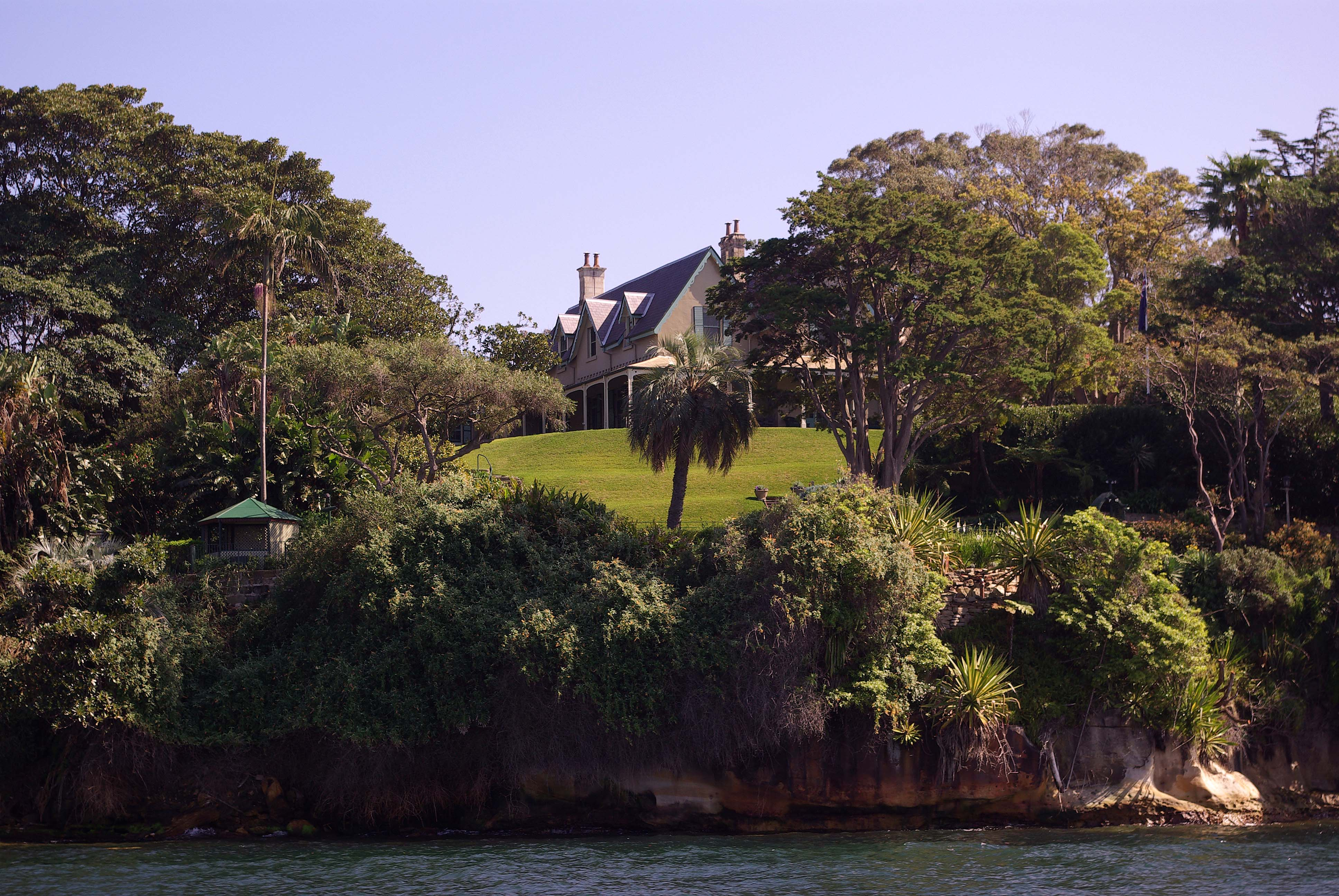
Kirribilli House pictured from Sydney Harbour, 2007

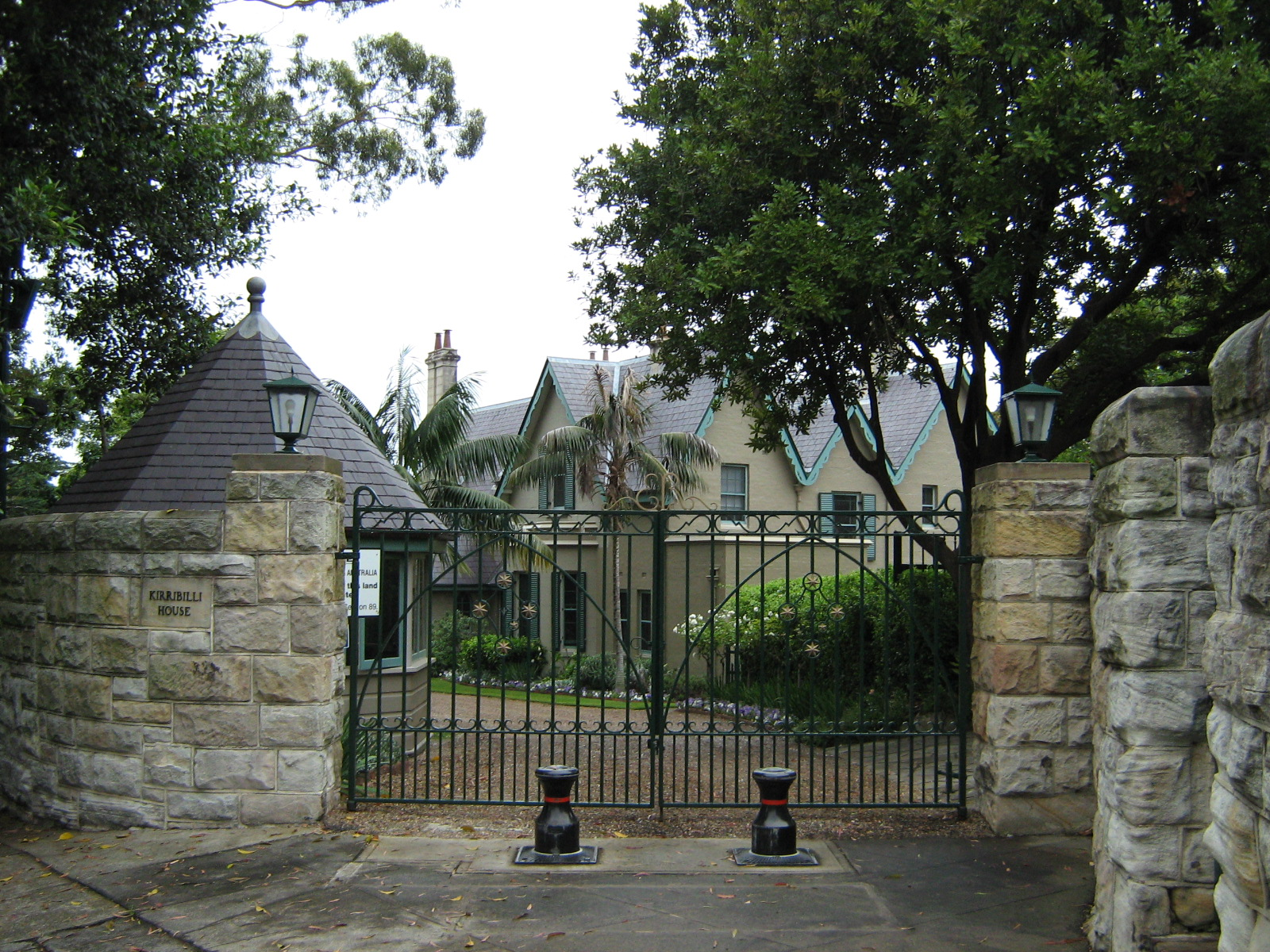
Gates of Kirribilli House, 2007
