= Prime Minister of Australia =

Head of government

- Coat of arms of Australia

- Flag of Australia

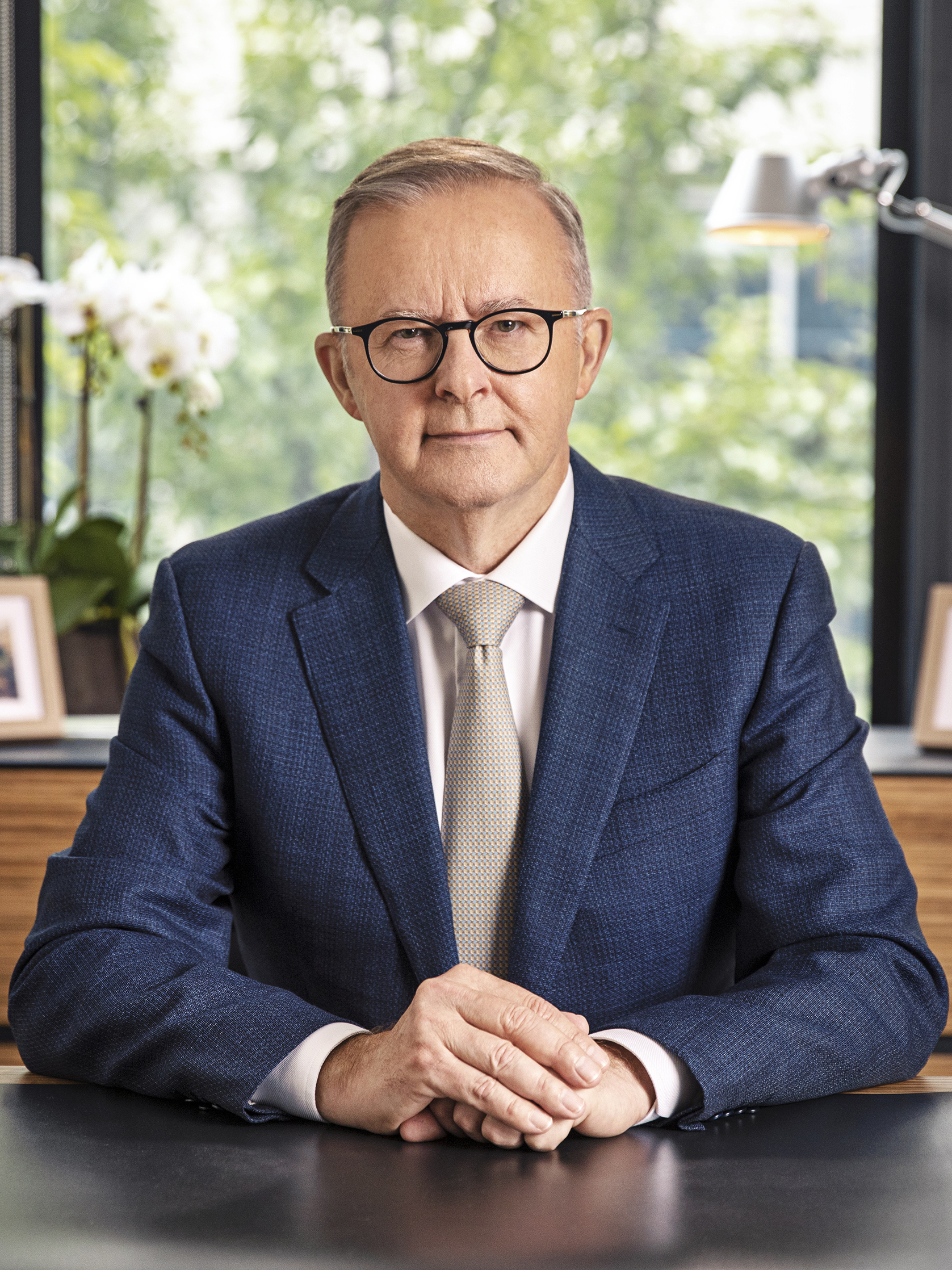
- Incumbent; Anthony Albanese since 23 May 2022
- Australian Government; Department of the Prime Minister and Cabinet
- Style: Prime Minister (informal); The Honourable (formal); His Excellency (diplomatic)
- Status: Head of government
- Member of: House of Representatives; Cabinet; National Cabinet
- Reports to: Governor-General; Parliament
- Residence: The Lodge (primary); Kirribilli House (secondary)
- Seat: Prime Minister's Suite, Parliament House
- Appointer: Governor-General (according to the wishes of the House of Representatives)
- Formation: 1 January 1901; 125 years ago
- First holder: Edmund Barton
- Deputy: Deputy Prime Minister
- Salary: $586,930 (2023)
- Website: pm.gov.au

The prime minister of Australia (Note: Formally the Prime Minister of the Commonwealth or the Prime Minister of the Commonwealth of Australia.) is the head of government of the Commonwealth of Australia. The prime minister is the chair of the Cabinet of Australia and thus the head of the federal executive government. Under the principles of responsible government, the prime minister is a member of, and accountable to, the Commonwealth Parliament. The current prime minister is Anthony Albanese of the Australian Labor Party, who assumed office on 23 May 2022.

The role and duties of the prime minister are not specified in the Australian Constitution, but rather, are defined by constitutional convention deriving from the Westminster system and responsible government. The prime minister is formally appointed by the governor-general, who is ordinarily (Note: The only exception to this practice since the appointment of the first prime minister in 1901 was during the 1975 Australian constitutional crisis, in which the governor-general, John Kerr, dismissed the incumbent prime minister, Gough Whitlam, and appointed Malcolm Fraser as caretaker prime minister, despite Fraser not commanding a legislative majority in the lower house. The crisis was eventually resolved through the 1975 federal election, in which Fraser’s party won a landslide victory and secured an electoral mandate to govern.) constrained by convention to choose the parliamentarian who is able to command the confidence of the House of Representatives (the lower house). This has almost always been the leader of the majority party or coalition. In cases where there is no clear parliamentary majority, the governor-general may appoint whichever party leader can secure confidence and supply, which is normally obtained through an agreement with crossbench MPs. In practice, the prime minister most often changes after an election results in a different party gaining control of the lower house, or as a result of the governing party undergoing a change of leadership between elections.

The office of prime minister comes with various privileges, including the use of two official residences: The Lodge in Canberra and Kirribilli House in Sydney, as well as an office at Parliament House.

Thirty-one people (thirty men and one woman) have served as prime minister. The first was Edmund Barton, who took office on 1 January 1901 following the federation of the British colonies in Australia. The longest-serving prime minister was Robert Menzies, who served over 18 years, and the shortest-serving was Frank Forde, who served one week.

== Powers and responsibilities ==
In common with other political systems based on the Westminster system, the prime minister both leads the executive government and wields significant power in Parliament.

=== Executive role ===
Cabinet, the primary decision-making body of the executive government, is chaired by the prime minister. While the prime minister has been described as the "first among equals" of the other ministers that make up cabinet, they nevertheless wield primary influence in the body. They set the agenda and processes of cabinet meetings and have the final word where a collective decision cannot be reached. Ministers making up the cabinet are chosen by the prime minister and may be removed at any time. Additionally, the prime minister chooses the portfolio of each minister and a prime minister's resignation or dismissal leads by convention to the resignation of all other ministers. The precise authority of each individual prime minister within cabinet is uncertain, as their deliberations are secret. The prime minister also has the authority to make policy decisions independently from cabinet, with such decisions colloquially called "captain's calls". The prime minister also has significant influence in the setting of foreign policy, through their role as chair of the National Security Committee, a sub-committee of cabinet whose decisions do not need to be endorsed by the cabinet as a whole.

The prime minister is also one of the responsible ministers for the Department of the Prime Minister and Cabinet, whose tasks include general policy development across the government, inter-governmental communications, honours and symbols policy and Indigenous programmes.

=== Legislative role ===
Since the emergence of the strong party system in Australia in the 1920s, prime ministers have almost always been the parliamentary leader of the party (or leader of the senior party in a coalition of parties) that has a majority in the House of Representatives (which has been either the Labor Party or the Liberal Party in coalition with the National Party since the 1940s). Responsible government has always required the prime minister and government to have the confidence of a majority of the lower house in order to govern, however the emergence of strong parties with members strongly punished for voting against party policy (also known as crossing the floor) has meant that most prime ministers and governments have significant control over the passage of bills in this house. However, bills must also be passed by the Senate (the upper house) in order to become law and the government rarely has a majority in this house, leading to some checks on the legislative powers of the government. The prime minister also controls the date of elections, through formal advice to the governor-general, with such elections usually occurring within a 6-month period prior to the maximum 3-year term of the House of Representatives expiring.

=== Other responsibilities ===
National Cabinet, the primary inter-governmental decision-making forum between the federal government and the states, is also chaired by the prime minister. While called a cabinet, the body is merely a discussion forum and the principles of secrecy and collective decision making do not apply.

Since the 1940s, the prime minister has asserted their authority to select the governor-general alone, instead of this being a cabinet decision. The power is exercised through advice to the King of Australia, who holds the de jure power to make the appointment and is by convention bound to accept such advice. The prime minister can also advise the monarch to dismiss the governor-general, though it remains unclear how quickly the monarch would act on such advice in a constitutional crisis. This uncertainty, and the possibility of a race between the governor-general and prime minister to dismiss the other, was a key question in the 1975 constitutional crisis.

== Selection and constitutional basis ==
In ordinary circumstances, the leader of the party or coalition that has the confidence of the House of Representatives is entitled to become prime minister and form a government. Generally, a party or coalition will have a majority in the lower house in order to provide confidence, however in periods of minority government, the larger party will rely on confidence and supply from minor parties or independents. By convention, the prime minister must be a member of the lower house. The only case where a member of the Senate was appointed prime minister was John Gorton, who subsequently resigned his Senate position and was elected as the member for Higgins in the House of Representatives. The prime minister is formally appointed to the role by the governor-general under section 64 of the Australian Constitution, however their choice is limited in normal circumstances to the individual with the confidence of the lower house. However, the prime minister (and all other ministers) must be a parliamentarian or become one within three months to be a minister.

There are no term limits for the prime minister, and they are generally entitled to continue in their role whilst they retain the confidence of the lower house. Individuals most commonly cease to become prime minister after losing an election by not obtaining a majority in the lower house (at which point they generally become leader of the opposition or resign) or through replacement by their parliamentary party colleagues. This later method has become increasingly common, with the office changing hands four times due to parliamentary spill and only twice due to an election in the period following the election defeat of John Howard in 2007 to the election of Anthony Albanese in 2022.

A prime minister may also lose their position following a vote of no confidence in the government or due to a failure to pass supply through the lower house. In either event, the prime minister is required by convention to either resign or call an election. Whether a prime minister is required to resign or call an election following an inability to pass supply through the Senate was the animating issue of the 1975 constitutional crisis. In that event, governor-general Sir John Kerr dismissed the Whitlam government following the Senate's deferral of the government's budget and demand that they would not pass supply until the government called an election. The constitutional propriety of the governor-general's action during that period remains subject to vigorous debate.

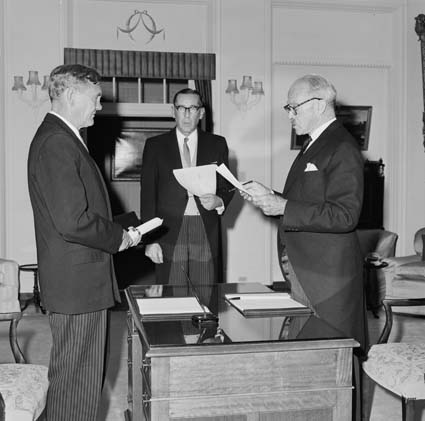
John Gorton being sworn in as the 19th Prime Minister on 10 January 1968. To date, Gorton is the only Senator to have served as Prime Minister, though he would swiftly move to the House of Representatives as the member for Higgins.

Despite the importance of the office of prime minister, the Constitution does not mention the office by name. The conventions of the Westminster system were thought to be sufficiently entrenched in Australia by the authors of the Constitution that it was deemed unnecessary to detail these. Indeed, prior to Federation in 1901 the terms "premier" and "prime minister" were used interchangeably for the head of government in a colony.

Following a resignation in other circumstances or the death of a prime minister, the governor-general generally appoints the deputy prime minister as the new prime minister, until or if such time as the governing party or senior coalition party elects an alternative party leader. This has resulted in the party leaders from the Country Party (now named National Party) being appointed as prime minister, despite being the smaller party of their coalition. This occurred when Earle Page became caretaker prime minister following the death of Joseph Lyons in 1939, and when John McEwen became caretaker prime minister following the disappearance of Harold Holt in 1967. However, in 1941, Arthur Fadden became the leader of the Coalition and subsequently prime minister by the agreement of both coalition parties, despite being the leader of the smaller party in coalition, following the resignation of United Australia Party leader Robert Menzies.

Excluding the brief transition periods during changes of government or leadership elections, there have only been a handful of cases where someone other than the leader of the majority party or coalition in the House of Representatives was prime minister:

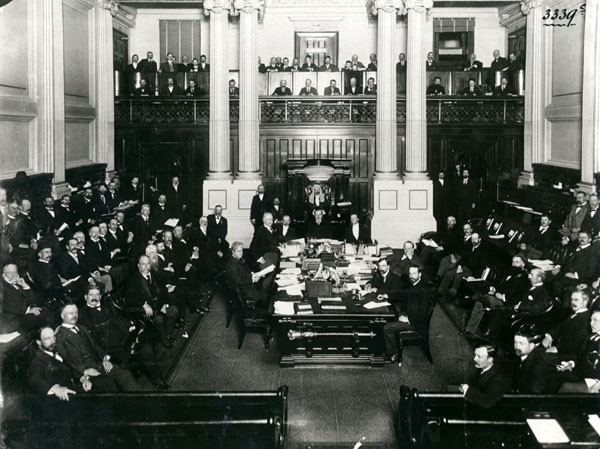
- Australia's first prime minister, Edmund Barton, at the central table in the House of Representatives in 1901.
  Federation occurred on 1 January 1901, but elections for the first parliament were not scheduled until late March. In the interim, an unelected caretaker government was necessary. In what is now known as the Hopetoun Blunder, the governor-general, Lord Hopetoun, invited Sir William Lyne, the premier of the most populous state, New South Wales, to form a government. However, no politician would agree to be a member of his Cabinet and Lyne returned his commission before Federation actually took place. The governor-general instead then commissioned the much more popular Edmund Barton, who became the first prime minister on Federation and led the inaugural government into and beyond the election.
- During the second parliament, three parties (Free Trade, Protectionist and Labor) had roughly equal representation in the House of Representatives. The leaders of the three parties, Alfred Deakin, George Reid and Chris Watson each served as prime minister before losing a vote of confidence.
- As a result of the Labor Party's split over conscription, Billy Hughes and his supporters were expelled from the Labor Party in November 1916. He subsequently continued on as prime minister at the head of the new National Labor Party, which had only 14 members out of a total of 75 in the House of Representatives. The Commonwealth Liberal Party – despite still forming the official Opposition – provided confidence and supply until February 1917, when the two parties agreed to merge and formed the Nationalist Party.
- During the 1975 constitutional crisis, on 11 November 1975, the governor-general, Sir John Kerr, dismissed the Labor Party's Gough Whitlam as prime minister. Despite Labor holding a majority in the House of Representatives, Kerr appointed the Leader of the Opposition, Liberal leader Malcolm Fraser as caretaker prime minister, conditional on the passage of the Whitlam government's Supply bills through the Senate and the calling of an election for both houses of parliament. Fraser accepted these terms and immediately advised a double dissolution. An election was called for 13 December, which the Liberal Party won in its own right (although the Liberals governed in a coalition with the Country Party).

Compared to other Westminster systems such as those of Canada's federal and provincial governments, the transition from an outgoing prime minister to an incoming prime minister has been brief in Australia since the 1970s. Prior to that, in accordance with longstanding Australian constitutional practice, convention held that an outgoing prime minister would stay on as a caretaker until the full election results were tallied. Starting with the 1972 Australian federal election on 2 December 1972, Gough Whitlam and his deputy were sworn in on 5 December 1972 to form an interim government for two weeks, as the vote was being finalised and the full ministry makeup was being determined. On 23 May 2022 Anthony Albanese became prime minister with an interim four person ministry, two days after his victory in the election. This rapid shift was done in order for the new PM to attend a Quad meeting scheduled shortly after the election. When the results of the election were more clearly known the entire ministry was sworn in on 1 June 2022.

== Amenities of office ==
=== Salary ===
Prime ministerial salary history
Effective date	Salary	Ref.
2 June 1999	A$289,270	
6 September 2006	A$309,270	
1 July 2007	A$330,356	
1 October 2009	A$340,704	
1 August 2010	A$354,671	
1 July 2011	A$366,366	
1 December 2011	A$440,000	
15 March 2012	A$481,000	
1 July 2012	A$495,430	
1 July 2013	A$507,338	
1 January 2016	A$517,504	
1 July 2017	A$527,852	
1 July 2018	A$538,460	
1 July 2019	A$549,250	
27 August 2023	A$586,950	

As of 27 August 2023, Australia's prime minister is paid a total salary of A$586,950. This is made up of the 'base salary' received by all members of parliament (A$225,750) plus a 160 percent 'additional salary' for the role of prime minister. Increases in the base salary of MPs and senators are determined annually by the independent Remuneration Tribunal.

=== Residences and transport ===
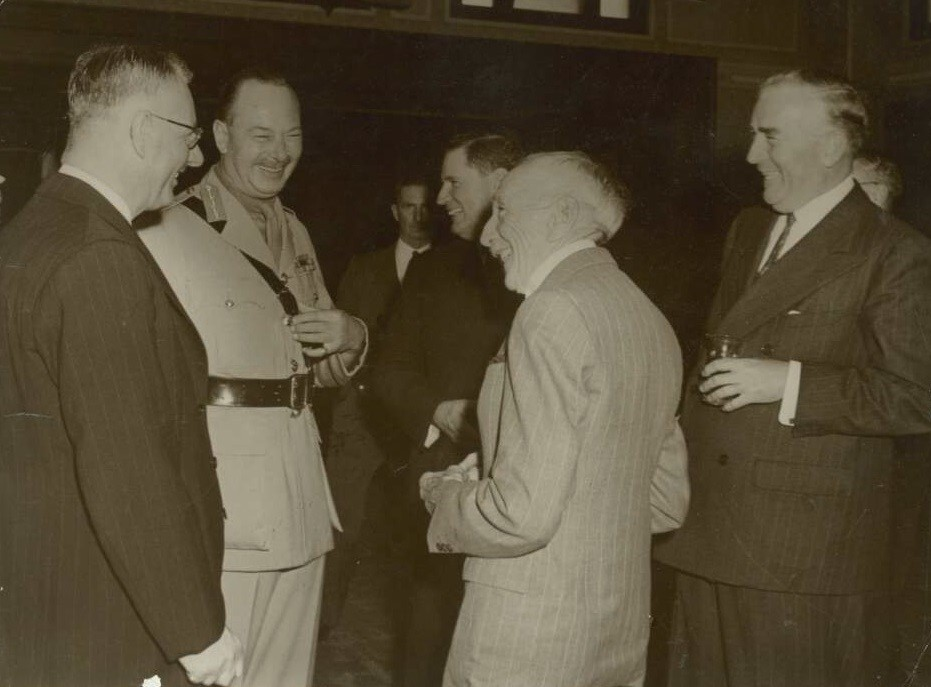
Prime ministers Curtin, Fadden, Hughes, Menzies and Governor-General The Duke of Gloucester 2nd from left, in 1945.

The prime minister has two official residences. The primary official residence is the Lodge in Canberra. Most prime ministers have chosen the Lodge as their primary residence because of its security facilities and close proximity to Parliament House. There have been some exceptions, however. James Scullin preferred to live at the Hotel Canberra (now the Hyatt Hotel) and Ben Chifley lived in the Hotel Kurrajong. More recently, John Howard used the Sydney prime ministerial residence, Kirribilli House, as his primary accommodation. On her appointment on 24 June 2010, Julia Gillard said she would not be living in the Lodge until such time as she was returned to office by popular vote at the next general election, as she became prime minister by replacing an incumbent during a parliamentary term. Tony Abbott was never able to occupy the Lodge during his term (2013–15) because it was undergoing extensive renovations, which continued into the early part of his successor Malcolm Turnbull's term. Instead, Abbott resided in dedicated rooms at the Australian Federal Police College when in Canberra.

During his first term, Rudd had a staff at the Lodge consisting of a senior chef and an assistant chef, a child carer, one senior house attendant, and two junior house attendants. At Kirribilli House in Sydney, there are a full-time chef and a full-time house attendant. The official residences are fully staffed and catered for both the prime minister and their family. In addition, both have extensive security facilities. These residences are regularly used for official entertaining, such as receptions for Australian of the Year finalists.

The prime minister receives a number of transport amenities for official business. A Royal Australian Air Force operated Airbus KC-30A, transports the prime minister overseas, with two Boeing 737 MAX 8 planes available for shorter flights. For ground travel, the prime minister is transported in an armoured BMW 7 Series model. It is referred to as "C-1", or Commonwealth One, because of its number plate. It is escorted by police vehicles from state and federal authorities.

Privileges of office

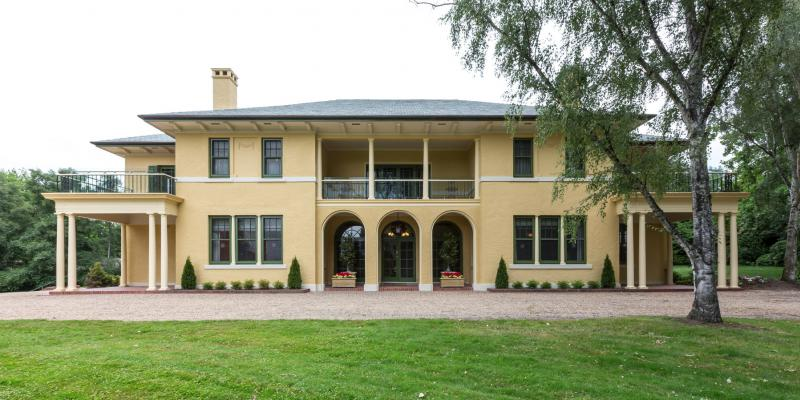
The Lodge

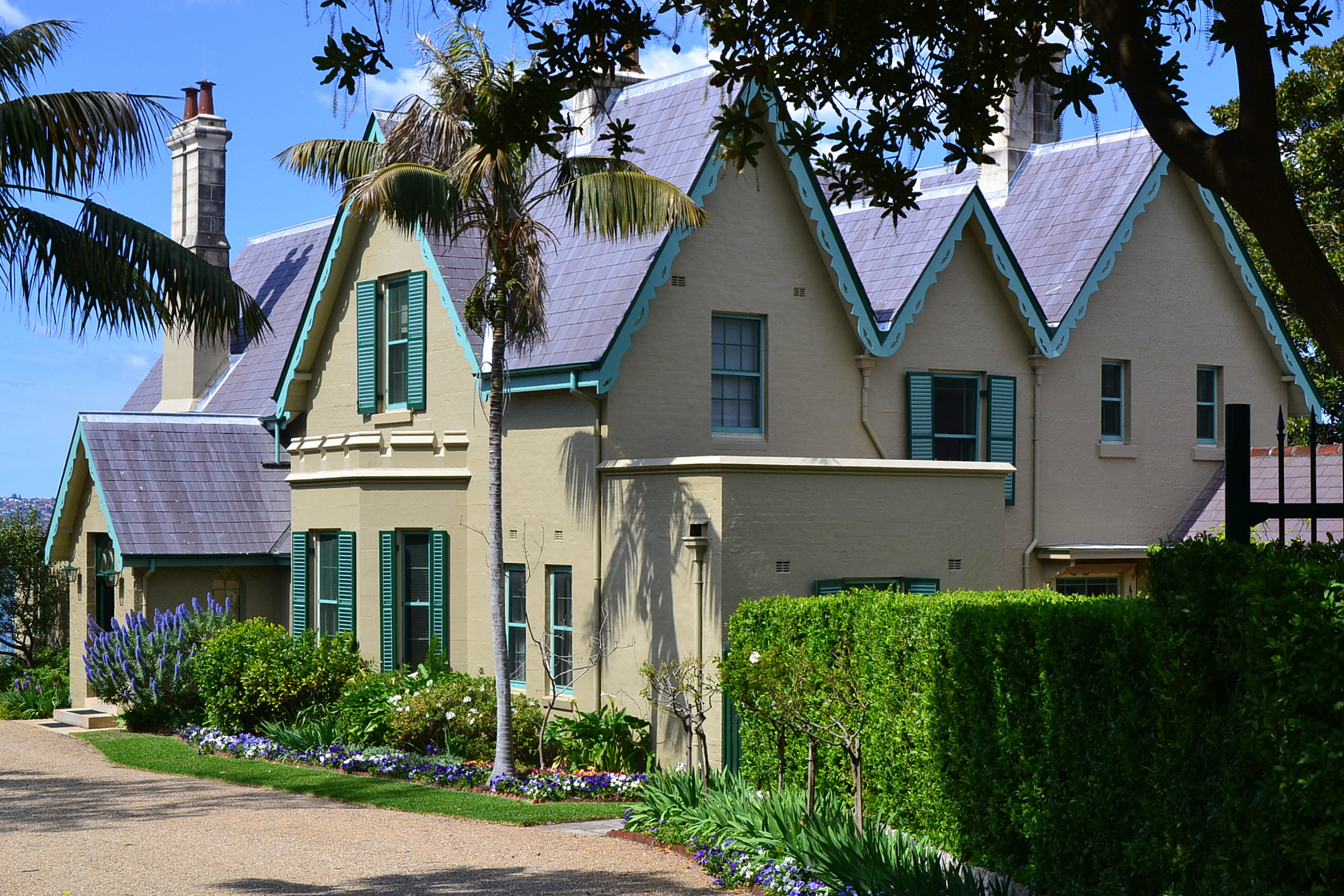
Kirribilli House

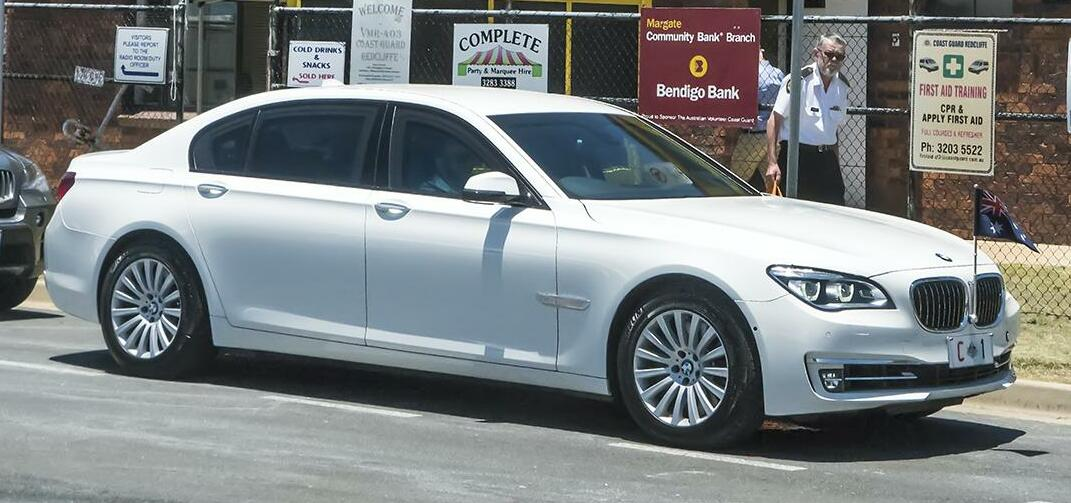
Prime Ministerial Limousine

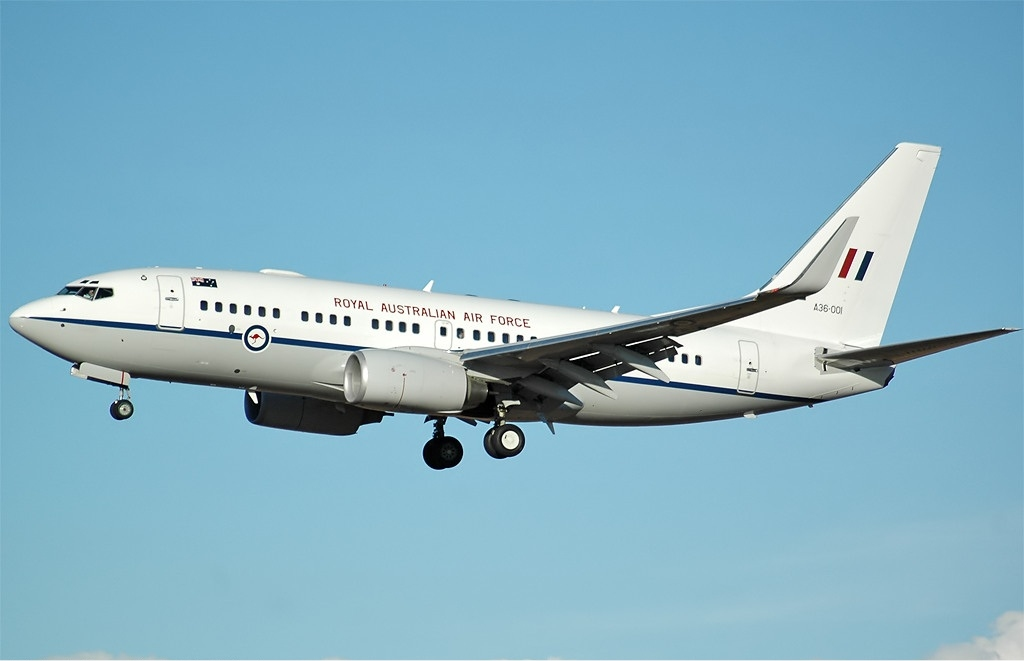
Official aircraft (2000–2024)

=== After office ===
Politicians, including prime ministers, are usually granted certain privileges after leaving office, such as office accommodation, staff assistance, and a Life Gold Pass which entitles the holder to travel within Australia for non-commercial purposes at government expense. In 2017, then prime minister Malcolm Turnbull said the pass should be available only to former prime ministers, though he would not use it when he was no longer PM.

Only one prime minister who had left the Federal Parliament ever returned. Stanley Bruce was defeated in his own seat in 1929 while prime minister but was re-elected to parliament in 1931. Other prime ministers were elected to parliaments other than the Australian federal parliament: Sir George Reid was elected to the UK House of Commons (after his term as High Commissioner to the UK), and Frank Forde was re-elected to the Queensland Parliament (after his term as High Commissioner to Canada, and a failed attempt to re-enter the Federal Parliament).

As well as Reid and Forde, five other prime ministers went on to hold diplomatic posts.

Andrew Fisher, Joseph Cook and Stanley Bruce also served as High Commissioners to the United Kingdom, Gough Whitlam had served as Ambassador to UNESCO and Kevin Rudd served as Ambassador to the United States.

== Acting prime ministers and succession ==
The deputy prime minister becomes acting prime minister if the prime minister is unable to undertake the role for a short time, for example if they are ill, overseas or on leave (and if both are unavailable, then another senior minister takes on this role). The Acts Interpretation Act 1901 confers upon acting ministers "the same power and authority with respect to the absent Minister's statutory responsibilities". Anthony Albanese has authorised the following ministers to act on his behalf (in this order) where he is overseas or otherwise unavailable: Richard Marles (deputy prime minister), Penny Wong (minister for foreign affairs), Jim Chalmers (treasurer), Katy Gallagher (minister for finance, women, the public service and government services), and Don Farrell (special minister of state and minister for trade and tourism).

If the prime minister were to die, then the deputy prime minister would be appointed prime minister by the governor-general until the government votes for another member to be its leader. This happened when Harold Holt disappeared in 1967, when John McEwen was appointed prime minister. On the other two occasions that the prime minister has died in office, in 1939 and 1945, Earle Page and Frank Forde, respectively, were appointed prime minister.

In the early 20th century, overseas travel generally required long journeys by ship. As a result, some held the position of acting prime minister for significant periods of time, including William Watt (16 months, 1918–1919), George Pearce (7 months, 1916), Alfred Deakin (6 months, 1902), Joseph Cook (5 months, 1921), James Fenton (19 weeks, 1930–1931), John Forrest (4 months, 1907), and Arthur Fadden (4 months, 1941). Fadden was acting prime minister for a cumulative total of 676 days (over 22 months) between 1941 and 1958.

== Honours ==
Prime ministers have been granted numerous honours, typically after their period as prime minister has concluded, with a few exceptions.

Nine former prime ministers were awarded knighthoods: Barton (GCMG, 1902), Reid (GCMG, 1911), Cook (GCMG, 1918), Page (GCMG, 1938), Menzies (KT, 1963), Fadden (KCMG, 1951), McEwen (GCMG, 1971), Gorton (GCMG, 1977), and McMahon (GCMG, 1977). Of those awarded, Barton and Menzies were knighted while still serving as prime minister, with Page awarded his before becoming prime minister, and the remainder awarded after leaving office. Reid (GCB, 1916), Menzies (AK, 1976) and Fadden (GCMG, 1958) were awarded a second - higher - knighthood after leaving office.

Non-titular honours were also bestowed on former prime ministers, usually the Order of the Companions of Honour (CH). This honour was awarded to Bruce (1927), Lyons (1936), Hughes (1941), Page (1942), Menzies (1951), Holt (1967), McEwen (1969), Gorton (1971), McMahon (1972), and Fraser (1977), generally during office as prime minister.

In almost all occasions these honours were only accepted by non-Labor/conservative prime ministers. However, appointment to the Privy Council of the United Kingdom was accepted by prime ministers of different political persuasions until 1983 (with the exception of Alfred Deakin, Chris Watson and Gough Whitlam), with Malcolm Fraser being the last prime ministerial appointee.

Since its introduction in 1975, former prime ministers of Australia have been appointed to the Order of Australia and to its highest level, Companion (AC): Whitlam (1978), Fraser (1988), Gorton (1988), Howard (2008), Gillard (2017), Rudd (2019), Abbott (2020), Turnbull (2021), and Morrison (2025). Keating refused appointment in the 1997 Australia Day Honours, saying that he had long believed honours should be reserved for those whose work in the community went unrecognised and that having been prime minister was sufficient public recognition. Bob Hawke was appointed a Companion in 1979, for service to trade unionism and industrial relations, before becoming prime minister in 1983. Menzies was appointed to the higher grade of Knight of the Order, which is no longer awarded, in 1976.

John Howard was also appointed to the Order of Merit (OM) by Queen Elizabeth II in 2012. Appointment within the Order of Merit is in the personal gift of the monarch (i.e. not recommended by the government of the day). Menzies' Knight of the Order of the Thistle awarding - recognising his Scottish heritage - was also in the personal gift of the monarch and Menzies was likewise appointed by Elizabeth II in 1963.

Although not strictly an honour, one former prime minister was raised to the peerage; Stanley Bruce was created 1st Viscount Bruce of Melbourne in the 1947 New Year Honours.

In addition to these honours, all deceased former prime ministers of Australia currently have federal electorates named after them. (Note: The Division of Cook jointly recognises former prime minister Sir Joseph Cook and explorer Sir James Cook.) The most newly created of these electorates is the Division of Hawke, named in honour of the recently deceased Bob Hawke in 2021.

== Lists relating to the prime ministers of Australia ==
The longest-serving prime minister was Robert Menzies, who served in office twice: from 26 April 1939 to 28 August 1941, and again from 19 December 1949 to 26 January 1966. In total Robert Menzies spent 18 years, 5 months and 12 days in office. He served under the United Australia Party and the Liberal Party respectively.

The shortest-serving prime minister was Frank Forde, who was appointed to the position on 6 July 1945 after the death of John Curtin, and served until 13 July 1945 when Ben Chifley was elected leader of the Australian Labor Party.

Lists of the 31 people who have so far held the premiership:

- List of prime ministers of Australia
- List of prime ministers of Australia by birthplace
- List of prime ministers of Australia by time in office

== See also ==
- Historical rankings of prime ministers of Australia
- List of prime ministers of Australia by time in office
- List of prime ministers of Elizabeth II
- List of prime ministers of Charles III
- Chief of Staff to the Prime Minister
- Prime Minister's Office
- Leader of the Opposition (Australia)
- List of Commonwealth heads of government
- Spouse of the prime minister of Australia
- Prime Minister's XI
- Prime Ministers Avenue
- Prime Ministers' Corridor of Oaks
