= Tim Mathieson =

Australian hairdresser and partner of Prime Minister Julia Gillard

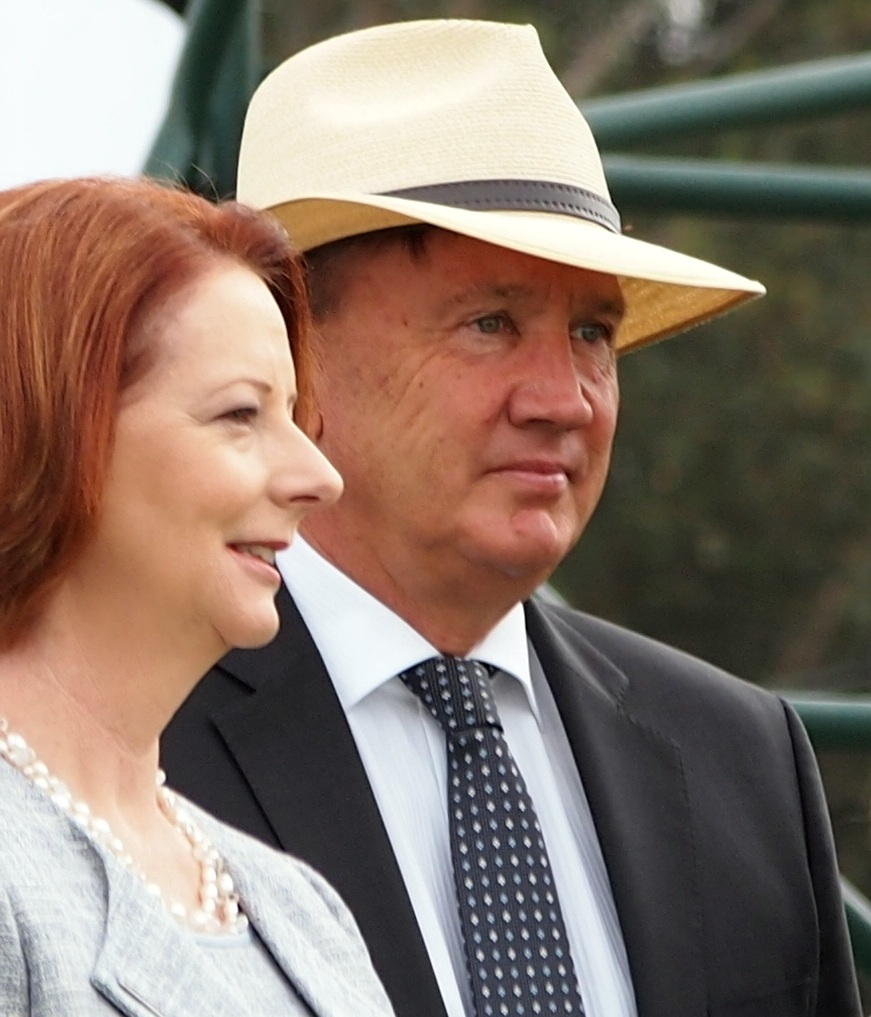
- Mathieson with Julia Gillard in 2013

Partner of the Prime Minister of Australia
- In role 24 June 2010 – 27 June 2013
- Preceded by: Thérèse Rein
- Succeeded by: Thérèse Rein

Personal details
- Born: Timothy Raymond Mathieson; 1957 (age 68–69) Shepparton, Victoria, Australia
- Spouse: Diane Stark (m. 1987; div. 2003)
- Domestic partner(s): Julia Gillard (2006–2021)
- Children: 3
- Education: Shepparton High School
- Occupation: Hairdresser

Timothy Raymond Mathieson (born 1957) is an Australian hairdresser and the former domestic partner of Julia Gillard, the 27th prime minister of Australia from 2010 to 2013. Mathieson entered the public spotlight when he became Gillard's partner in 2006 while she was deputy leader of the Australian Labor Party. His relationship with Gillard ended in 2021.

== Early life and career ==
Mathieson was born and raised in Shepparton, Victoria. After a hairdressing apprenticeship in suburban Melbourne, he first operated a Shepparton hair salon, then another on the Gold Coast, Queensland. For much of the 1990s, Mathieson lived and worked in San Francisco in the United States.

Mathieson returned to Australia in 2004, worked for one year as a hairdresser at Heading Out salon in Melbourne, where he met long-standing salon client, politician Julia Gillard. They began dating in March 2006. With financial support from his father and brother, Mathieson established Tim Mathieson Hair in Shepparton but moved back to Melbourne later in 2006 as a sales representative for a hair products company. From January to March 2010, Mathieson focused on the sale of high-rise apartments in Melbourne to international buyers on behalf of a local real estate agency.

Once Gillard became prime minister in June 2010, Mathieson supported her by assuming an unpaid behind-the-scenes role.

=== Public life ===
In November 2008, Minister for Health and Ageing Nicola Roxon appointed Mathieson as one of the government's unpaid men's health ambassadors. He later became an ambassador for Kidney Health Australia, a patron of the Australian Men's Shed Association and involved with the Indigenous Diabetes Association in Alice Springs and Beyond Blue mental health group. In December 2010, Mathieson was appointed patron of the National Portrait Gallery.

In January 2013, Mathieson attracted media attention for a joke he made while advocating for prostate examinations, advising men to seek out "a small Asian female doctor" when receiving a rectal prostate exam. After commentators considered his remark inappropriate and in poor taste, he apologised.

== Personal life ==
While in his late teens during the 1970s, Mathieson fathered a daughter with his girlfriend Pam Child. In 1987, Mathieson married Diane Stark; they had a son and a daughter together and divorced in 2003. In March 2006, Mathieson started dating Julia Gillard. When asked in 2010 about formal marriage to Gillard, he said that they had not discussed it at that stage. Mathieson's relationship with Gillard ended in 2021.

In July 2023, Mathieson pleaded guilty to a charge of sexual assault after non-consensually sucking the nipple of a sleeping woman and "latching onto her breast when she tried to fend him off" in March 2022. Mathieson was convicted in October 2023 and fined $7,000.

Honorary titles
Preceded by Thérèse Rein	Spouse of the Prime Minister of Australia; 24 June 2010 – 26 June 2013	Succeeded by Thérèse Rein
