= Van Iersel =

Van Iersel is a Dutch toponymic surname meaning "from/of Iersel", a regional spelling of the town Eersel in North Brabant. Variant forms are "van Ierssel," "van Iersel," "van Irsel". Notable people with the surname include:

- Annita van Iersel (born 1948), Australian painter
- Kees van Ierssel (born 1945), Dutch football defender
- Ludovicus M. M. Van Iersel (1893–1987), United States Army soldier and Medal of Honor recipient
- Marleen van Iersel (born 1988), Dutch beach volleyball player
- Robin van Iersel (born 1995), Dutch biologist
