= Margie Abbott =

Australian businesswoman

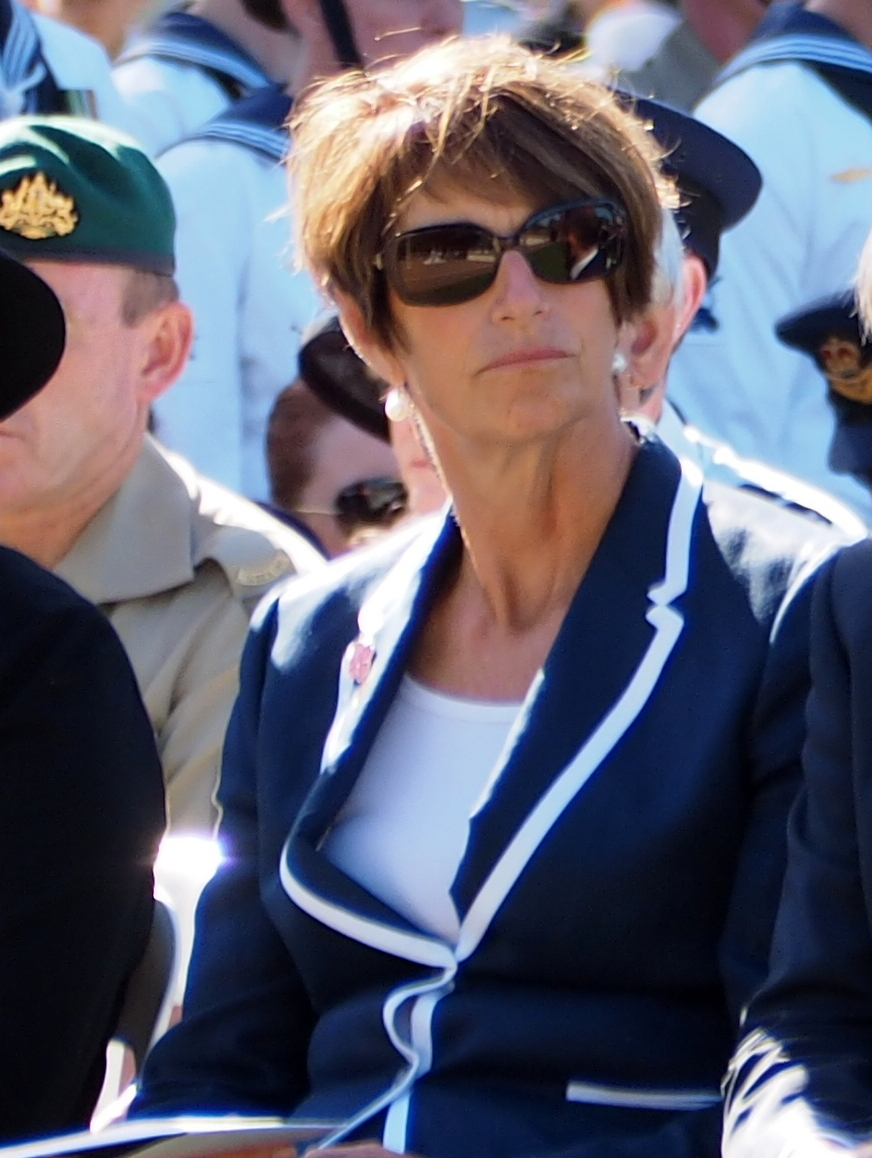
- Abbott in 2015

Spouse of the Prime Minister of Australia
- In role 18 September 2013 – 15 September 2015
- Preceded by: Thérèse Rein
- Succeeded by: Lucy Turnbull

Personal details
- Born: Margaret Veronica Aitken; 1 February 1958 (age 68) Lower Hutt, New Zealand
- Spouse: Tony Abbott (m. 1988)
- Children: 3
- Education: Wellington Teachers College
- Occupation: Schoolteacher, businesswoman

Margaret Veronica Abbott (née Aitken; born 1 February 1958) is a New Zealand businesswoman best known as the wife of Tony Abbott, the 28th prime minister of Australia (2013–2015). She runs a childcare centre in Sydney.

== Early life ==
Margaret Veronica Aitken was born at Hutt Hospital, Lower Hutt, New Zealand to Max and Gail Aitken, and grew up in Wainuiomata. Both parents worked for the Post Office, Max as deputy chief postmaster of Wellington, and Gail as a typist. She has a brother, Greg, a former private investigator. The family has always been very sport-oriented; Max Aitken is a senior soccer administrator, and Abbott played soccer and netball for several years. She is a Catholic, like her husband.

Her father is a member of the New Zealand Labour Party, and her mother is a Labour voter. There were pictures of Labour leaders in the kitchen of the family home. Abbott was also briefly a member of the Labour Party.

Abbott attended Fernlea School and Wainuiomata College, where, among other studies, she took part in a pioneering Māori-language course. At the age of 16, she entered the Wellington Teachers' College, and after graduation taught primary school in Upper Hutt and Wainuiomata. She taught Māori both there and later in Australia.

== Career ==
After leaving teaching, she worked at a recruitment firm, and in 1983 followed her boss to Sydney, Australia. She then moved to the marketing department of a merchant bank in Sydney. She eventually opened a not-for-profit child care centre in St Ives, Sydney, which employs 10 staff and cares for children from around 100 families. She continued as a director of the centre after her husband became prime minister.

== Marriage and children ==
She met Tony Abbott at a Sydney pub in 1988; he was then a journalist with The Bulletin , and they married on 24 September 1988, and have three daughters (Louise, Frances, and Bridget), and became grandparents in 2021.

== Wife of the prime minister ==
Abbott kept a relatively low profile during her husband's tenure as prime minister, giving only a handful of interviews. She continued living in Sydney – neither she nor her husband lived at The Lodge, the usual prime minister's residence in Canberra, as it was undergoing renovations.

In September 2013, Abbott attracted media attention when she made comments apparently supportive of same-sex marriage; her husband was one of its most prominent opponents. She told the media, "I suppose at the end of the day I think that love, commitment, are things that should be recognised and I think it's a conversation that Australia needs to have".

In May 2014, Tim Mathieson, the partner of former prime minister Julia Gillard, gave an interview in which he said he was "disappointed that Margie Abbott is not doing any charity work [...] she has not contributed to any of them". In response, the Prime Minister's Office issued a list of the charities with which she was involved.

Honorary titles
Preceded by Thérèse Rein	Spouse of the Prime Minister of Australia; 2013–2015	Succeeded by Lucy Turnbull
