= Men's health in Australia =

Males make up just under half of the total Australian population of 23 million. On average Australian males live to around 78 years of age, with the life expectancy of an Indigenous Australian male in 2009 being around 67 years of age and non indigenous men in remote areas living to around 70. On average female mortality rates are lower than males across the entire age spectrum.

Men's health in Australia encompasses a range of areas, including but not limited to, mental, physical and social well-being. Some of the major issues in these areas, impacting men of all ages, are smoking, alcohol, obesity, lack of exercise and prostate cancer. Some of these issues are preventable; however, when not acknowledged they often lead to a restricted lifestyle, prolonged illness or death. Australian males make a substantial contribution to all areas of Australia including paid and unpaid work, in 2009 there were nearly six million males over the age of 15 in paid employment. According to de Vaus, Gray and Stanton $10.3 billion worth of unpaid work, per year, is contributed by men between the ages of 65 and 74 years of age. However, research shows that in many areas of health, Australia's males have poorer outcomes than their female counterparts. Having a population of healthy males is important, not only for each individual but for their family, friends, communities and Australian society as a whole.

In 2007, the Australian government, as part of an election commitment, promised to develop the first 'National Male Health Policy'. The policy was released in 2010 by the Department of Health and Ageing (DoHa) and was titled the "National Male Health Policy: Building on the Strengths of Australian Males". This policy uses the World Health Organization's definition of health, which is: "complete physical, mental and social well being and not merely the absence of disease and infirmity". Added to this, as part of a holistic approach, is the spiritual dimension of health and well-being.

== Department of Health and Ageing – National Male Health Policy ==
The DoHa policy focuses on six key action areas:

- Optimal health outcomes for males
- Health equity between different population groups of males
- Improved health for males at different life stages
- A focus on preventive health for males, particularly regarding chronic disease and injury
- Building a strong evidence base on male health and using it to inform policies, programs and initiatives, and;
- Improved access to health care for males through initiatives and tailored healthcare services, particularly for male population groups at risk of poor health.

== Mental health ==
Men often have trouble identifying when they may be suffering from a mental health condition. Mental health is an important part of the overall health and wellbeing of males and encompasses a range of differing disorders, each with its own issues. These disorders can impact males in varying ways, from loss of employment, relationship breakdowns, to suicide to name a few. The suicide rate, across all age groups, is higher for males than for females, the median age of men who suicided was 43.8 years of age. Some age groups of men are three times more likely than women to die by suicide and yet women attempt suicide more than men.

The 2007 Survey of Mental Health and Well being in Australia revealed that a mental disorder had been experienced by 48% of Australian males aged 16–85 and about 18%, had an existing mental disorder and had experienced symptoms twelve months prior to the survey.

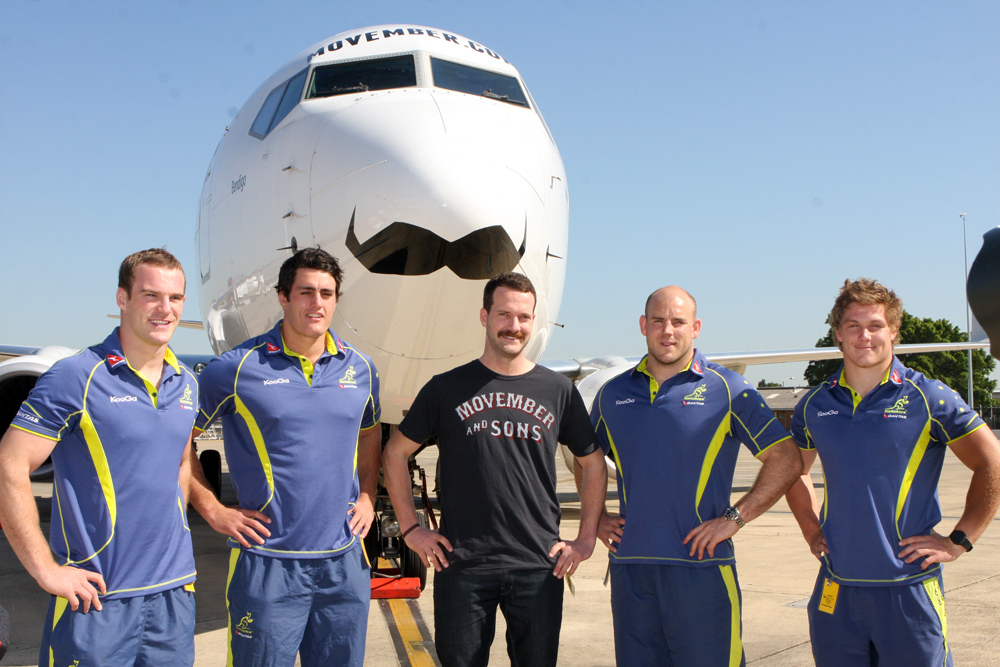

The Beyondblue Depression Monitor revealed that in 2007–08:

- Males were less likely than females to consider that mental health issues were a major health problem in Australia
- 21 per cent of males, compared to 10 per cent of females, did not know what the major mental health problems are, and
- Only 45 per cent of males, compared to 66 per cent of females, stated that depression is a major mental health problem.

== Physical health ==
Physical exercise is an integral part of Australian cultural, from team sports, recreational pursuits or individual fitness; around two-thirds of Australian males participated in some kind of physical activity in between 2009 and 2010. The type of activity and facilities used differed, with walking and outdoor facilities ranking as the most popular and cycling and structured facilities as the least popular. An ABS survey done in 2009–10, found that the age of a male influenced his involvement in sport, with the highest participation being among 15- to 17-year-olds and the lowest being men 60 years and over, with participation in some kind of physical activity being around 60%. Among the main physical health problems that are life-threatening for men in Australia are stroke, type 2 diabetes, chronic lower respiratory disease, blood and lymph cancer, lung cancer, prostate cancer and colorectal cancer with the leading cause of death in males being ischaemic heart disease.

== Social health ==
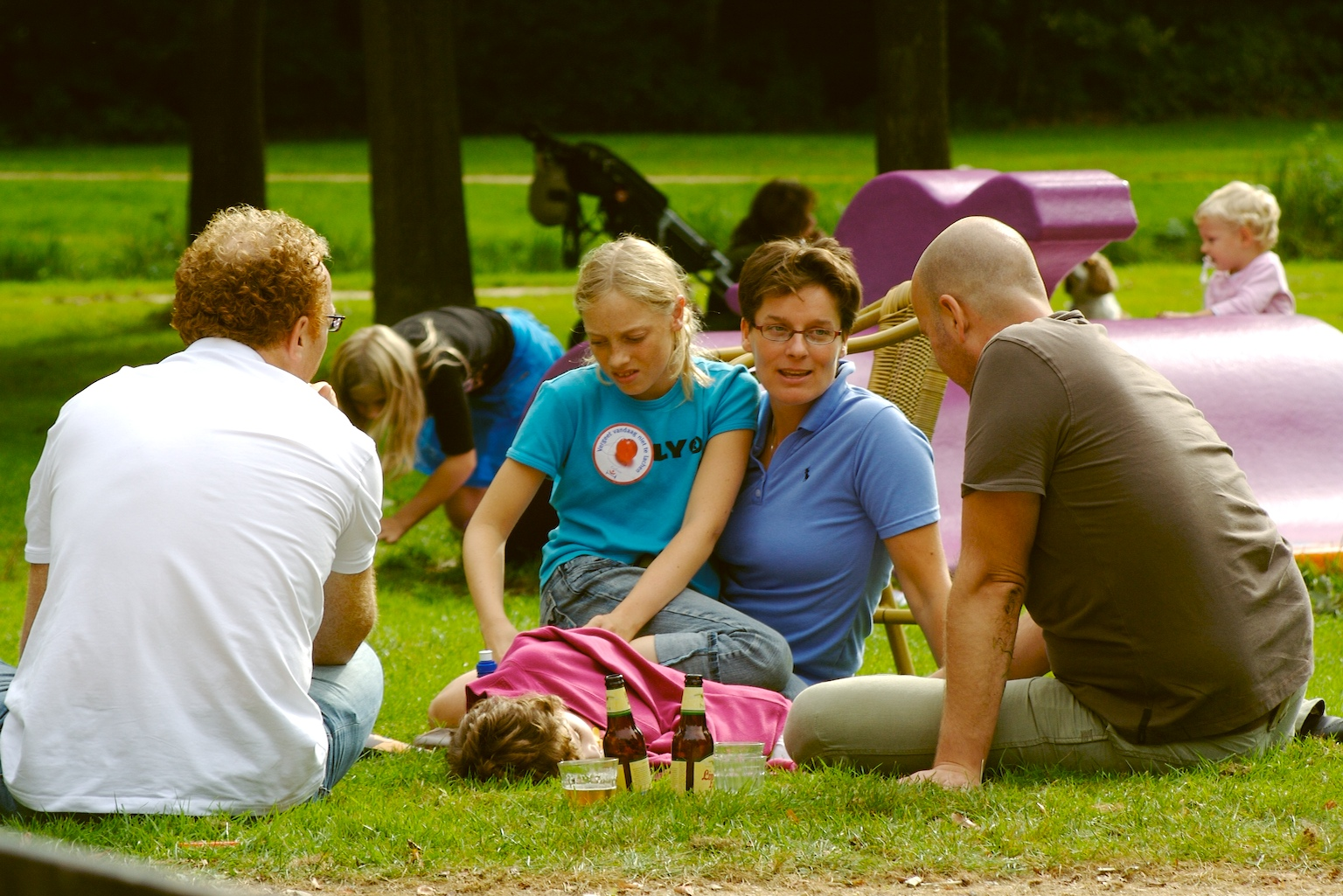

There are various reasons why Australian males have poorer social health outcomes than their female counterparts, from differing attitudes towards general health to approaches of injury and illness. Many things can effect and impact a male's social well-being including employment, education, relationships, addiction and injury. Being unable to read or write can have a huge impact on a male, especially in regard to his ability to gain knowledge in order to be able to make a difference to his own health and those closest to him. Education is shown to increase a person's ability of being able to care for themselves and others. The 2011 Census showed that females have a rate 10% higher than males for completing year 12, with most males entering the work force before completing year 12. An adult male employee working full-time in 2010 earned an average weekly wage of $1342, around $230 more than a female employee and yet men make up 56% of the homeless population and are 12 times more likely to be incarcerated.

== Men's health support ==
There are many health support services available for men to access. Some services include:

- Men's sheds
- Beyondblue
- Lifeline – crises support and suicide prevention
- Headspace – National Youth Mental Health Foundation
- Healthdirect Australia
- 2019 Men's Gathering WA
- Mates in construction – Working to reduce suicide in the Australian construction industry.
- man Healthier directions for males
- MindSpot Clinic

== See also ==
- Men's studies
- Men's Health Forum
- Mental health
- International Men's Health Week
- Global mental health
- Movember
- Elizabeth Celi
