= Tough Guy Book Club =

International men's book club

Tough Guy Book Club (TGBC) is an international single-title book discussion club for men. It was formed in Melbourne, Australia, in 2012 and as of November 2026 there are 159 chapters, including in all Australian states and territories as well as in 10 countries overseas. It operates as a registered not-for-profit charity, and is run by unpaid volunteers.

== Foundation ==
The book club was founded by Shay Leighton in 2012 in a pub in Collingwood, a suburb of Melbourne, in the state of Victoria, Australia. He thought of the idea "to get [himself] out of the house", after hitting a crisis point in his life, having lost partner, business, and friends. Initially it was just Leighton and his friend Tom Scott, with their first book discussion being about the 1952 novella The Old Man and the Sea by Ernest Hemingway. After a large, tattooed, tough-looking man approached them and asked to join, the idea took off after they posted flyers up in tattoo parlours, barbers and boxing gyms.

Leighton chose the name of the club for its incongruity: "every time I said Tough Guy Book Club and someone laughed, I got more and more determined to call it that... Because those two things, toughness and reading, for some reason they've become so separate that, when you push them together, people think you're doing comedy". The name pertains to Leighton's mission, to break down "cultural stereotypes around literacy and masculinity".

In 2015 the book club became a registered not-for-profit charity.

The second chapter was opened in Portland, Oregon, US.

In May 2021, Leighton took part in a panel at the Clunes Booktown festival discussing what works in book clubs.

In 2025 TGBC ran a residential camp which was attended by 185 members. In October 2026, many Australian chapters of the club held parties to listen in to Radio National's countdown of the books voted by listeners as the top 100 Australian books of all time, akin to the Triple J Hottest 100 countdown of music.

== Description ==
The Tough Guy Book Club (TGBC) is registered as an Australian charity in Melbourne. Its purpose is the promotion of both mental and physical health, and (in Australia) it is open to men and all genders over the age of 15. However, its regular meetings are restricted to men. As of 2026 there are 159 chapters across Australia, and 42 overseas, in ten countrie (including New Zealand, the US, and in Europe and Asia), each of which are organised and run locally. They all meet at the same time − 7pm on the first Wednesday of every month, and all meetings are in-person, often at a pub.

In October 2026, its membership comprised men aged from "19 to 97".

In December 2024 the Governor of Victoria, Margaret Gardner, became the patron of the Tough Guy Book Club.

== Impact ==
In 2021, a survey of over 400 book clubs found that only 2.5 per cent were male-only, and they have been described as operating "almost like a men's shed". TGBC is an important meeting point for men in regional communities in Australia, where many other facilities, clubs, and groups have closed or ended. Around 75% of members join to make new friends. In October 2026, there were 60 regional chapters, comprising around 1,200 members.

Founder Leighton has said that while the discussions may appear to be about the books, they can often be a way for men who otherwise struggle to have meaningful conversations to talk about themselves, for example from a starting point of discussing how women or fathers are portrayed in the book.
