= The Men's Table =

Australian men's organization

The Men's Table is an Australian non-profit community organisation that provides opportunities for men to meet and talk about issues in their personal lives, and listen to others, "in a confidential and non-judgemental environment". It is structured around groups of 8-12 men (known as "tables"), who meet once a month for a meal. The tables are largely self-organising, with support from the organisation.

As of May 2024 there were 200 tables with 2,000 men across Australia, in all states and territories, with the first Northern Territory table having been formed in October 2023. New tables are formed when there is sufficient interest in a local area. The table members range in age from 20 to 93, with most being 45–65.

Most tables meet in private rooms at pubs or restaurants, however in September 2023 the first alcohol-free table was formed.

The cost of the meals is paid by those attending. The organisation itself is a registered charity, and is funded by grants from government and philanthropic groups.

As of December 2021, it employed the equivalent of 4.6 full time staff, with plans to expand.

== History ==
The first table was established in Surry Hills, Sydney in June 2011 by Ben Hughes as a peer support group discussing personal issues, after he revealed at a business networking group that he was having problems due to work stress and a divorce. A group of men met once a month for dinner, to discuss "what’s really going on for them". That original table's membership fluctuated, before stabilising with a core group of 12 men; the group (Note: One of the original men died in 2021.) has met each month since then.

They created a set of guidelines based on what had worked for their group, including how they resolved disagreements within the group, and in 2019 Hughes and another member of the original table, David Pointon, formed a non-profit organisation to set up other tables with the same principles.

By the end of 2019, there were 15 tables, comprising 148 members, most in New South Wales, with one table each in Western Australia, Tasmania and New Zealand. By March 2023 there were 100 tables, and the 200th table was formed in June 2024.

In September 2023 the first alcohol-free table was formed, in Western Australia.

Hughes left the organisation in April 2024.

== Fundamental principles ==
The Men's Table operates on several fundamental principles. These were originally created by the members of the first table, so that other tables could learn from their experiences. The structure and details have evolved over time, but common elements include:

- Limited table size (12) with static membership
- Sharing personal feelings and experiences, with table members listening without judging or (unless specifically invited to) offering advice
- An ongoing commitment to meet in-person regularly (Note: During the COVID-19 pandemic, in-person meetings were replaced by online video meetings, with The Men's Table buying a Zoom account. Some tables were initially formed as online groups, only meeting in person after restrictions had been lifted. Since the pandemic, online introductory meetings are still used, in addition to the conventional in-person meals.)
- Equality and independence of tables and members

== See also ==
- Australian Men's Shed Association
