= Elizabeth Celi =

Australian psychologist and author

Elizabeth M. Celi
- Education: Swinburne University of Technology (BAppSc 1996), University of Melbourne (PhD 2011)
- Occupations: Psychologist, therapist
- Known for: Leadership coach, men's mental health psychologist, past media advocate for male victims of intimate partner abuse

Elizabeth M. Celi is an Australian psychologist and author in men's mental health, with understanding in men's mental health and intimate partner abuse. While continuing private practice as a trauma focused therapist, Elizabeth also works as a leadership coach and consultant. She is the sole author of two published books and co-author of six scientific peer reviewed papers.

== Education ==
Celi gained her bachelor's degree in 1996 with first class Honours in 1997 from Swinburne University of Technology, where she majored in psychology and psychophysiology. In 2003, she obtained her Ph.D. from the Department of Psychiatry at The University of Melbourne.

Celi went on to complete studies and obtain qualifications in screenwriting with Screenwriters University 2014–2016, documentary production at the American University of Rome in 2015 and Diploma in Screen and Media (Filmmaking) in 2018 from the New York Film Academy. working as an Assistant Director on-set for 3 years.

== Career ==
Celi was the founding director of Elements Integrated Health Consulting, working as a psychologist and trauma therapist for men, women and all gender orientations. Her experience & public health education in men's mental health and male victims of partner abuse supports men, women and all gender orientations as appropriate to their psychological therapy needs Having managed four private practice consultancies as a psychologist in inner city Melbourne and the Mornington Peninsula, Celi commenced online consults in 2014. Celi now offers Telehealth consultations for mental health concerns and trauma-focused therapy.

Celi is a past member of the board of directors of the Australian Psychological Society. She is an ongoing Member of the Australian Psychological Society, the Trauma Recovery Network Australia, the EMDR Association of Australia (EMDRAA) and the EMDR International Association (EMDRIA). She is an Accredited EMDR Practitioner (EMDRAA) and EMDR Certified Therapist and Consultant-in-Training with EMDRIA.

Celi was a media commentator on men's mental health, interviewed about male victims and female perpetrators of intimate partner abuse and violence by the Brisbane Times, the West Australian, The Herald, The Advertiser, ABC News, and The Sydney Morning Herald. She appeared on 9am with David & Kim for three segments discussing men's mental health matters.

Celi has noted that men express their emotions differently. Gaining understanding of how this shows itself, for both men and women, has been the primary focus of her two published books and media advocacy. Many men and women have shared how they have benefitted in their personal and professional relationships after reviewing Celi's books and media.

During the development of Australia's first National Men's Health Policy, Celi was invited to advise the Senate Select Committee on Men's Health, and subsequently invited to advise the Senate inquiry on domestic violence in 2014.

== Publications ==
=== Books ===
- Elizabeth Celi (2007). Regular Joe vs. Mr. Invincible - The Battle for the True Man. Melbourne: Elizabeth Celi. p. 185. ISBN 9781742982724.
- Elizabeth Celi (2011). Breaking the Silence: A practical guide for male victims of domestic abuse. Melbourne: Elizabeth Celi. p. 320. ISBN 9780980421705.

=== Scientific articles ===
- Lysova, Alexandra; Hanson, Kenzie; Hines, Denise A.; Dixon, Louise; Douglas, Emily M.; Celi, Elizabeth M. (2020). "A Qualitative Study of the Male Victims' Experiences with the Criminal Justice Response to Intimate Partner Abuse in Four English-Speaking Countries". Criminal Justice and Behavior. 47 (10): 1264–1281. doi:10.1177/0093854820927442. S2CID 219901401.
- Dixon, Louise; Treharne, Gareth J.; Celi, Elizabeth M.; Hines, Denise A.; Lysova, Alexandra V.; Douglas, Emily M. (2022). "Examining Men's Experiences of Abuse from a Female Intimate Partner in Four English-Speaking Countries". Journal of Interpersonal Violence. 37 (3–4): 1311–1337. doi:10.1177/0886260520922342. PMID 32468917. S2CID 218985493.
- Lysova, Alexandra; Hanson, Kenzie; Dixon, Louise; Douglas, Emily M.; Hines, Denise A.; Celi, Elizabeth M. (2022). "Internal and External Barriers to Help Seeking: Voices of Men Who Experienced Abuse in the Intimate Relationships". International Journal of Offender Therapy and Comparative Criminology. 66 (5): 538–559. doi:10.1177/0306624X20919710. PMID 32463322. S2CID 218975606.
- Douglas, Emily M.; Hines, Denise A.; Dixon, Louise; Celi, Elizabeth M.; Lysova, Alexandra V. (2021). "Using Technology to Conduct Focus Groups with a Hard-to-Reach Population: A Methodological Approach Concerning Male Victims of Partner Abuse in Four English-Speaking Countries". Journal of Interpersonal Violence. 36 (9–10): NP5257–NP5280. doi:10.1177/0886260518799459. PMID 30226079. S2CID 52284845.
- Ng, Chee H.; Tam, Mei M.; Celi, Elizabeth; Tate, Bruce; Schweitzer, Isaac (2002). "Prospective study of depressive symptoms and quality of life in acne vulgaris patients treated with isotretinoin compared to antibiotic and topical therapy". Australasian Journal of Dermatology. 43 (4): 262–268. doi:10.1046/j.1440-0960.2002.00612.x. PMID 12423432. S2CID 26104999.
- Ng, Chee; Schweitzer, Isaac; Alexopoulos, Paula; Celi, Elizabeth; Wong, Lisa; Tuckwell, Virginia; Sergejew, Alex; Tiller, John (2000). "Efficacy and Cognitive Effects of Right Unilateral Electroconvulsive Therapy". The Journal of ECT. 16 (4): 370–379. doi:10.1097/00124509-200012000-00007. PMID 11314875. S2CID 2419153.

== See also ==
- Men's health
- Men's health in Australia
