= Janette Howard =

Wife of former Australian Prime Minister

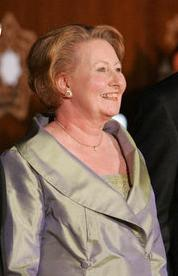
- Howard at APEC Australia 2007

Spouse of the Prime Minister of Australia
- In role 11 March 1996 – 3 December 2007
- Preceded by: Annita Keating
- Succeeded by: Thérèse Rein

Personal details
- Born: Alison Janette Parker; 11 August 1944 (age 82) Kingsford, New South Wales, Australia
- Party: Liberal
- Spouse: John Howard (m. 1971)
- Children: 3
- Education: University of New South Wales; University of Sydney
- Occupation: Teacher

Janette Howard (née Parker; born 11 August 1944) is the wife of John Howard, who was the 25th prime minister of Australia from 11 March 1996 to 3 December 2007.

== Early life, education, and personal life ==
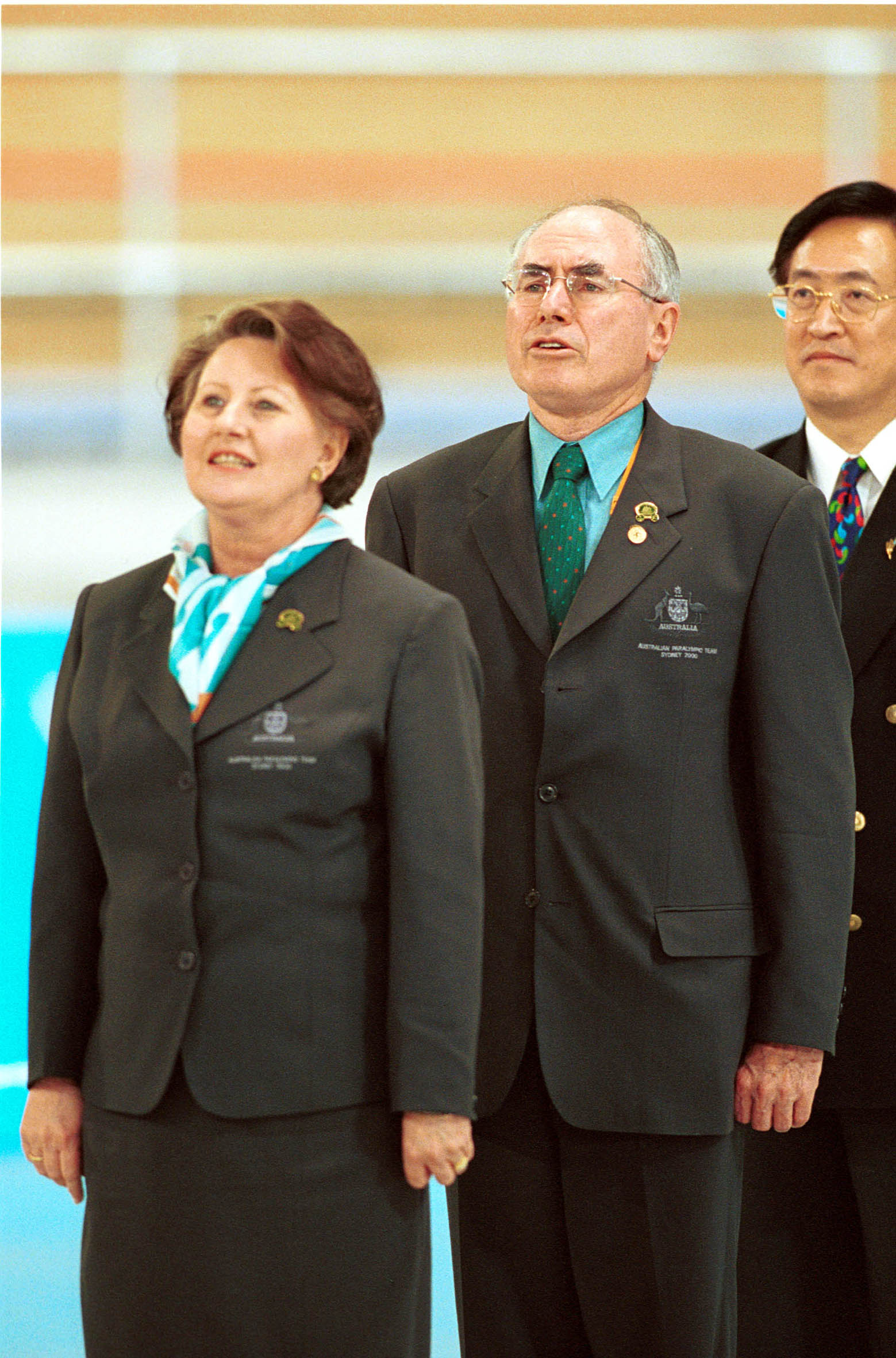
Janette Howard with her husband John Howard in the Australian Team uniform during the 2000 Summer Paralympics. The Howards attended several days of competition during the Games.

Alison Janette Parker was born in the suburb of Kingsford, Sydney, in 1944. Her father was an engineer with the New South Wales Government Railways. The family later moved to Vaucluse. She was educated at Sydney Girls High School and trained as a teacher, graduating from the University of New South Wales with a Bachelor of Arts.

She joined the Liberal Party and met John Howard at a Liberal Party function. They were married on 4 April 1971, at St Peter's Anglican Church in Watsons Bay.

The Howards have three children, Melanie (born 1974, married Rowan McDonald in 2003), Timothy (married Sarah Mackintosh in 2010) and Richard (married Ellen Dadanina in 2017); as well as five grandchildren, Angus (born 2007), Alexander (born 2012), and Ariah (born 2015), Winston (born 2018) and Henry (born 2020).

Janette Howard adopted a relatively low profile during her husband's tenure as prime minister; however, in 1999, a journalist alleged that she had intervened with the Prime Minister concerning an appointment to the board of the Australian Broadcasting Corporation. Janette issued a rare public statement denying the allegation as "not only wrong but deeply offensive to me".

In 1996, Janette Howard was diagnosed with cervical cancer and underwent surgery; the type of cancer was not revealed to the public until 2006. John Howard said at the time that he would leave politics immediately if it seemed necessary in the interests of his wife's health. Since then, Janette has been active in advocating early screening for breast cancer for Australian women.

Janette Howard's public duties included accompanying the Prime Minister on official tours and carrying out the duties of official host at the Prime Minister's official residences, The Lodge in Canberra and Kirribilli House in Sydney. She is also a patron of the National Portrait Gallery.

== Political views ==
Janette Howard was always seen at the Prime Minister's side during election campaigns. According to John Howard's biographer Pru Goward, Janette "lives and breathes" politics. She also devoted time to "nursing" John Howard's electorate of Bennelong, which, although a Liberal seat since its creation in 1949, gradually became less Liberal and culminated in the defeat of John Howard at the 2007 election by the Labor Party's Maxine McKew (the seat returned to Liberal hands at the 2010 election when McKew was defeated by John Alexander).

Although she rarely made any public comment on political issues, she did break this pattern by deciding to speak out against Kevin Rudd during the 2007 election campaign.

Honorary titles
Preceded by Annita van Iersel	Spouse of the Prime Minister of Australia; 1996 –2007	Succeeded by Thérèse Rein
