= Thérèse Rein =

Australian entrepreneur

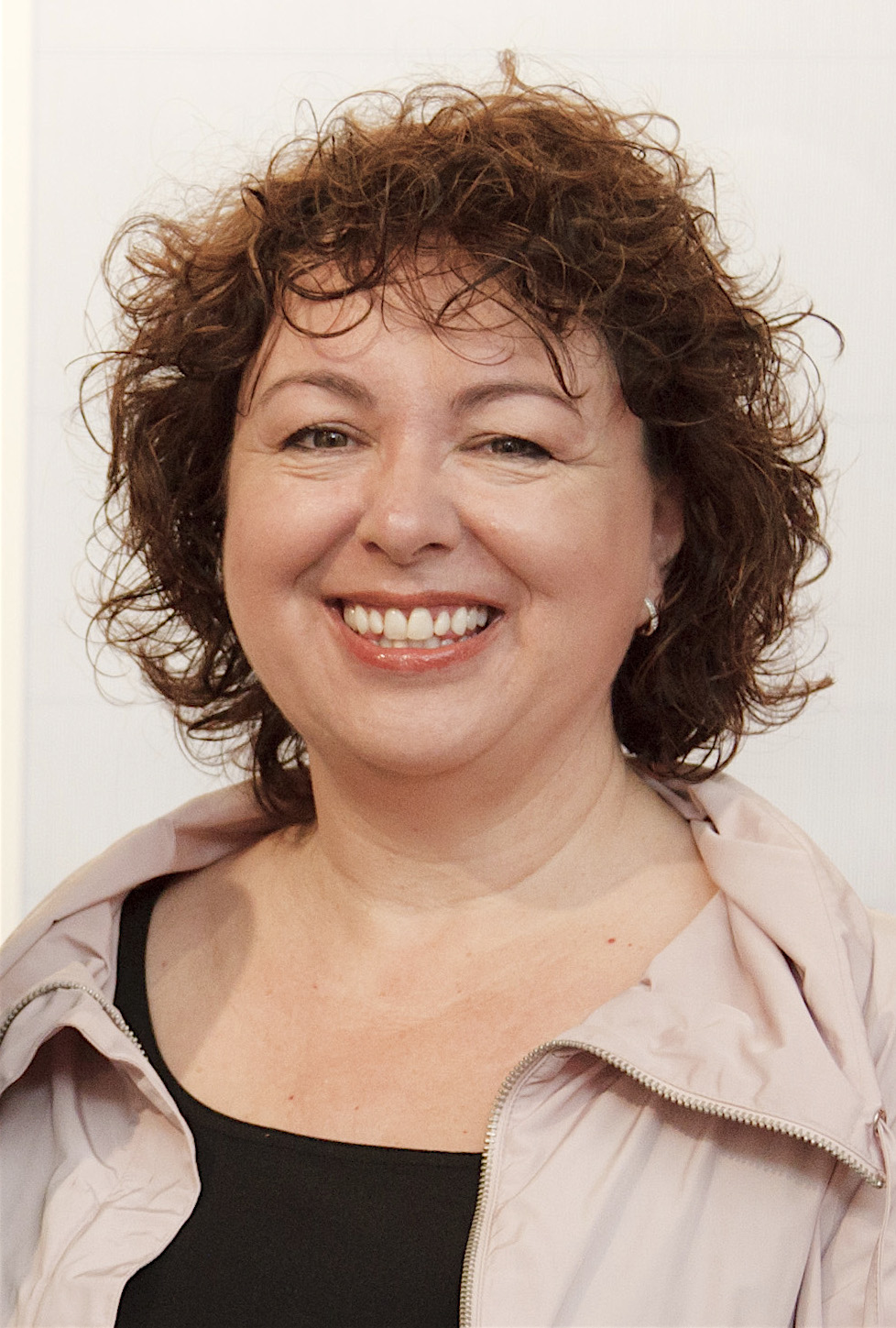
- Rein in 2011

Spouse of the Prime Minister of Australia
- In role 27 June 2013 – 18 September 2013
- Preceded by: Tim Mathieson
- Succeeded by: Margie Abbott
- In role 3 December 2007 – 24 June 2010
- Preceded by: Janette Howard
- Succeeded by: Tim Mathieson

Personal details
- Born: 17 July 1958 (age 68) Adelaide, South Australia, Australia
- Spouse: Kevin Rudd (m. 1981)
- Children: 3
- Education: Australian National University
- Occupation: Social entrepreneur, Rehabilitation counsellor

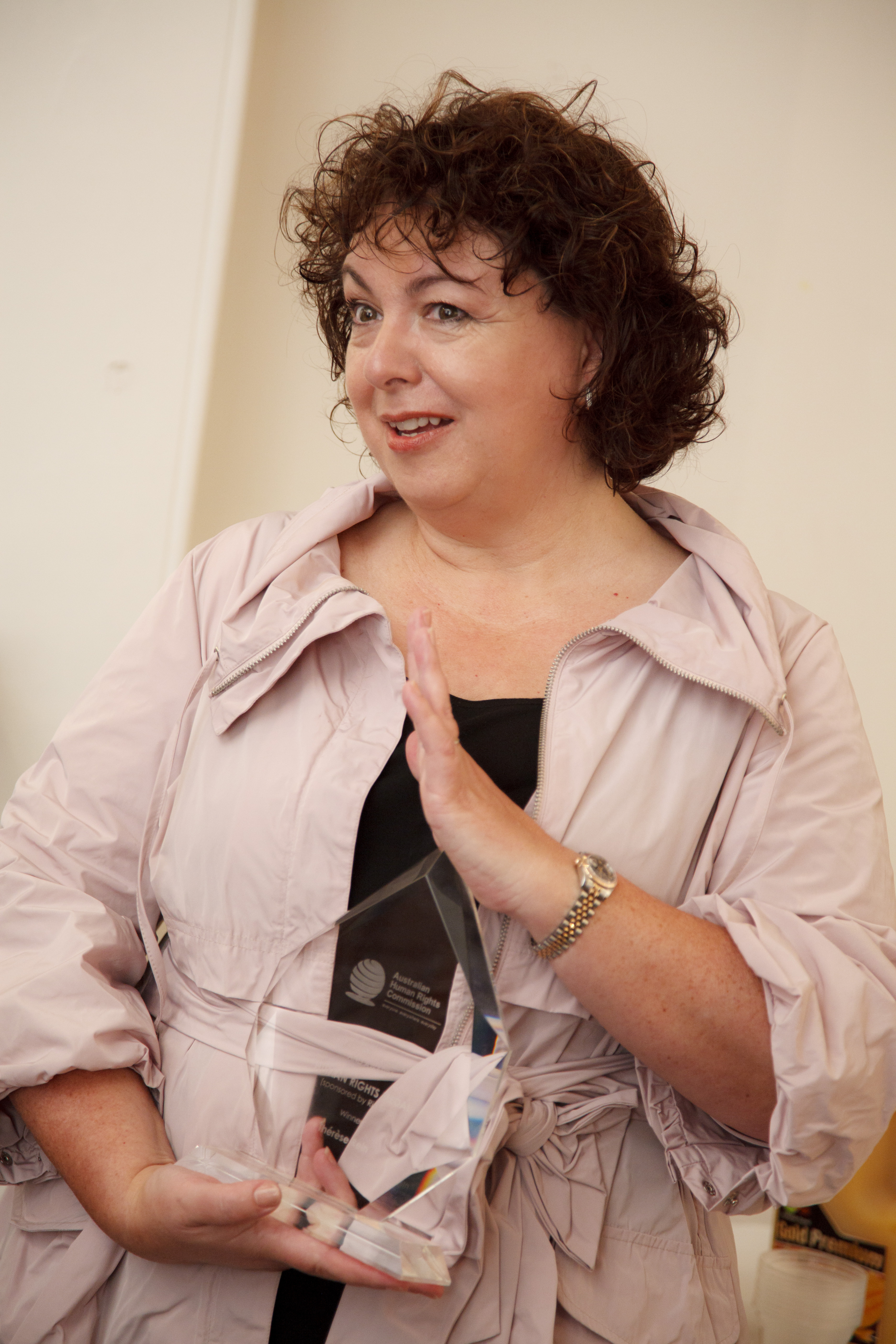
Rein receiving the 2010 Human Rights Medal.

Thérèse Virginia Rein /təˈreɪz ˈreɪn/ (born 17 July 1958) is an Australian entrepreneur who is the founder of Ingeus, an international employment and business psychology services company.

Rein is married to Kevin Rudd, who was the 26th prime minister of Australia, holding the office from 2007 to 2010 and then again in 2013. She was the first Australian prime minister's wife to remain in the paid workforce while her husband was in office. She was awarded the Human Rights Medal by the Australian Human Rights Commission in December 2010 for her long-term dedication to human rights, especially the rights of people with disability. This was a point of contention as Rein's husband was prime minister during the period of the award's consideration; she was, however, awarded the medal following her husband's deposal.

In December 2012, she was awarded an Honorary Doctor of the University degree by Griffith University for her services to business, and the award of Doctor of Letters (honoris causa) by the University of Western Sydney in April 2014, in recognition of her service to the Australian community, commitment to human rights, engaging constructively with human rights mechanisms, eliminating poverty and injustice, and the illumination of disadvantage. In 2018, she was inducted into the Queensland Business Leaders Hall of Fame.

== Early life ==
Rein was born on 17 July 1958 in Adelaide, South Australia. Her father, John Rein, was a Royal Australian Air Force navigator who had suffered severe spinal cord damage during a plane crash. He later became an aeronautical engineer and represented Australia at the 1957 Stoke Mandeville Games as a member of Australia's first ever international disability sports team, and the 1962 Perth Commonwealth Paraplegic Games, where he won gold medals in the Columbia Round of Archery and the Dartchery teams event. His achievements played a pivotal role in inspiring his daughter. He met his future wife Elizabeth at a rehabilitation hospital in Sydney where she was working as the head of physiotherapy.

Rein attended St Peter's Collegiate Girls' School in Adelaide and Firbank Grammar School in Melbourne. She studied psychology, linguistics and English at the Australian National University in Canberra and received a Bachelor of Arts with honours in psychology in 1980, and a Master of Psychology (Qualifying) degree in 1981. There she met Kevin Rudd, as both of them lived at Burgmann College during their first year of university and were members of the Student Christian Movement. The pair married in 1981 soon after graduation, before moving offshore for envoy-in-training Rudd to study diplomacy in Sweden and China. In 1986, they returned to Australia, where Rein set up the company Work Directions, now named Ingeus, to help people injured at work find employment. They have three children: Jessica (born 1983), Nicholas (born 1986) and Marcus (born 1993).

== Business career ==
In 1986, she worked part-time as a rehabilitation counsellor, primarily helping people get back into the workforce. In 1988, she founded Thérèse Rein and Associates, later Ingeus. This international employment services agency assists jobseekers, in particular long-term unemployed people, enter the workforce.

The chairman of Ingeus is David Gonski AC, a prominent business leader based in Sydney. Other directors include Rein, Garry Hounsell and Greg Ashmead.

The sale of the Australian arm of Ingeus took place in May 2007 to ensure there was no perceived conflict of interest as her husband, Kevin Rudd was the Leader of the Opposition (and later the Prime Minister of Australia). The Australian businesses sold in October and December 2007.

Ingeus re-entered the Australian market with the acquisition of Assure Programs in October 2011.

== UK government contract ==
In 2011, Ingeus UK was awarded 23 percent of the Work Programme contract by the UK Government. Some speculation has ensued regarding funds purported to have been given in support to the employment minister, Chris Grayling. The DWP responded in a statement said that Grayling was not personally involved in the decision to award the Work Programme contract to Ingeus UK:

All commercial decisions were made through a clear governance process and the evaluation was conducted in accordance with our disclosed process. Our processes are in accordance with best practice across public sector procurement ... The procurement was undertaken by qualified (CIPS) and experienced procurement professionals. There was extensive internal and external assurance exercises undertaken throughout the procurement process.

== Philanthropy ==
Rein has a strong involvement in charity work and is patron of the Australian Common Ground Alliance; UNICEF Maternal and Infant Health Campaign; the Indigenous Literacy Foundation; OzHarvest Food rescue; Ability First Australia; Arts Project Australia; The Bella Program at the Museum of Contemporary Art, Sydney; ACT Junior Talent Squad for Athletes with a Disability; Shakespeare on Oxford Festival at Bulimba, Brisbane. She is a member of the Honorary Board of the International Paralympic Committee.

Honorary titles
Preceded by Janette Howard	Spouse of the Prime Minister of Australia; 2007–2010	Succeeded by Tim Mathieson
Preceded by Tim Mathieson	Spouse of the Prime Minister of Australia; 2013	Succeeded by Margie Abbott
