= MindSpot Clinic =

- Formation: December 2012
- Headquarters: Sydney, Australia
- Region served: Australia
- Services: Screening assessments and treatment courses for people troubled by anxiety and depression
- Director: Professor Nick Titov
- Chair: Professor S. Bruce Dowton, Vice Chancellor of Macquarie University
- Parent organization: MQ Health Pty Ltd
- Website: http://www.mindspot.org.au

MindSpot Clinic (MindSpot) is Australia's first free national online mental health clinic which launched in December 2012. It provides screening assessments and internet-delivered cognitive behavioural therapy (ICBT) courses for Australians troubled by stress, worry, anxiety and depression.

== History ==
The MindSpot Clinic project was developed by a team of mental health professionals, led by researchers from Macquarie University, in partnership with the Australian Federal Government. The project was one of the main components of the Australian Government’s e-Mental Health Strategy for Australia, 2012.

From 2012 to 2019, MindSpot was operated and managed by Access Macquarie Limited, the commercial arm of Macquarie University. In 2019, MindSpot became a part of Macquarie University’s clinical enterprise – MQ Health Pty Ltd.

== Services ==
MindSpot’s remit is to improve access to mental health services, improve public awareness of how to access services and provide evidence-based treatments.

MindSpot offers two services – screening assessments and treatment courses – to help people learn about and manage stress, anxiety, low mood, depression, obsessive-compulsive disorder, post-traumatic stress disorder and chronic pain. The clinical team includes psychiatrists, psychologists, Indigenous mental health workers and counsellors.

=== Accessibility ===
MindSpot services are used by large numbers of people who do not access traditional mental health care including: Aboriginal and Torres Strait Islander people; people faced by barriers to care such as lack of local services, geographical distance, or stigma; and those who live outside major cities.

By the end of 2018, the total number of individual people to whom a clinical service was provided was 100,875.

=== Assessment ===
Map of Australia showing postcodes of people who began a MindSpot screening assessment in 2016–17

The MindSpot screening assessment requires respondents to answer demographic and clinical questions. Assessment outcomes are measured using the Patient Health Questionnaire 9 (PHQ-9), Generalized Anxiety Disorder 7 (GAD-7) and Kessler 10 Psychological Distress scale (K-10). People who complete the assessment are invited to discuss their results and provide additional details to a therapist by telephone in order to tailor treatment advice.

By the end of 2018, more than 95,000 Australians had completed a MindSpot assessment.

=== Treatment ===
Access to MindSpot’s treatment courses is dependent on the initial screening assessment. People in need of immediate care or who are deemed "too unwell" are typically not admitted and are referred to face-to-face services.

MindSpot provides seven highly structured and systematically released online treatment courses for adults troubled by symptoms of stress, worry, anxiety, low mood and depression:

• Wellbeing Course for adults aged 26–65 years

• Wellbeing Plus Course for older adults aged 65 years and over

• Indigenous Wellbeing Course for Aboriginal and Torres Strait Islanders aged 18 years and over

• Mood Mechanic Course for young adults aged 18–25 years

• OCD Course for adults aged 18 years and over with obsessive compulsive disorder

• PTSD Course for adults aged 18 years and over with post-traumatic stress disorder

• Pain Course for adults aged 18 years and over with chronic pain

By the end of 2018, 19,405 Australians had opted for treatment.

== Treatment outcomes ==
The ICBT treatment courses used at MindSpot were developed and validated in a series of randomised controlled trials at the Macquarie University online research clinic, the eCentreClinic.

According to the study published in Psychiatry Online in October 2015, MindSpot treatment outcomes are "comparable to results from published clinical trials of ICBT" and this model represents a method of providing accessible mental health services to many people who currently are not receiving care. At posttreatment and three months posttreatment, reliable recovery from anxiety and depression ranged from 46.7% to 51.1%, and deterioration ranged from 1.9% to 3.8%. The clinical outcomes on the K-10, PHQ-9 and GAD-7 are consistent with those observed in Australian benchmarking studies. The magnitude of treatment benefits at MindSpot are comparable with those reported in the English Improving Access to Psychological Therapies (IAPT) programme and in benchmarking studies of face-to-face therapy.

== International Use ==
MindSpot treatment courses have been adopted and shown to work in several other countries, including Canada and Ireland.

== Awards ==
• 2015 Mental Health Matters Award (Excellence in Service Delivery) for assisting more than 40,000 Australians troubled by symptoms of anxiety and depression

• 2015 Queensland Mental Health Week Achievement Award (Not-for-profit – small)

• 2013 Macquarie University Excellence in External Research Partnership and Commercialisation of Research IP
