= Annita van Iersel =

Dutch-born Australian artist

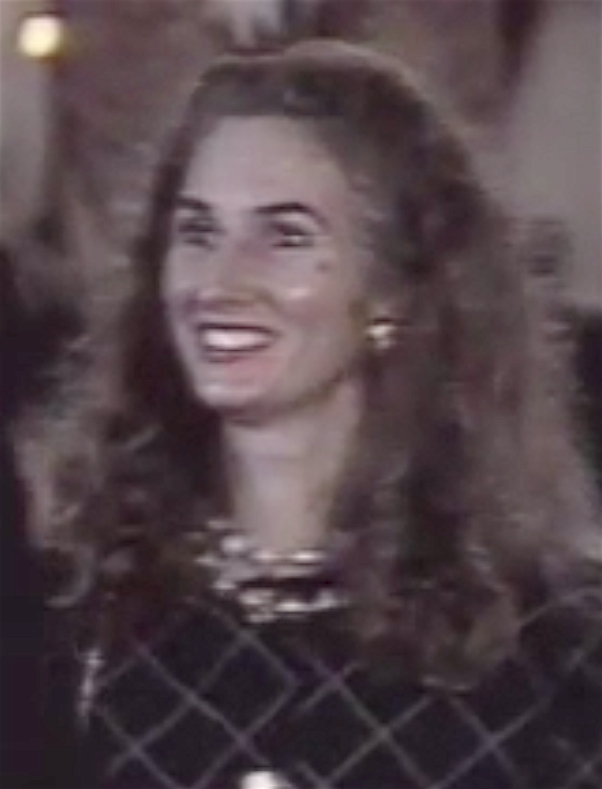
- van Iersel in 1992

Spouse of the Prime Minister of Australia
- In role 20 December 1991 – 11 March 1996
- Preceded by: Hazel Hawke
- Succeeded by: Janette Howard

Personal details
- Born: Anna Johanna Maria van Iersel; 5 October 1948 (age 78) Oisterwijk, North Brabant, Netherlands
- Spouse: Paul Keating (m. 1975; div. 2008)
- Children: 4
- Education: Australian National School of Arts
- Occupation: artist

Anna Johanna Maria "Annita" van Iersel (born 5 October 1948), known as Annita Keating from 1975 to 1998, is a Dutch-born Australian artist and former wife of Paul Keating, the 24th prime minister of Australia.

== Early life and education ==
Anna Johanna Maria van Iersel, known as Annita, was born on 5 October 1948 in the Netherlands. Her home town in the Netherlands was Oisterwijk, North Brabant.

== Career ==
Van Iersel worked as a flight attendant for Alitalia.

=== As wife to Paul Keating ===
While working with Alitalia, Van Iersel met Paul Keating, then an aspiring young politician. They married on 17 January 1975, in her home town of Oisterwijk, Netherlands.

While her husband was Prime Minister of Australia (from 1991 to 1996), their four children spent part of their teenage years at The Lodge, the prime minister's official residence in Canberra. Annita was well travelled, and this, along with her knowledge of five languages, proved a valuable diplomatic asset, especially in support of Sydney's bid for the Sydney 2000 Olympic Games.

In 1998, Van Iersel and Keating separated. They did not formally divorce until 2008, though she had resumed her maiden name of Van Iersel long before then. Annita revealed some years after the event, in an interview with her by The Bulletin, that Keating had broken off the relationship, not she, and had done it at a dinner party with friends.

=== Art career ===
Van Iersel studied at the National Art School in Darlinghurst, Sydney, graduating in 2002. In 2008 she was studying for a master's degree and went to Beijing as an exchange student at a major art college there.

She is known for her photographic works.

She was scheduled to exhibit a series of paintings – oils on Belgian linen – that she created in her studio on the Hawkesbury River, in the Palm House in the Royal Botanic Garden in Sydney in August 2008, titled Reflections. (Note: No record of this exhibition appears to exist online. Note that the DACC article is not reliable as it cites Wikipedia.)

== Other activities ==
Van Iersel travelled for three months in Central America after her separation from Keating in 1998.

On 19 March 2008, she opened a touring exhibition Mrs Prime Minister — Public Image, Private Lives at Old Parliament House in Canberra. The exhibition featured herself, along with five other women who had recently been wives of Australian prime ministers: Janette Howard, Hazel Hawke, Tamie Fraser, Margaret Whitlam, and Sonia McMahon.

== Footnotes ==
Honorary titles
Preceded by Hazel Hawke	Spouse of the Prime Minister of Australia; 20 December 1991 – 11 March 1996	Succeeded by Janette Howard
