= Men's shed =

Non-profit local organisations that provide a space for craftwork and social interaction

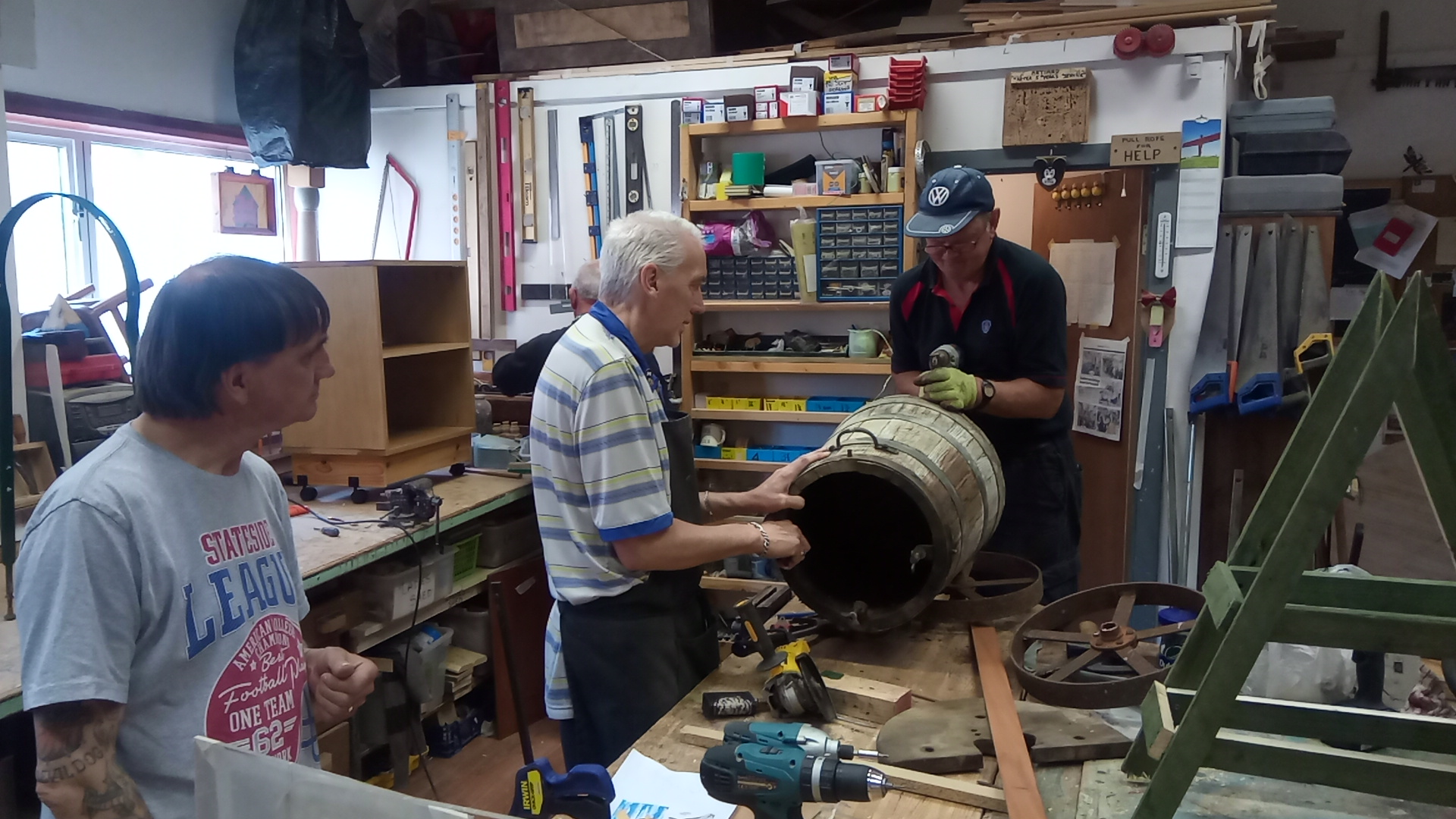
The Men's Shed in Jedburgh

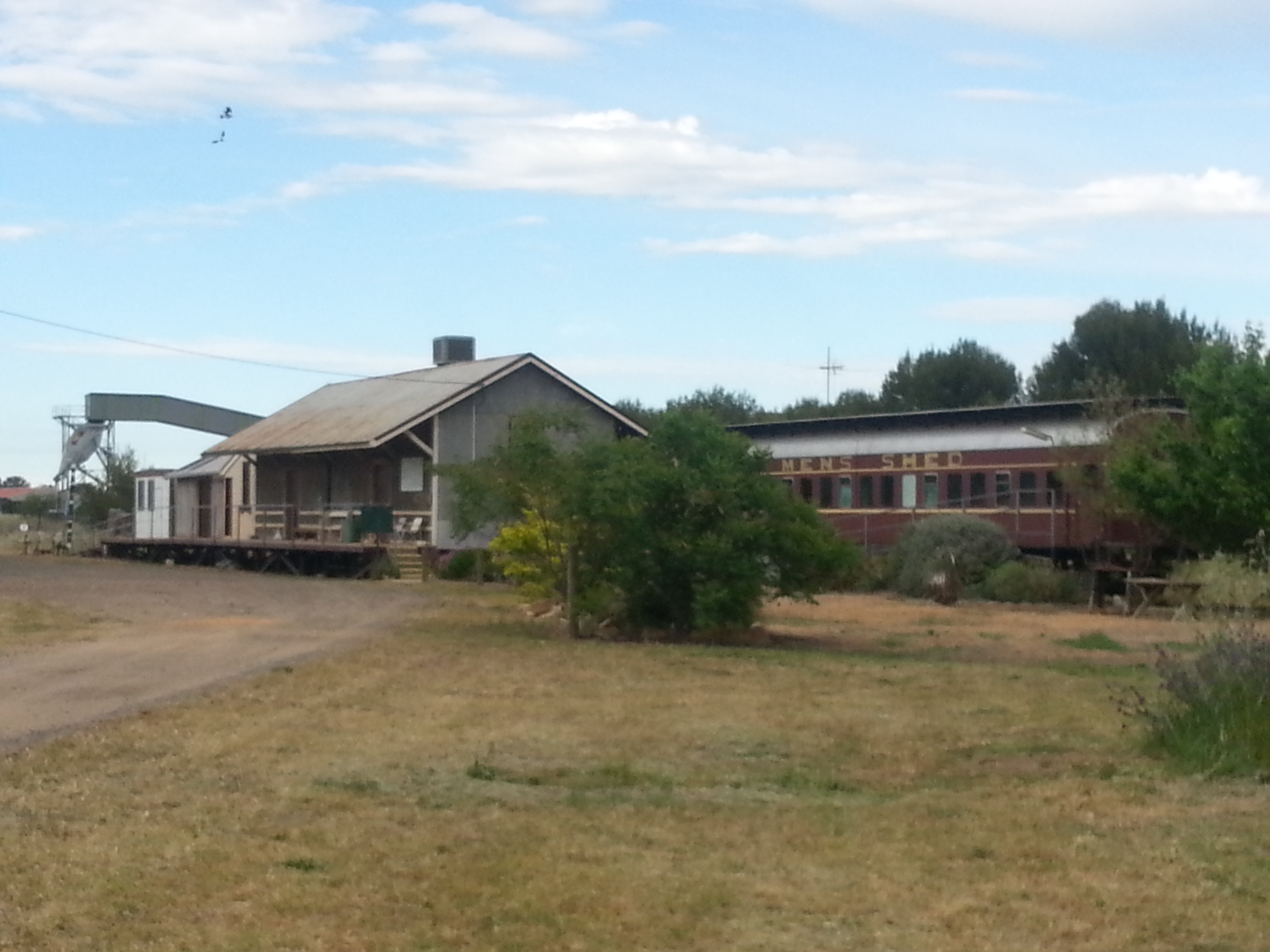
An old railway goods shed in Australia, now the Grenfell Men's Shed

Men's sheds or community sheds are non-profit local organisations that provide a space for craftwork and social interaction. The movement originated in Australia around the 1980s as a way to improve the health and wellbeing of older men. However some have expanded their remit to anyone regardless of age or gender, and have similar aims and functions to hackerspaces. There are over 900 located across Australia, with thousands of active members. Men's sheds can also be found in the United Kingdom, Ireland, United States, Canada, Finland, Estonia, New Zealand and Greece.

The slogan for men's sheds is "Shoulder To Shoulder", shortened from "Men don't talk face to face, they talk shoulder to shoulder", adopted after the 2008 Australian Men's Shed Association (AMSA) conference. The users of men's sheds are known as "shedders". In 2014, Professor Barry Golding coined the term "shedagogy" to describe "a distinctive, new way of acknowledging, describing and addressing the way some men prefer to learn informally in shed-like spaces mainly with other men." Sheds as a venue for mentoring other men and Inter-generational mentoring is a growing outcome. Academics are using men's sheds as a research venue and research partner in exploring men's health and social needs.

== History ==
The men's shed movement originated in Australia. One of the precursors of the movement began in the 1980s in Broken Hill, New South Wales, involving former miners. Another was the Albury Manual Activities Centre, also known as "Albury Men's Shed" which opened in 1978. Work in Adelaide, South Australia focused upon the gender biased and inappropriate care of older men living with dementia in care settings and work with Vietnam Veterans in South Australia also played its part.

Professor Barry Golding has researched the origins of the men's shed, and states "Maxine Chaseling was the key person behind 'The Shed' back in the early nineties and spoke of the stories behind the development of the Shed." The first shed for men, was founded by Chaseling (formerly Maxine Kitto) in 1993. It was located in Goolwa, South Australia as part of The Heritage Club, an activities/day centre for the older generations/elderly, where she was employed as the coordinator. The shed was opened on 3 March 1993 by the Hon Dean Brown AO, Member for Alexandra, later to become Premier of South Australia.

Chaseling had worked in aged services for many years, and had spoken at many conferences in the late 1980s and 1990s about gerontology, men's health and the lack of services for men. She originally came up with the idea of a men's shed after her own father had become depressed and felt stuck at home after having a heart attack and not being able to work anymore. She noticed that the only thing that seemed to give her father purpose was to work in his shed. Having also noticed that the men at the Heritage Club seemed lost and not interested in the activities that the ladies were involved in, Chaseling thought she would create a men's shed at the Heritage Club to give the men a focus point for purpose, for mentoring younger generations, socialising, and ultimately to create better mental health outcomes. It worked, and the men's mental health levels improved, along with their levels of happiness. At this point, the program was known as The Shed.

The Australian Men's Shed Association quotes Chaseling, as she talks about her role in starting the first shed: "I struck the match but fortunately it was the right time and the primary health strategy was simple and doable in any community".

After Chaseling had created the first men's shed, she spoke at conferences in the 1990s about how the men's shed was filling a gap in men's services. It is from this point that the men's shed movement started to grow, with the next shed located in nearby Langhorne Creek, South Australia.

The first national health conference dedicated to men in Australia took place in 1995.

The first men's shed (by that name) was opened in Tongala, Victoria, Australia on 26 July 1998. Named after its founder, Dick McGowan, the shed predates the Lane Cove Community Shed in New South Wales by just a few months, though both likely originated from ideas discussed at the National Rural Health Conference in 1995. Lane Cove Community Shed was opened in December 1998. As well as being a place for craftwork and socialisation, it also provided vital health information to its members.

These communal sheds were inspired by backyard sheds, where a man would go and carry out tasks such as restoring furniture or fixing lawn mowers. Men's sheds can also be seen as an extension of the original nineteenth century idea of working men's clubs in the UK and Australia: "to provide recreation and education for working-class men and their families". In time working men's clubs increasingly focused on charitable work and recreational activities typically associated with pubs. Whilst acting as hubs for information exchange, the community educational aspects foundered, as men's sheds remained in people's homes typically at the bottom of the garden.

Mensheds Australia was established in 2002 by Peter Sergeant and Ron Fox. It became clear an overarching infrastructure was needed to support men in establishing and managing their men's sheds in regional, rural and remote areas. It involved documenting practical information and knowledge, tools, checklists, processes and training materials while utilising modern technology. Much work was undertaken in establishing men's sheds in some of the remotest parts of Australia and in Indigenous communities. The Australian Men's Shed Association was established in 2007 by the Australian independent community-based men's sheds to represent, support and promote the men's shed movement and to act as a central hub for information exchange. The Australian Men's Shed Association is funded by the federal government to provide initial and ongoing practical support for the development of all men's sheds.

The Irish Men's Sheds Association was established in 2011 and was the first shed association to be founded in the Northern Hemisphere. The member Sheds of the Irish Association are from both Northern Ireland and the Republic of Ireland. One notable difference between the men's sheds in Australia and Ireland is the age demographic of the participating men; in Ireland men of all ages participate while in Australia it is mostly retired men. In February 2013 Westhill & Districts Men's Shed opened its doors as a constituted charity, to be the first men's shed following the Australian model in Scotland. The UK Men's Shed Association was established in 2013. The Scottish Men's Sheds Association was established in 2015.

By 2015, men's sheds were also active in a number of other countries, mainly based throughout Europe and South Asia. This included over one hundred men's sheds in New Zealand and over two hundred in Ireland. By 2023, there were over 900 men's sheds across the UK. The United States has set up a national association, the US Men's Sheds Association, and had three sheds in Hawaii, Minnesota and Michigan by May 2017. In 2022, the Men's Sheds Canada association was formally created.

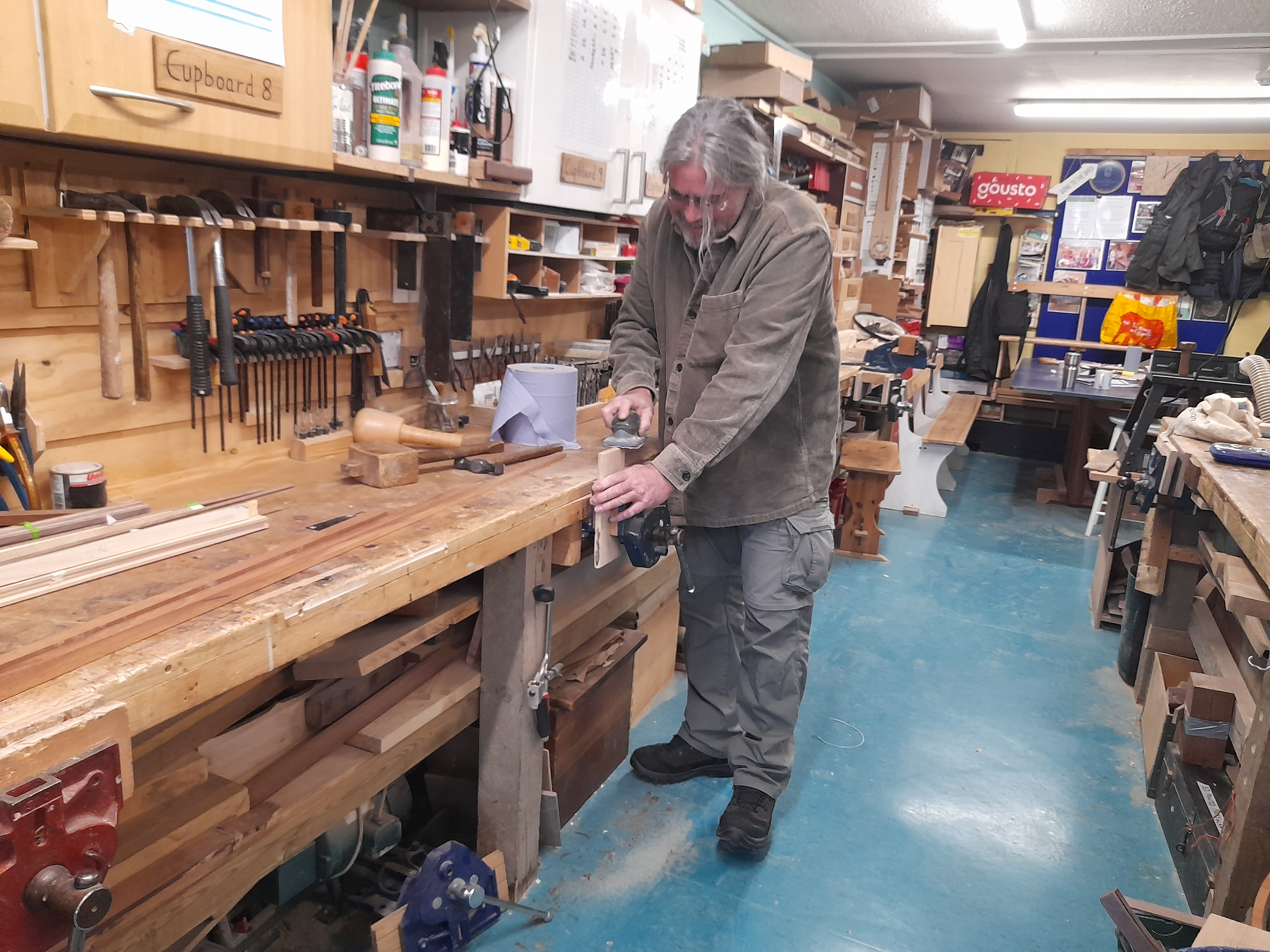
Man works on his project at Camden Town Shed

== Categories ==
Sheds can have their own unique aims and focus on a certain subject. Men's sheds can be defined into five main categories. These categories are work, clinical, educational, recreational and communal.

Work sheds are for those who want to remain active and have an overall goal. These sheds focus heavily on restoration and construction, while helping the local community. Clinical and communal have similar features, with the core of their aims focused on helping the local male community interact and discuss their health and wellbeing. Recreational men's sheds are created to help promote more social activity in the local area.

Educational sheds are aimed at improving skills and qualities.

Virtual sheds provide an online capability where members from all men's sheds and other remote communities across the country or around the world can actively communicate and be involved in numerous research, writing and photographic activities. The International Historians Association has created a community shed for veteran responders which include police officers, firefighters, paramedics, rescue workers and the military who have injuries, incapacities or disfigurements that make them immobile or unwilling to join local work sheds.

== Health and wellbeing ==
One of the main reasons for the creation of men's sheds was to improve the overall health of the older male population of Australia. "Men's sheds have been described as a male-friendly service providing a 'health by stealth' approach". Research acknowledges the positive role that sheds can have in "addressing the gendered health disparity that males face".

Barry Golding argues that men sheds help address imbalances in healthcare outcomes that affect men. Men have worse health outcomes across all age groups than females in most Western countries. Concern has been expressed that a lack of support for older men and associated lack of visibility hampers progress due to limited research. Longitudinal studies of men's sheds and their impact are missing. Sheds can also help counter negative cultural, social and ideological attitudes towards men.

One area where men's sheds are seen to be making a difference is in the diagnosis and treatment of diabetes. Men are at higher risk of un-diagnosed and un-treated diabetes as well as having higher rates of diabetes. In Ireland the national men's sheds association is working with Diabetes Ireland, health care providers and professionals to address male diabetes. The growing links between men's health and sheds is identified in literature for practitioners.

Men's sheds are also directly involved in supporting men with dementia and Alzheimer's disease, especially in the early stages. Alzheimer's Australia NSW helped develop initiatives through their "Every Bloke Needs a Shed" pilot project.

Research supports the value of men's sheds to the shedders themselves. 2007 research found the following;

- 99.5% of men, "I feel better about myself"
- 97%, "I have a place where I belong"
- 97%, "I can give back to the community"
- 97%, "I am doing what I really enjoy"
- 90%, "I feel more accepted in the community"
- 79%, "I get access to men's health information"
- 77%, "I feel happier at home"

Approximately 30% of shedders are disabled.

The positive aspects of the shed environment are often linked to peer support, learning and how "Each shed participant is both a teacher and a learner ...".

== Support and funding ==
The Australian Government has acknowledged the social importance of men's sheds for a number of years. They have now been actively promoting and funding men's sheds projects. Men's sheds are now part of the local community in many parts of Australia, and are becoming part of its culture. This has led in recent times for them to also be supported regionally and funded by local and regional organisations and councils.

Other countries where men's sheds are becoming popular have also recognized their social & health benefits. Ireland acknowledged and promoted them in their National Men's Health Policy 2008-13.

Men's sheds are funded through a number of specialist charities, private investment and government sources.

== See also ==
- Community centre – Centre for the local community
- Community gardening – Type of horticulture and food production
- Hackerspace – Community organization
- Repair Café – Venues where people gather and repair everyday items
- Third place – Social space other than home or workplace
