= Australian Men's Shed Association =

- Industry: Health & wellbeing
- Founded: 2007
- Headquarters: Australia
- Area served: Australia
- Revenue: 4,274,390 Australian dollar (2023)
- Total assets: 2,629,661 Australian dollar (2023)
- Number of employees: 11 (2023, 2022)
- Website: mensshed.org

The Australian Men's Shed Association (AMSA) is a non-profit organisation that was set up in April 2007 to aid men's sheds across Australia. The purpose of the Association was to offer a central source for all Men's Sheds in the country, due to the number of duplicate men's sheds appearing.

The AMSA represents 900 men's sheds, acting as a central support organization to over 125,000 Australian men.

== History ==
The concept was originally discussed in 2005, before it was formally founded in 2007. The initial aim was to provide central support to the men's sheds across Australia. This would be done through distributing free information, while aiming to develop men's sheds, and their effectiveness. These aims resulted in a common goal, which resulted in minimising the setup and running costs associated with men's sheds.

In 2010 the Federal Government of Australia launched the Men's Health Policy, which identified and recognized the role the AMSA play in men's health throughout Australia. This identification led to them receiving a grant of AU$3 million to help support their foundation. Later that year the organization also became registered as a tax-deductible recipient.

The success of AMSA is now a model, which is being replicated by numerous non-profit organisations worldwide, including Japan, Europe and North America.

== Support ==
The AMSA provide a variety of services aimed at members, such as risk management advice and insurance. The organization also aims to source funding and resources that benefit men's sheds. Every two years the AMSA holds a National Conference, aimed at sharing knowledge and experiences. In 2015 it held its 6th Annual Conference, where different aims and achievements were discussed. The conference in 2015 attracted over 400 delegates and had a number of key speakers involved in health and men's sheds.

The AMSA also provides an online forum for members, along with aids to apply for development grants.
