= Commercial Road (disambiguation) =

Commercial Road is a road in London.

Commercial Road may also refer to:

- Commercial road, Ooty, a roadway in Ooty, Tamil Nadu, India
- Commercial Road Primary School, a primary school in Morwell, Victoria, Australia
- Commercial Road, Melbourne, a roadway in South Yarra, Victoria, Australia
- Commercial Road, Newport, a main road in Newport, Wales
- Commercial Road, Gloucester

== See also ==
- Commercial Road Lock, a lock on the Regent's Canal, in the London Borough of Tower Hamlets
