= 9 and 9A Southgate Street, Gloucester =

9 and 9A Southgate Street
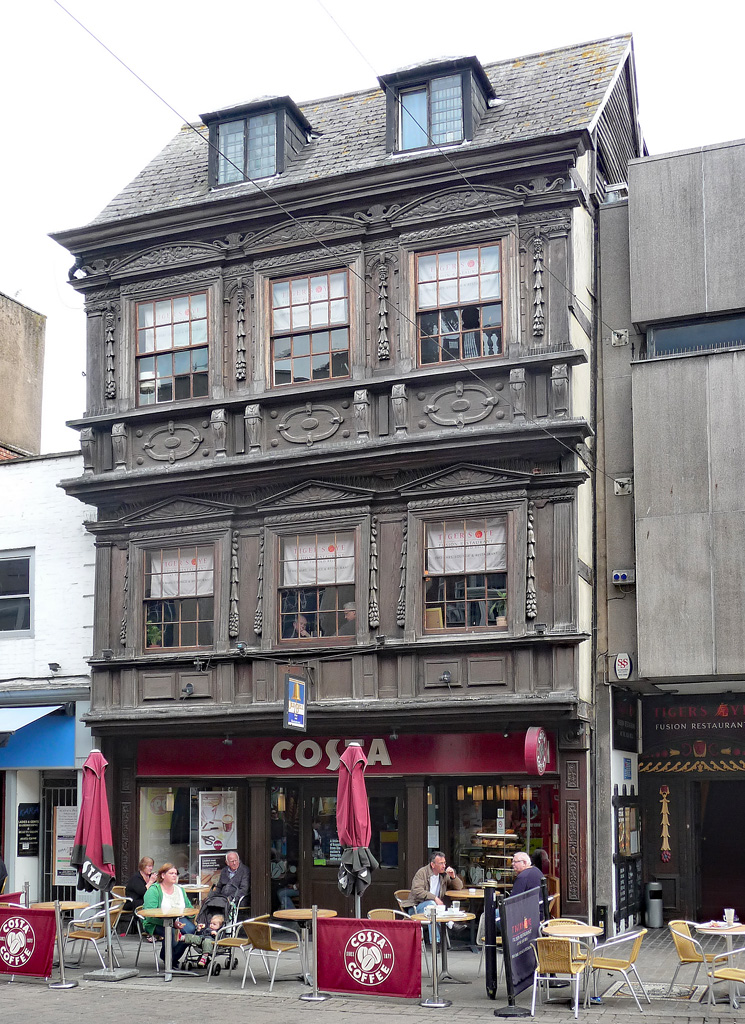

General information
- Type: Merchant's house
- Architectural style: Jacobean architecture
- Location: 9 and 9A Southgate Street, Gloucester, United Kingdom
- Coordinates: 51.8649588°N 2.24616220°W
- Completed: 1665

Technical details
- Material: Brick & timber
- Floor count: 5

Design and construction
- Known for: Being the former Old Bell Inn

Listed Building – Grade I
- Official name: 9 and 9A, Southgate Street
- Designated: 23 January 1952; 74 years ago
- Reference no.: 1271748

9 and 9A Southgate Street is a 17th-century Jacobean timber-framed merchant's house on Southgate Street, Gloucester. It has been a Grade I listed building since 23 January 1952. 9 Southgate Street was most recently occupied by a branch of Costa Coffee and 9A Southgate Street was most recently occupied by The Tiger's Eye restaurant, the former having closed in January 2026 and the latter having closed in August 2024.

== History ==
The actual Bell Inn building itself was actually built for the Mayor of Gloucester at the time, Thomas Yate, in 1664–5 as a merchant's house. Sash windows were added to all of the upper floors in the eighteenth century.

Thomas and Elizabeth (née Edwards) Whitefield (newlyweds from Bristol, England), during their honeymoon in Gloucester, purchased both the apothecary and the next door home of Mayor Yates. They converted it into the luxurious Bell Inn (Hotel), complete with full service stables and stores on the bottom floor. The old apothecary building was converted into a tavern with a theater and a ballroom for large social events. Actors were hired by the Whitefield family to perform at Bell Inn Pub Building, once referred to as the Apothecary.

On 27 December 1714, notable preacher and evangelist George Whitefield was born at the Bell Inn, the seventh and last child born to the Whitefields. In 1782, John Phillpott became the landlord of the Bell Inn.

The building at one time hosted the headquarters of the Tory-affiliated True Blue Club when it was founded in 1789. In the nineteenth century 9/9A was also known as the Old Blue shop where blue dye was manufactured by James Lee.

Around this time the left rear wing was rebuilt in brick and sash windows were added to it. Throughout the nineteenth and twentieth century the upper floors were remodeled and in the twentieth century, the shop front was updated. In 1912, 9/9A became part of the Bell Inn.

In 1967, the Bell Inn was closed. It was demolished in the 1970s to make room for the Eastgate Shopping Centre. It was restored in 1992 by Gloucester City Council.

In 2014, Gloucester City Council added LED lights to the front of the building to draw attention to the timber facade at night time.

== Architecture ==
The building has three storeys as well as an attic and cellar. It has a timber facade, which may have been built from the wood of the Mayflower, and is built of brick with a timber frame. There is a brick rear wing to the left. The ground floor serves as the shop front and each upper floor has three large sash windows. There are two hip-roofed dormers which form part of the attic. Inside there is a nineteenth-century staircase up to the first floor. The front room of the first floor has decorative plasterwork and a mid-nineteenth century fireplace within a magnificently carved surround with cherubs, cornucopia and a segmental pediment with broken overmantel with the Yate/Berkeley coat of arms above it which dates to 1650. There are seventeenth century dog-leg stairs which rise from the first to the top floor. The rooms of the second floor and attic are panelled in oak.

== Myths ==
There have been reports that the building is haunted by a spirit called Elsie who likes to move cutlery around.
