= Ladybellegate Street =

Street in Gloucester, England

Coordinates: 51.86453°N 2.24903°W

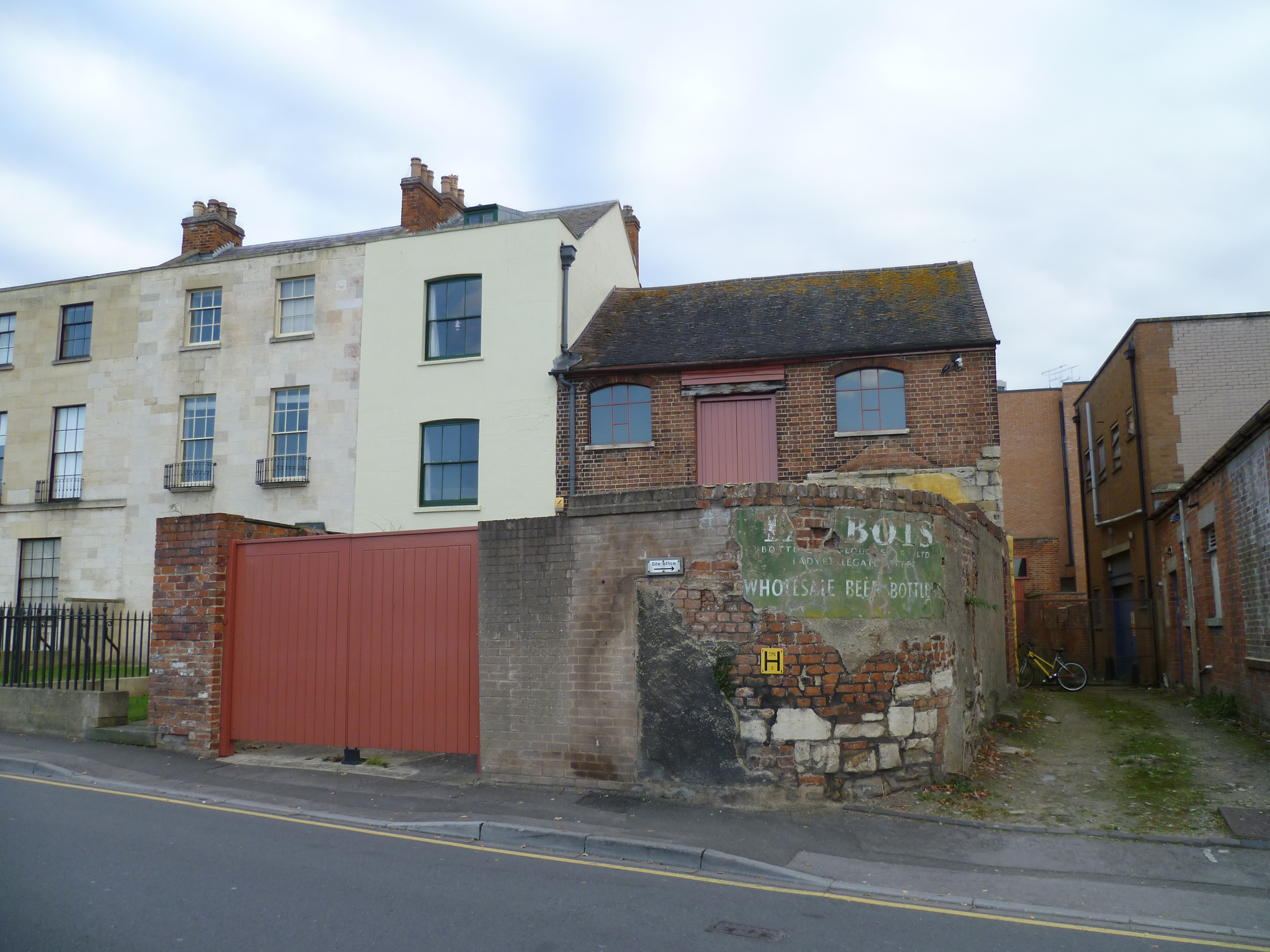
Former premises of Talbots Bottlers

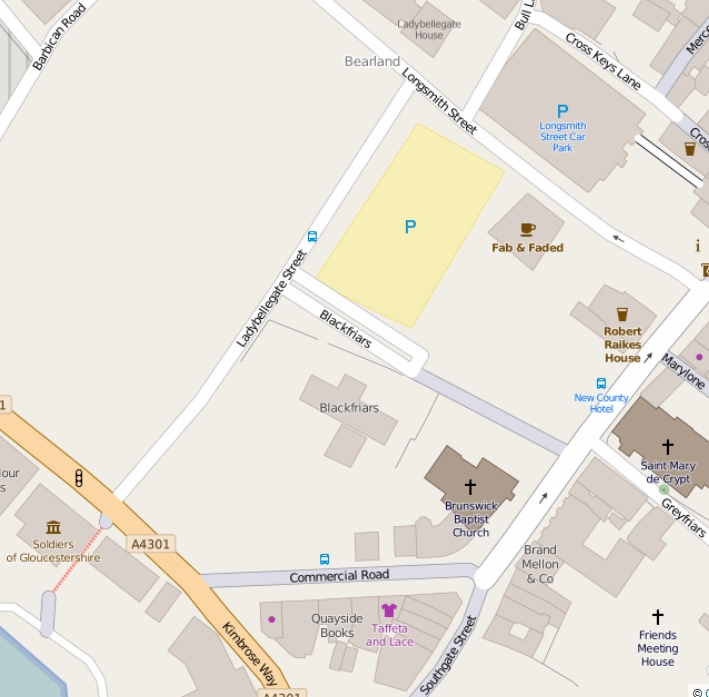
Ladybellegate Street map

Ladybellegate Street is a street in Gloucester that runs from Longsmith Street in the north to Commercial Road in the south. It is joined only by Blackfriars on its eastern side. The former Blackfriars monastery is located on the eastern side of the street together with three grade II* listed town houses and the former premises of Talbots Bottlers.

== History ==
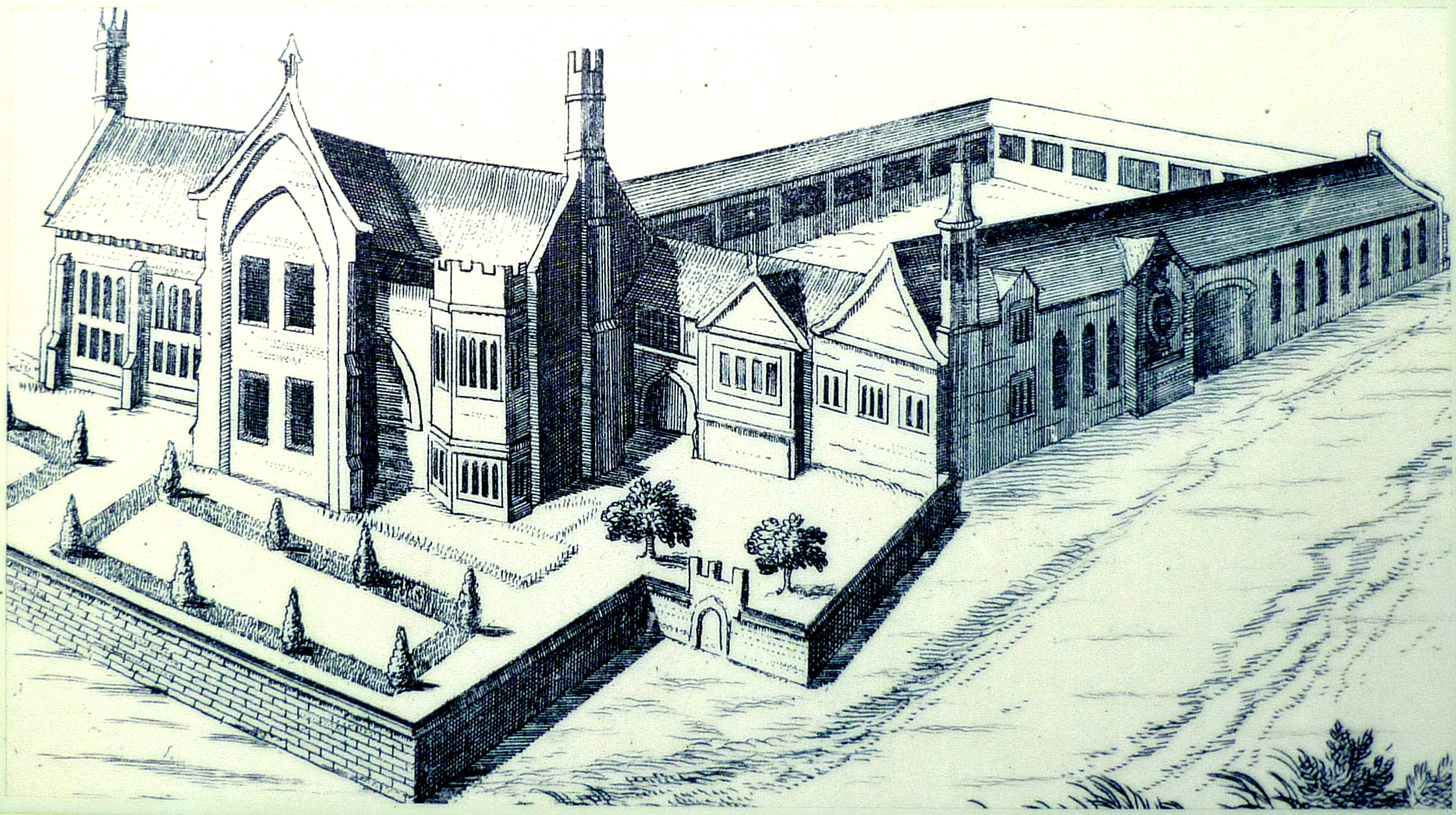
A 1721 view of Blackfriars by William Stukeley. Ladybellegate Street is the track on the right hand side of the image.

The street takes its name from Lady Bell's Gate, after Lady Joan Bell (died 1567), wife of Sir Thomas Bell, which once allowed access to Blackfriars but has since been demolished. The street name was in use from at least 1843. The gate itself was last recorded in 1724. A second Lady Bell's Gate into Blackfriars stood in Southgate Street until the mid eighteenth century.

== Buildings ==
The former Blackfriars monastery is located on the eastern side of the street. Also on that side, on land formerly occupied by Blackfriars, are three grade II* listed town houses at numbers 13, 15 and 17, and the former premises of Talbots Bottlers. All three of the terraced houses incorporate parts of the rubble walls of Blackfriars in their cellars. Numbers 13 and 15 are mirror-image houses.

As of the end of 2015, there were almost no buildings on the western side of the street apart from a few offices at the northern end of the street.

In Longsmith Street, facing the north end of Ladybellegate Street, is Ladybellegate House, the former home of Robert Raikes junior, the founder of Sunday Schools.

== Gallery ==
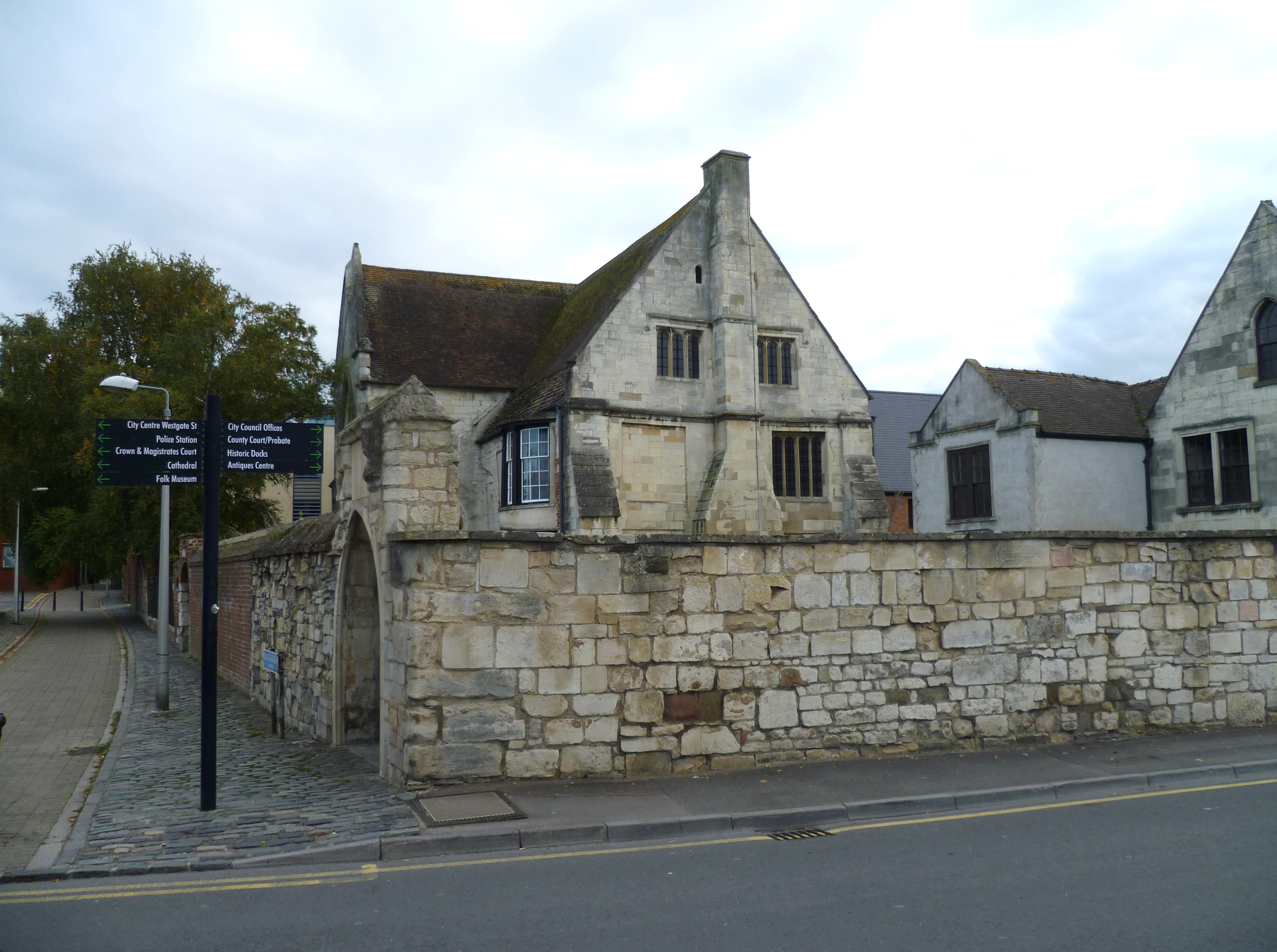
Blackfriars from Ladybellegate Street.

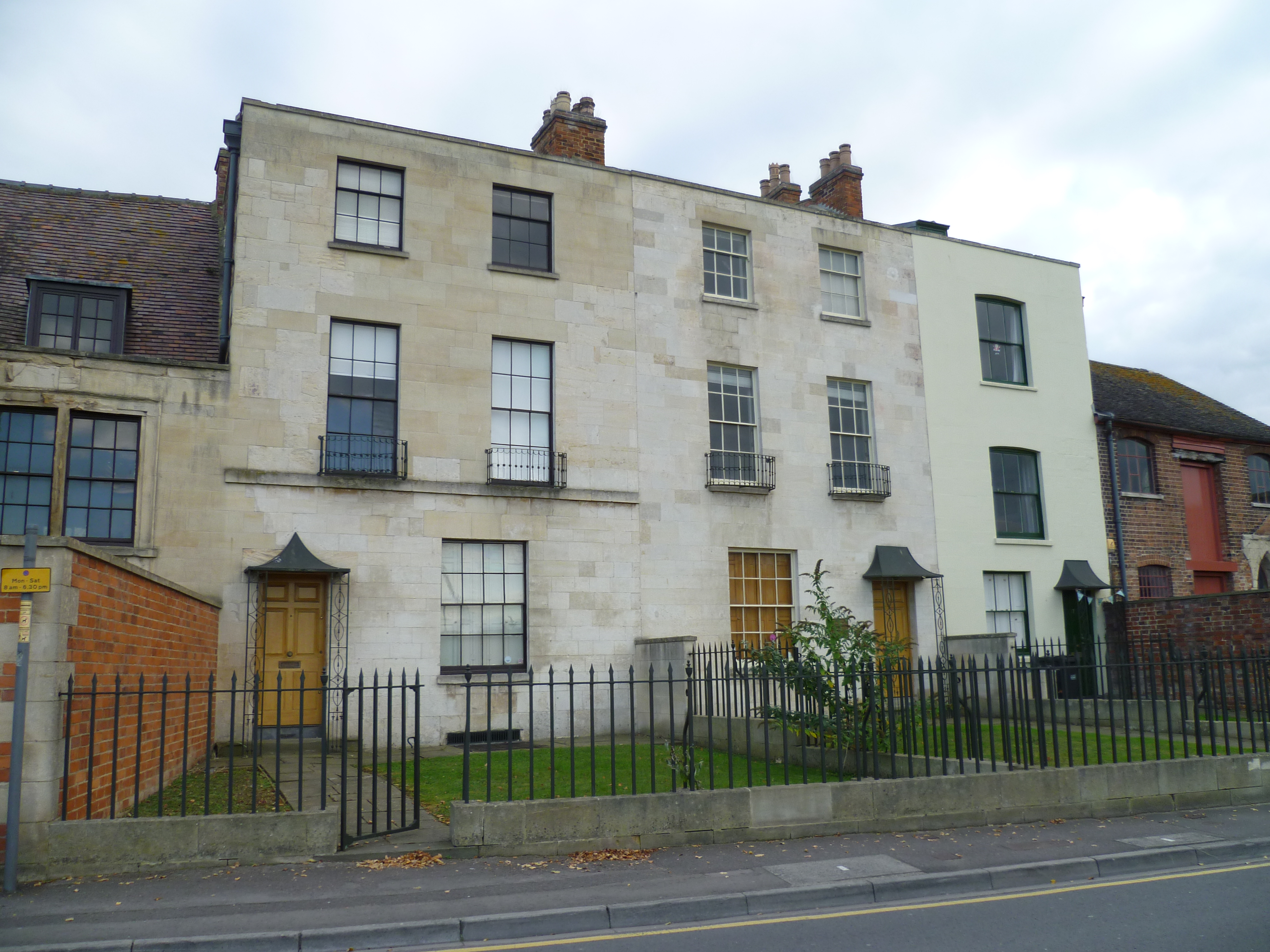
Grade II* listed town houses.
