= Westgate Street =

Street in Gloucester, England

Coordinates: 51°51′57.6″N 2°14′49″W

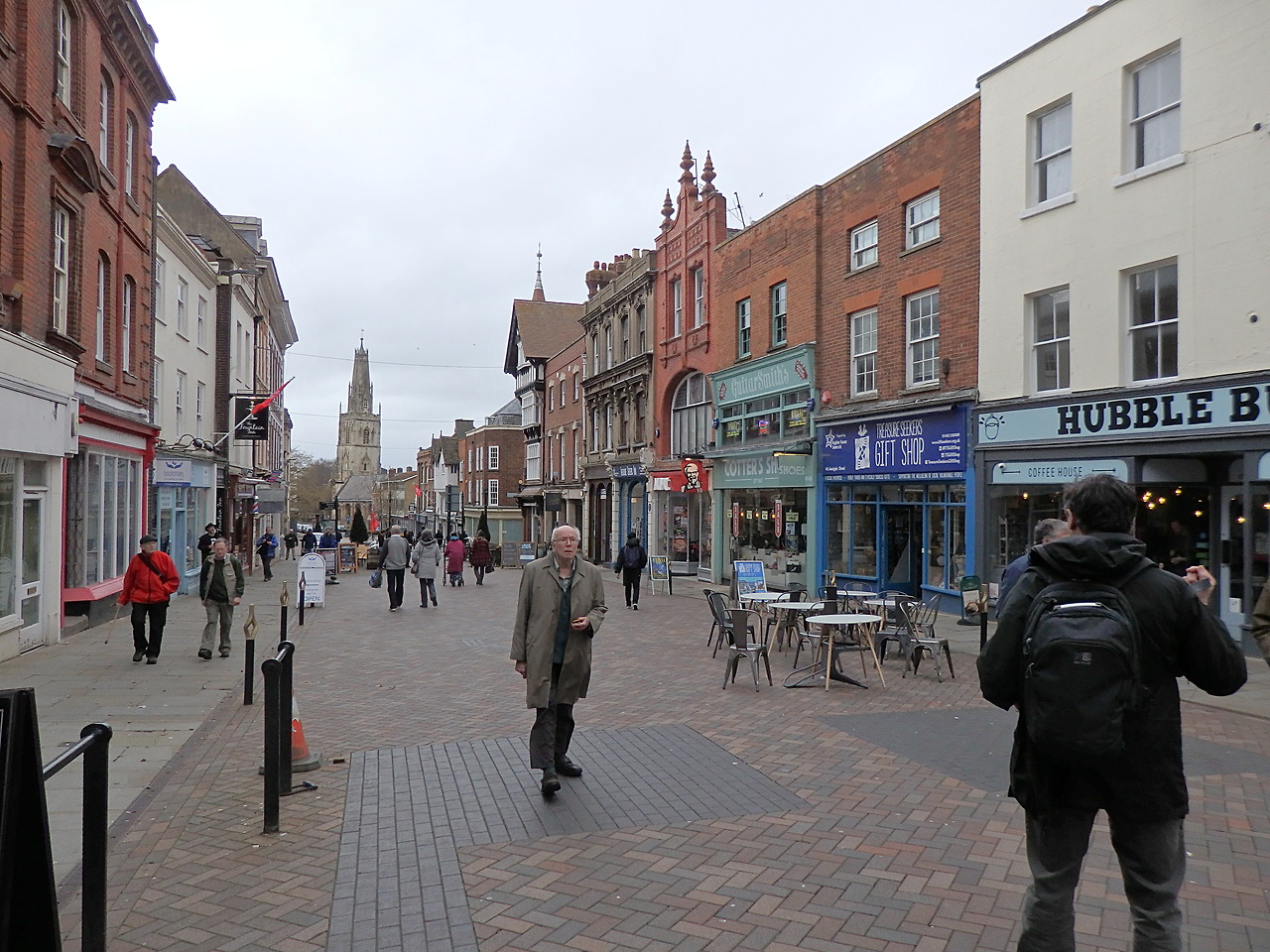
Westgate Street in 2019

Westgate Street is one of the four main streets in the city of Gloucester, England. It is within the Westgate ward.

== See also ==
- Eastgate Street
- Southgate Street
- Northgate Street
