= Northgate Street =

Street in Gloucester, UK

Coordinates: 51.8667°N 2.2438°W

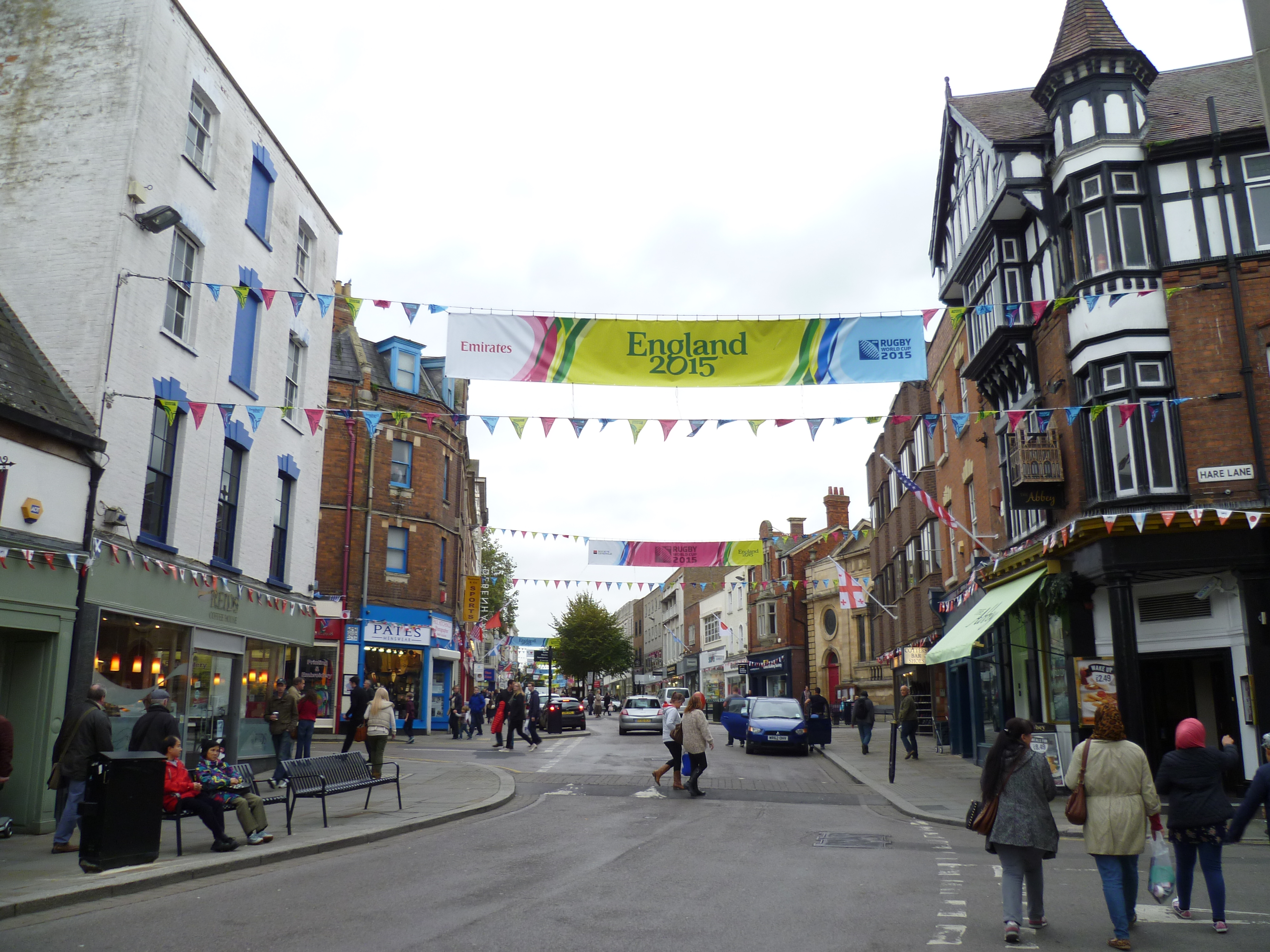
Northgate Street, 2015, looking south from the corner with Hare Lane.

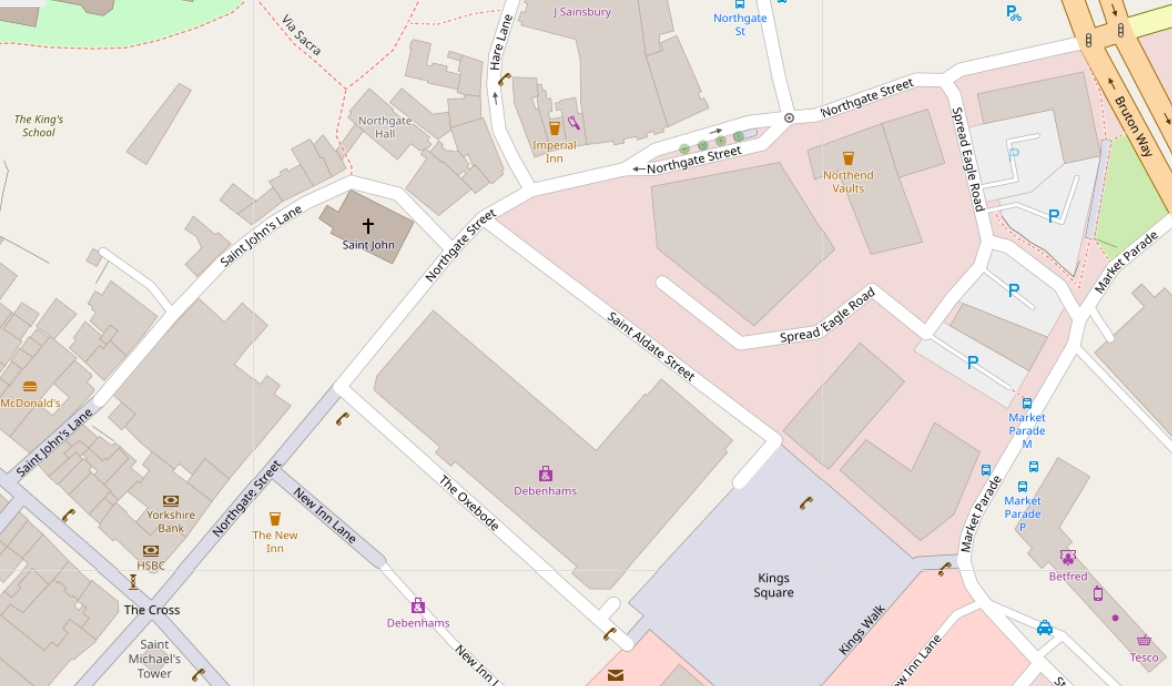
Map of Northgate Street

Northgate Street is a street in the City of Gloucester, so named because its northern end was originally the location of the north gate in the city's walls.

The street runs from the crossroads of Northgate, Eastgate, Southgate, and Westgate Streets in the south (The Cross) to London Road in the north. It is joined by St John's Lane, Hare Lane, and Worcester Street on the north side and The Oxebode, St Aldate Street, and Spread Eagle Road on the south side.

== History ==
Northgate Street dates from at least 1455. The gate to the city's inner defences was roughly between St John's Church and where Hare Lane joins Northgate Street now, while the outer gate was to the east, as Northgate Street took an eastwards turn. The part of the street between the two was known as Lower Northgate. Part of the west end of the street was once known as Cordwainer's Row.

== Listed buildings ==
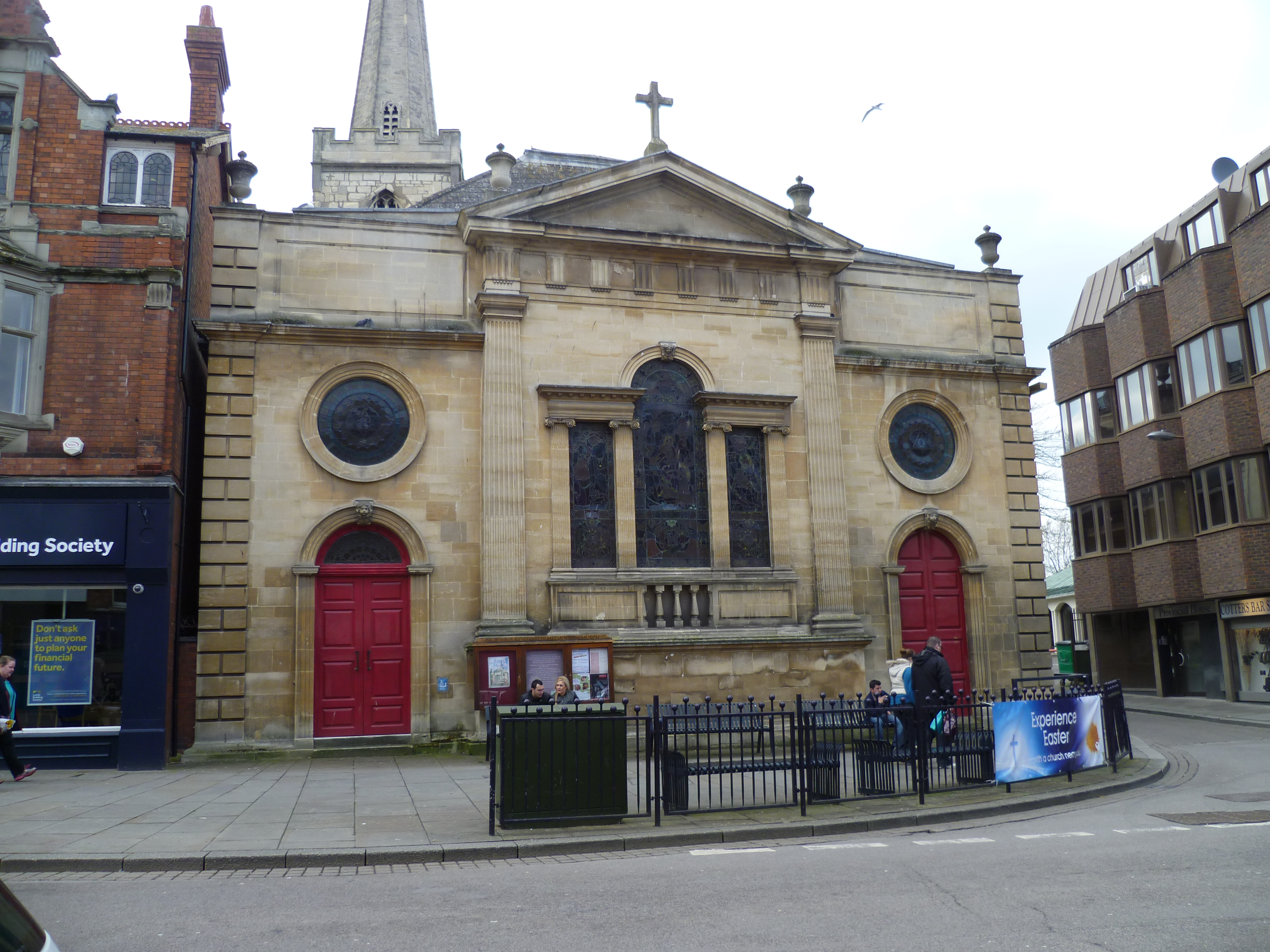
The grade II* listed Church of St John

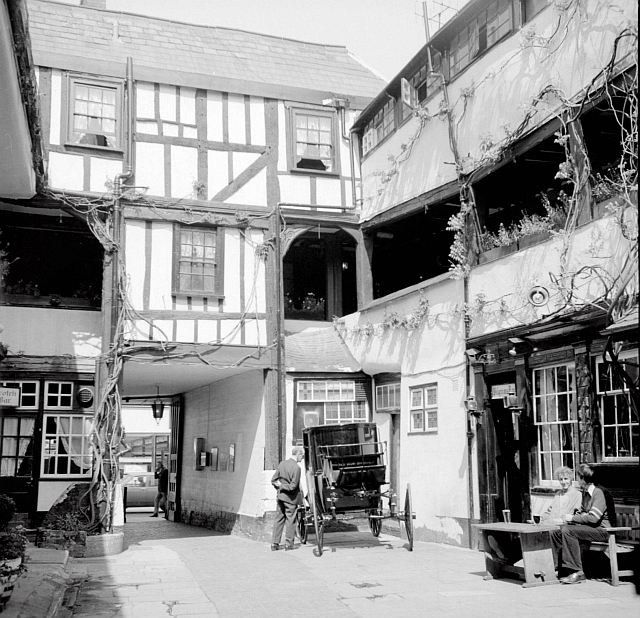
The courtyard of the grade I listed New Inn looking towards Northgate Street

Northgate Street contains a number of listed buildings:

=== North side ===
- 11 Northgate Street
- Church of St John, currently used as a Methodist church
- Imperial Inn

=== South side ===
- 6, 8, and 10 Northgate Street
- The New Inn, grade I listed
- 62 Northgate Street
- Northend Vaults
- 102 Northgate Street
