= Eastgate Shopping Centre, Gloucester =

Eastgate Shopping Centre
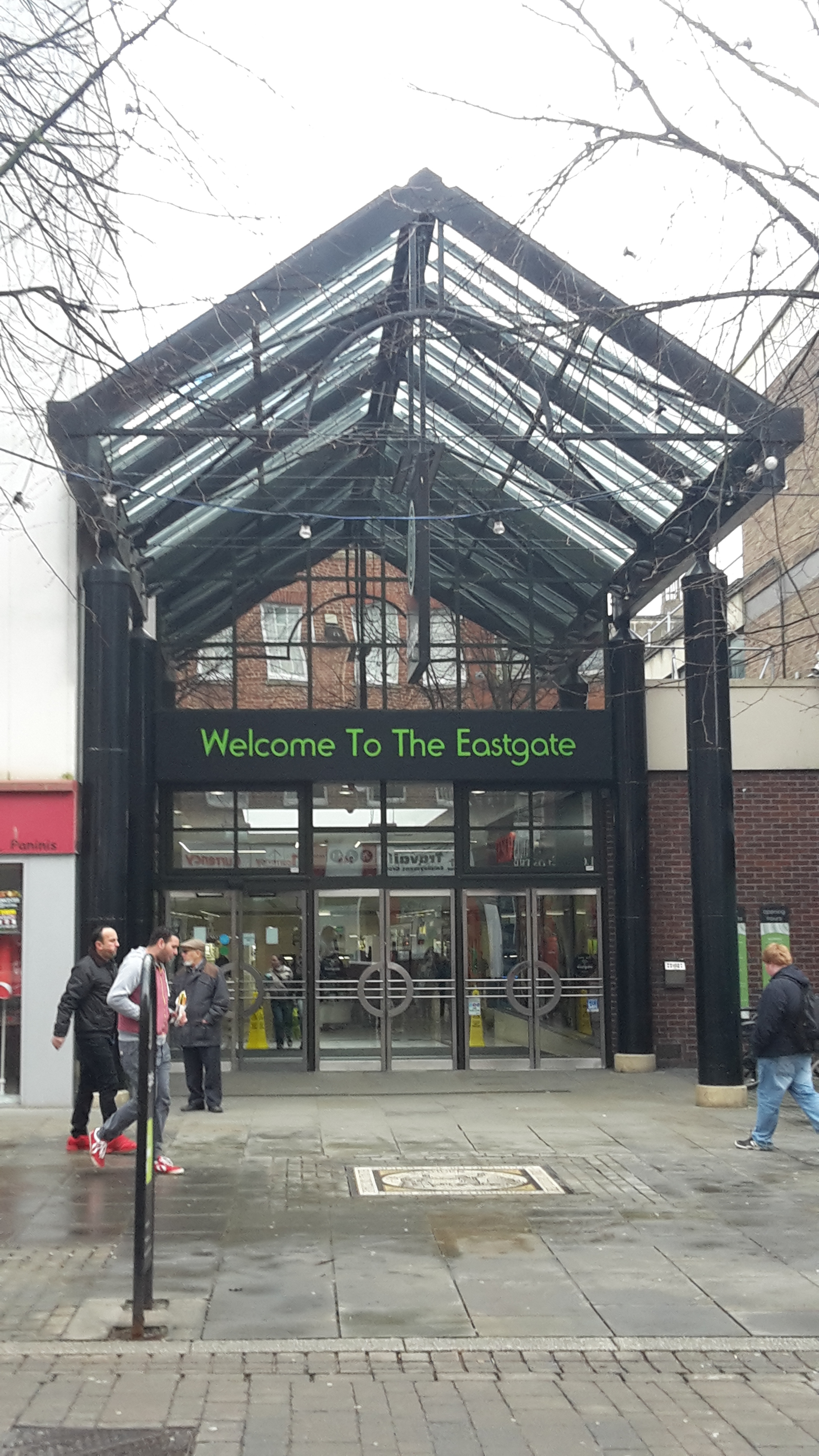
- Location: Gloucester, England
- Coordinates: 51.8643941°N 2.24733611°W
- Address: 22 Eastgate Street
- Opened: July 3, 1973
- Developer: Land Improvements Ltd.
- Owner: Gloucester City Council
- Num. of stores: 53
- Floors: 2
- Parking: 380 (20 disabled spaces / 18 parent and child spaces)
- Website: eastgateshoppingcentre.co.uk

The Eastgate Shopping Centre (formerly The Mall Eastgate and The Mall Gloucester) is a two-story indoor shopping centre in Gloucester, England. It opened its portico entrance on 3 July 1973.

== History ==
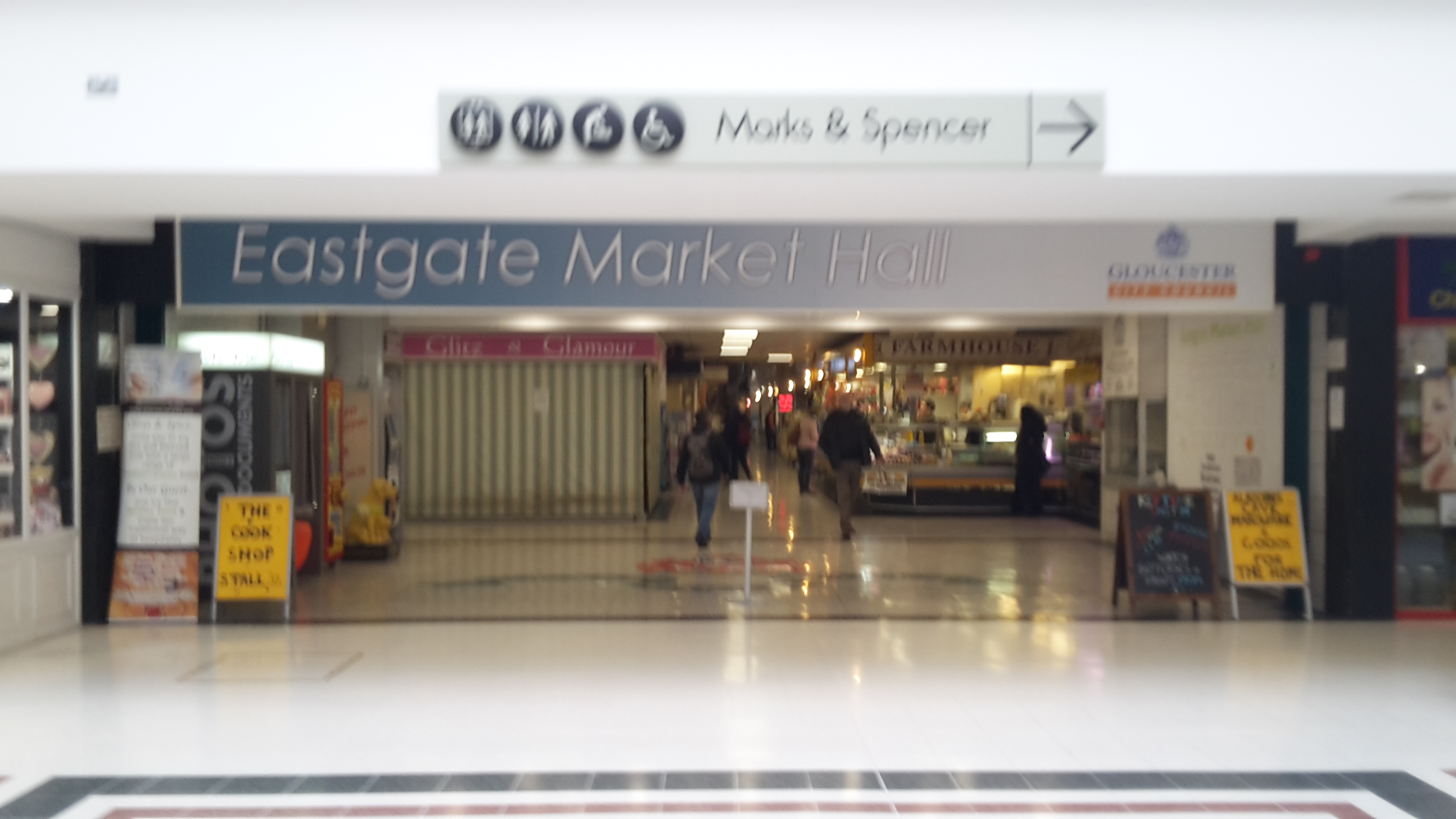
Eastgate Market Entrance

Initially, the site was a market which was opened in 1786 at the same time as the Southgate Street market. In 1855, the Eastgate Street market was rebuilt and modernised. The indoor shopping centre was built between 1966 and 1974 during a large redevelopment of Gloucester City centre. The plans for this development were written by G.A Jellicoe in 1962 and also led to the demolition of several buildings included the Bell Hotel and medieval streets in the north-east and south-east areas of the city centre. Eastgate Shopping Centre consists of a large indoor street, with a ninety degree intersection in the middle. It runs from Eastgate Street to Southgate Street, with a side entrance to Greyfriars. The indoor street is lined with shops on both sides. At this time the centre also included a new market hall and a large Woolworths store which had entrances onto both Eastgate and Southgate street. The centre linked to the Longsmith Street car park and Kings Walk car parks. A pedestrian footbridge on the second floor spanned over Eastgate Street to link the Eastgate and Kings Walk shopping centres however, this has now been closed off. In 1994 redevelopment work was carried out which included some of the columns being faced with architectural features and the Beatrix Potter clock and figures were added next to the market. The cemetery from Greyfriars, founded in 1231, is now under the Eastgate shopping centre. The Mall Fund bought Eastgate shopping centre in 2004 for £40 million from Catalyst Capital, then Rockspring Property Investment Managers and The Other Retail Group brought it in 2010 for £136 million. In January 2019, Gloucester City Council bought the shopping centre in the region of £12 million from Rockspring Property Investment Managers and The Other Retail Group.

On 23 March 2009, Heart Gloucestershire was launched from the Bridge Studios within the shopping centre.

== Future Plans ==
Between February 2018 and June 2018, work will be carried out to renovate the first floor of the shopping centre. The floor will be turned into a Digital Retail innovation Centre which will test and develop “disruptive digital innovations”, such as Robots and Holograms, in attempt to turn the shopping centre into a Digital Innovation Hub. Eleven small shop units are also being built. By 2025, it is planned to become a national centre for developing Holographic Virtual Employees and Robotic Security Guards. Gloucestershire's Local Enterprise Partnership program has provided £400,000 to fund this project.

== Portico Entrance ==
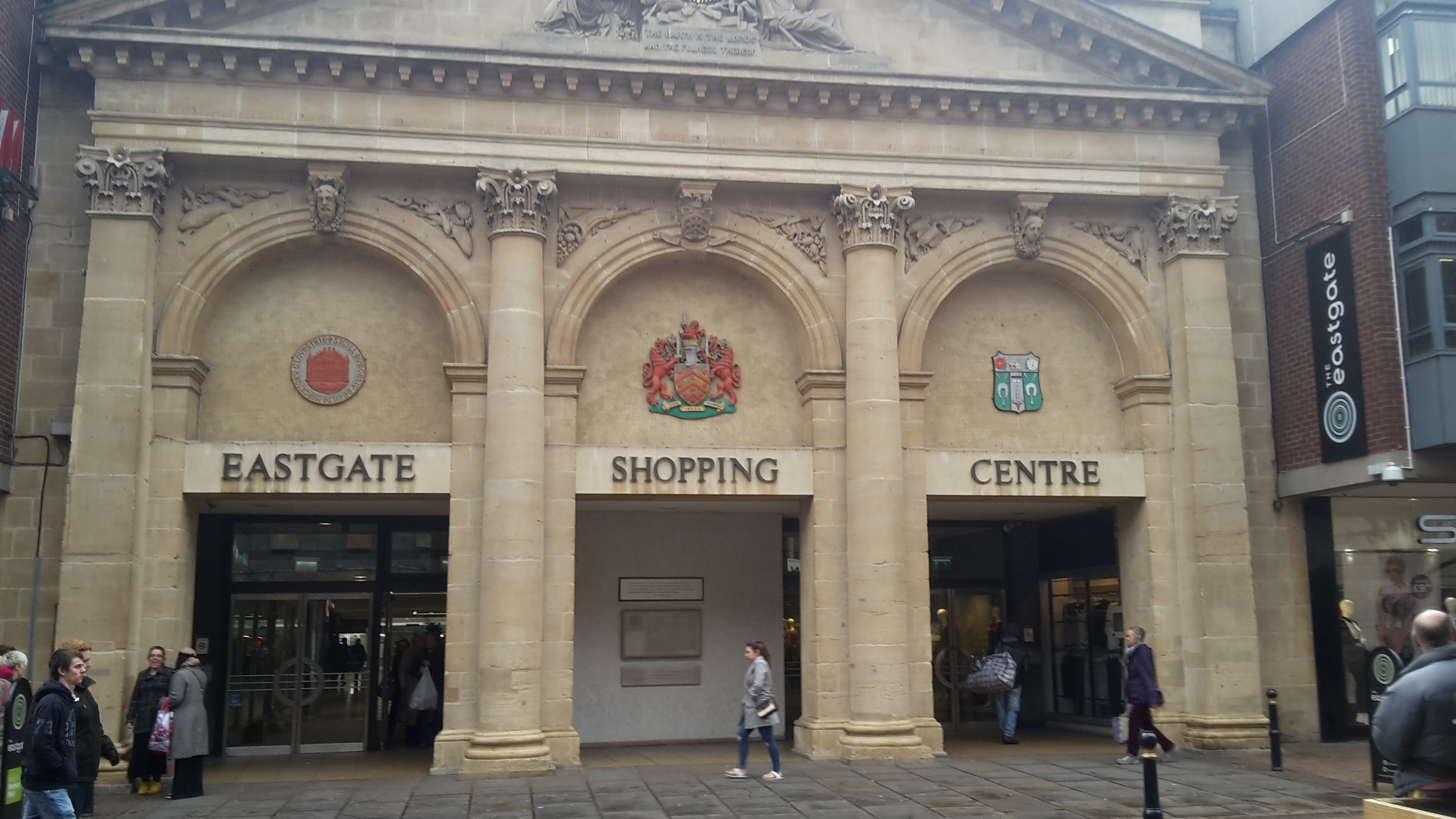
Eastgate Shopping Centre Portico Entrance

The Portico entrance was built by Medland & Maberly in 1856 and was originally the entrance to the Eastgate market. In 1973, the portico was moved down Eastgate Street by about 25 feet from its original location to form the entrance to the new Eastgate Shopping Centre. The portico is made out of classical stone blocks. It is built in the monumental italianate style. The exterior consists of three arches with two central piers framed by a corinthian half column and two end piers framed by rectangular columns. All of the piers are set upon pedestals. Above the arches there is a crowning pediment with a clock in the middle flanked by seated figures sculpted in high relief. Father time is on the right and Ceres is the figure on the left. The crowning pediment supports an arched bell turret flanked by scrolls and topped with another pediment. There were pairs of Iron gates under each arch of the Portico. However, these were not replaced when it was rebuilt after being moved from the original site. In 2015, the original Iron gates were found in a council yard by the Gloucester Rotary Club. The portico became a grade II-listed building in 1975.

== Tailor of Gloucester clock- AKA Beatrix Potter Clock ==
In 1994, due to the redevelopment of the shopping centre a large fish tank, inside the shopping centre next to the market entrance, was removed and the Beatrix Potter clock was added to replace it. The clock featured an animated Tailor of Gloucester, mice, owl and cat and took approximately fifteen months to build. On the hour, the clock would chime then music was played and all the figures would move. You would find crowds of people waiting to look at it. In 2013, another redevelopment off the shopping centre took place the clock was removed having been there since 1994. A petition to save the clock was created but the shopping centre donated it to the Pied Piper Appeal.
