= Lloyds Bank, Gloucester =

Bank building in Gloucester, England

Lloyds Bank
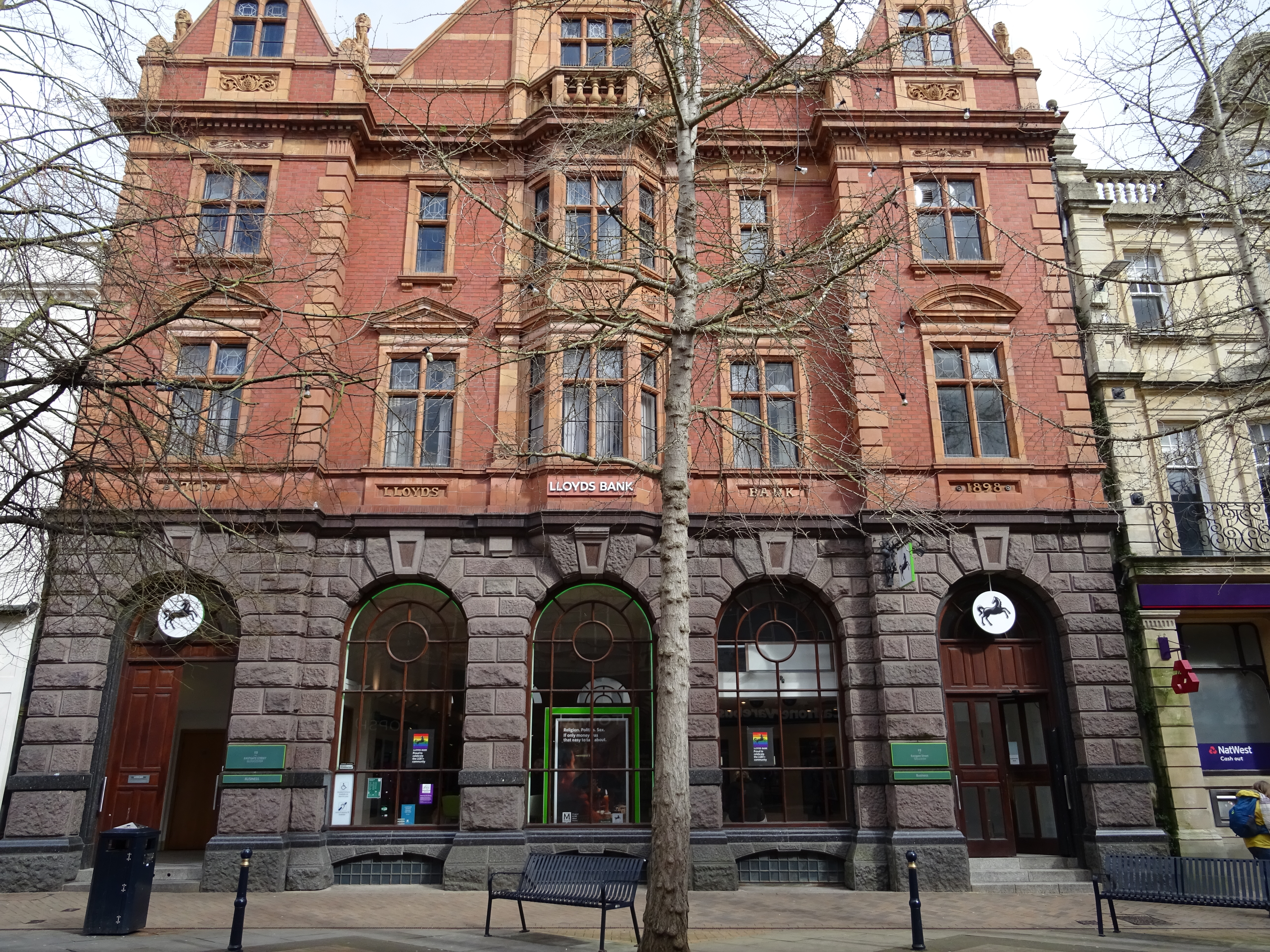

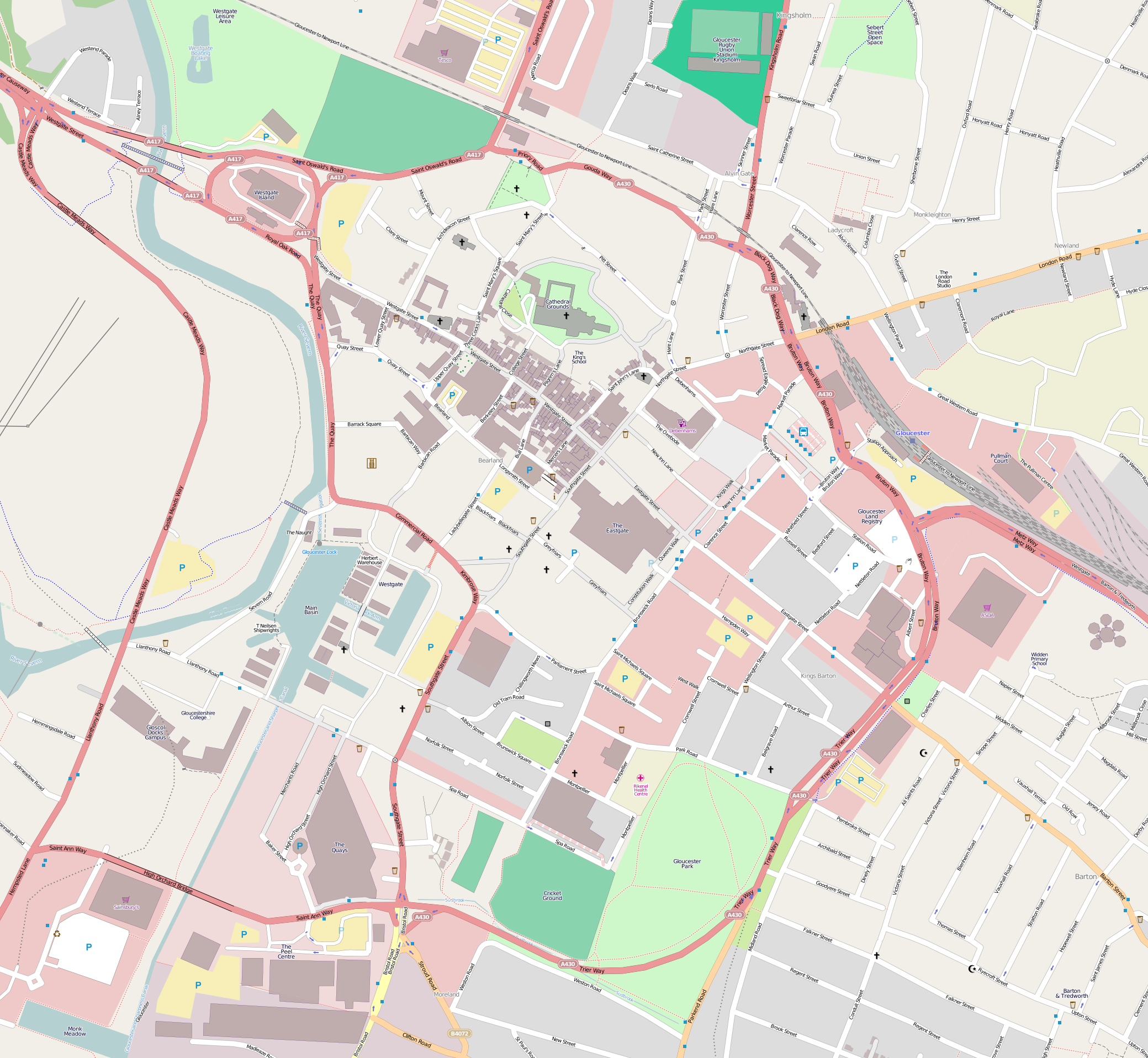
- Location within Gloucester Central

General information
- Location: Gloucester, England
- Coordinates: 51°51′54″N 2°14′50″W
- Completed: 1898

Design and construction
- Architects: F.W Waller and Son

Lloyds Bank is a Grade II listed building at 19 Eastgate Street, Gloucester, Gloucestershire, England. It was grade II listed on 15 December 1998.

== History ==
The building was built exclusively for Lloyds Bank in 1898 by F.W Waller and Son. In 1929, the building underwent 'extensive refurbishment'.

== Architecture ==
The building is in the Northern Renaissance style. It is constructed primarily of red brick, with granite ashlar and terracotta detail. It has a tiled roof. The building consists of three storeys, a cellar and an attic. The front is symmetrical, consisting of five bays with a slight projection in the end bays on either side of the building. The ground floor is fronted by five arches, each with tilted and paneled keystones, apart from the central arch which is topped with a rock-faced corbel on either side of a keystone to support the central bay window. Inside the arches of each end bay there are 20th century metal framed doorways with plain fanlights, and metal framed windows within the arches of the three central bays. Above the arches is an ashlar apron with raised panels below the windows. There is a central bay window which rises from the first to the second floor; it is set in stone. The window itself is a cross mullion and transom window with casements. On the first floor in the bays to either side there are further cross mullion and transom windows with casements in architrave frames, topped with entablatures crowned by segmental pediments on the projecting end bays and triangular pediments on the inner bays. On the second floor, there is a similar arrangement, except that the inner bay windows only have single panes with transom. All the windows have moulded stone sills. Where each end bay protrudes there are stone quoins which rise to the crowning entablature. There is a decorative dentil cornice on the underside of the entablature. A false parapet above the cornice supports the attic gables. Above this there is a large gable that spans the three central bays. There are smaller gables sitting above each end bay. The central gable has a three-pane mullion and transom window in an architrave frame with an entablature crowned by a swan-neck pediment. In the apex of the gable there is an oculus under a hood mould. The window and oculus are flanked by polygonal shafts capped with spike finials. There is another capped finial above the apex of the gable.
