= Eastgate Street =

Ancient street in Gloucester, England

Coordinates: 51.8635°N 2.2424°W

Eastgate Street is one of the ancient streets in Gloucester, so named because its eastern end was originally the location of the east gate in the city's walls. The part beyond the gate as far as GL1 leisure Centre was part of Barton Street It runs from the crossroads of Northgate, Eastgate, Southgate and Westgate Streets in the West (The Cross) to Barton Street in the East.

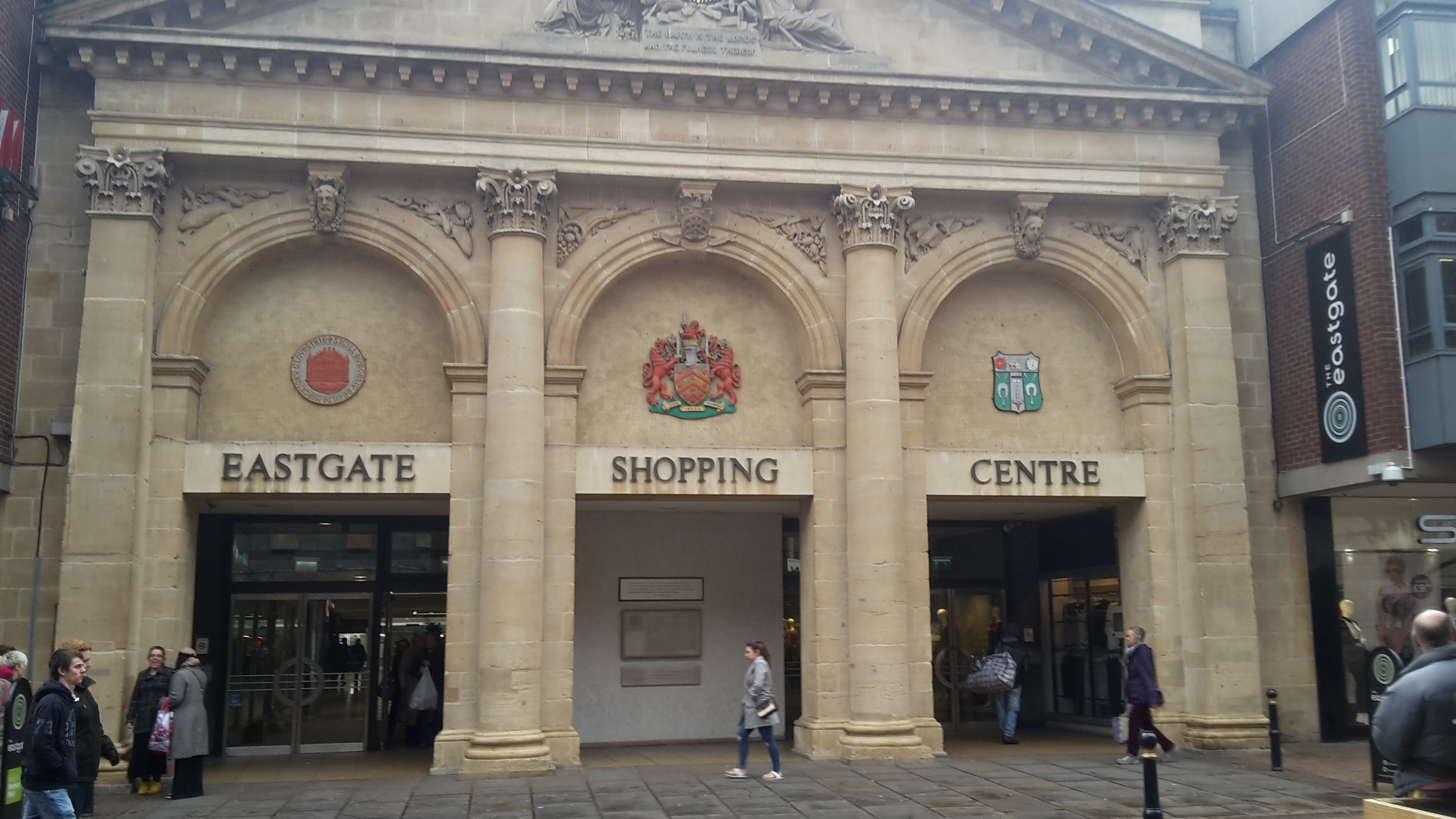
Eastgate Street Shopping center

== History ==
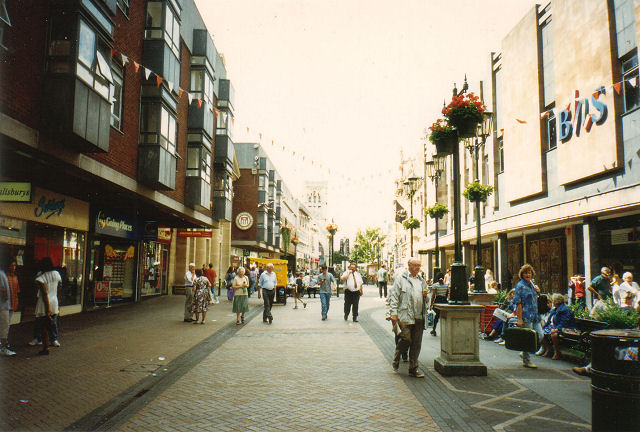
A view of Eastgate Street towards the cross in 1996

Eastgate Street is one of the four central streets of Gloucester, it dates back to Roman times when they established a Roman fort at Kingsholm in 48 AD on the site of the city which soon became the Roman settlement of Glevum.

After the Norman conquest in 1066 the city defences were rebuilt, the new work being based partly on the Roman defence. In the mid-13th century the east gate was rebuilt and upgraded into a substantial bastioned structure. In the late Middle Ages the east gate was manned by porters and at which tolls were collected, it was one of the 5 main gates into the city at this time. It accommodated a prison in 1485 which, in 1560, housed female prisoners and, from 1613, was used as a correction centre. During the siege of Gloucester in 1643, the main Royalist engineering effort was engaged in mining operations against the east gate.

Until 1275 Eastgate Street was the Jewish quarter and known as Jews or Jewry Street. The name Eastgate Street can be seen in records starting from 1473, though the name Ailesgate Street is also mentioned in 1330 and 1709. It was initially the least favoured of the four Gloucester gates, but became established as an important commercial route in the early-16th century following the development of the Stroud Valley cloth industry. Because of this, the parish of St. Michael, to which the street belonged, became one of the wealthiest second only to St. Nicholas on Westgate Street.

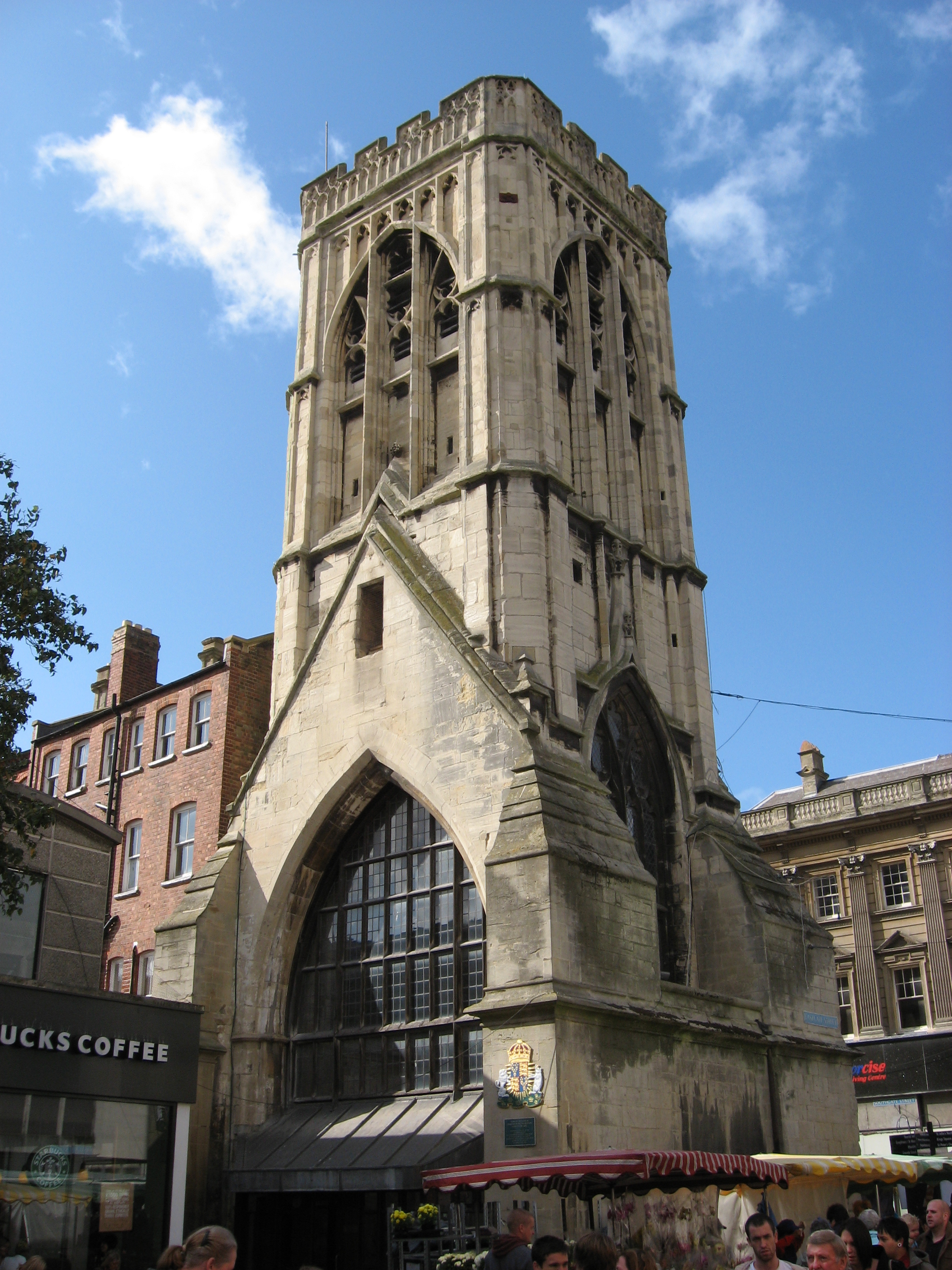
St Michael's Tower in 2008

St. Michael's Church was built on The Cross, where the four gate streets meet, by the mid-12th century. There is evidence to suggest the church was rebuilt in the 14th century, and the tower was added in 1465. It became a Grade II* listed building in 1952.

A barley market that once stood close to the east gate was in 1655 replaced by a new market building in the middle of the street, half-way between gate and The Cross. In 1737 country gardeners were allocated space on the street to sell their produce. In 1666 Sir Thomas Rich donated a house on Eastgate Street for use as the school that took his name (and was also known as the Bluecoat Hospital).

In the 18th century Gloucester was a social centre for county gentry, and the Crawley-Boevey family of Flaxley maintained an old gabled house on Eastgate Street. The city's pubs and hotels profited from its popularity. By the 1720s the Saracen's Head on Eastgate Street boasted stabling for sixty horses.

Due to the increase in wheeled transport, obstacles to traffic were removed from the gate streets in the mid-18th century. This led in 1786 to the construction of a new market hall on Eastgate Street. The medieval east gate was demolished in 1778.

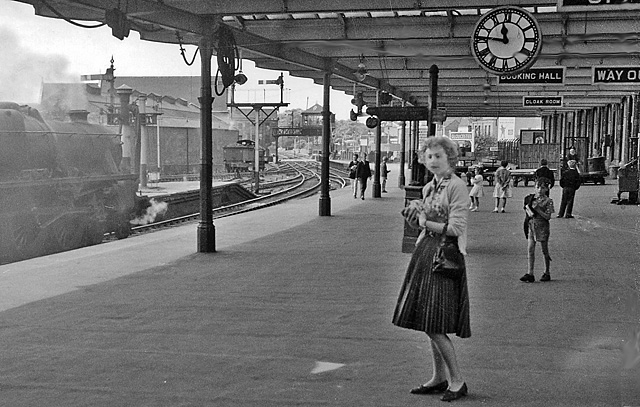
Eastgate Railway station in 1961 towards Barton Street

The Eastgate railway station opened in 1896, and so the street became one of the busiest parts of the city. The street was widened at The Cross by the rebuild on a different alignment of all but the tower of St. Michael's Church, which was re-consecrated in 1851. Another change to the streetscape came in 1856 with the rebuilding of Eastgate Market.

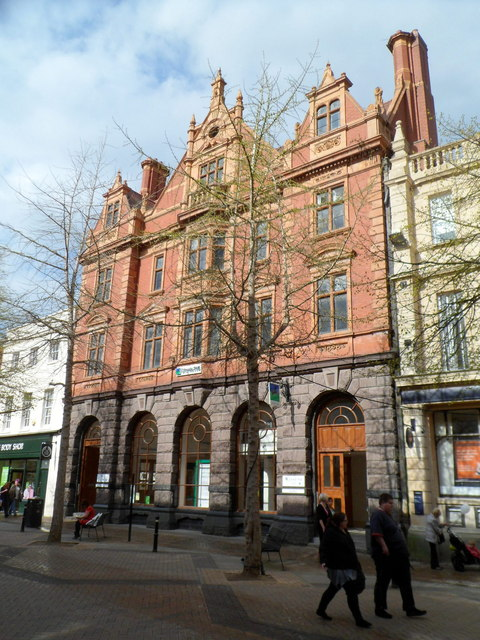
Lloyds TSB in 2012

Gloucester became an important regional banking centre in the 19th century. Two banks were built in Eastgate street: the National Provincial Bank in 1889, built on the site of the Crawley-Boevey house, and Lloyds Bank in 1898. On the other side of the National Provincial building, the Guildhall was built 1892 on the site of Sir Thomas Rich's School, which had moved to the former Crypt school in Barton Street three years before.

Eastgate Street was redeveloped during the 20th century. Large stores began to replace the historic buildings along the street in the inter-war period. The expansion of the Co-op store on the corner of Eastgate Street and Brunswick Road resulted in the demolition of densely packed terraced housing on Queen Street, amongst which was the birth-place of Gloucester composer and war-poet Ivor Gurney.

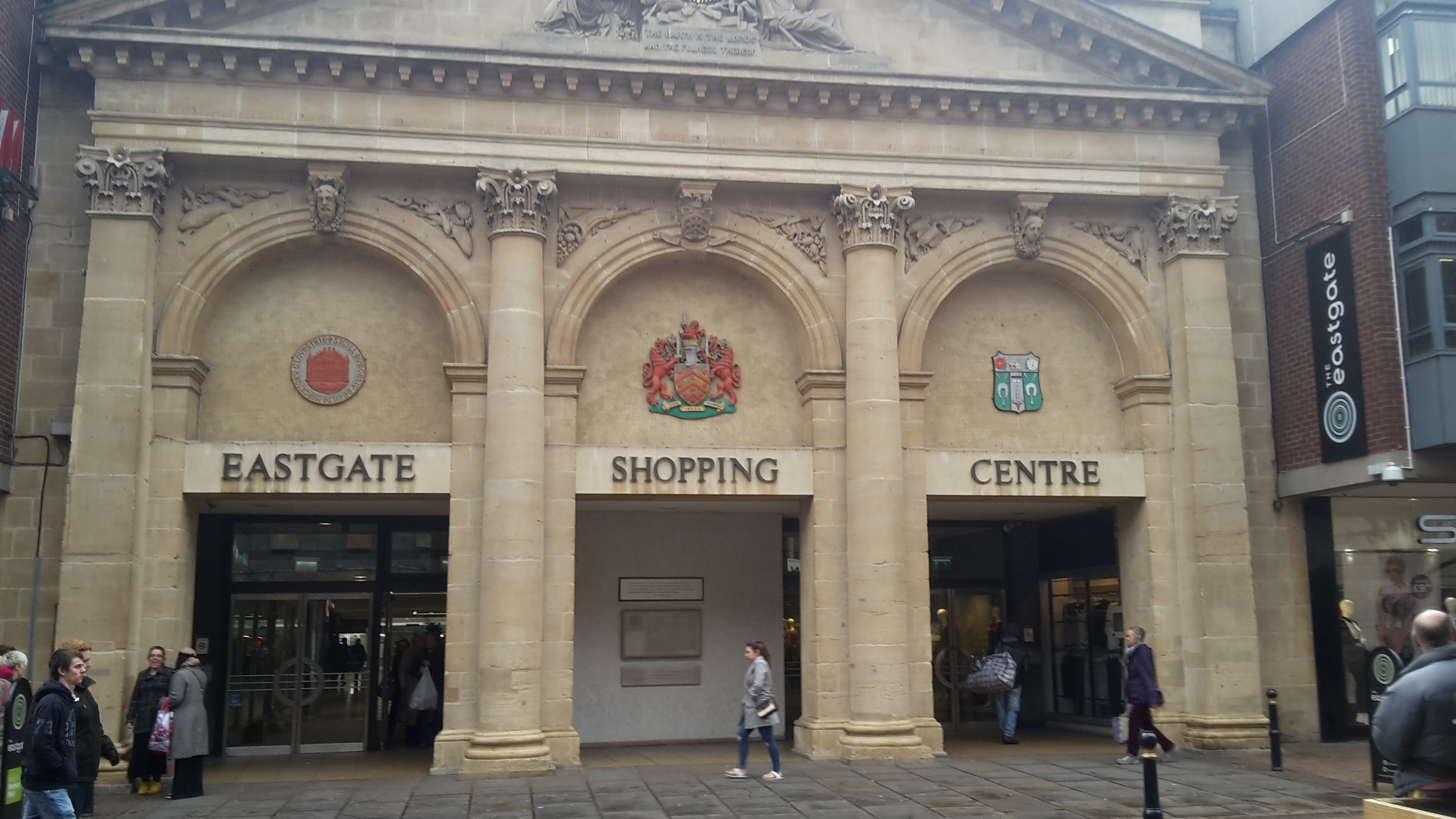
Eastgate Shopping Centre entrance in 2017

St. Michael's Church was closed early in the Second World War and, due to a declining congregation, all but the tower demolished to make way for shops in 1956. Between 1966 and 1974 the construction of the Eastgate Shopping Centre resulted in the demolition of a large part of the historic Eastgate Street area. The development replaced the 19th century market, converted historic Bell Lane into a car park ramp and transformed Queen Street into the covered passage of today's Queen's Way. The construction of Boots on the site of the Co-op in 1980 gave the city a view of the archaeological remains of the medieval east gate bastion in the Eastgate Viewing Chamber but destroyed the archaeological remains of the Roman wall below on the rest of the site.

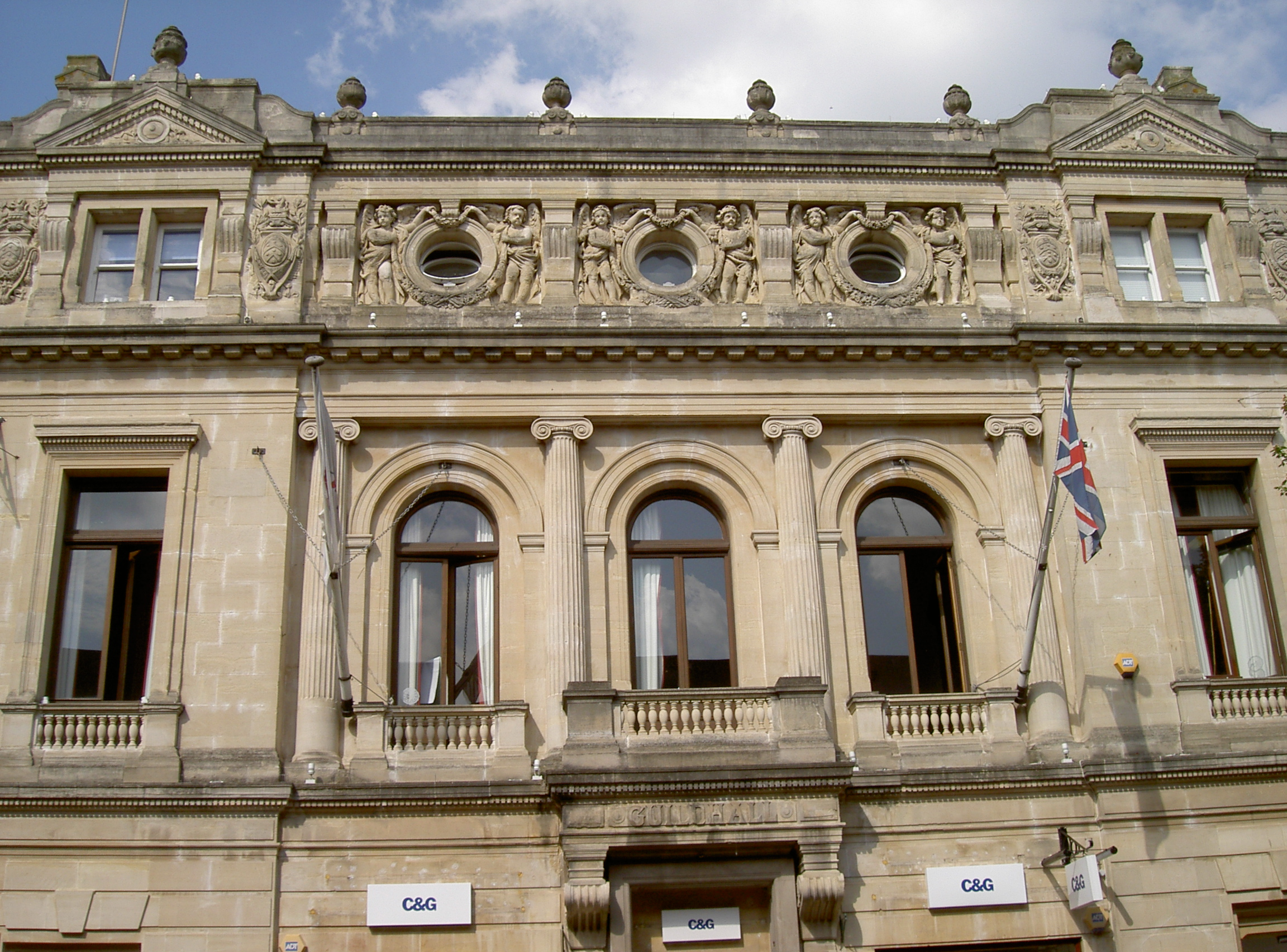
Gloucester Guildhall in 2013

Only a small amount of the street's historic heritage survives today, and there are just six listed sites between gate and The Cross compared to the twenty-seven listed sites along upper Westgate Street. On the south side, St. Michael's Tower is now the headquarters of the Gloucester Civic Trust. In the 1960s, the 19th-century Eastgate Market portico was moved from its original location further down the street so it could stands as the entrance to Eastgate Shopping Centre.

On the north side of the street there is a cluster of four listed sites. The Guildhall remained a Council office until 1985, when the Council moved to offices in the docks and the building was sold to the Cheltenham and Gloucester Building Society. It is today a branch of the TSB and home to the Gloucester Guildhall arts venue. Next door, the National Provincial Bank is now a branch of that bank's successor, NatWest. The red-stone Lloyds still stands, and its neighbour, no. 17, was originally built in the late-18th century as a shop and dwelling and is currently home to a branch of Body Shop.

== Listed buildings ==
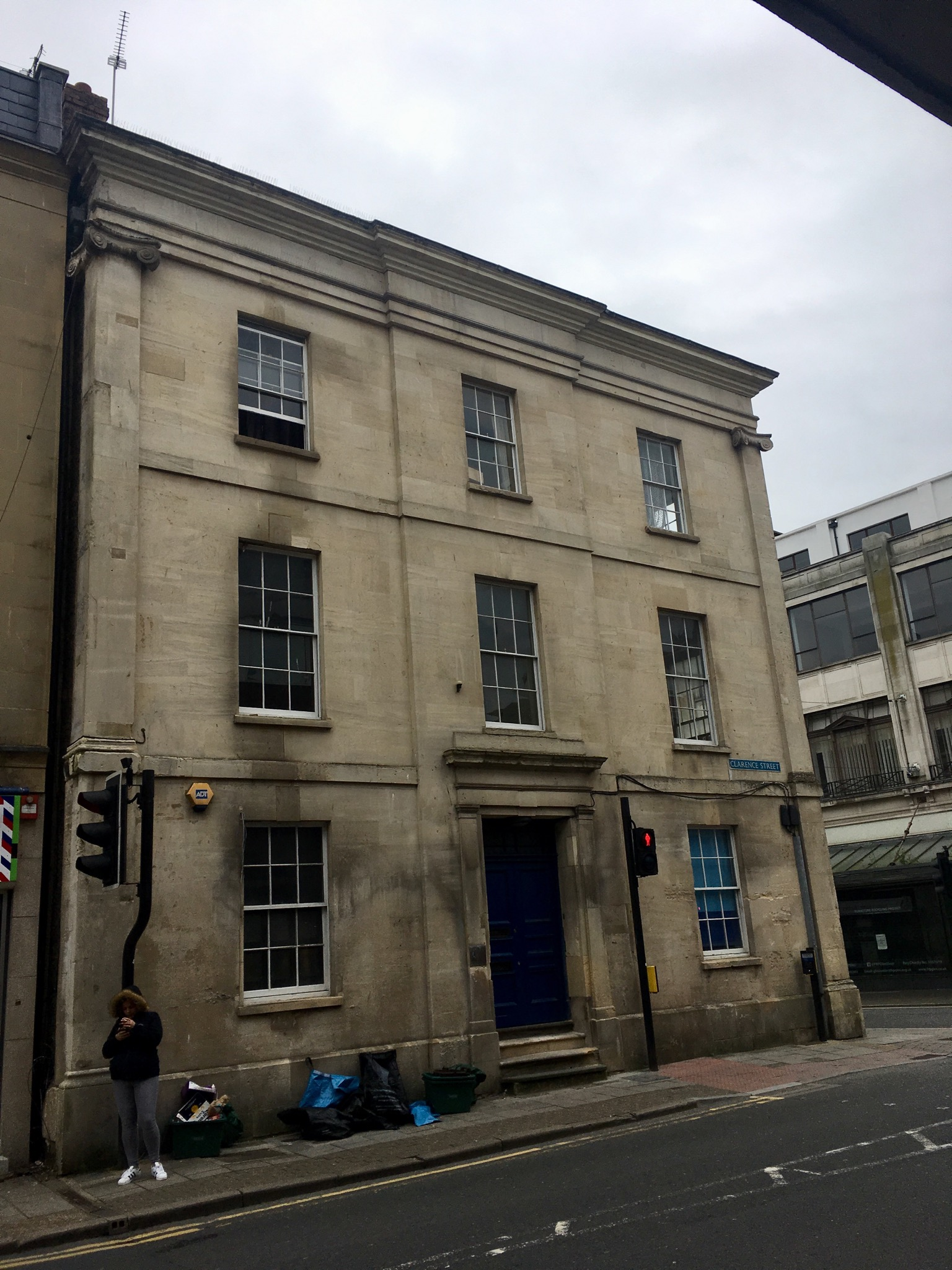
57 Eastgate Street in 2020

Listed buildings in Eastgate Street, north to south, are:

=== North side ===
- 17 Eastgate Street
- Lloyds Bank (19 Eastgate Street)
- National Westminster Bank (21 Eastgate Street)
- Gloucester Guildhall (23 Eastgate Street)
- 57 Eastgate Street/2 Clarence Street
- 67 and 69 Eastgate Street
- 87 Eastgate Street
- Annandale House (105 Eastgate Street)
- 111 Eastgate Street

=== South side ===
- 58 Eastgate Street
- 62 and 64 Eastgate Street
- 66 Eastgate Street
- 70 Eastgate Street
- 72 Eastgate Street
- 80 and 80a Eastgate Street
- Ivy House (94 Eastgate Street)
- 96, 98 and 100 Eastgate Street
- 108 Eastgate Street
