= Commercial Road, Gloucester =

Road in the City of Gloucester, England

Coordinates: 51.8641°N 2.2502°W

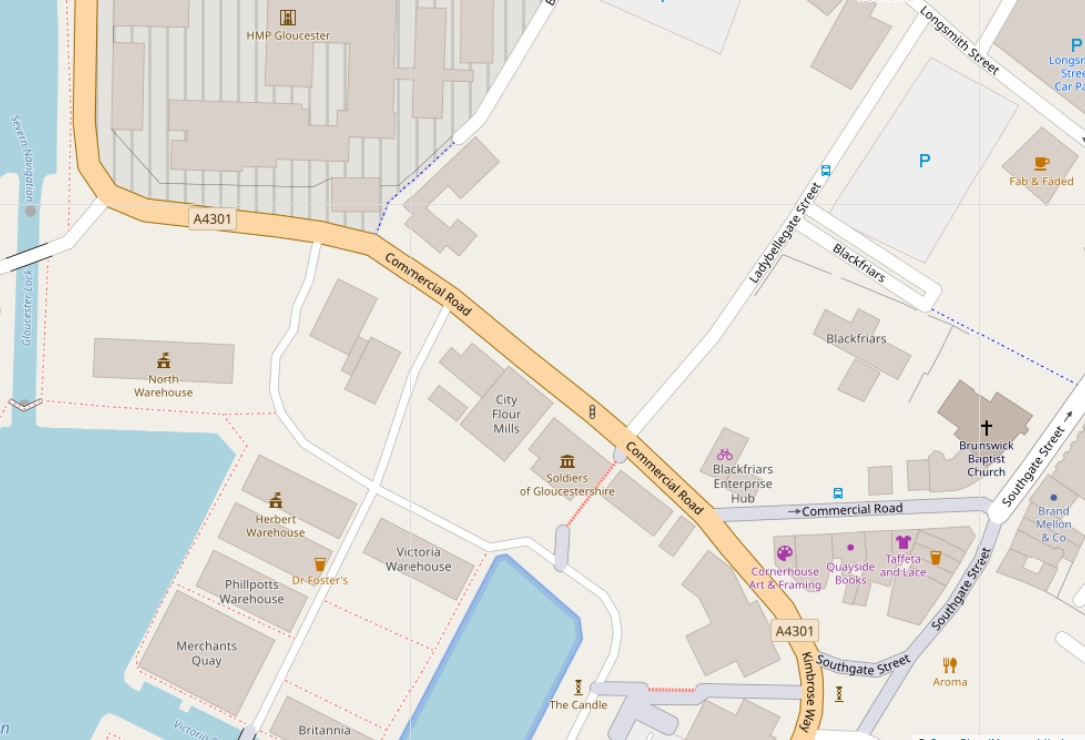
Map of Commercial Road

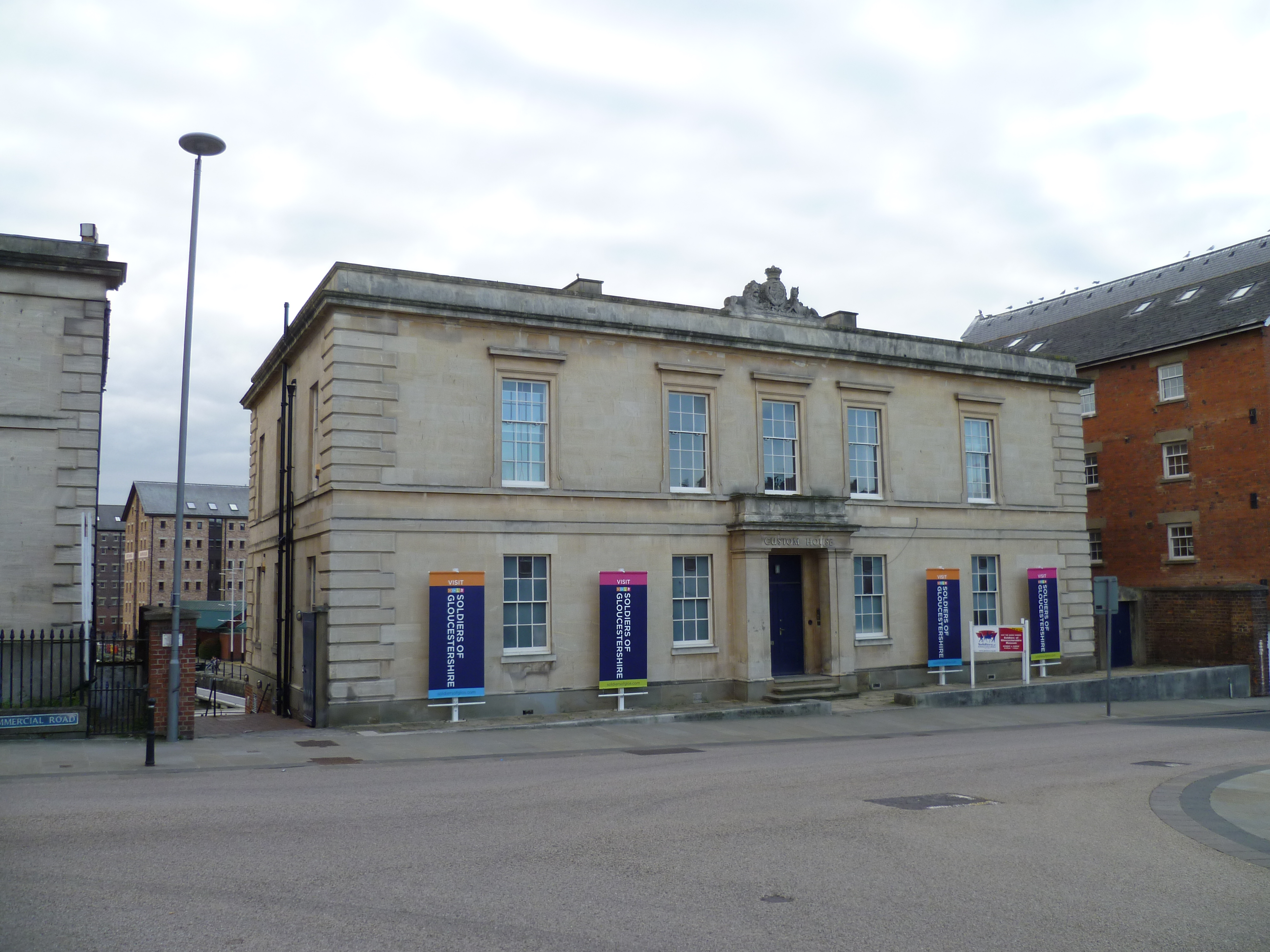
Soldiers of Gloucestershire Museum

Commercial Road is located in the City of Gloucester, England. It runs from The Quay and Severn Road in the north to Kimbrose Way and Southgate Street in the south. It is joined by Barbican Road and Ladybellegate Street on the north side and by entrances to Gloucester Docks on the south side.

On the north side on the corner with Barbican Road is the former Gloucester Prison and the former site of Blackfriars on the corner with Ladybellegate Street.

== Listed buildings ==
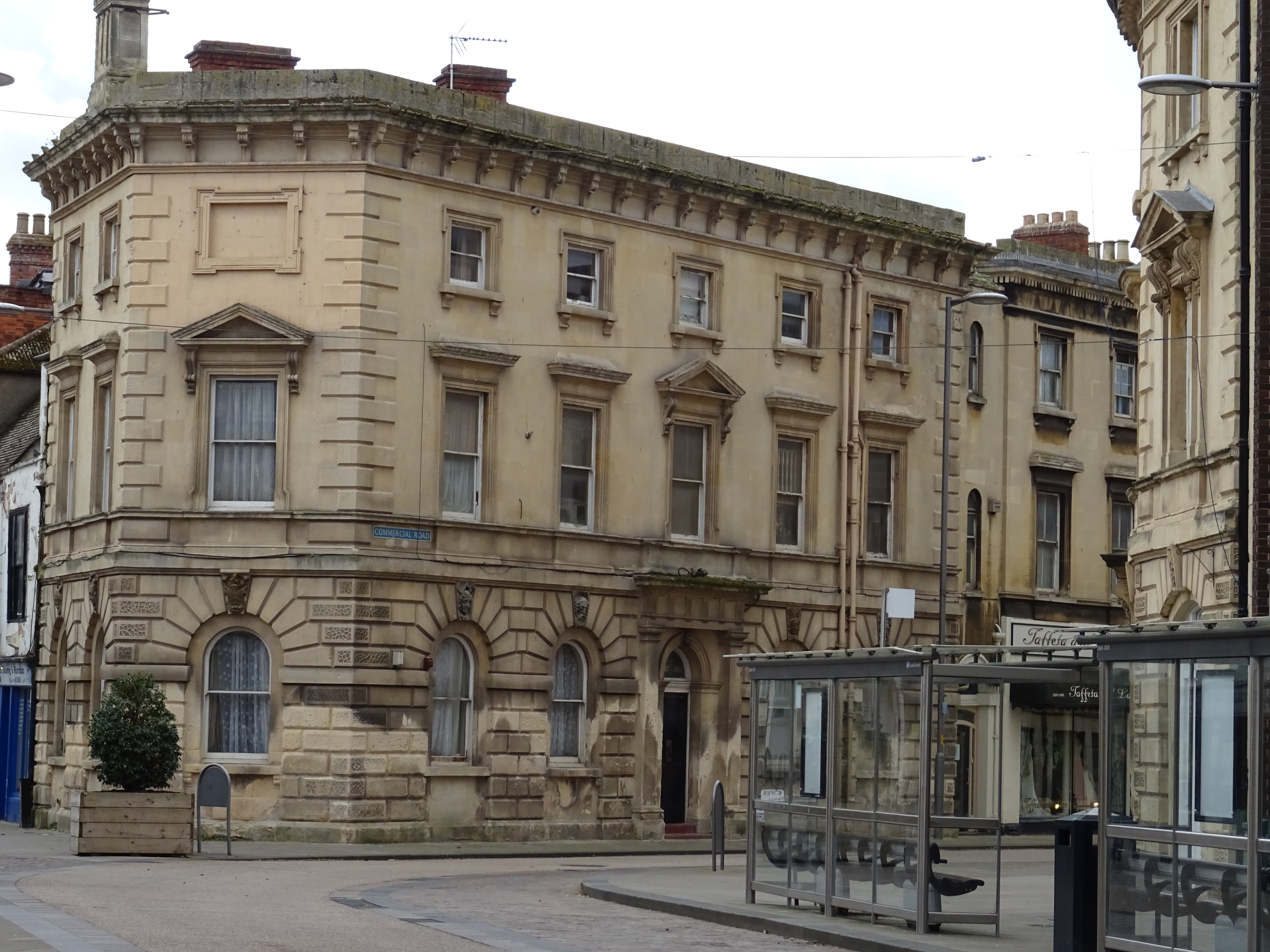
1 Commercial Road

Commercial Road contains a number of listed buildings:

=== North side ===
- Gloucester Prison Governor's House
- Black Swan Hotel

=== South side ===
- Dock Company Office
- City Flour Mills
- Soldiers of Gloucestershire Museum, formerly the Customs House
- 27 and 29 Northgate Street
- Navigation House
- Criterion Hotel
- 3 Commercial Road
- 1 Commercial Road

== See also ==
- Thomas Talbot (bottler)
