= The Tall Ship, Gloucester =

Pub in Gloucester, Gloucestershire, England

Tall Ships
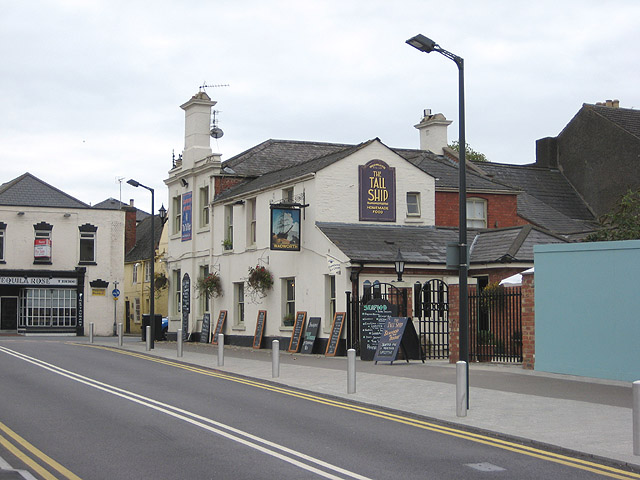
- Back of the Tall Ship from Gloucester Docks

General information
- Coordinates: 51.8616858°N 2.2524473°W
- Completed: 1870 (approx.)

The Tall Ship is a Grade II listed building at 134 Southgate Street, Gloucester. It is located at the entrance to Gloucester Docks. It became a listed building on 15 December 1998.

== History ==
The building was purpose built as a pub in the mid to late 19th century. Originally it was named the British Flag. The name was changed to the Tall Ships in the 1980s.

Red Oak Taverns took over the lease for the pub in April 2021, from Wadworths the former leaseholders. The building underwent a major refurbishment in the same year.

== Architecture ==
The pub is a two-storey italianate style building with a cellar. It is built on the corner of the entrance to the Docks. It has north and east facing sides and it is angled at the corner where the main entrance is located. The walls consist of stuccoed brick with stone details. It has a slate roof with two chimney stacks stuccoed in the same style as the walls. The north and east fronts have offset plinths, a raised band at the first-floor level and at the top a moulded crowning cornice with parapet above. The corner entrance doorway is framed by a moulded architrave with a carved key stone in the lintel and pilasters with moulded brackets supporting a cornice. Above this doorway is the sign for the public house, which conceals a window behind it, this is framed by decorative pilasters. On the parapet over the corner is a wrought-iron frame with decorative brackets and cresting. The east front on Southgate Street has a secondary entrance door and two sash windows on the ground floor, then 3 sash windows on the upper floor. The windows all have plain stone frames with projecting and raised key stones in the lintels and projecting stone sills. The north side has two sash windows on both floors, in the same style as the east side, and is the further extended by a wing to the rear. The wing has three sash windows on each floor in a similar style but with plain lintels. The windows in the wing are irregularly spaced. On the north side is one of the chimney stacks capped by a moulded cornice, the other chimney stack is on the south side.
