= Thomas Talbot (bottler) =

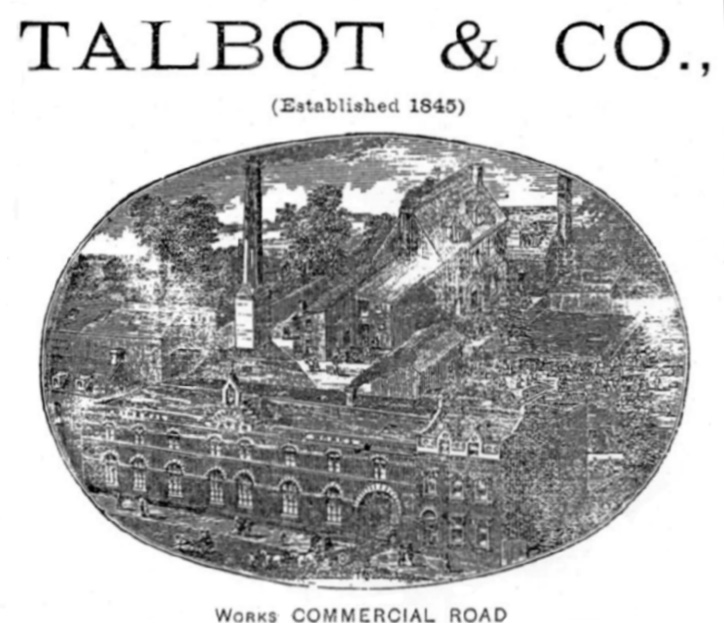
Image of the Talbot & Co. works on Commercial Road, Gloucester.

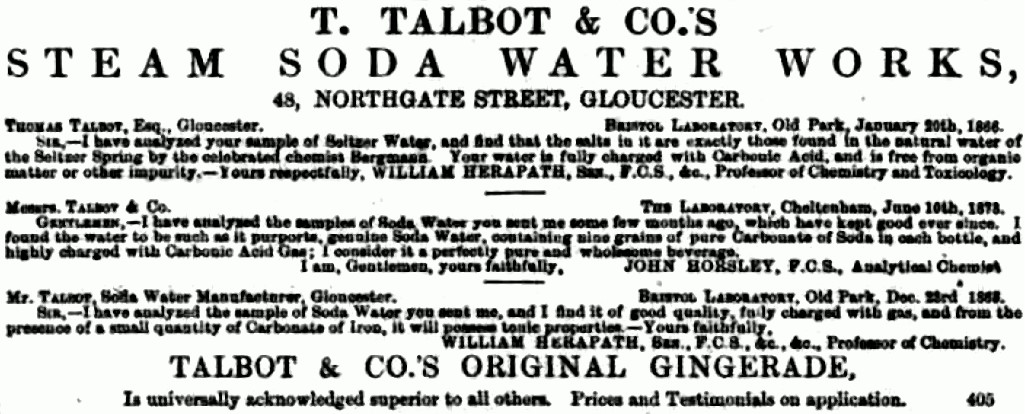
Thomas Talbot advert, Gloucester Journal, 1874.

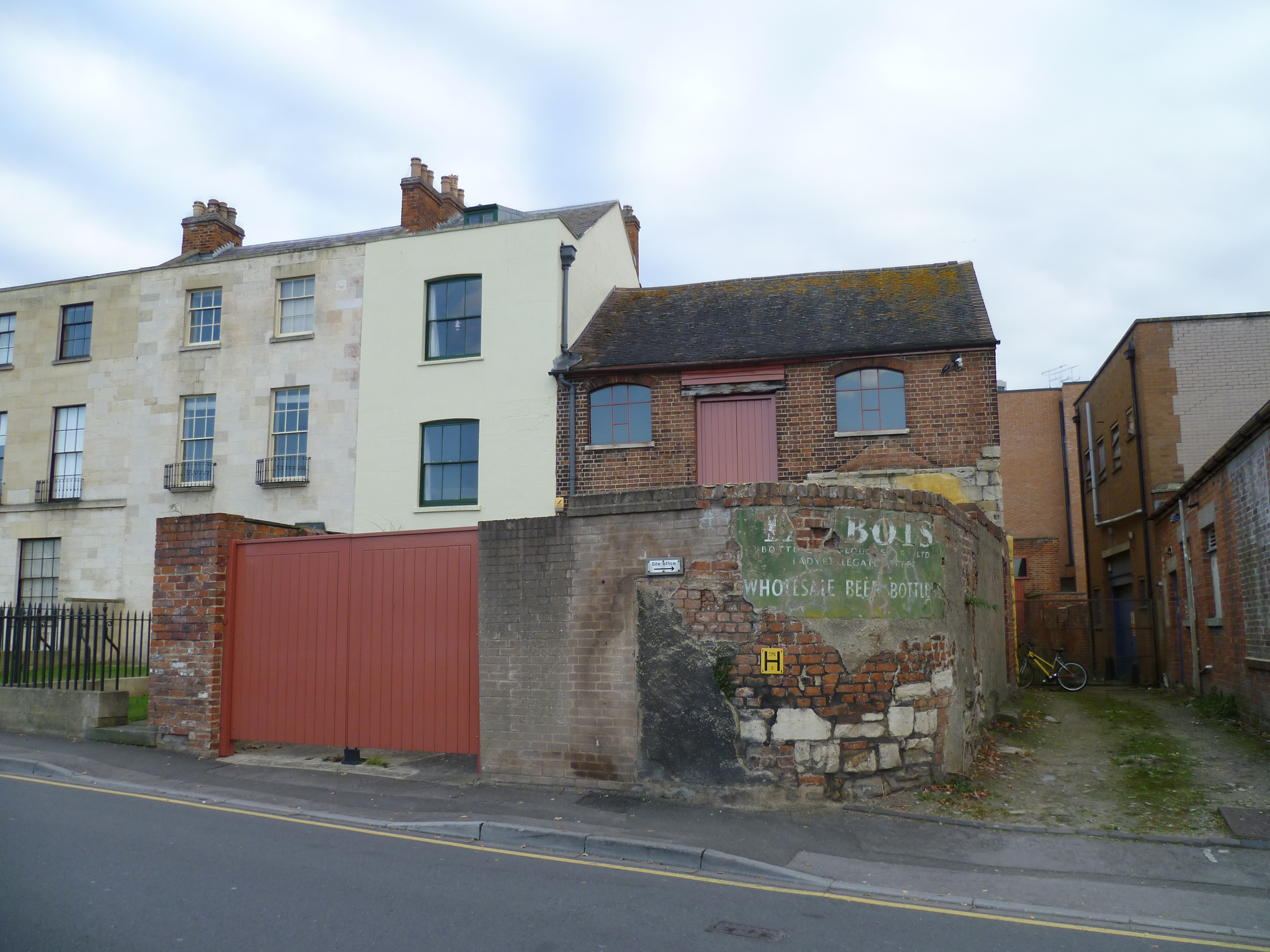
Former premises of Talbots Bottlers, Ladybellegate Street, Gloucester, 2015.

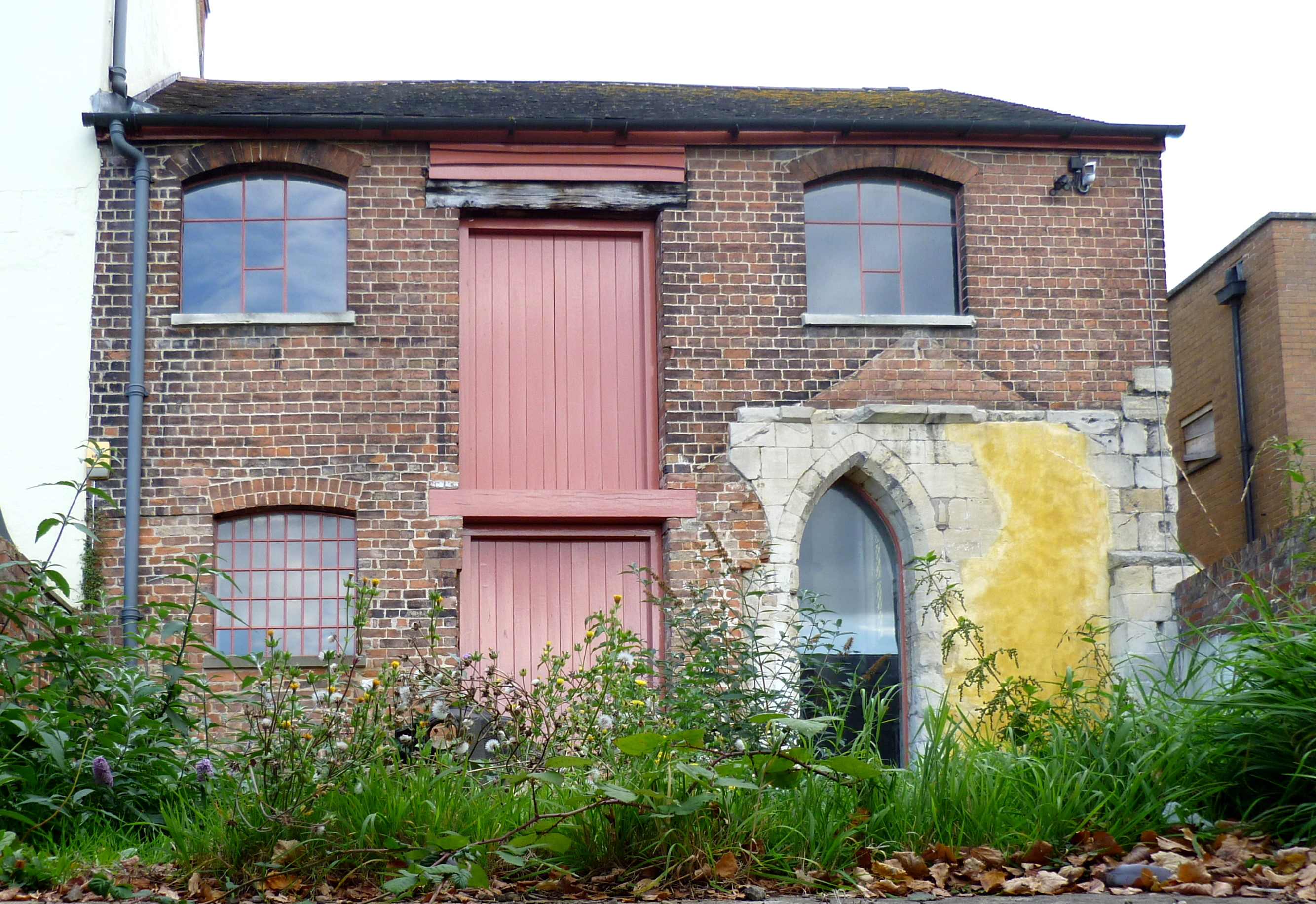
Former Talbots Bottlers premises, incorporating remains of Blackfriars on the right.

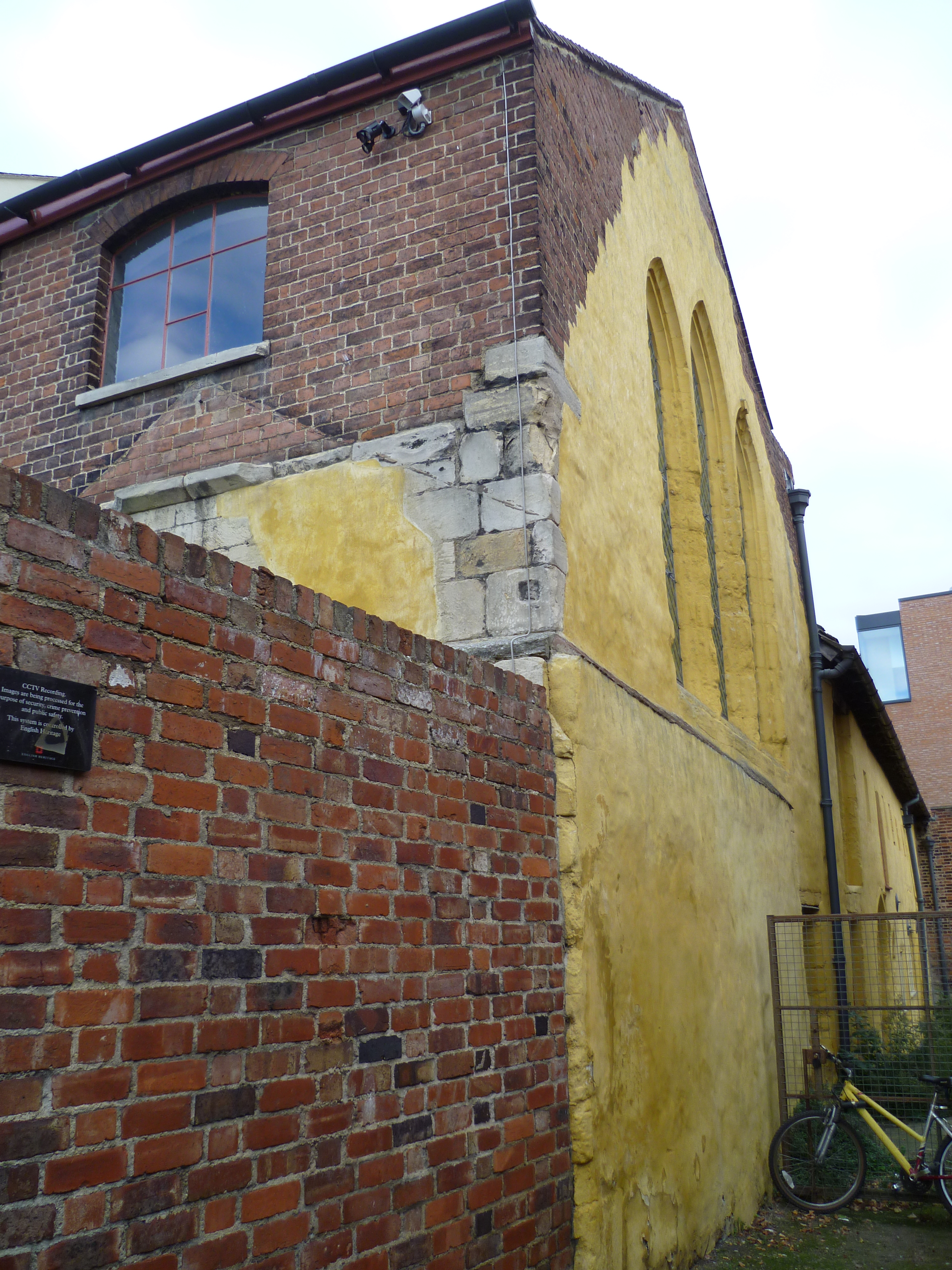
Blackfriars buildings formerly used by Talbots.

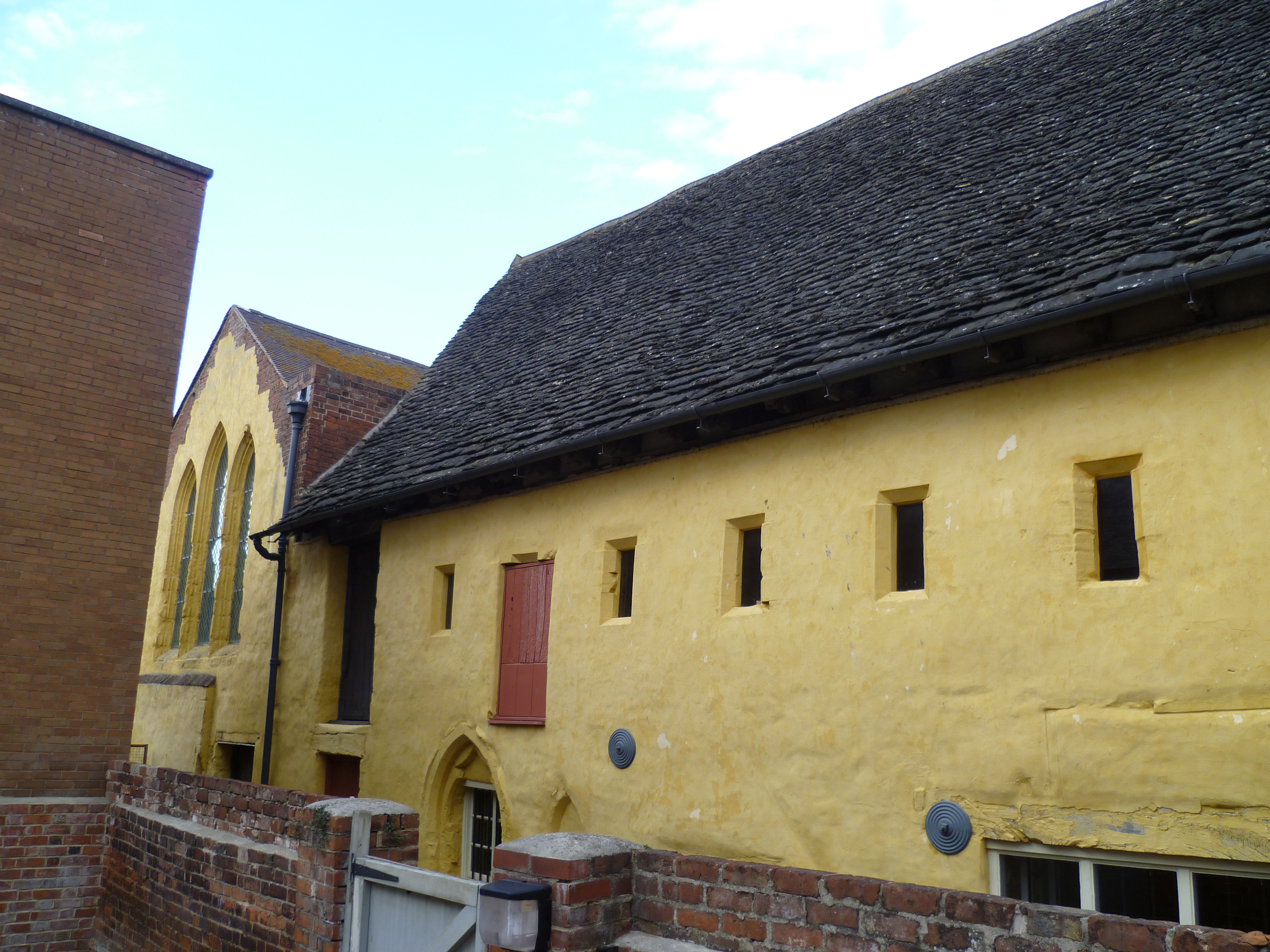
Blackfriars buildings formerly used by Talbots.

Thomas Talbot (1819 – 14 February 1891) was a beverage bottler of Gloucester who founded the Talbot Mineral Water Company in 1845. In 1886, he was elected high sheriff of Gloucester and later became an alderman of the city.

== Early life and family ==
Thomas Talbot was born in Portsea, Hampshire, in 1819 to Thomas and Maria Talbot. He had a sister Eliza who became a governess. He married Ann Ratcliffe Buston or Burton in Gloucester in 1845. In the 1851 census he was shown as a "Soda water manufacturer and grocer" at 45 Lower Northgate Street. He had daughters Amelia and Ann, and sons Thomas and Edward. In the 1881 census he was shown as a "Mineral Water Manufacturer Master Employ 9 Men 4 Boys" residing at 4 Commercial Road.

== Talbots Bottlers ==
Talbot founded the Talbot Mineral Water Company in 1845. The firm had premises in Ladybellegate Street from at least 1867 and occupied some of the buildings of the former Blackfriars monastery and built some new buildings along Commercial Road. In 1873 the firm also had premises at 48 Northgate Street. It later became Talbot Bottlers (Gloucester) Limited.

Apart from mineral water, the firm produced seltzer water, potass water, lemonade, soda water, ginger ale, magnesia water, aerated lime juice, lithia water, quinine tonic water and orange champagne. Later they began to bottle alcoholic drinks, included beer and cider for Bass and Worthington.

In 1959 they had offices in Westgate Street. Archaeological investigations of the Ladybellegate site were carried out after 2000 in connection with proposals to redevelop adjacent buildings. The site is now in the ownership of Historic England.

== City of Gloucester ==
In 1881, Talbot was president of The Gloucester Fish and Game Supply Society Limited. In 1884, he successfully stood for election in the east ward of the City of Gloucester. He was of a Conservative disposition. In November 1886, he was elected high sheriff of the city and served for one year. In November 1888, he was elected for one year an alderman of Gloucester. He was a sidesman of St Mary de Crypt Church.

== Death ==
Talbot died on 14 February 1891. He had been in ill health for some time. The immediate cause of his death was chronic asthma and bronchitis.
