= Commercial Road Primary School =

Coordinates: 38°14′18″S 146°24′02″E

Location
- Gippsland; Morwell, Victoria; Australia

Information
- School type: Primary

The Commercial Road Primary School is located on the main road in Morwell, Victoria, Australia. It was founded in 1879, and has undergone a number of changes over the years.

== History ==
Morwell State School No. 2136 was opened on Thursday, 4 April 1879 on land off Tarwin Street. A permanent location where the school is currently found became the site for a new building in August 1880. The campus contained the school and a residence for the head teacher. At that time George Street separated the grounds from the Church of England, where St. Mary's church was built in 1886. Around 1960, George Street was closed at Chapel Street and the old church was incorporated into the school grounds. In 1906, the original structure was replaced by a brick building.

From 1946 to 1962, a number of additional buildings were added and others removed. At its height, the school boasted an enrolment of more than 700 children. The opening of other schools—Collins Street (1951), Tobruk Street (1954), Crinigan Road (1957) and Morwell Park (1969)—alleviated overcrowding. In 1992 the Collins Street school closed, and many families and resources were transferred to Commercial Road.

A Japanese school was established at Commercial Road Primary School in 1983 for the children of technologists from Japan, who were in the region working on a project to convert brown coal to oil. The school was closed in 1991 when the project was completed.
