= Southgate Street =

Ancient street in Gloucester, England

Coordinates: 51.8625°N 2.2495°W

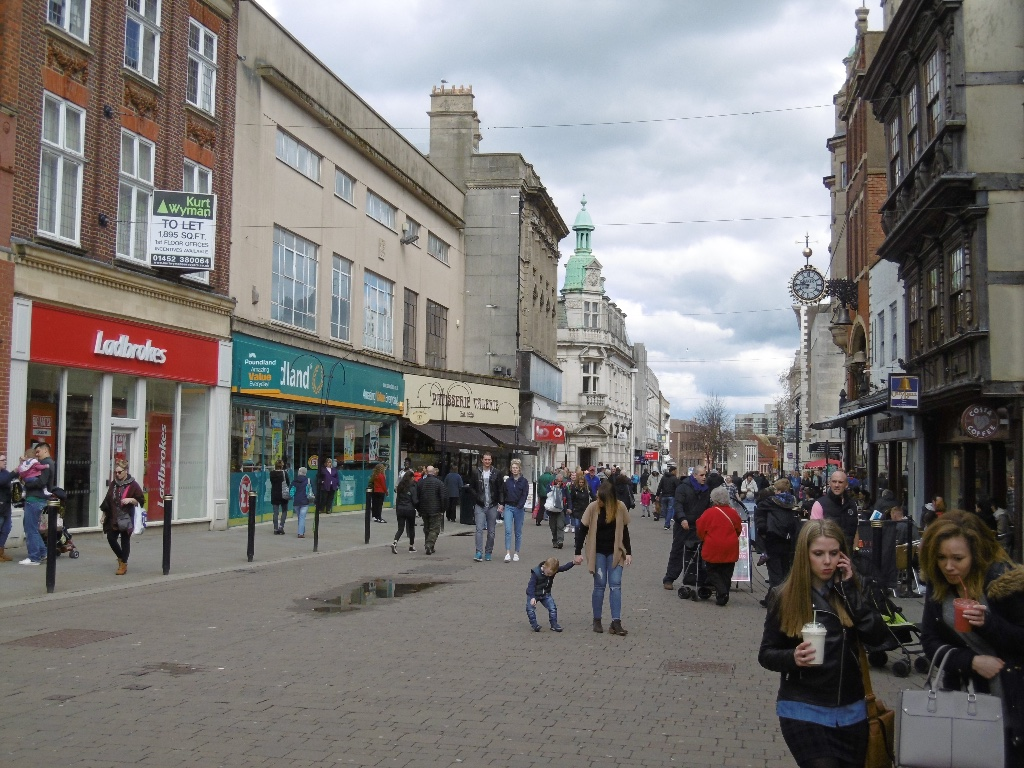
Southgate Street in 2016

Southgate Street is one of the ancient streets in the City of Gloucester, so named because its southern end was originally the location of the south gate in the city's walls. The part beyond the gate as far as Severn Street was sometimes known as Lower Southgate Street. It runs from the crossroads of Northgate, Eastgate, Southgate, and Westgate Streets in the north (The Cross) to Bristol Road in the south.

== History ==
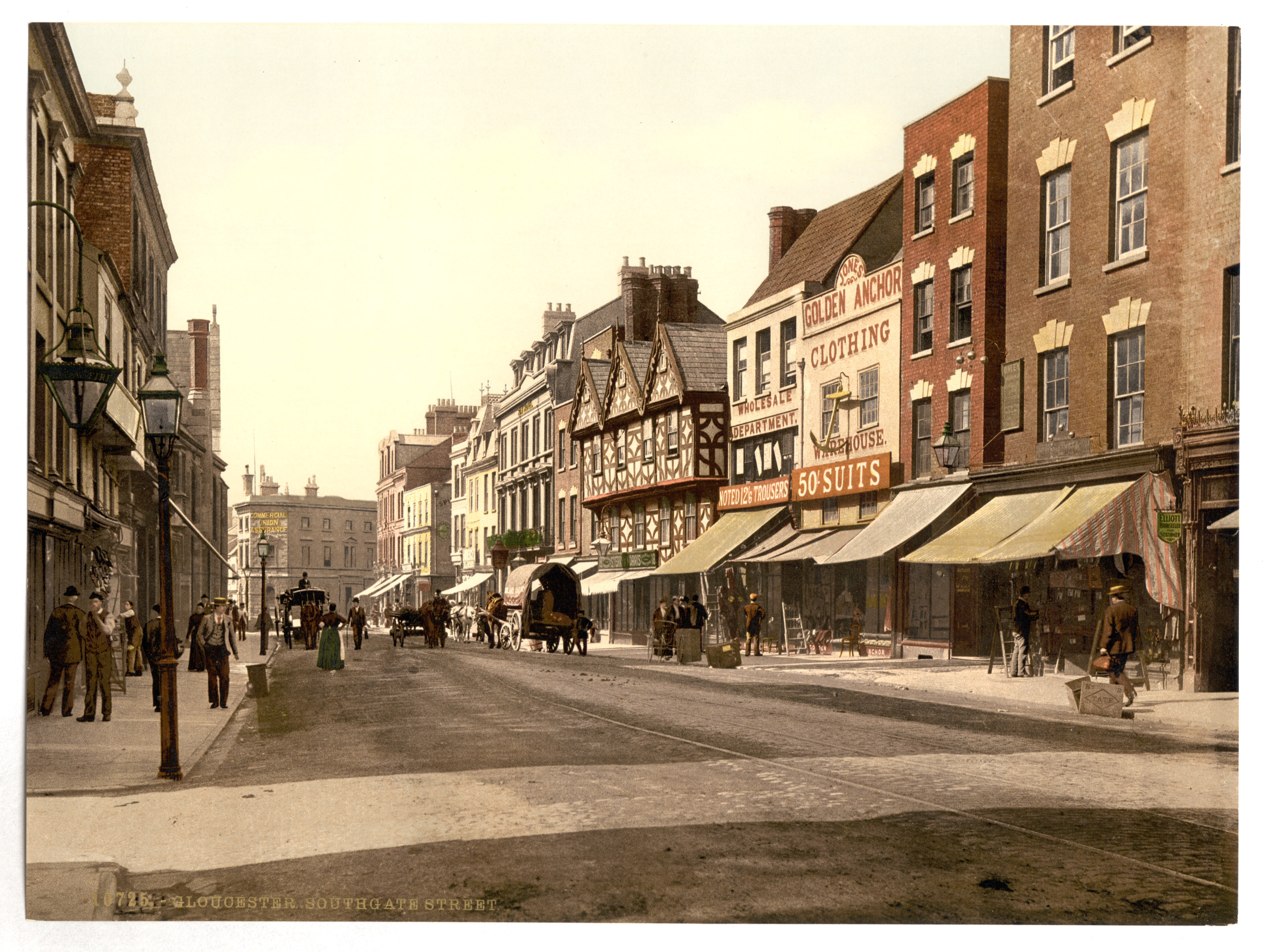
Southgate Street looking south from The Cross, c. 1890s.

The street dates from at least 1500 when the southern gate in the city's defences was approximately where Commercial Road meets Southgate Street today.

== Listed buildings and structures ==
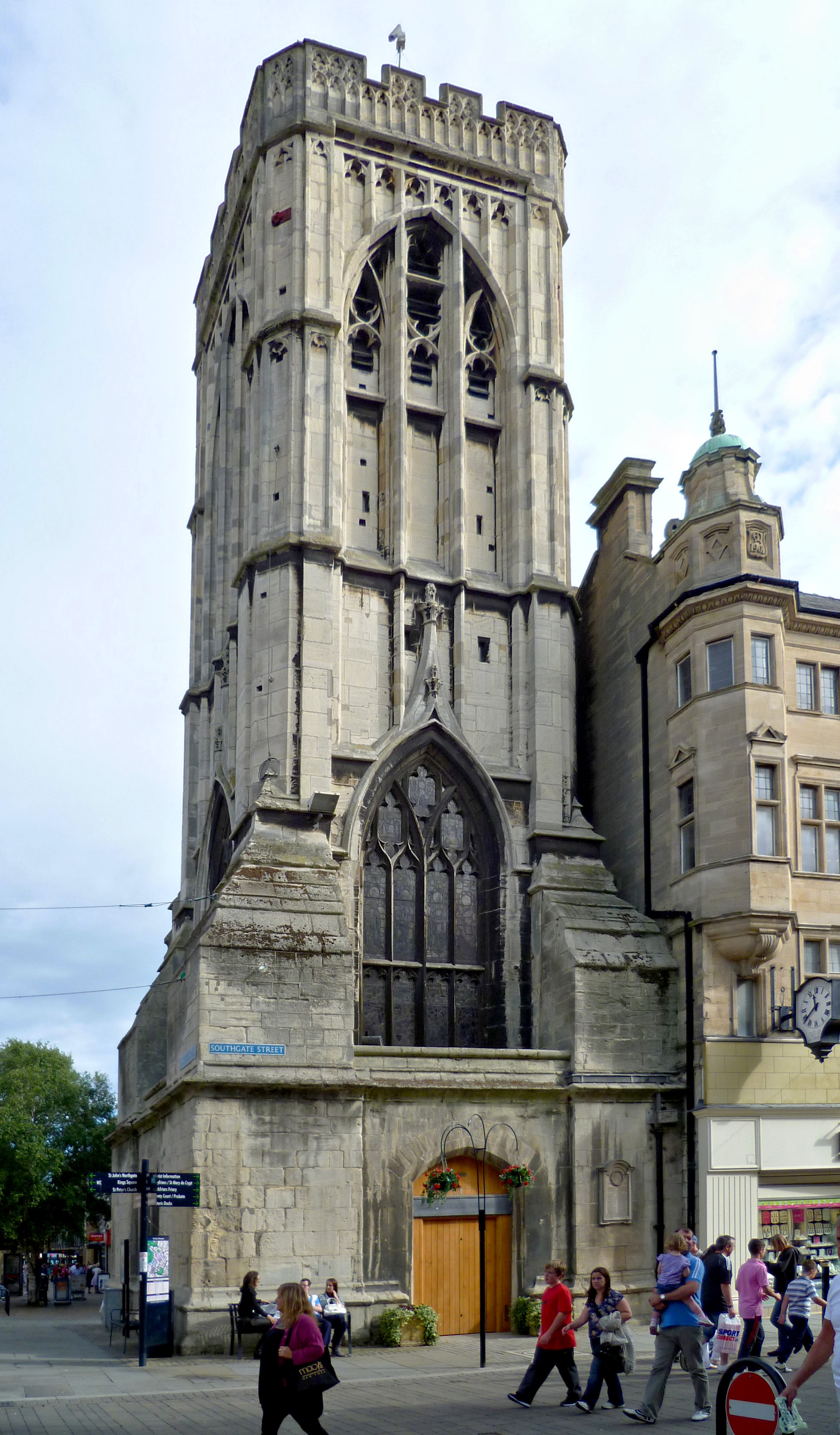
St Michael's Tower

Listed buildings and structures in Southgate Street, north to south, are:

=== East side ===
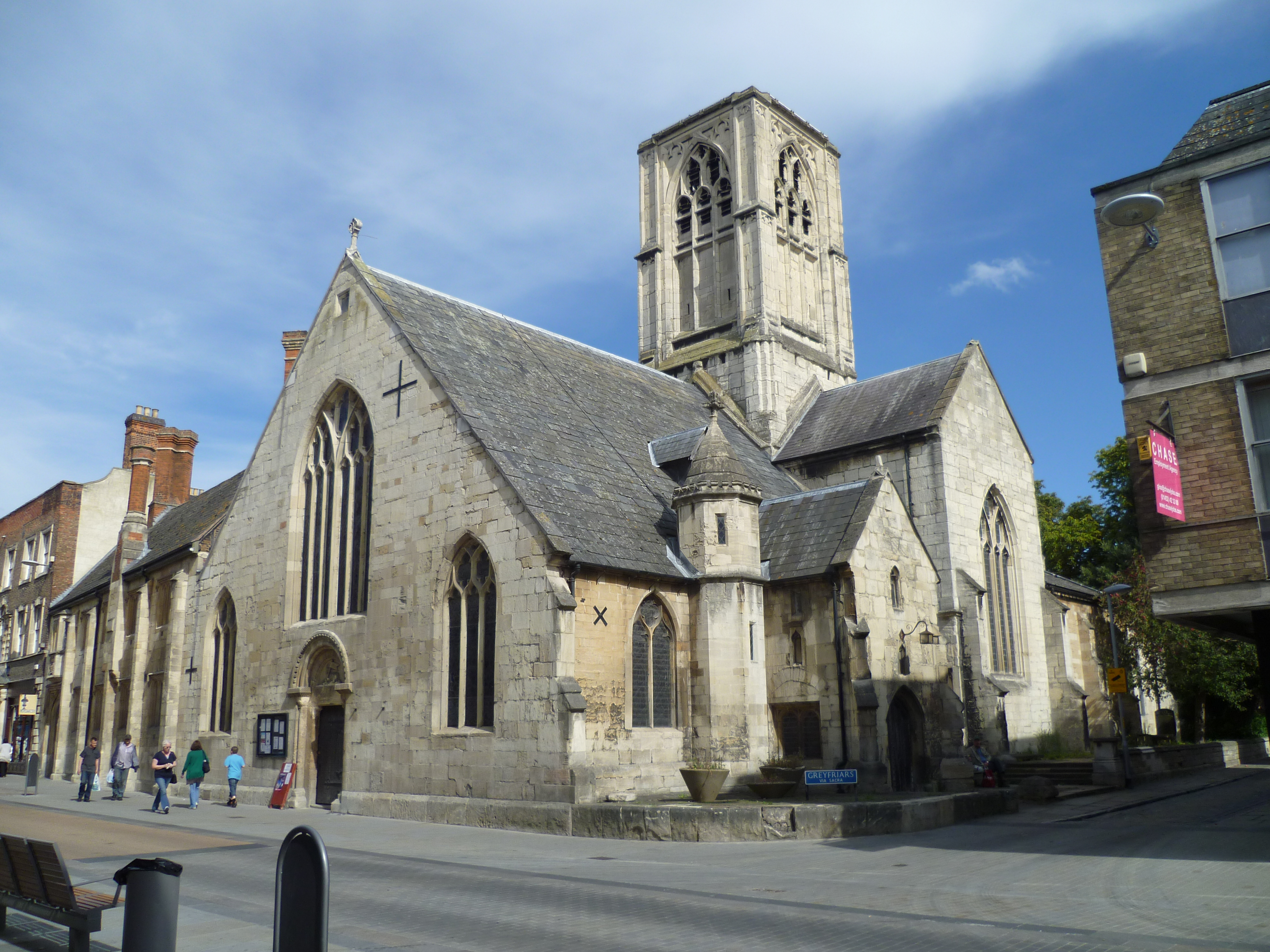
St Mary de Crypt Church

- St Michael's Tower
- 5 Southgate Street
- 9 and 9A Southgate Street
- 27 Southgate Street
- 29 and 31 Southgate Street
- Former St Mary de Crypt School
- St Mary de Crypt Church
- 35 Southgate Street
- Copner House
- 53 Southgate Street
- 55 and 57 Southgate Street
- 59 Southgate Street
- 61 Southgate Street
- Albion House, formerly the Albion Hotel, designed by Thomas Fulljames.
- K6 Telephone kiosk
- The Whitesmith's Arms
- 83 and 85 Southgate Street
- 105 Southgate Street
- 107 Southgate Street
- 109 Southgate Street
- 111 Southgate Street
- 113 and 115 Southgate Street
- 117 and 119 Southgate Street
- 2 Spa Road (on the corner with Southgate Street)
- Spalite Hotel
- 123-131 Southgate Street
- 133 and 135 Southgate Street
- 137 Southgate Street
- 139 and 141 Southgate Street
- 143-151 Southgate Street
- 155 and 157 Southgate Street

=== West side ===
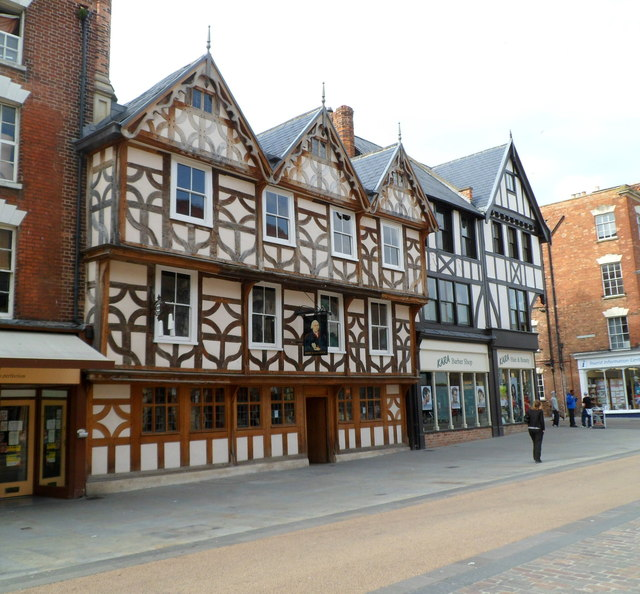
Robert Raikes' House

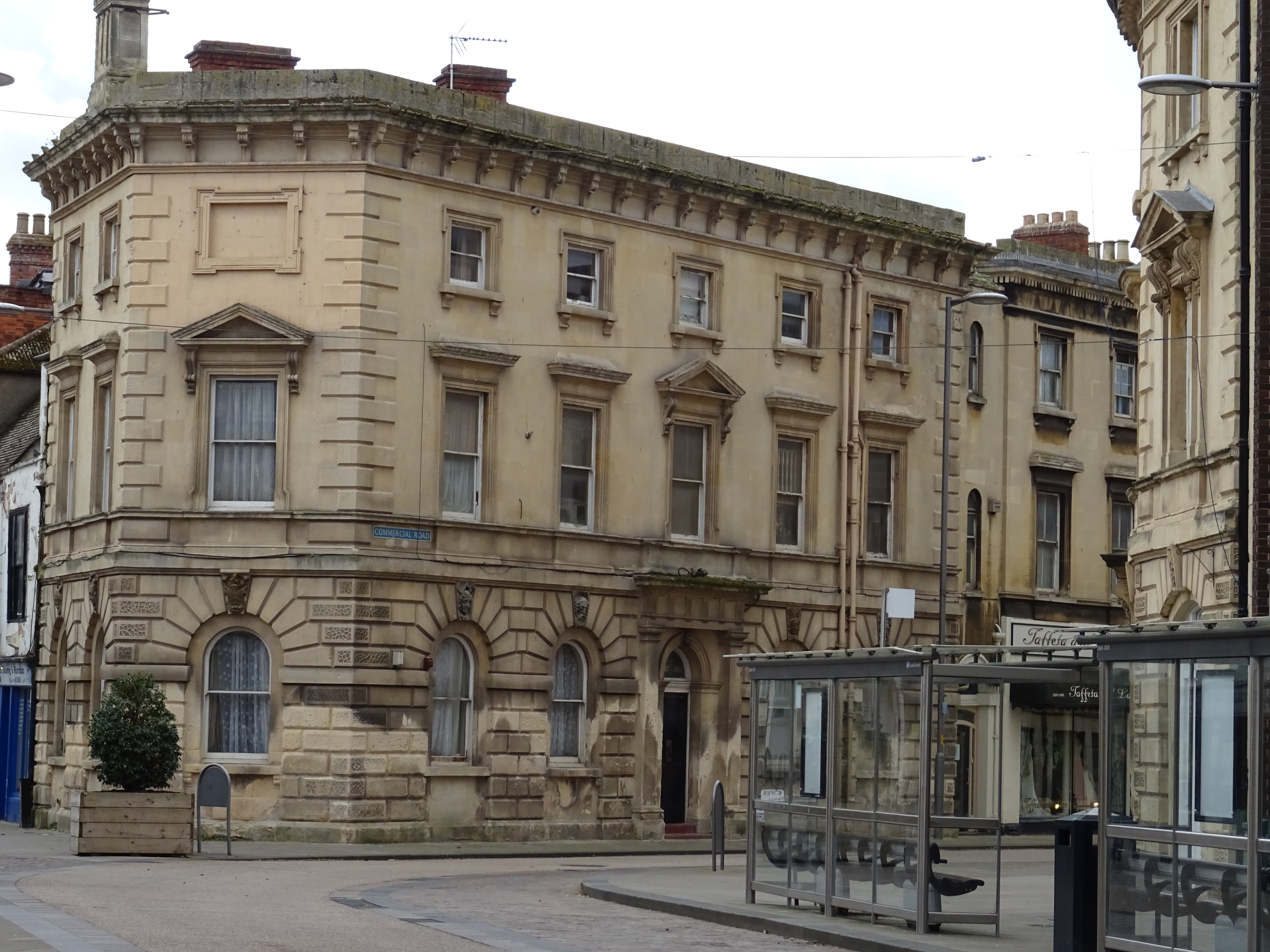
1 Commercial Road

- 12 and 14 Southgate Street
- 16 and 18 Southgate Street
- 24, 24A and 26 Southgate Street
- 28 Southgate Street
- Robert Raikes' House
- 40 Southgate Street
- 42 Southgate Street
- New County Hotel
- Black Swan Hotel
- 1 Commercial Road
- 74 Southgate Street
- 76 Southgate Street
- 78 Southgate Street
- Weighbridge House
- The Tall Ships Public House
- 140 and 142 Southgate Street
- 172 Southgate Street
- 182 and 184 Southgate Street

== See also ==
- High Orchard
