= Grade II* listed buildings in Gloucester =

There are over 20,000 Grade II* listed buildings in England. This page is a list of these buildings in the district of Gloucester in Gloucestershire.

== Gloucester ==
Name	Location	Type	Completed (Note: The date given is the date used by Historic England as significant for the initial building or that of an important part in the structure's description.)	Date designated	Grid ref. (Note: Sometimes known as OSGB36, the grid reference is based on the British national grid reference system used by the Ordnance Survey.) Geo-coordinates	Entry number (Note: The "List Entry Number" is a unique number assigned to each listed building and scheduled monument by Historic England.)	Image
Church of St James	Quedgeley, Gloucester	Parish Church	14th century	10 January 1955	SO8071614182; 51°49′33″N 2°16′52″W	1090771	Church of St James More images
Bearland House and attached Railings and Gates to Forecourt	Gloucester	House	Late 17th century or Early 18th century	7 September 1970	SO8293918570; 51°51′56″N 2°14′57″W	1245728	Bearland House and attached Railings and Gates to Forecourt More images
Bearland Lodge	Gloucester	Town House	c. 1720	23 January 1952	SO8295718563; 51°51′55″N 2°14′56″W	1245727	Bearland Lodge More images
Boundary Wall to North West Corner of Friary Site, Blackfriars	Gloucester	Boundary Wall	1540–1545	12 March 1973	SO8294918461; 51°51′52″N 2°14′56″W	1245990	Boundary Wall to North West Corner of Friary Site, Blackfriars More images
Central Block to HM Prison	Gloucester	Prison	1784–1790	12 March 1973	SO8281318525; 51°51′54″N 2°15′04″W	1245474	Central Block to HM Prison More images
Chapel of St Mary Magdalene Remains of Chapel of St Mary Magdalene	Gloucester	Chapel	Mid 12th century	23 January 1952	SO8432318988; 51°52′09″N 2°13′45″W	1245744	Chapel of St Mary Magdalene Remains of Chapel of St Mary Magdalene More images
Church of St Barnabas	Tuffley, Gloucester	Parish Church	1938–1940	9 March 1982	SO8339215808; 51°50′26″N 2°14′33″W	1271790	Church of St Barnabas More images
Church of St John, Northgate	Gloucester	Methodist Chapel	1972	23 January 1952	SO8324318683; 51°51′59″N 2°14′41″W	1245673	Church of St John, Northgate More images
Church of St Lawrence	Barnwood, Gloucester	Parish Church	Mid 12th century	10 January 1955	SO8584117755; 51°51′30″N 2°12′25″W	1271586	Church of St Lawrence More images
Church of St Swithun	Hempsted, Gloucester	Parish Church	14th century	10 January 1955	SO8135917034; 51°51′06″N 2°16′19″W	1271743	Church of St Swithun More images
Deaf Institute	Gloucester	Town House	c. 1690	23 January 1952	SO8294618856; 51°52′05″N 2°14′57″W	1245666	Deaf Institute
Dulverton House (Kings School)	Gloucester	Abbey	13th century	23 January 1952	SO8317018847; 51°52′05″N 2°14′45″W	1245957	Dulverton House (Kings School) More images
Folk Museum	Gloucester	Jettied House	c. 1645	23 January 1952	SO8286218771; 51°52′02″N 2°15′01″W	1245075	Folk Museum More images
Folk Museum (Bishop Hooper's Lodging)	Gloucester	Jettied House	c. 1520	23 January 1952	SO8287118765; 51°52′02″N 2°15′01″W	1245071	Folk Museum (Bishop Hooper's Lodging) More images
Horton Road Hospital including Area Railings	Gloucester	Fireproof Building	1814–1823	28 May 1991	SO8438318527; 51°51′54″N 2°13′42″W	1271680	Horton Road Hospital including Area Railings More images
Kings Board, Hillfield Gardens	Gloucester	Gazebo	Late 18th century	23 January 1952	SO8425618976; 51°52′09″N 2°13′48″W	1245719	Kings Board, Hillfield Gardens More images
King Edward's Gate	Gloucester	House	1998	23 January 1952	SO8303118732; 51°52′01″N 2°14′52″W	1245909	King Edward's Gate More images
Kings School and Remains of Abbots Lodging	Gloucester	Bishops Palace	1541	12 March 1973	SO8311518902; 51°52′06″N 2°14′48″W	1245960	Kings School and Remains of Abbots Lodging More images
Northgate House and attached Walls and Railings to Forecourt	Gloucester	House	Mid to late 17th century	23 January 1952	SO8361018804; 51°52′03″N 2°14′22″W	1271700	Northgate House and attached Walls and Railings to Forecourt More images
20, College Green and part of Abbey Precinct Wall	Gloucester	House	18th century	12 March 1973	SO8310918694; 51°52′00″N 2°14′48″W	1245904	20, College Green and part of Abbey Precinct Wall More images
Robert Raikes' House	Gloucester	House	19th century	23 January 1952	SO8306918463; 51°51′52″N 2°14′50″W	1271757	Robert Raikes' House More images
Roman Catholic Church of St Peter	Gloucester	Roman Catholic Church	1860–1868	12 March 1973	SO8351218781; 51°52′02″N 2°14′27″W	1245721	Roman Catholic Church of St Peter More images
Scriven's Conduit	Gloucester	Conduit Head	1636	25 January 1952	SO8422418971; 51°52′09″N 2°13′50″W	1245720	Scriven's Conduit More images
Selwyn Care Home and attached Wall	Matson, Gloucester	Manor House	c. 1575	23 January 1952	SO8481515463; 51°50′15″N 2°13′18″W	1245730	Selwyn Care Home and attached Wall
Sherborne House	Gloucester	House	c. 1825	25 January 1952	SO8296817989; 51°51′37″N 2°14′55″W	1245621	Sherborne House
St Margarets Chapel	Gloucester	Chapel	Before 1163	23 January 1952	SO8411418909; 51°52′07″N 2°13′56″W	1245723	St Margarets Chapel More images
St Mary De Crypt Grammar School	Gloucester	Church Hall	1862	23 January 1952	SO8308118439; 51°51′51″N 2°14′50″W	1271755	St Mary De Crypt Grammar School More images
The Deanery and attached Forecourt Walls and Railings	Gloucester	House	1731–1741	23 January 1952	SO8303718882; 51°52′06″N 2°14′52″W	1271712	The Deanery and attached Forecourt Walls and Railings More images
The Judges Lodgings and attached Front Piers Walls and Balustrades	Gloucester	Apartment	1998	25 January 1952	SO8299617975; 51°51′36″N 2°14′54″W	1245622	The Judges Lodgings and attached Front Piers Walls and Balustrades More images
Tower of the former Church of St Michael	Gloucester	Parish Church	1455–1472	23 January 1952	SO8317018541; 51°51′55″N 2°14′45″W	1245822	Tower of the former Church of St Michael More images
Village Cross (at Corner of Rea Lane)	Hempsted, Gloucester	Village Cross	Early 15th century	10 January 1955	SO8146716949; 51°51′03″N 2°16′14″W	1271745	Village Cross (at Corner of Rea Lane) More images
Well Cross in Robins Wood Hill Country Park at SO 838 158	Gloucester	Cistern	12th century or 13th century	15 December 1998	SO8387015848; 51°50′28″N 2°14′08″W	1245660	Well Cross in Robins Wood Hill Country Park at SO 838 158
Winston Hall	Gloucester	Town House	1750	23 January 1952	SO8323818375; 51°51′49″N 2°14′41″W	1271655	Winston Hall More images
House (6, Westgate Street)	Gloucester	House	16th century	12 March 1973	SO8315318590; 51°51′56″N 2°14′46″W	1245438	House (6, Westgate Street)
House (14 Westgate Street)	Gloucester	House	Early to Mid 18th century	23 January 1952	SO8313918607; 51°51′57″N 2°14′47″W	1245445	House (14 Westgate Street)
House (33, Westgate Street)	Gloucester	House	C20	12 March 1973	SO8307618626; 51°51′57″N 2°14′50″W	1271925	House (33, Westgate Street)
47 and 49, Westgate Street	Gloucester	House	Late 18th century	23 January 1952	SO8304518649; 51°51′58″N 2°14′52″W	1271930	47 and 49, Westgate Street More images
66, Westgate Street	Gloucester	Shop	19th century	23 January 1952	SO8300418708; 51°52′00″N 2°14′54″W	1245228	66, Westgate Street More images
House (74 and 76, Westgate Street)	Gloucester	House	After Early 16th century	10 December 1973	SO8298618725; 51°52′01″N 2°14′55″W	1245230	House (74 and 76, Westgate Street) More images
House (1 and 3, Berkeley Street/56 and 61, Westgate Street)	Gloucester	House	C20	23 January 1952	SO8301918662; 51°51′59″N 2°14′53″W	1245225	House (1 and 3, Berkeley Street/56 and 61, Westgate Street) More images
14, College Green	Gloucester	House	Early 15th century	23 January 1952	SO8300318854; 51°52′05″N 2°14′54″W	1245896	14, College Green More images
9, College Green	Gloucester	House	1708–1709	23 January 1952	SO8298918796; 51°52′03″N 2°14′54″W	1271600	9, College Green More images
House (29 and 31, Southgate Street)	Gloucester	House	C20	23 January 1952	SO8309618451; 51°51′52″N 2°14′49″W	1271754	House (29 and 31, Southgate Street) More images
House (5–11, College Street)	Gloucester	House	Later alterations	23 January 1952	SO8302318714; 51°52′00″N 2°14′53″W	1245908	House (5–11, College Street) More images
House (13, Ladybellegate Street)	Gloucester	House	c. 1540	23 January 1952	SO8294118428; 51°51′51″N 2°14′57″W	1245752	House (13, Ladybellegate Street)
House (15, Ladybellegate Street)	Gloucester	House	c. 1540	23 January 1952	SO8293818423; 51°51′51″N 2°14′57″W	1245753	House (15, Ladybellegate Street)
House (17, Ladybellegate Street)	Gloucester	House	c. 1540	23 January 1952	SO8293518418; 51°51′51″N 2°14′57″W	1245754	House (17, Ladybellegate Street)
3, Millers Green	Gloucester	Abbey	12th century	23 January 1952	SO8309618870; 51°52′05″N 2°14′49″W	1271714	3, Millers Green More images
12–18 Brunswick Square	Gloucester	Terrace	1825	23 January 1952	SO 8299618105; 51°51′41″N 2°14′53″W	1245974	12–18 Brunswick Square More images
War Memorial to the Royal Gloucestershire Hussars Yeomanry	College Green, Gloucester Cathedral, Gloucester	War memorial	20th century	15 December 1988	SO830188; 51°52′03″N 2°14′53″W	1245906	War Memorial to the Royal Gloucestershire Hussars Yeomanry More images
