= St. Michael's Tower =

St. Michael's Tower can refer to:

- St. Michael's Tower, Glastonbury, a landmark tower on Glastonbury Tor
- St Michael's Tower, Gloucester, a preserved church tower in Gloucester, England
- St Michael's Tower, Montacute, a folly tower in Montacute, Somerset
