= 333 Stroud Road =

Grade II listed building in Gloucester, England

Coordinates: 51°50′11″N 2°14′33″W

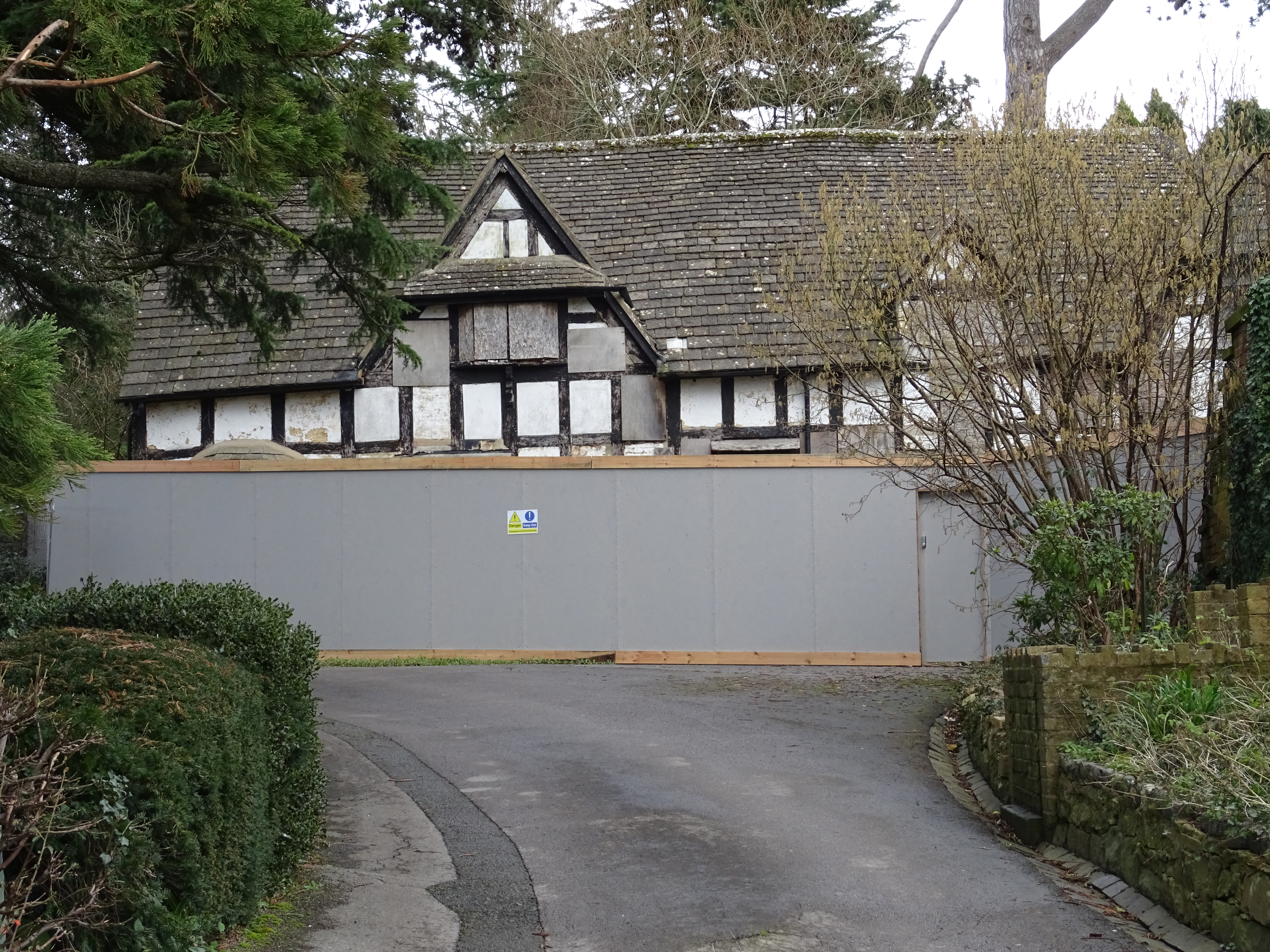
A photograph of 333 Stroud Road in February 2021

333 Stroud Road is a former farmhouse on Stroud Road, Tuffley, Gloucester. It became a Grade II listed building on 12 March 1973.

== History ==
It was built in the early 17th century.

During the 20th century, it was left abandoned for years. In November 2008, the buildings badly dilapidated state was discussed in a building environment meeting. It was agreed that this needed further investigation.

== Architecture ==
Though originally built as a farmhouse, the building has gone through several major renovations, being converted into several cottages and then back into one house.

The house has one storey and an attic. The original frame of the house consists of nogged timber, though brick dwarf walls were added in one of many renovations. The roof is made of stone slate.

A gabled dormer, reachable from the first floor, contains leadlight windows. Additionally, there is a cross-gable containing an oriel window, which has a stone-slate hood above it. The exterior doorways are also adorned with hoods.
