= Tuffley =

Suburb of Gloucester, England

Coordinates: 51.835048°N 2.256743°W

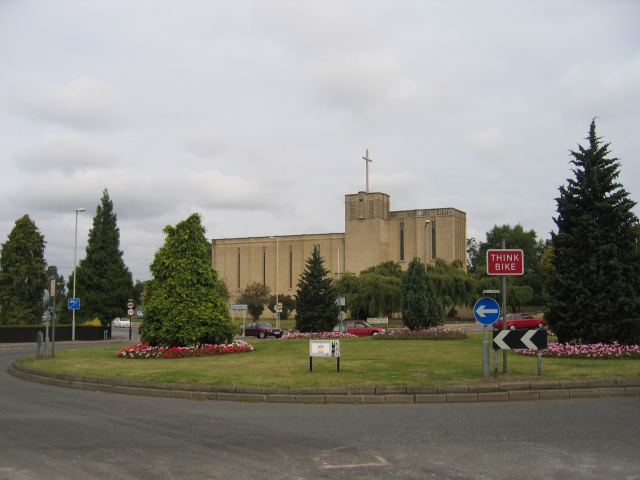
- St Barnabas's Church

- Location within Gloucestershire
- Population: 5,889 (2011, ward)
- OS grid reference: SO824151
  - London: 113m
- District: Gloucester; Stroud
- Shire county: Gloucestershire
- Region: South West
- Country: England
- Sovereign state: United Kingdom
- Post town: GLOUCESTER
- Postcode district: GL4
- Dialling code: 01452
- Police: Gloucestershire
- Fire: Gloucestershire
- Ambulance: South Western
- UK Parliament: Gloucester

Tuffley is a suburb in the city of Gloucester in Gloucestershire, England. The ward is unparished and situated near Robinswood Hill.

== Origins ==
Tuffley is a suburb of Gloucester, in the county of Gloucestershire. Recorded as Tuffley, Tufley, Tufly, Tuffel, Tuffill and possibly others, this suburb was once a village mentioned in the Domesday Book of 1086 as 'Tuffelege', which suggests a meaning of Tuffa's farm, with Tuffa being an Anglo-Saxon personal name. To this was added the suffix 'leah,' meaning a fenced enclosure or farm.

In 1891 the parish had a population of 872. On 9 November 1900 the parish was abolished and became part of Gloucester, Whaddon and Quedgeley.

In 1900, Lower Tuffley was moved into the parish of Quedgeley.

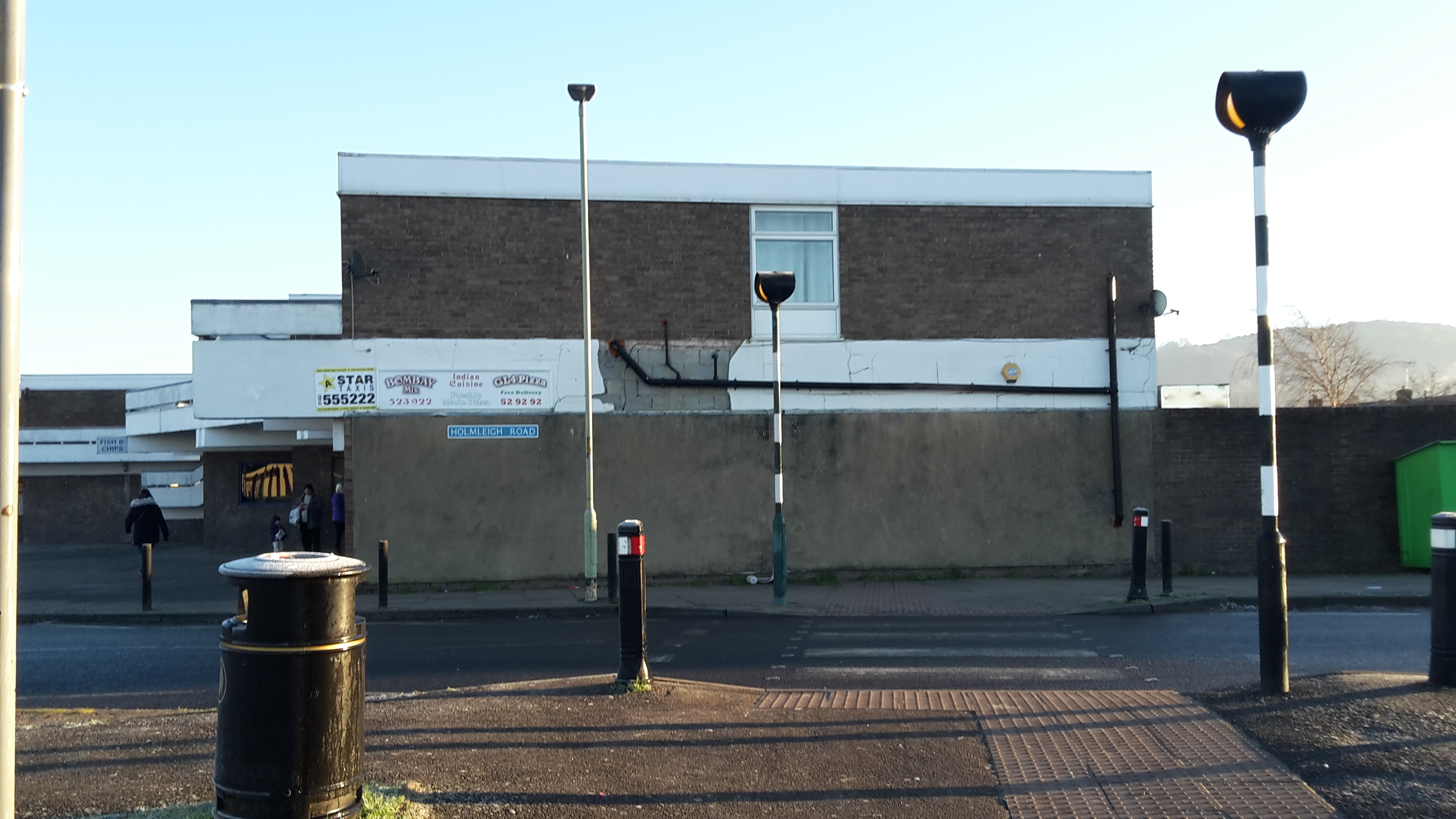
The side of Holmleigh Parade in January 2017

== Religion ==
Four local churches have a base in Tuffley: St George's (Church of England) is on Grange Road, Lower Tuffley and St Barnabas (Church of England) is on Stroud Road. The tower of St Barnabas is a local landmark. The Catholic church of the English Martyrs is on Tuffley Lane and the Grange Baptist Church (Baptist) is also on Grange Road.

== Amenities and transport ==
There are two public houses in the Tuffley area, the Pike and Musket and the Fox and Elm. There are two libraries, a community centre, a sports centre, and a shopping centre.

== Sport ==
Tuffley Rovers F.C., a football team based in the ward, were formed in 1929 and play at Glevum Park in Gloucester operating five Saturday adult sides, a veterans team and a full youth section. Their best result in the FA Cup was a 2nd qualifying round defeat in 1999–2000 to Lymington & New Milton, while they reached the 2nd round in the FA Vase in the 1994–95 season.

== 1963 aircraft incident ==
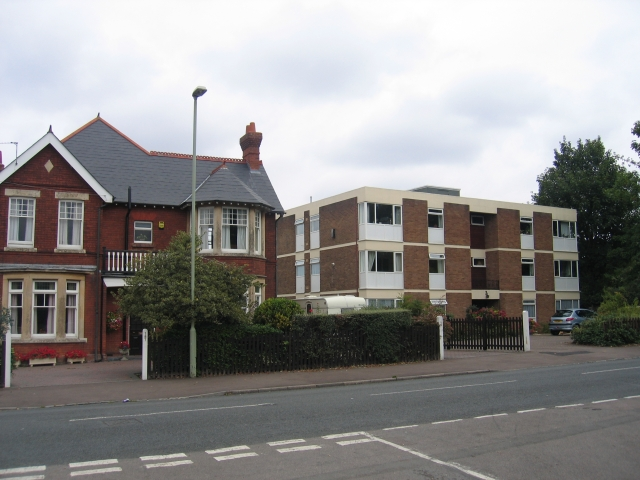
Site of 1963 crash

Vickers Varsity G-APAZ, of Smiths Aviation of Bishop's Cleeve, crashed on the morning of March 27 1963, and landed on top of a house on 189 Tuffley Avenue, known as 'Longmead'. The aircraft narrowly missed the Ribston Hall High School, a girls grammar school, by only feet.

Both pilots were killed

- 26 year old Kelston Thomas of Bristol, who was to marry 23 year old Margaret Clements of Failand on Saturday March 31 1963; he was living at Charlton Kings.
- 38 year old Russell Palmer of Up Hatherley, a former wartime bomber pilot. He was found strapped in his seat. He had attended Northgate Grammar School in Ipswich, and married Daphne Durrant in September 1951, with two sons.

The crash was caused by the accidentally switching off the fuel to an engine.
