= Longsmith Street =

Street in Gloucester, England

Coordinates: 51.8651°N 2.2481°W

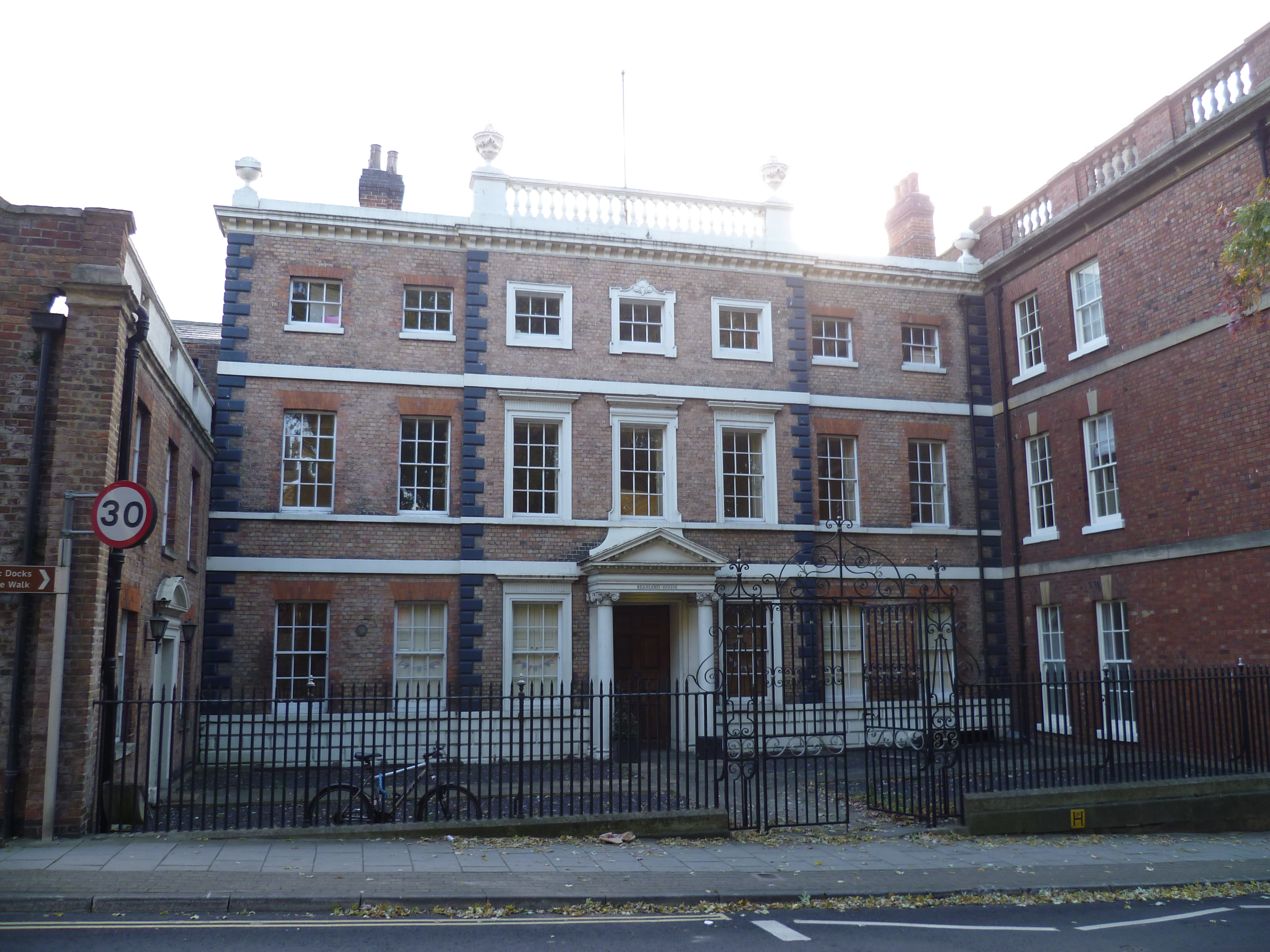
Bearland House

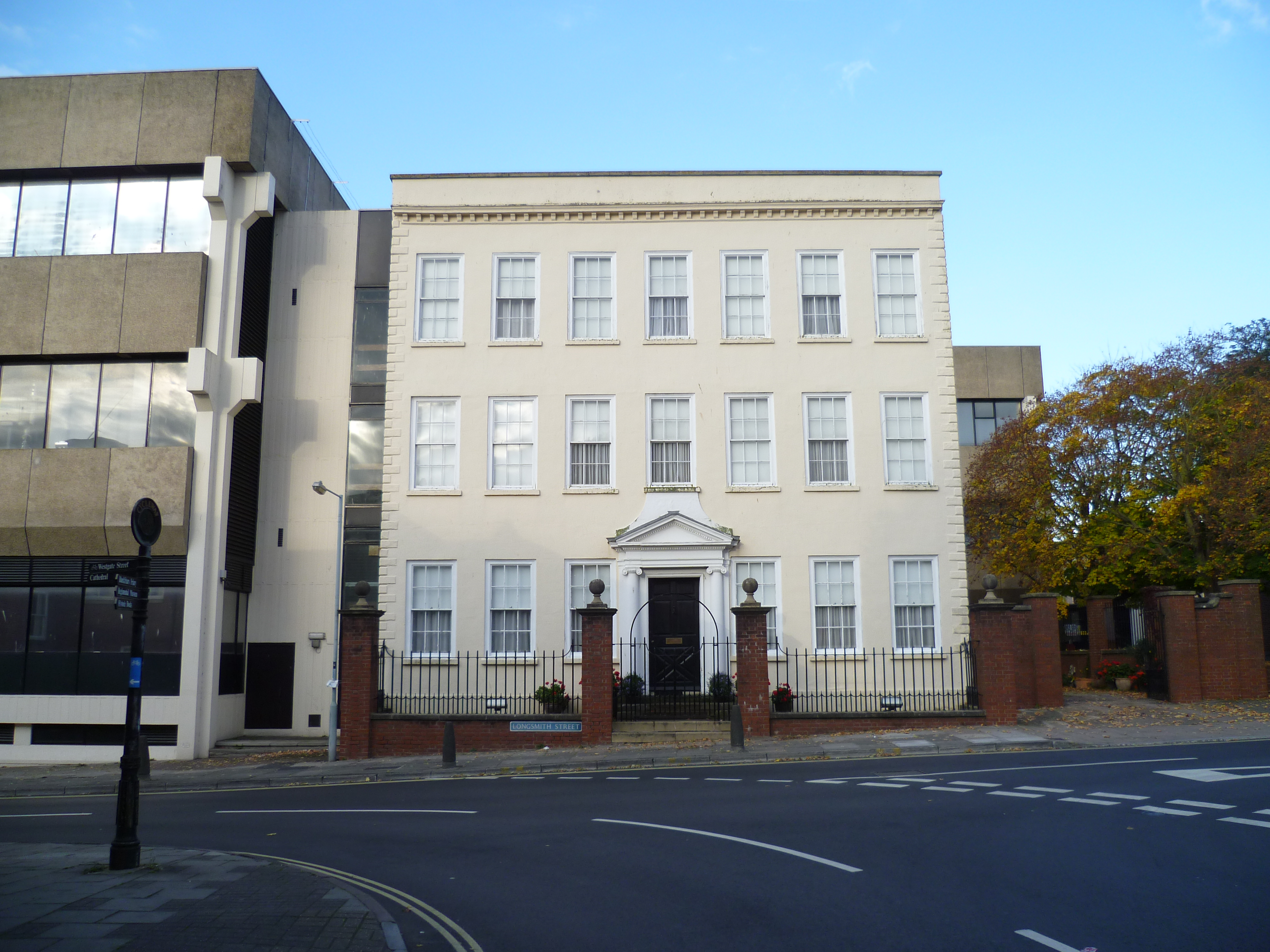
Ladybellegate House

Longsmith Street is a street in Gloucester that runs from Bearland in the north to Southgate Street in the south.

The street includes a number of listed buildings:

- 2 Longsmith Street & 28 Southgate Street
- 4 Longsmith Street
- Bearland House
- Bearland Lodge
- Gloucester Crown Court, part of the Shire Hall complex designed by Robert Smirke.
- Ladybellegate House
