= Ladybellegate House =

House in Gloucester, Gloucestershire, England

Coordinates: 51.8653°N 2.2482°W

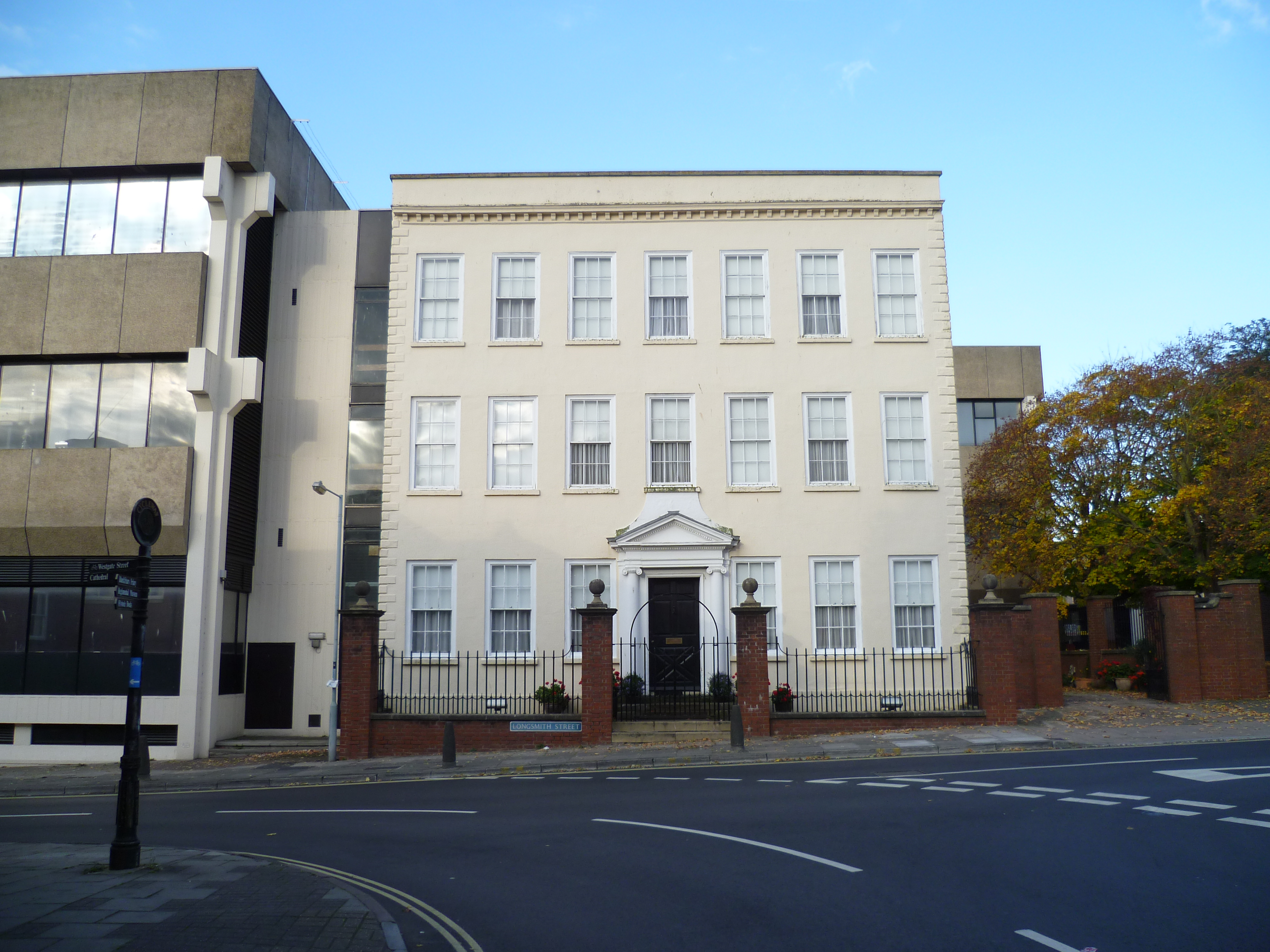
Ladybellegate House

Ladybellegate House, 20 Longsmith Street, Gloucester GL1 2HT, (National Grid Reference: SO 83003 18556) is a Grade I listed building with Historic England, reference number 1245726.

== History ==
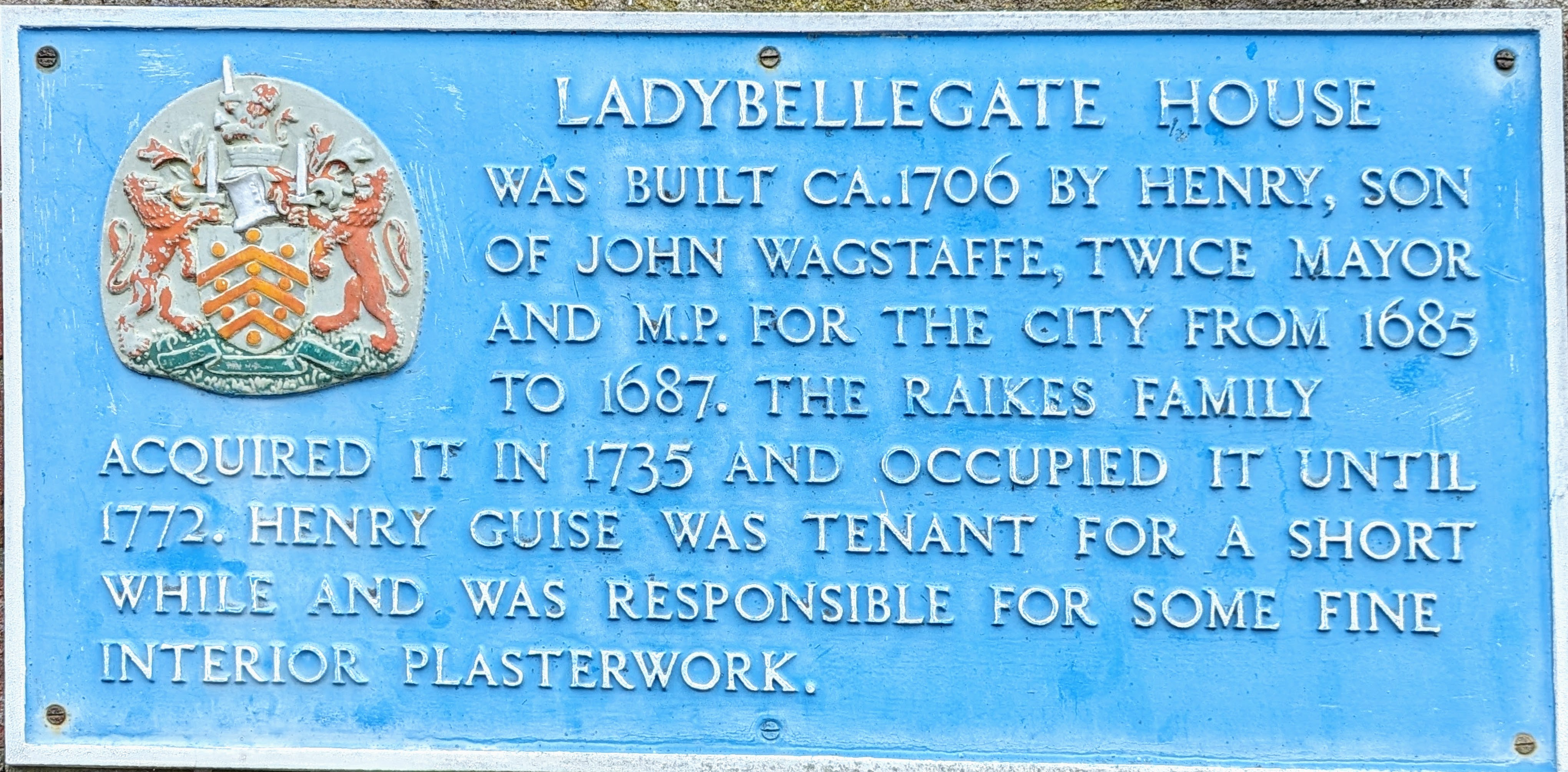
Plaque marking Ladybellegate House.

The building is a town house built around 1704 for Edward Wagstaffe. The house is notable for its fine Rococo plasterwork and carved oak staircase.

Robert Raikes junior, founder of Sunday Schools, was born at Ladybellegate House in 1736. He also lived there from 1757 to 1772.

From 1740 to 1743, the house was let to Henry Guise of Elmore during which time it was remodelled to include fine moulded panels incorporating the swan crest of the Guise family.

== Restoration ==
The building was acquired from the Post Office by the Gloucester Civic Trust in 1978. A loan from the Architectural Heritage Fund was combined with a successful fund raising to enable the building to be restored and the house was reopened by Princess Anne in 1979. It was the trust's first major restoration. The building was subsequently sold and the proceeds placed in the Gloucester Historic Buildings Fund, which is run jointly by Gloucester Historic Buildings Ltd and Gloucester City Council.

Today the building is used as offices.
