= Robin's Wood Hill Quarry =

Site of Special Scientific Interest in Gloucestershire

- Site of Special Scientific Interest
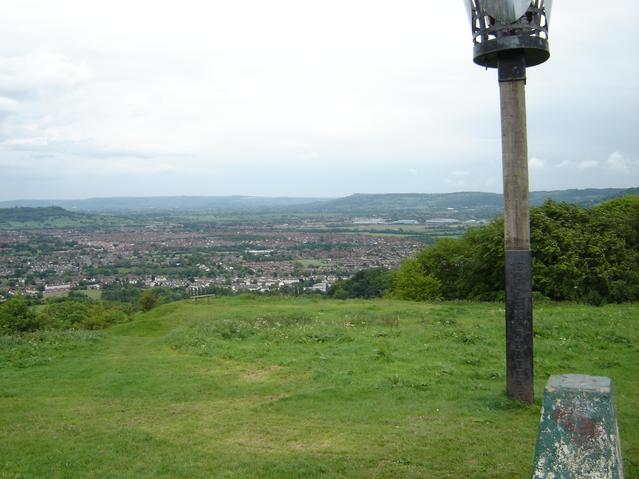
- View - Top of Robinswood Hill (Robin's Wood Hill)

- Location within Gloucestershire
- Location of Robin's Wood Hill Quarry.
- Area of search: Gloucestershire
- Grid reference: SO836148
- Coordinates: 51.83202°N 2.238673°W
- Interest: Geological
- Area: 1.67 ha (4.1 acres)
- Notification date: 1966

Robin's Wood Hill Quarry (grid reference SO836148) is a 1.67-hectare (4.1-acre) geological Site of Special Scientific Interest in Gloucestershire, on Robinswood Hill, notified in 1966.

== Location and geology ==
The quarry is managed by Gloucester City Council and is part of Robinswood Hill Country Park. This site contains a significant inland section of Lower Jurassic, Middle Lias strata. There is a complete section of the Upper Pliensbachian Stage. The site has been the centre of research for some time, and particularly its diverse faunas, which have hield some fifty-four species of fossil molluscs.

There is significant contrast from the silty nature of the Middle Lias, Marlstone Rock bed with the Junction Bed of the coast of Dorset and the Midlands ironstones. This contributes significantly to the reconstruction of the geography and the environment of the early Jurassic period.

== Conservation ==
Natural England reports in its assessment of August 2011 that the feral goats (introduced in 2005) are controlling the vegetation levels satisfactorily.

== SSSI Source ==
- Natural England SSSI information on the citation
- Natural England SSSI information on the Robin's Wood Hill Quarry unit
