= Hillfield Gardens, Gloucester =

Public park in Gloucester, England

Hillfield Gardens
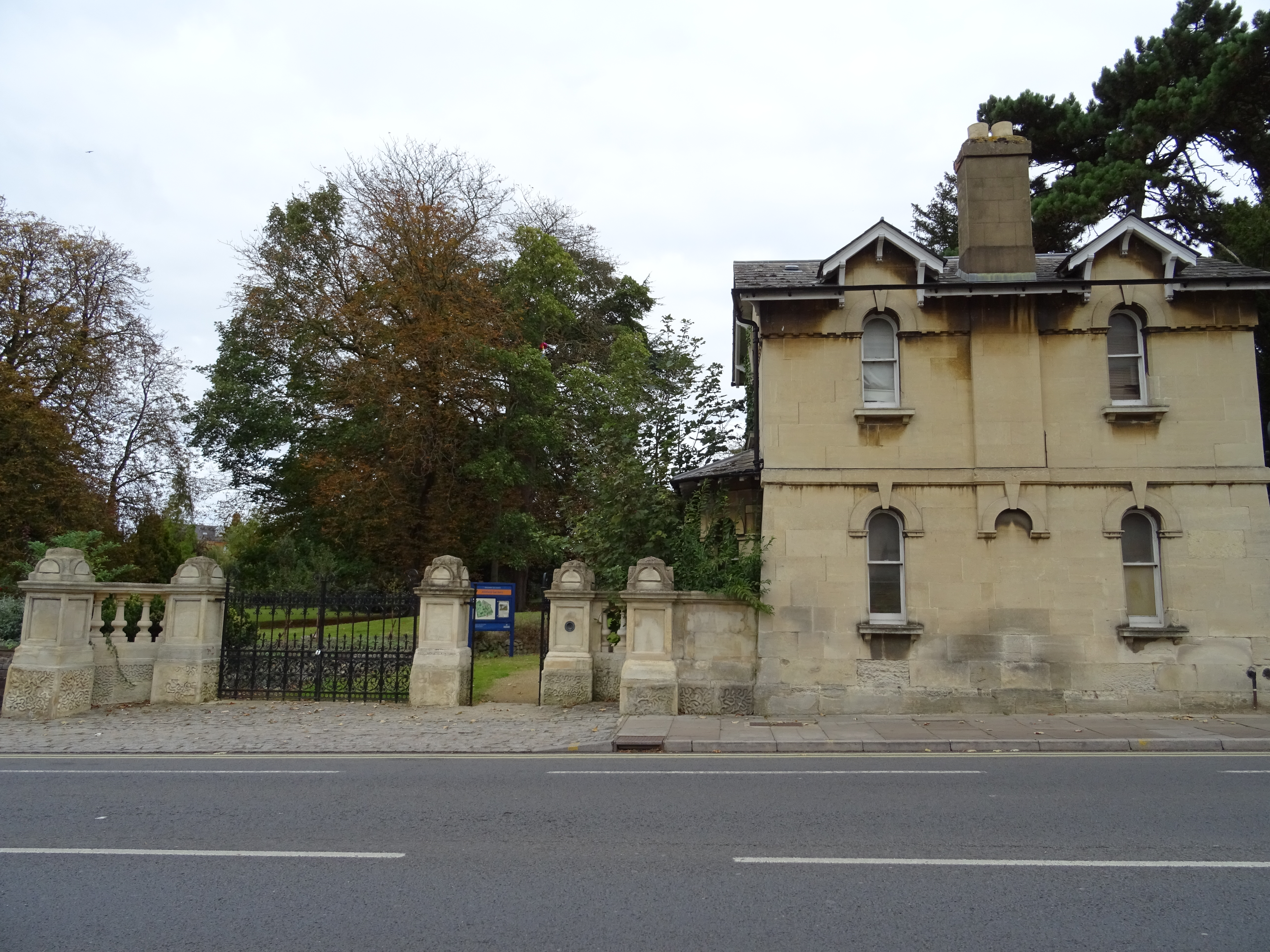
- Interactive map of Hillfield Gardens
- Type: Urban park / Garden
- Location: London Road, Gloucester, England
- Coordinates: 51°52′10″N 2°13′49″W
- Area: 0.1 acres (400 m^{2})
- Status: Open all year
- Parking: No dedicated parking
- Website: Visit Gloucester - Hillfield Gardens

Hillfield Gardens is a public park on London Road, Gloucester, England. It houses several historical monuments. The description in December 2020 stated: "Now a Council-owned public park covering about 1.6 hectares, Highfield Gardens is supported by an active Friends group which organises annual events".

== History ==
The gardens were originally part of Hillfield House, a Victorian house now owned by Gloucestershire County Council, built between 1867 and 1869. This replaced an older house built in 1826 which was known as Woodbine Hill which is also an alternative name for the gardens. The gardens were opened in 1933. The friends group which have managed the gardens since 2005, obtained the £50,000 grant from the National Lottery Community Spaces Program in 2013. This money was used to create add a sensory garden and a woodland walk area to Hillfield Gardens. Additionally a sculpture made by school children from Denmark Road school. The garden contains 3 mature redwood trees and a large oak tree which are among the oldest trees in Gloucester.

A BBC article from August 2013 discussed the restoration of the entrance to Hillfield Gardens: "cleaned and repaired the stone piers supporting the gates, and new balustrading was fitted. The metal gates were also cleaned, repaired and repainted".

== Entrance Gates ==
The entrance gates to the gardens are Grade II listed. They were formally the entrance to the grounds of Hillfield House and are accessible from London Road. The gates are made up of 5 Ashlar stone pillars supporting a pair of wrought iron gates for vehicles, and a single wrought iron gate to the right hand side for pedestrians. The pillars have moulded bases, a recessed panel on each side, and moulded cornices and capstones. Railings with short pillars topped with moulded copings link the main pillars. The lower half of the iron gates are decorated with circular patterns, and the top half has vertical poles decorated with finials. A short length of solid stone railing links the far right hand pier with the gate lodge. In 2013, The gates were renovated, costing £14,000. The stone pillars were cleaned and repaired and new railings were fitted. The iron gates were cleaned, repaired and repainted.

== St Mary Magdalen's chapel ==
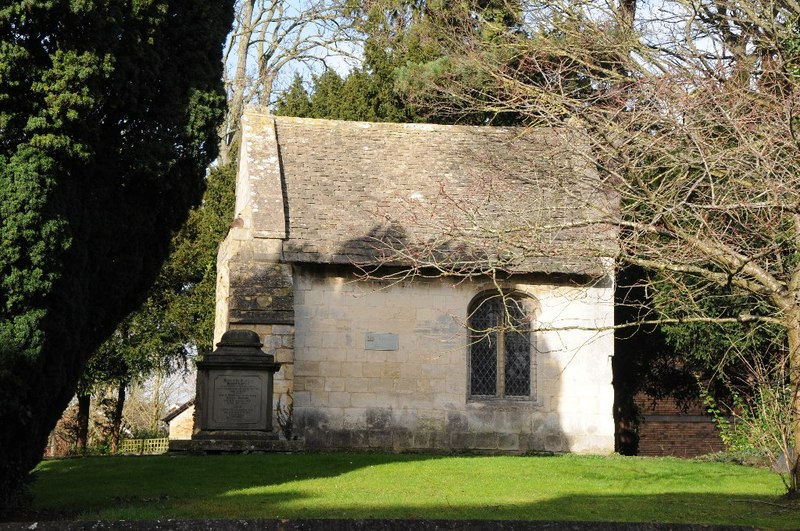
Remains of St Mary Magdalen chapel

There is a disused chapel located on the east side of the park, It is a Grade II* listed building. It is the chancel of the Leper's hospital chapel founded around the 12th century, the rest of the hospital stood on the opposite side of London Road. There are many carvings on the walls of the chapel which may have been made by pilgrims which may represent various saints days or religious festivals. The symbols include a fleur-de-lys, a star of epiphany, symbols representing the Feast of the Cross, the feast of St Valentine and All Saints' Day. The nave of the chapel was demolished in 1861. At this time the south and west doorways were taken down and reassembled in the chancel. The south doorway has flowers and rosettes carved into it, with cable and pellet symbols. There is a life-sized 13th-century effigy of Kyneburga, a Saxon princess.

== King's Board ==
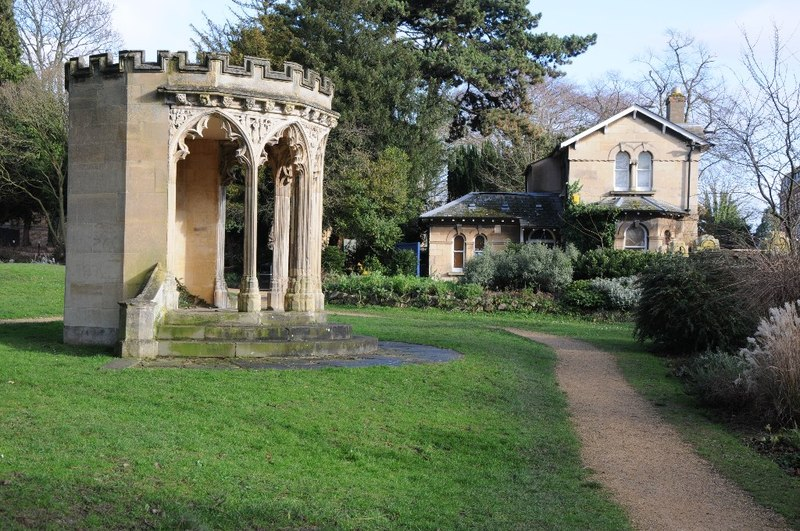
King's Board in Hillfield Gardens

The King's Board is a small Grade II* listed decagonal building. It is made of moulded Ashlar stone with detailed carvings, and a flat composition roof. It has 10 sides, and sits upon a solid stone base. There is an open arcade of five bays on the south side, a solid wall of plain Ashlar on the north side, and three stone steps in a semi-circle which stop against short wing walls on the east and west sides. It was built around the 18th century, in the grounds of Marybone House. Its arcades and architectural details are said to come from a 14th Century Medieval market house in Westgate Street called the King's Board which was demolished in 1780. The building was moved in the mid 19th century to the grounds of Tibberton Court. In 1936, the monument was moved to its current location in Hillfield Gardens.

== Scrivens Conduit ==
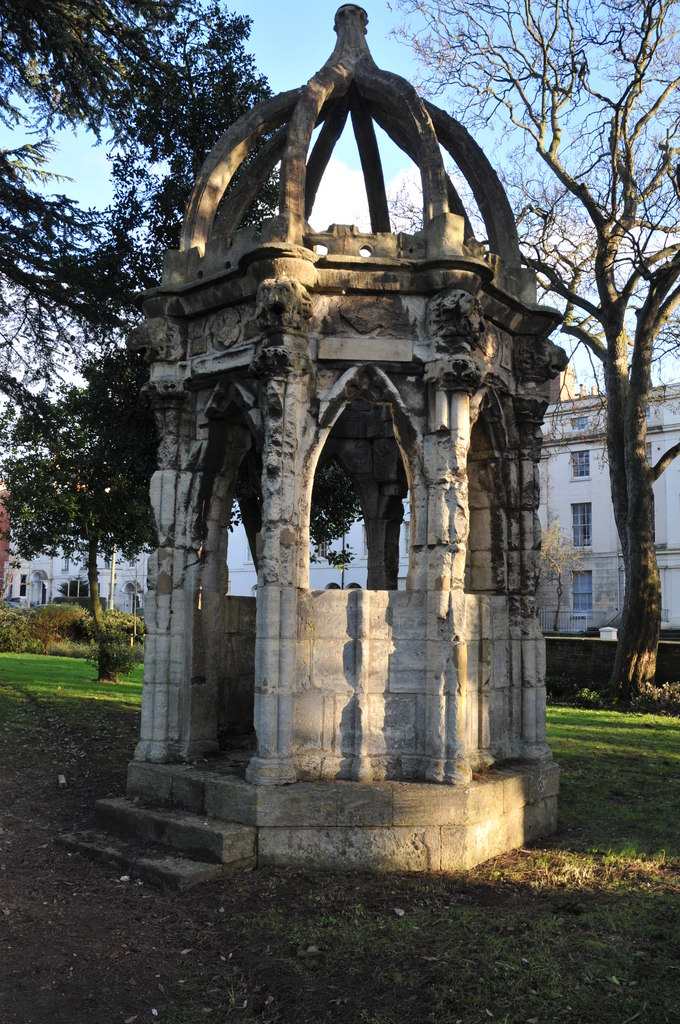
Scriven's Conduit in Hillfield Gardens

Scrivens Conduit is an elaborate Grade II* listed carved stone structure. It is made of Ashlar Limestone from Painswick. It is carved and moulded in Jacobean style with Renaissance and Gothic influence. It was originally built in 1636, for Alderman John Scriven in Southgate Street as a conduit head over a piped water supply running from Robinswood Hill to the centre of Gloucester. It was removed in 1784 and rebuilt in a garden in Dog Lane. In the 1830s, the conduit head was moved to Edgeworth Manor. In 1937, it was given to the city of Gloucester and rebuilt in Hillfield Gardens.
