= Richard Chandler (wool-stapler) =

British wool merchant (died 1810)

- Died: 1810
- Occupation: wool merchant

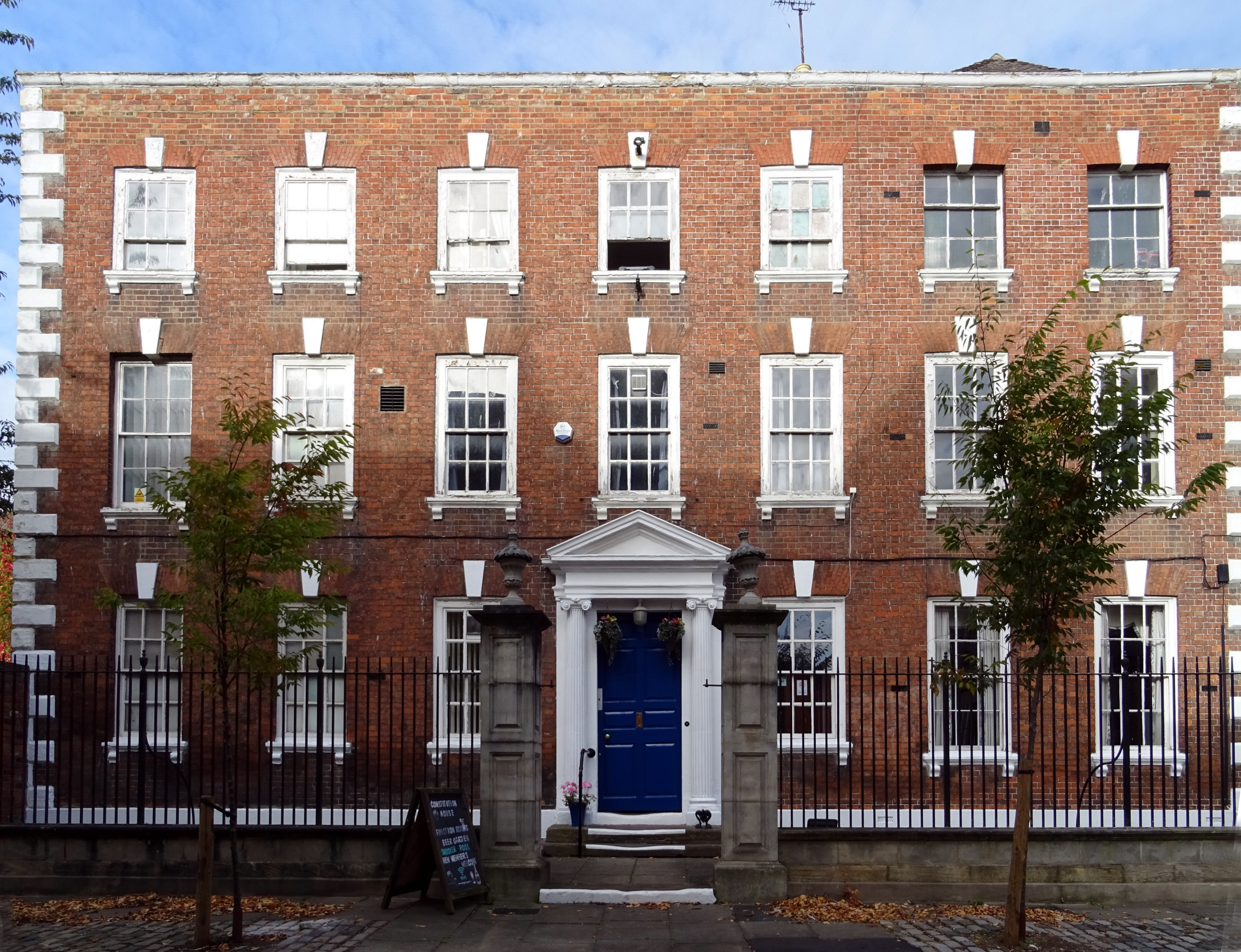
Winston Hall, built for Richard Chandler in 1750

Richard Chandler (died 1810) was a wealthy wool-stapler of Gloucester.

In 1750, he had Winston Hall built for him in Constitution Walk, Gloucester, now a grade II* listed building. The house remained in the Chandler family until 1876. He was one of the original subscribers to the Gloucester and Sharpness Canal in 1792.

His will is held by the National Archives in Kew.
