= Wool-stapler =

Person who weighs and grades wool for market

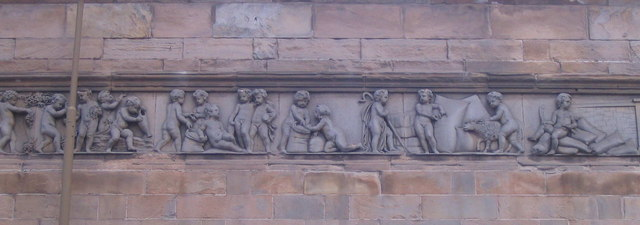
The frieze of the Leith Corn Exchange showing wool-staplers at work

A wool-stapler is a dealer in wool. The wool-stapler buys wool from the producer, sorts and grades it, and sells it on to manufacturers.

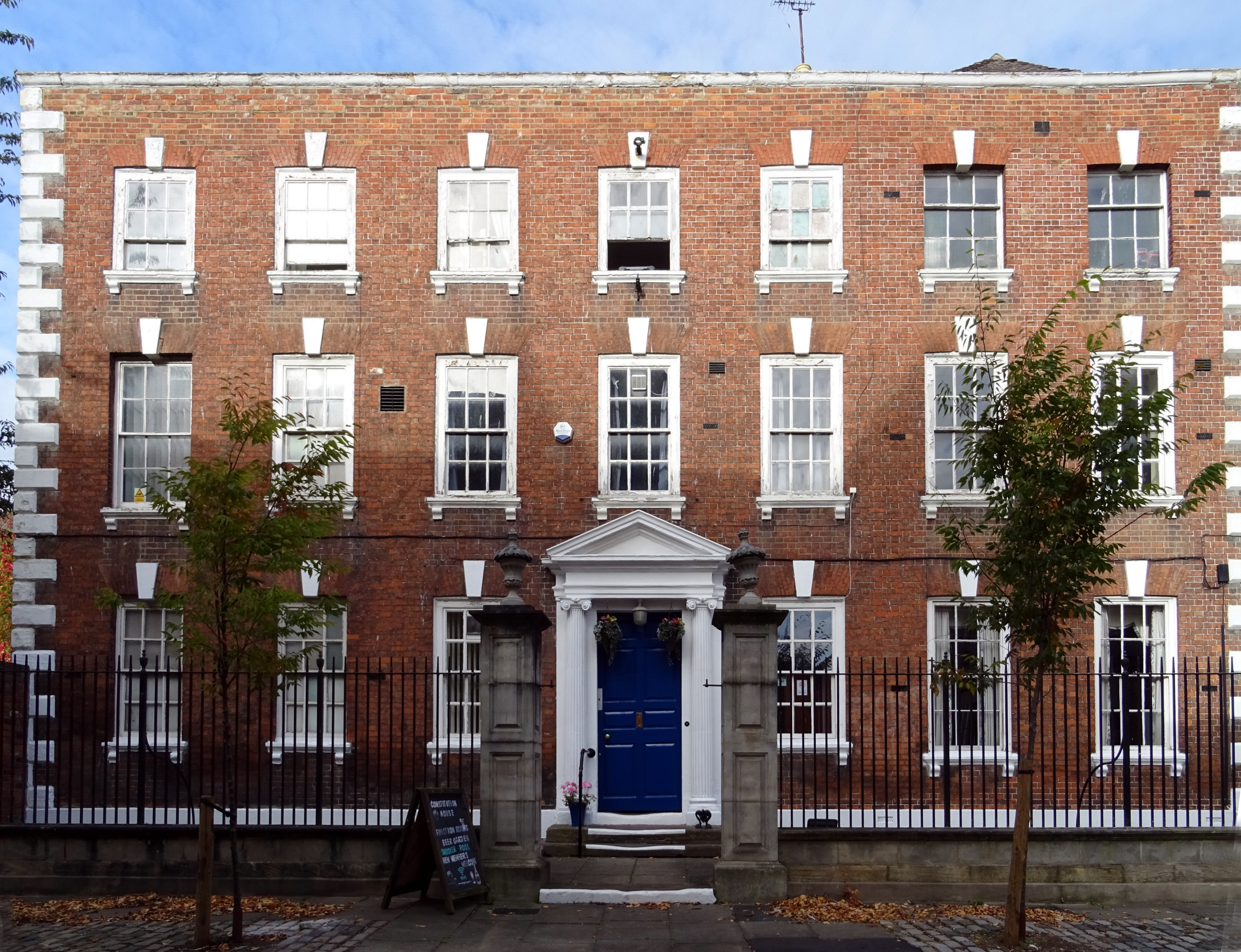
Winston Hall, built in Gloucester in 1750 for the wool-stapler Richard Chandler

Some wool-staplers acquired significant wealth, such as Richard Chandler of Gloucester (England) who built Winston Hall in 1750.

== Staples ==
"Staple" in this particular context means a market.

Before the 17th century, a staple was also a particular type of market, "a place appointed by royal authority, in which a body of merchants had exclusive right of purchase of certain goods destined for export".

The now best known English staple was at Calais but in medieval times there were, at various times, many other staple towns throughout the kingdoms of England and Ireland and the facing coast of the Low Countries all involved, though not exclusively, with the English wool trade.

== Etymology ==
The term "wool-stapler" fell out of use during the 20th century.

== References and sources ==
Sources

- Oxford English Dictionary entries for 'wool-stapler' and 'staple'.
