= St George Church, Gloucester =

St George Church
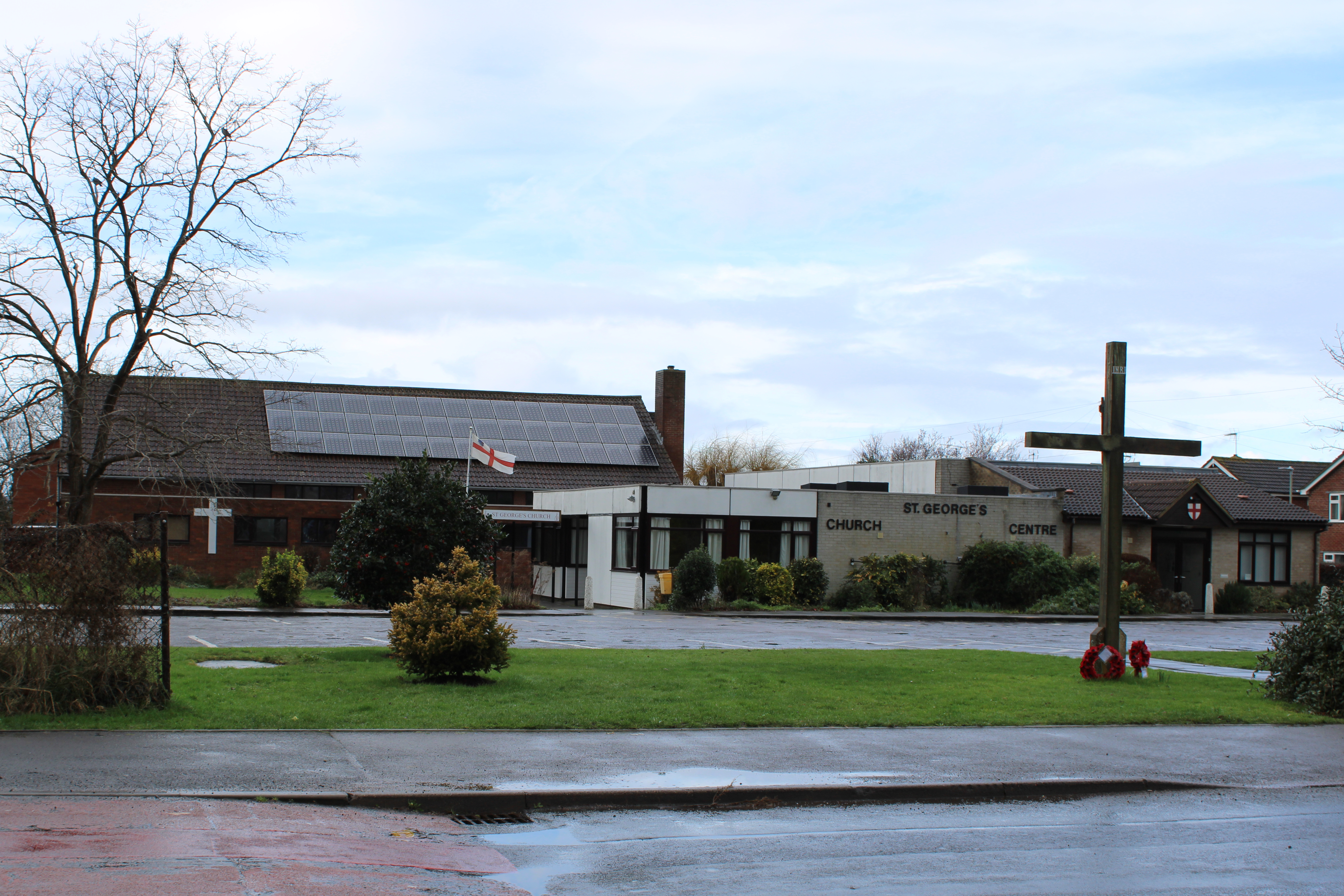
- Front of St George Church in February 2024
- Interactive map of St George Church
- 51.833245°N 2.257308°W
- Location: Gloucester

St George Church is an Anglican church on Grange Road, Tuffley, Gloucestershire, England. Its worship style comprises common Anglican worship with seasonal variations.

== History ==
The church was established in 1941, but did not have a hall until 1942, when Whaddon Church Hall, a wooden building, was moved to Grange Road. In 1947, a temporary church was built and, in 1948, it became a conventional district. In 1950, the temporary building was extended and the church was dedicated to Saint George. The vicarage house for the church was built in Grange Road in 1954. The brick church was built in 1956, it was designed to be a church hall and there were also plans for it to be connected to another bigger church via a cloister. However, the bigger church was never built so the new church hall became the main church building, and the old temporary church became the church hall. In 1967, the district became the parish of St George. In 1970 and 1971, the church hall was demolished and several new rooms were added to the north-east including a new hall, meeting rooms, kitchen and toilets. At this point the church was also known as the St George's Centre as it was a much used community resource. In the late 1970s, two houses for the clergy were built to the west of the main building. In 1981, the church was re-orientated and enlarged, most of the west wall was demolished and, in its place, a sanctuary and chapel were built. Internally, partition walls were demolished to form a wide open space inside. The newly built parts of the church were dedicated by the Bishop of Gloucester.

== Vicarage ==
The vicarage is a modern, four-bedroom detached home located on Grange Road, to the north-east of the church.

== Parish of St George ==
The population of the parish is approximately 9,600. It includes parts of Podsmead and Lower Tuffley, with the A38 going through the middle of the parish. It is in the twenty-five percent of the most deprived parishes in England and is the tenth most deprived parish in the Diocese of Gloucester.
