= Gloucester Civic Trust =

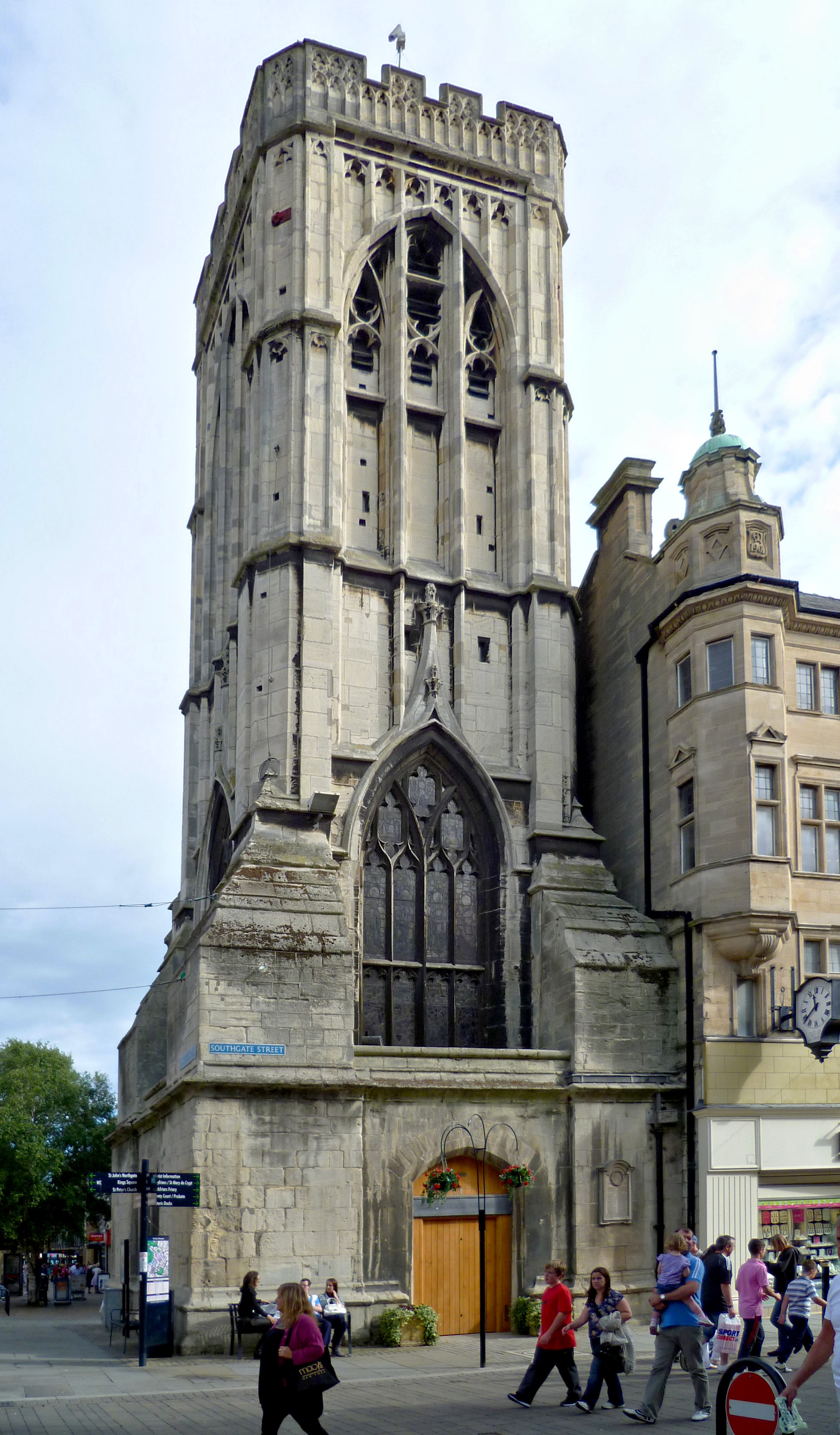
St. Michael's Tower, Gloucester

Gloucester Civic Trust Limited is a registered charity (number 264719) which exists to promote the appreciate and conservation of Gloucester's heritage. Founded in 1972, the Trust is based in St. Michael's Tower, The Cross, Gloucester GL1 1PA.

== Legal status ==
The Trust is incorporated as a company limited by guarantee, number 01078805.

== Governance ==
The Trust is run by volunteers who sit on different committees who all report to an overall Council of Management.

== Finances ==
In the year ended 31 December 2010 the Trust had gross income of £38,342, compared with £134,974 in 2009 which included a large grant from the Heritage Lottery Fund for the restoration of St. Michael's Tower which cost over £300,000. Net assets of the trust at 31 December 2010 were £86245 (2009 £94416).

== Activities ==
Past achievements of the Trust include:

- The restoration of St. Michael's Tower.
- Restoring and transforming the Dick Whittington pub
- Saving and restoring the Crown Inn
- Commissioning the Emperor Nerva Statue
- Restoring the Robert Raikes statue in Gloucester Park
- The restoration of Ladybellegate House
- Involvement with the regeneration of Gloucester Docks
- Commissioning the Aviation Murals in Jubilee Gardens

== Selected publications ==
- Hurst, Henry & Hugh Conway-Jones. The Port of Gloucester. 1988.

== See also ==
- Grade I listed buildings in Gloucester
