= Winston Hall =

Coordinates: 51°51′49″N 2°14′41″W

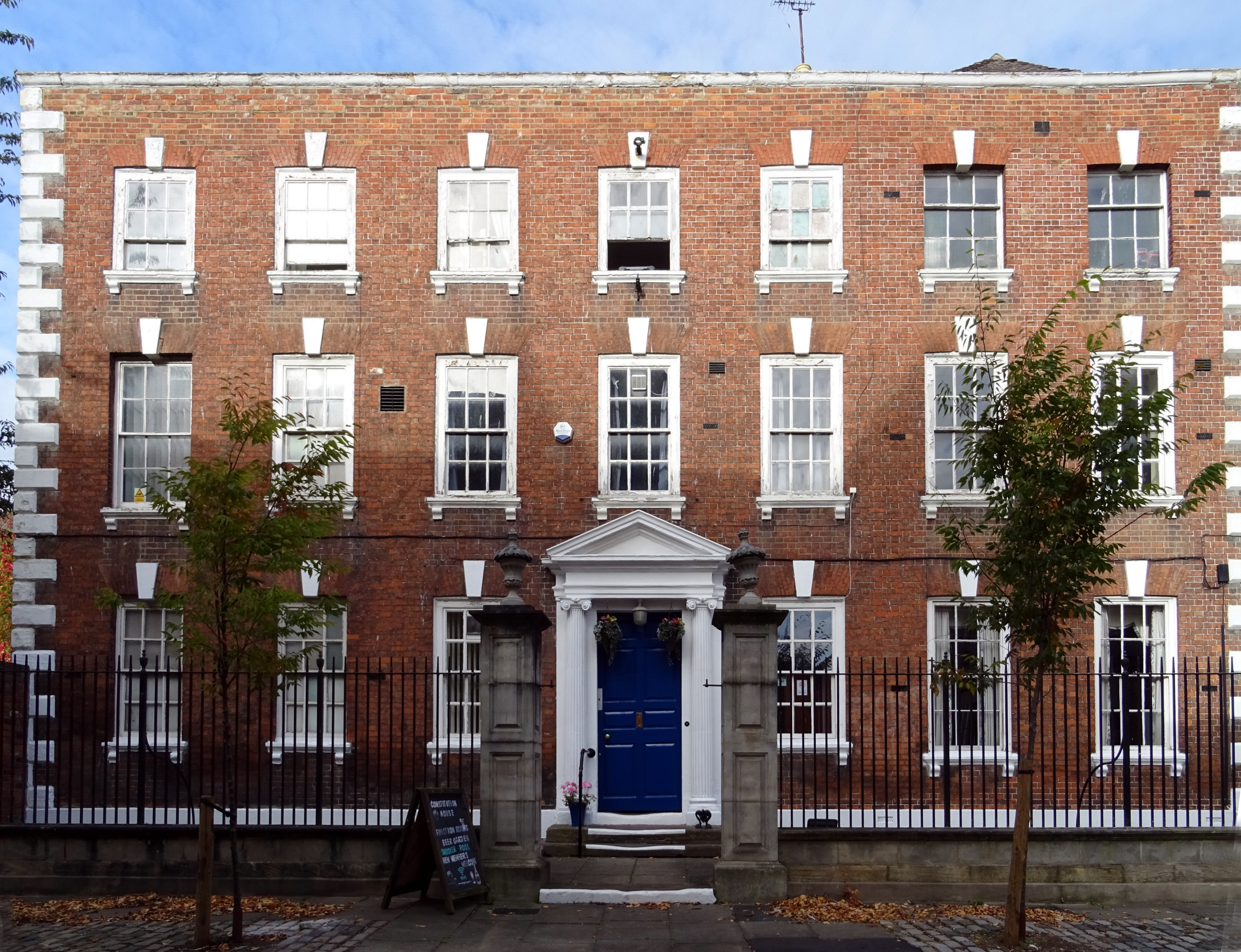
Winston Hall, now home to the Constitution Club

Winston Hall, also known as Constitution House, is a grade II* listed building in Constitution Walk, off Bell Lane, in the city of Gloucester, England.

It was built in 1750 as a townhouse for Richard Chandler, a wealthy wool-stapler, and remained in the Chandler family until 1876 when it became a school for young ladies. In 1883, it became the clubhouse for the Gloucester branch of the Conservative Party and is now a private member's club known as the Constitution Club.
