= Bearland House =

Grade II* listed building in Longsmith Street, Gloucester, England

Coordinates: 51°51′56″N 2°14′57″W

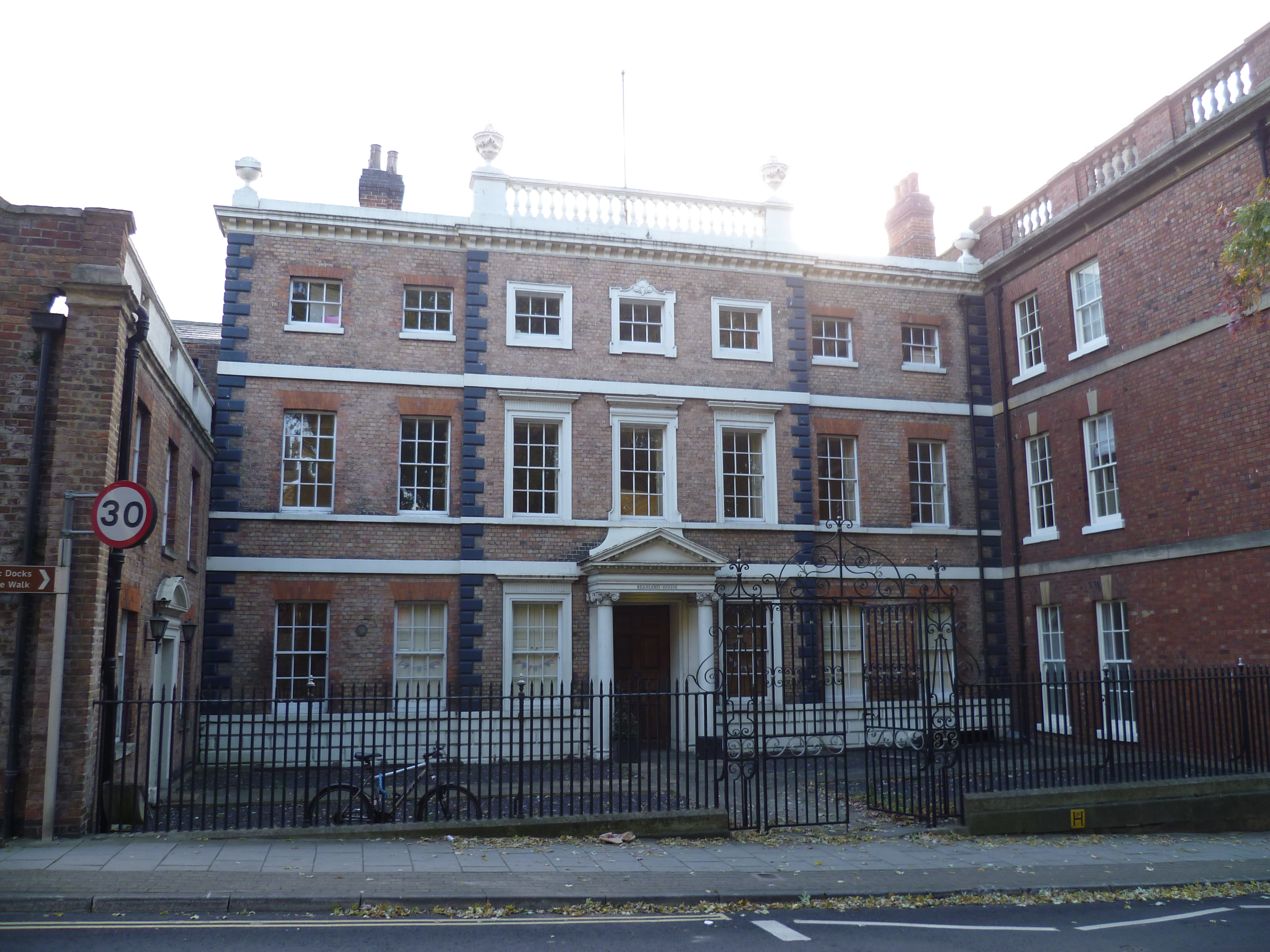
Bearland House

Bearland House is a grade II* listed building in Longsmith Street, Gloucester, England.

The house was built in the 1740s and has been used for different purposes since then. Initially it was a private house. In the early 20th century it was a school and then a telephone exchange. Since then it has been offices and used for manufacturing. The west wing was demolished in 1912.

== History ==
The house was built in the 1740s by local lawyer Willian Jones. This involved the rebuilding or remodelling of a previous building on the same site. In 1764 it was bought by the High Sheriff of Gloucestershire.

From 1904 to 1909 the building was used by the High School for Girls (now Denmark Road High School). A fire station was built on the site of the west wing in 1912. Later it was used by the General Post Office in Gloucester as a telephone exchange.

In 1980 the architects Preece Payne Partnership converted the building into use as offices. In 2010 Emma Willis established a clothing manufacturing centre in Bearland House, which was visited by Prince Charles in February 2020.

== Architecture ==
The three-storey building has an ornamental facade with wrought iron gates and railings in front of the house. The front of the building is symmetrical with seven-bays with a porch with Roman Ionic columns and a Pulvinated frieze over the door in the central bay. At the top of the front, above the three central bays, is a balustrade parapet with turned balusters. The two-storey wing has a three-bay front. The interior includes a wide central hall with dado panelling and a staircase with balusters.
