= St Michael's Tower, Gloucester =

Church tower in Gloucester, England

Coordinates: 51.8652°N 2.2458°W

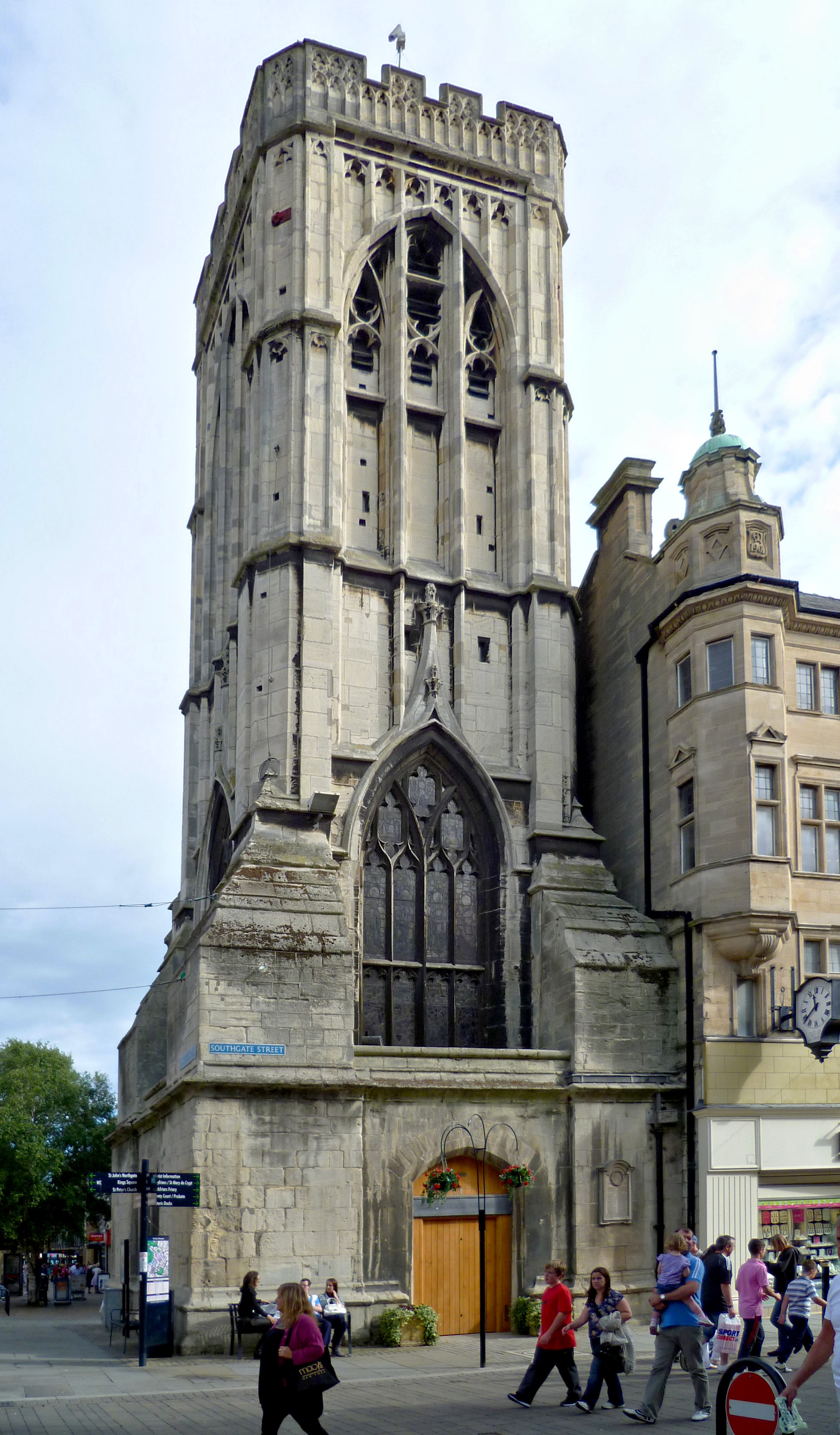
St Michael's Tower

St Michael's Tower, Gloucester, stands at The Cross, where the four main streets of Gloucester (Northgate, Eastgate, Southgate and Westgate Streets) meet. The Cross is also the highest point in the city. The Tower is on the corner of Eastgate and Southgate Streets and the entrance is in Southgate Street. It was built in 1465 on the site of the previous St Michael the Archangel. It is no longer used for religious ceremonies. It became a Grade II* listed building in 1952.

== History ==
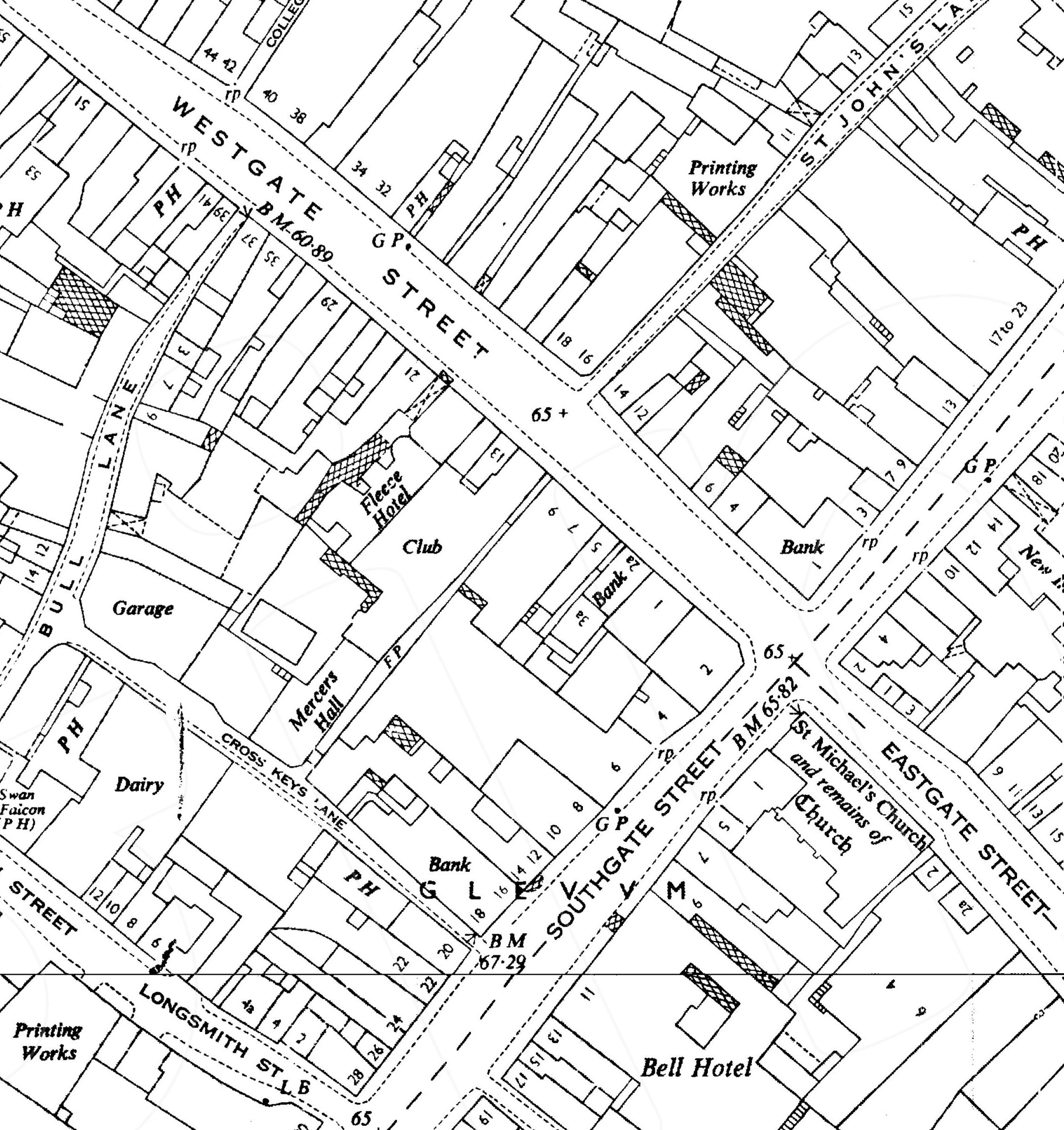
1950s map showing the tower and church remains.

The tower was built in 1465 on the site of the nave of the previous church of St Michael the Archangel. There had been a church on the site since the 12th century and Roman remains were found under the tower. In the 1840s the old church was demolished, apart from the tower, and a new church was constructed in 1851. The new St Michael’s Church was closed in 1940, however, and in 1952 the parish was united with St Mary de Crypt. The main part of the new church was demolished in 1956, but again the tower was spared.

From 1976 until 1981, the upper floors were used as a bell museum and between 1985 and 1998 it was used as a tourist information centre. At one time the ground floor was an open walkway between Eastgate and Southgate Streets. Eventually it fell into disrepair and was used as storage space by Gloucester City Council.

== Restoration ==
In 2009, Gloucester City Council granted a lease on the building to the Gloucester Civic Trust and in 2010 the Tower was restored by the trust at a cost of over £300,000, with the help of grants from the Heritage Lottery Fund and other donors. The Tower has since become the headquarters of the civic trust who aim to create "A tower of learning" devoted to the history of Gloucester.

In August 2011 a campaign was launched by the Civic Trust to reinstate a bell in the tower. This has now been achieved.

== Gallery ==
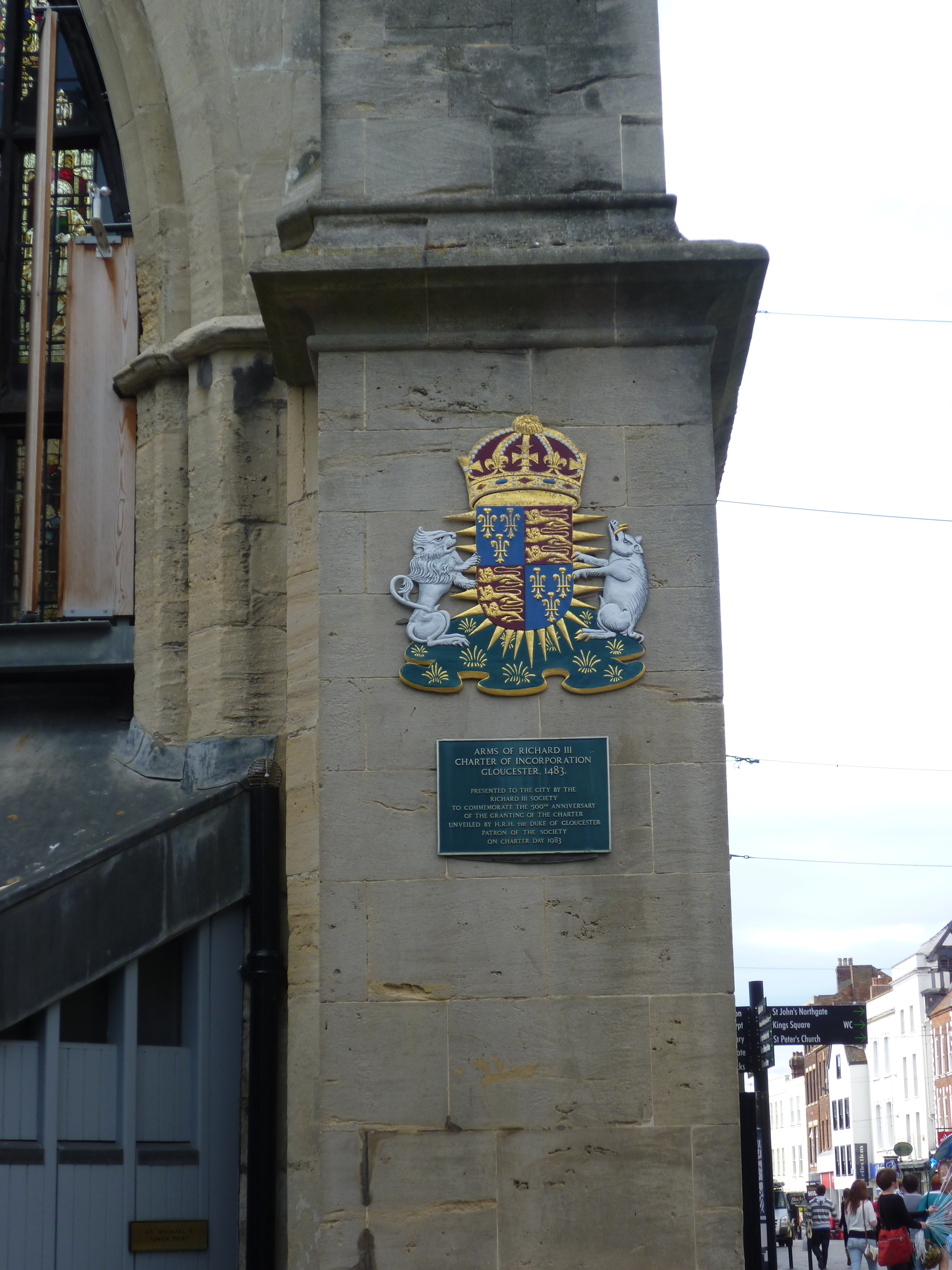
Arms of Richard III, Eastgate Street.

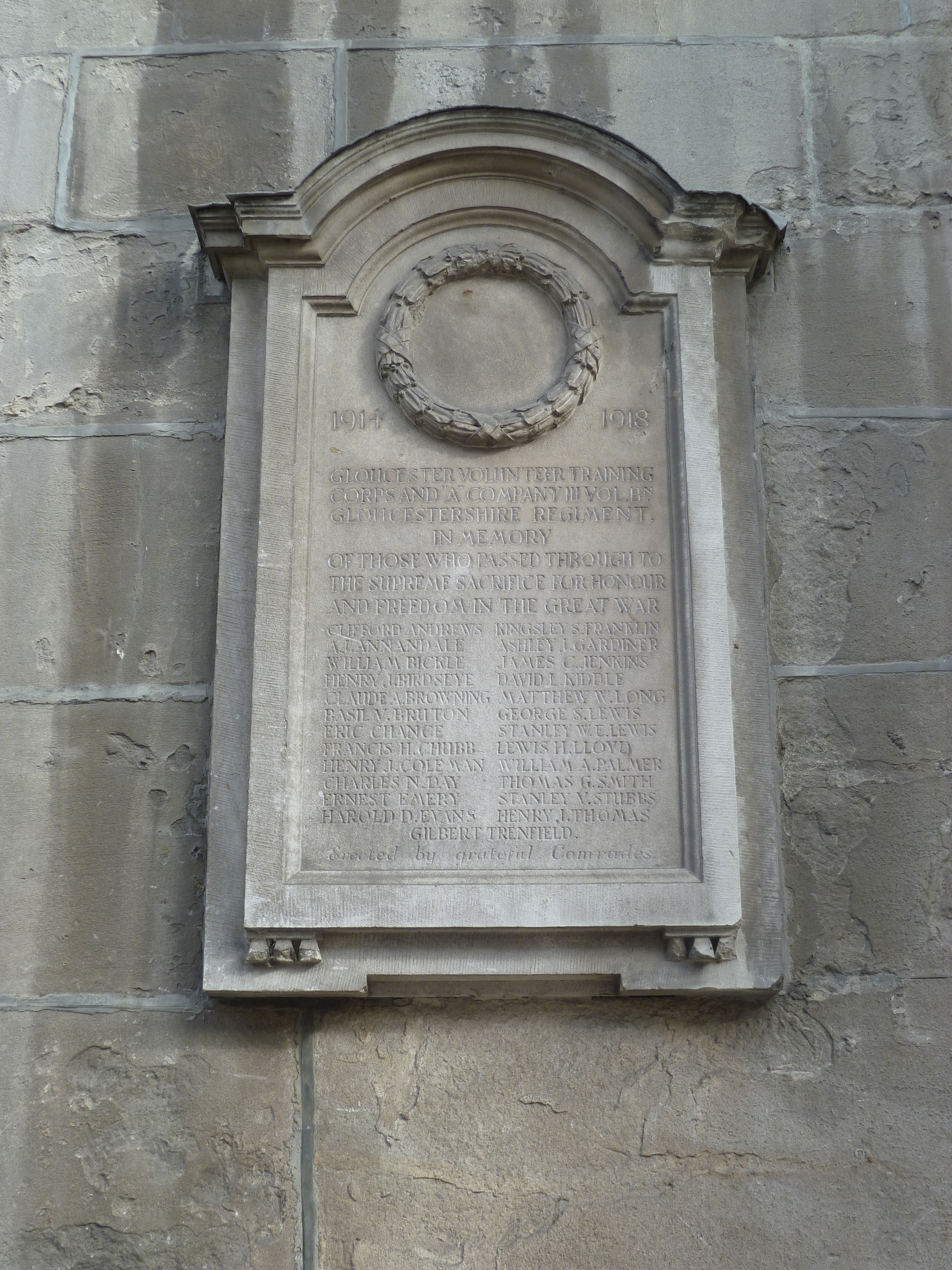
Memorial plaque to the dead of the Gloucester volunteer Training Corps in the First World War, Southgate Street.

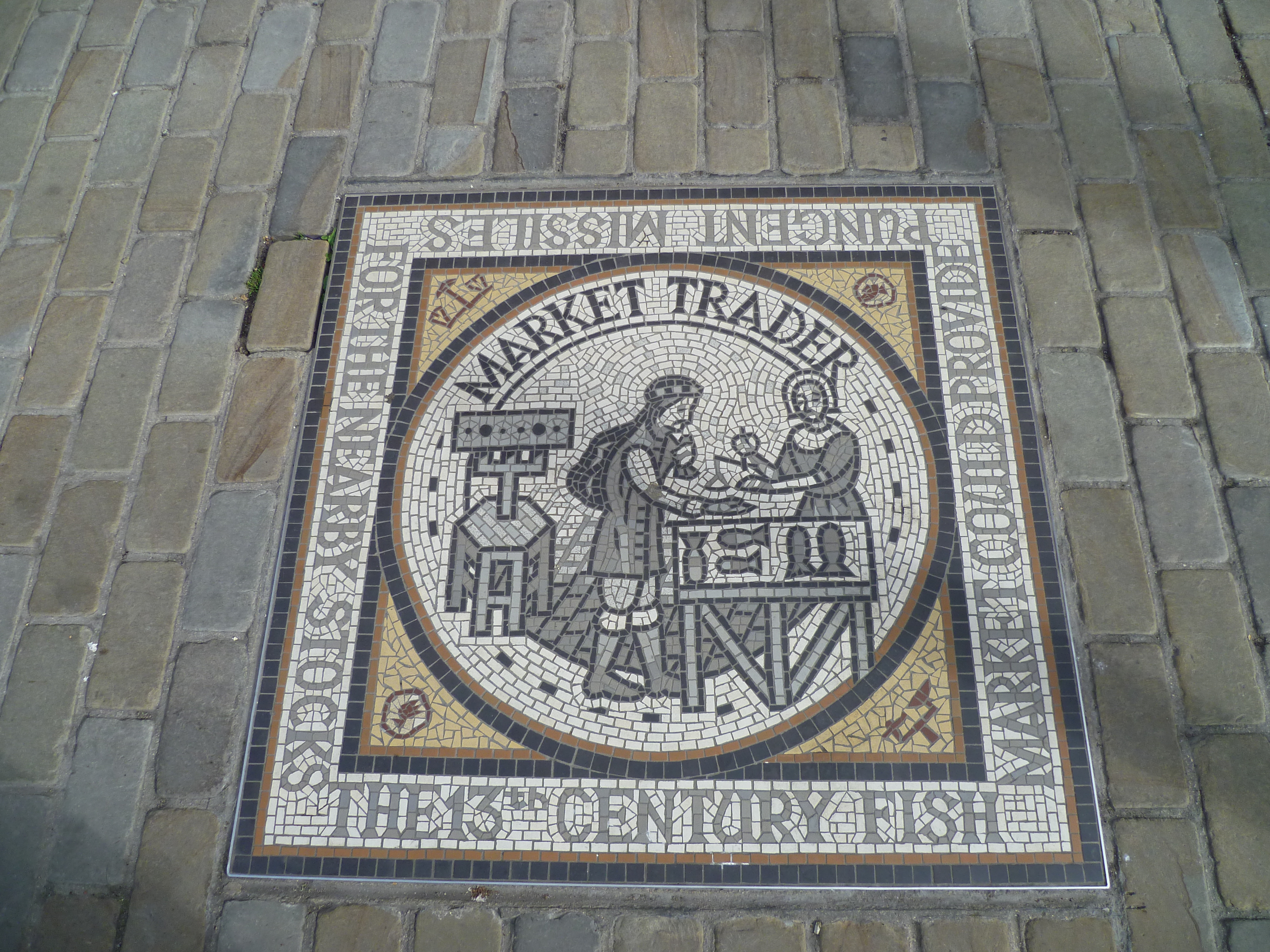
Mosaic, Southgate Street.

== See also ==
- Gloucester Civic Trust
