= King Edward's Gate =

Gatehouse in Gloucester

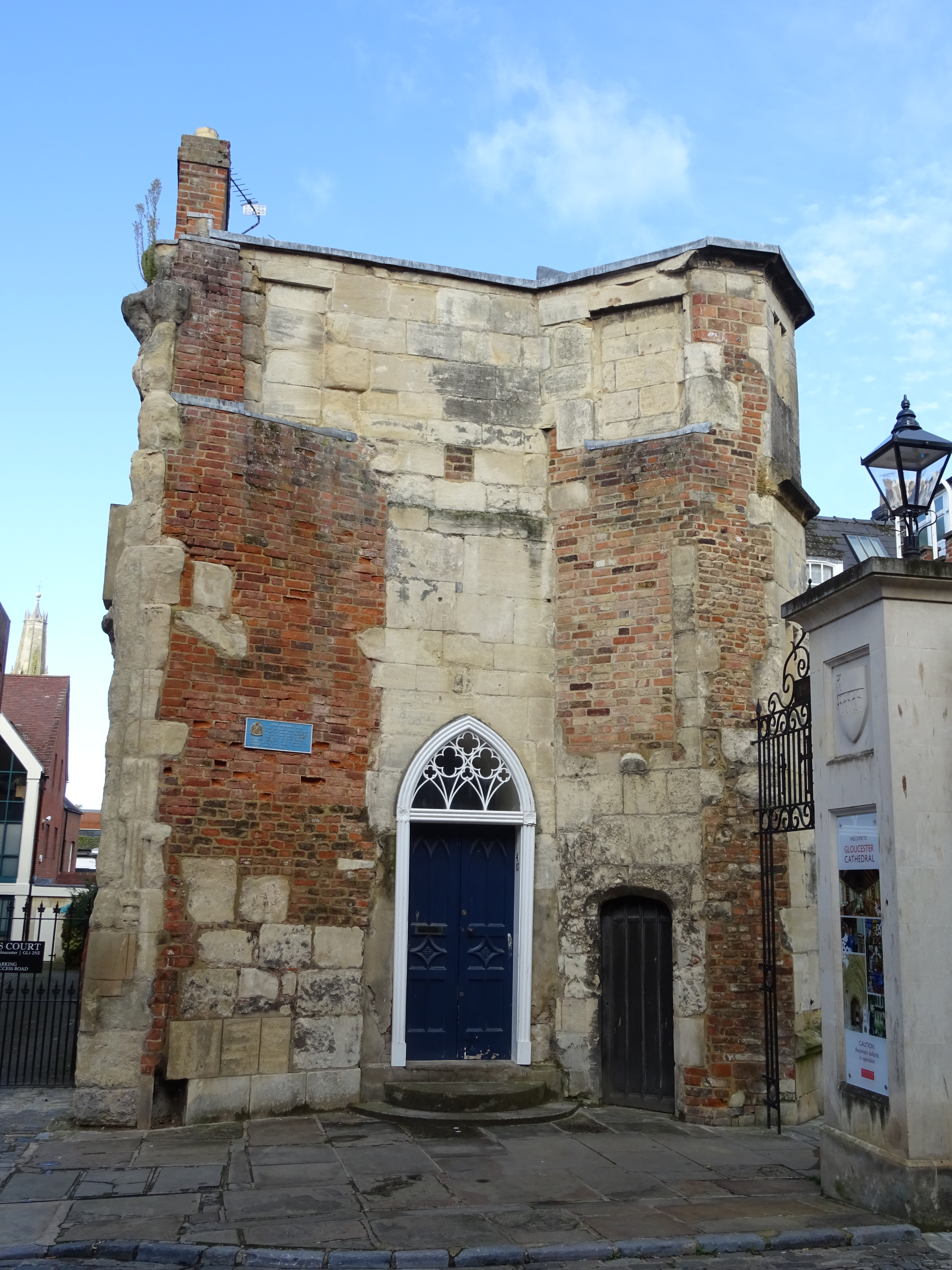

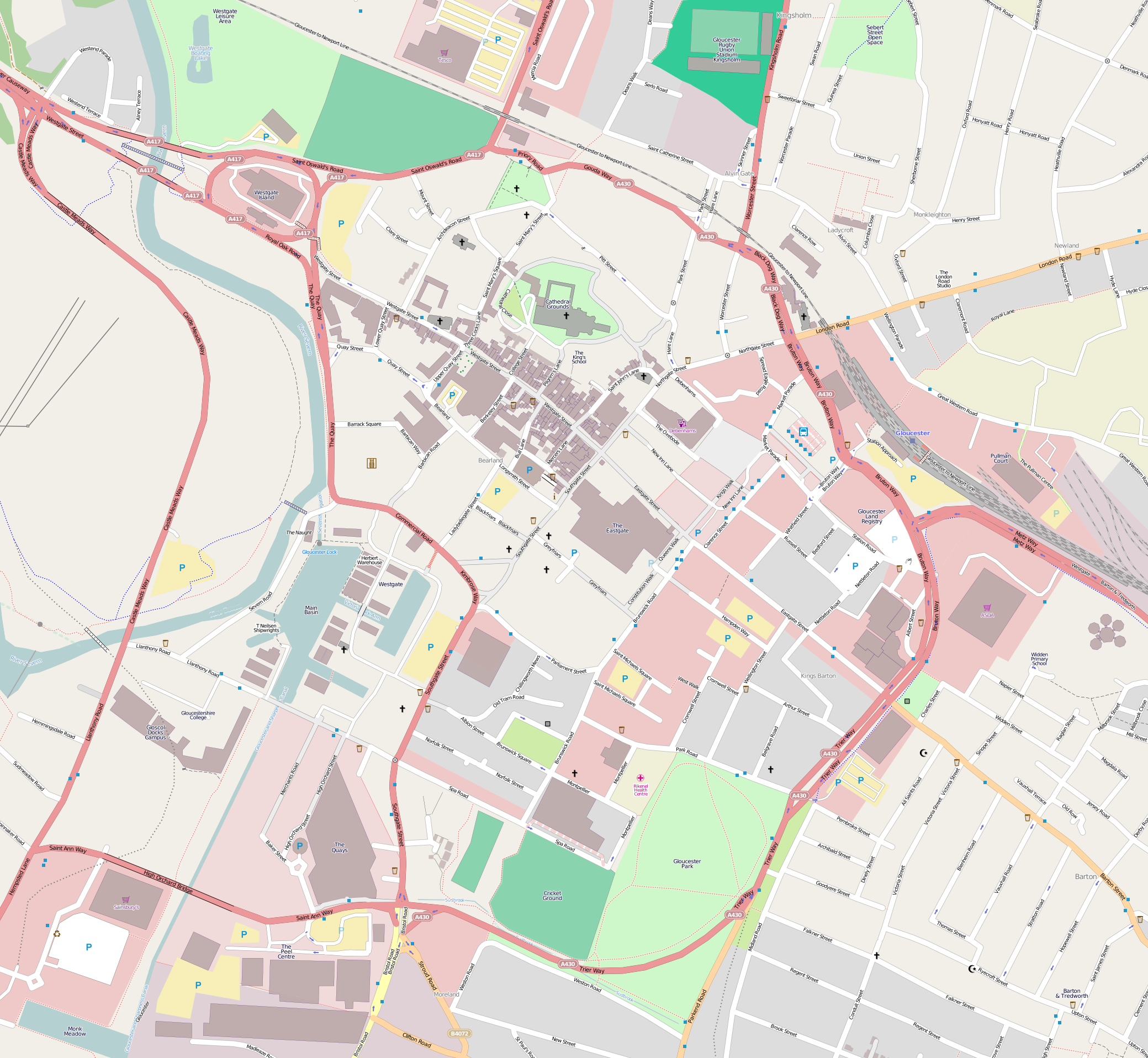
- Location within Gloucester Central
- 51°52′01″N 2°14′52″W
- Type: Gatehouse
- Location: College Street, Gloucester
- OS grid reference: SO830187

History
- Built: 16th century

Site notes
- Architectural style: 16th century

Listed Building – Grade II*
- Designated: 23 January 1952
- Reference no.: 1245909

King Edward's Gate is a Grade II* listed gatehouse in College Street, Gloucester, at the entrance of Gloucester Cathedral.

== History ==
There are references to this site being used as a Lichgate as early as 1223. It originally served as an entrance to the St Peter's Abbey cemetery, through which many of Gloucester's inhabitants were taken for burial in the early middle ages. In 1272, King Edward I took St Peter's Abbey under his control and soon after rebuilt the gate, which continued to be called Lichgate. In 1327, the body of King Edward II was received here for burial.

A new gatehouse was built on top of the remains of the medieval gatehouse, in the early 16th century, with the surviving portion dating back to this time. By this time the gate had become popularly associated with King Edward II and his burial in the abbey, so it became known as King Edward's Gate. It was badly damaged in the English Civil War and completely demolished at some point during the 17th century to create to create a wider entrance to the precinct. All that remains is the West flanking wall which now forms the front of a residential house, which was built in the early 19th century.

== Architecture ==
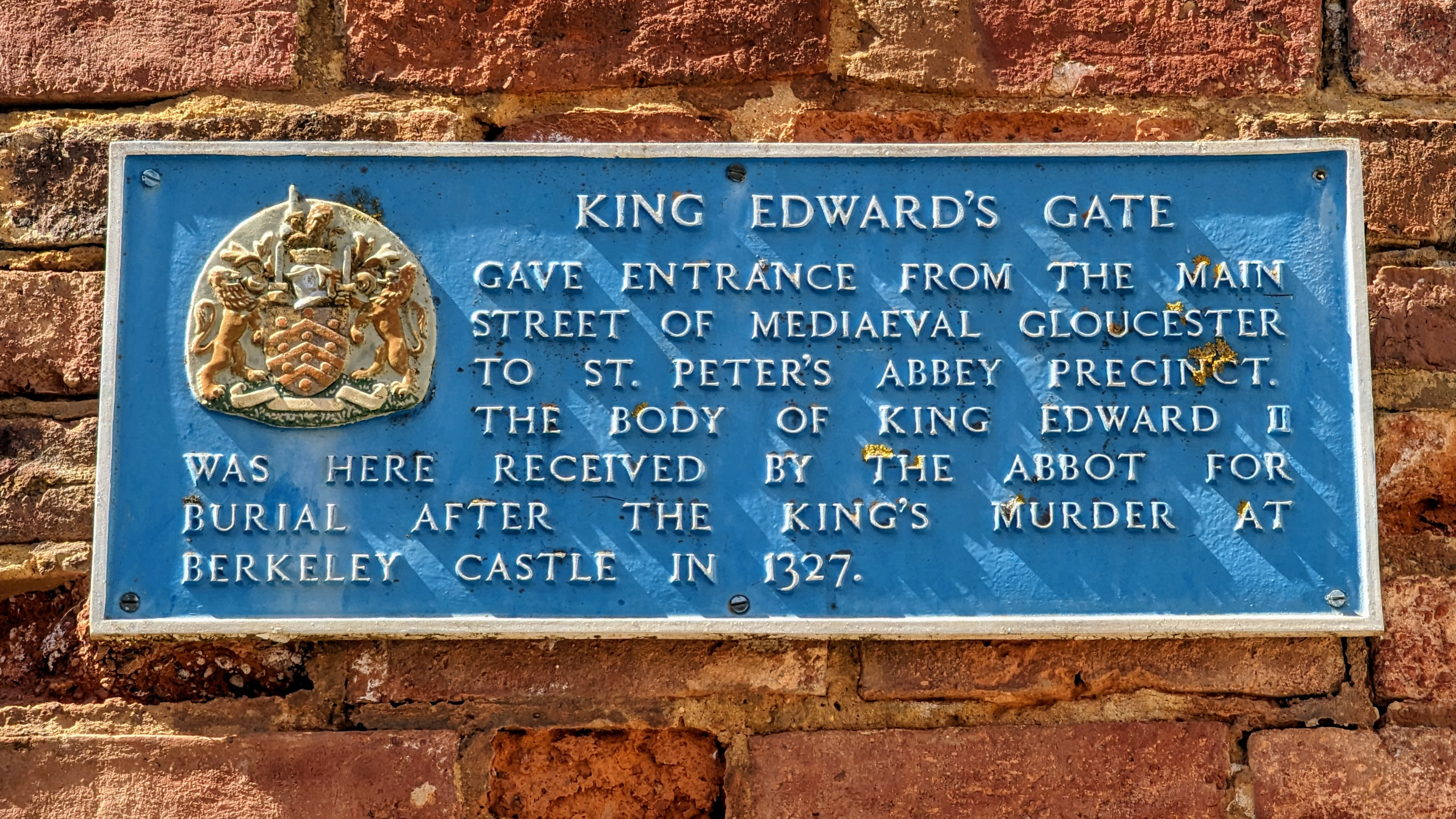
Plaque which states about King Edward II's burial at St Peter's Abbey

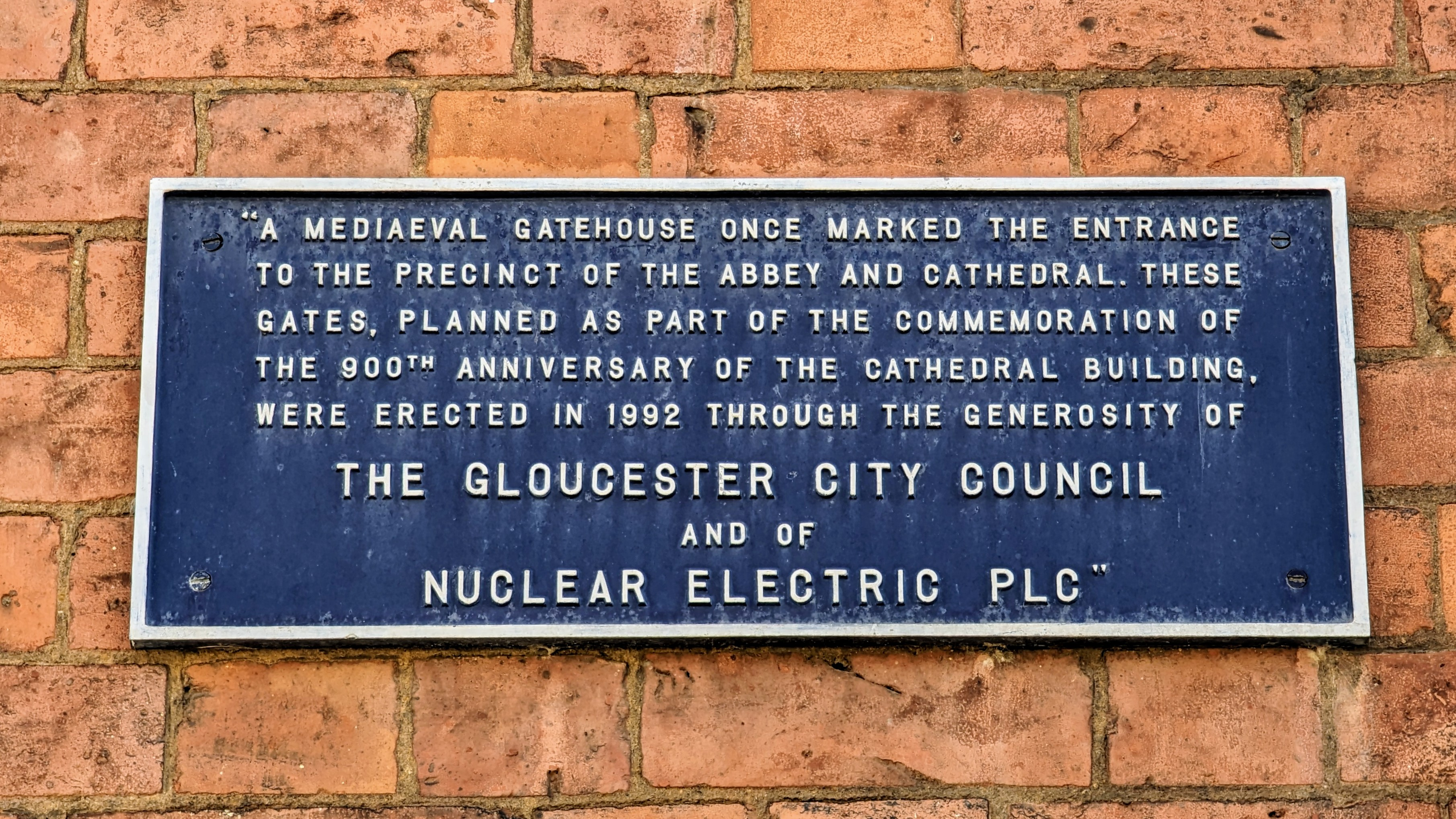
Plaque marking the erection of new gates

The remains of the gatehouse consist of a single two-storey ashlar west side wall. This was extensively repaired and in-filled with red brick in the early 19th century. On the face of the south end is a jamb of a former arched carriageway. There is a stair turret at the north end, which is faced in ashlar, and has two-light windows on the first and top floors.

The entrance doorway in the centre of the wall was added in the 18th century which serves as an entrance to the house behind the wall, it has a pointed arch containing fanlight inset with wrought-iron and Gothic tracery. The north front shows evidence of a former in-filled doorway with three stone steps to the threshold, which is now a little above street level. The interior of the house consists of early 19th century features including a stair case with stick balusters and a fireplace with reeded architrave surround.
