= St James Church, Quedgeley =

Church in Gloucestershire, England

Coordinates: 51.8258973°N 2.2833799°W

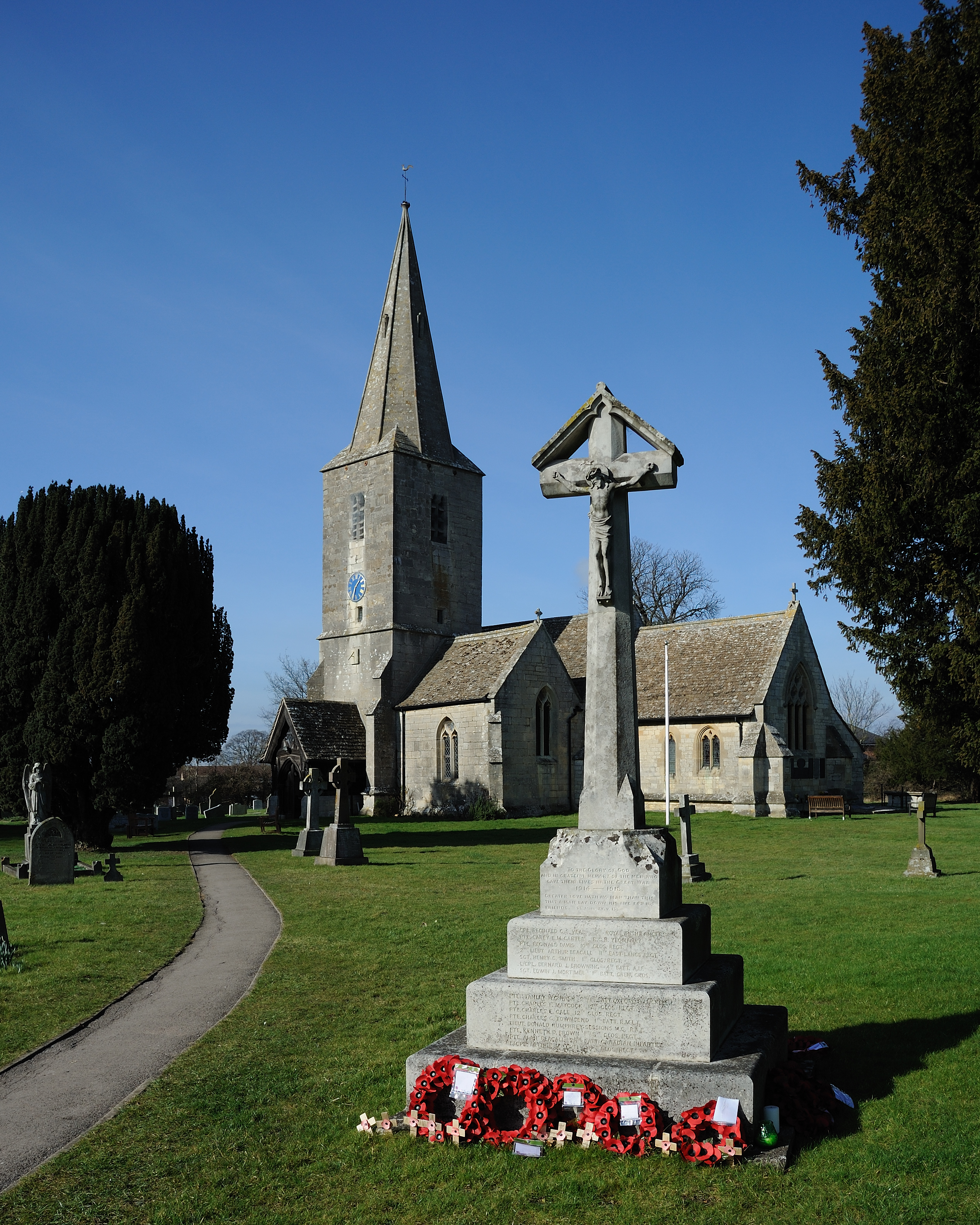
St James Church

St James Church is a Church of England church in School Lane, Quedgeley, Gloucester, Gloucestershire, England. It was designated as a Grade II listed building in January 1955.

== History ==
There was a chapel on the site before 1095, when the parish of Quedgeley was formed. In the 12th century, Margaret Mautravers gave land to the chapel upon which the church was built. At this time it was also known as St. Mary Magdalene.

St James' Church itself was built in 1210. The chancel was added in the 13th century, followed by the south aisle in the 14th century, and then the tower in the late 14th century. In 1856 the east window, made by Messrs. Hardman showing the Resurrection and Crucifixion, was installed. In 1857 the chancel and nave were rebuilt, and the north aisle was added; these were designed by H. Woodyer. Also at this time the pews, and baptismal font were added. The vestry was added around 1887, at the same time as the organ chamber and the south-facing porch on the tower.

== Architecture ==
Flag of St James Church Quedgeley, flown outside the church

The building is made from ashlar with a Cotswold stone roof. The opening between the nave and north aisle consists of three bays in the 13th century style. There is an Elizabethan style panelled roof with styled bosses and the Arnold and Barrow families coat of arms.

The undecorated circular font, from the 12th Century, is contained within octagonal stone with mosaic panels.

In the south aisle the east window consists of ancient medieval glass with ornamental stone surroundings.
