= St Barnabas Church, Gloucester =

St Barnabas Church
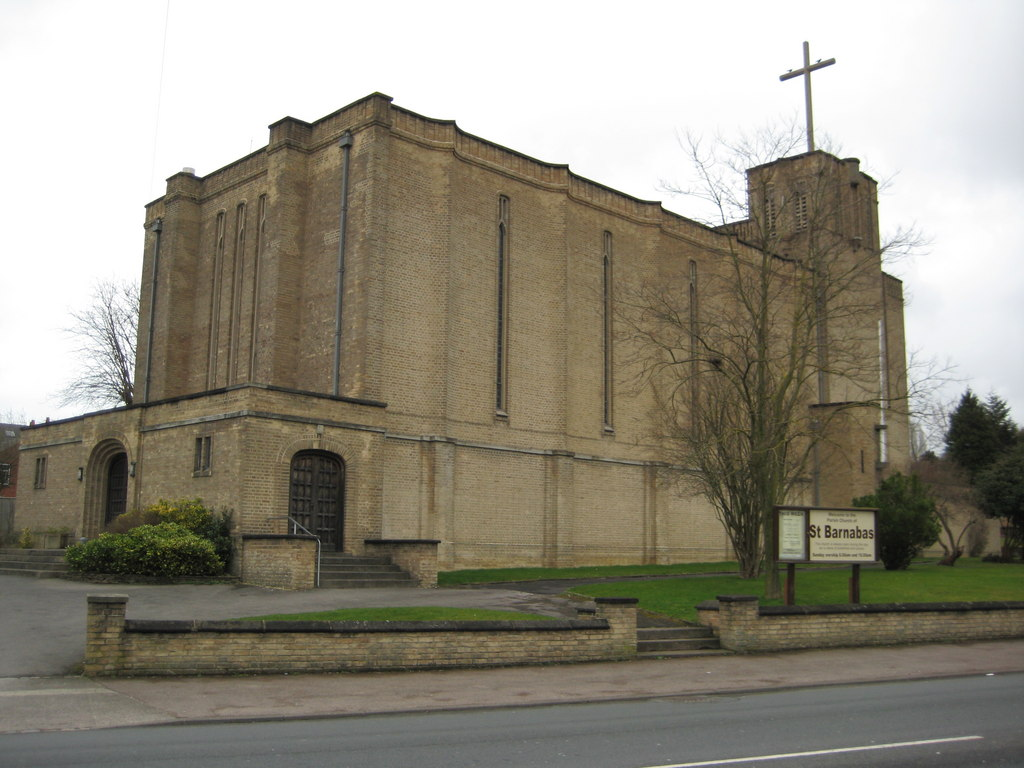
- St Barnabas Church
- 51.840634°N 2.242951°W
- Location: Gloucester, Gloucestershire
- Country: England
- Denomination: Church of England

Architecture
- Functional status: Active

Administration
- Archdiocese: Gloucester
- Diocese: Gloucester

St Barnabas Church is a Grade II* listed building located in Stroud Road, Gloucester, Gloucestershire, England. It was built in 1938–40 and obtained its Grade II status on 9 March 1982. The church's denomination is the Church of England.

== History ==
As the population of the Tuffley area expanded in the early 20th century, the “Tuffley Conventional District” was formed in 1907, mostly from the Parish of St Paul's but also including parts of Matson and Hempstead. After the Tuffley School moved to its new building on Calton Road, its former building, built in 1881, was consecrated as a church and dedicated to Saint Barnabas, who had accompanied Saint Paul.

It had become overcrowded by World War I, but postwar costs precluded the construction of a permanent church. In 1922, a large wooden building was constructed next to the old school, which became the temporary church of St Barnabas. This building is still present today and is used for various church activities.

In 1930, St Barnabas’ became its own independent parish, and its first vicar, Rev. Thomas W. Lambert, set about fundraising for a permanent church. The stone church standing today was designed by Nugent Cachemaille-Day and built in 1938-1940. It is built in the traditional form with some Gothic Revival architecture, with the main structure provided by a reinforced concrete frame. It replaced not only the temporary church but St Aldate Church as well.

The choir vestry suffered a fire in June 1997. A programme of repair and refurbishment was completed in June 2002, using a combination of parishioner funds, gifts from local organisations, and a major grant from English Heritage,

== Architecture ==
The church is made from C20 concrete, and constructed in the traditional form with some Gothic elements around the windows. The style was influenced by the Liturgical Movement, and both traditional and modern materials were used. To link new with old, stones from Gloucester Cathedral and Tewkesbury Abbey were built into the east wall, by the high altar.

The construction itself includes reinforced frames, with external brick walls, concrete window frames, and a flat roof.

There is a single belfry tower on the South-West side, with a concrete crucifix on top. The east and west sides of the tower have supporting corbels, and there are two windows on each of the four sides.

== Internal layout ==
The entrance to the building is on the northwest side and leads into a porch. This then leads to the largest part of the church which is a long rectangular nave. The chapel is located on the north side of the building, and vestries are on the east. At the south end of the building is the pulpit with the altar and chancel, above this is the organ loft which is inside the belfry tower.
