= The Folk of Gloucester =

Coordinates: 51.8672°N 2.2502°W

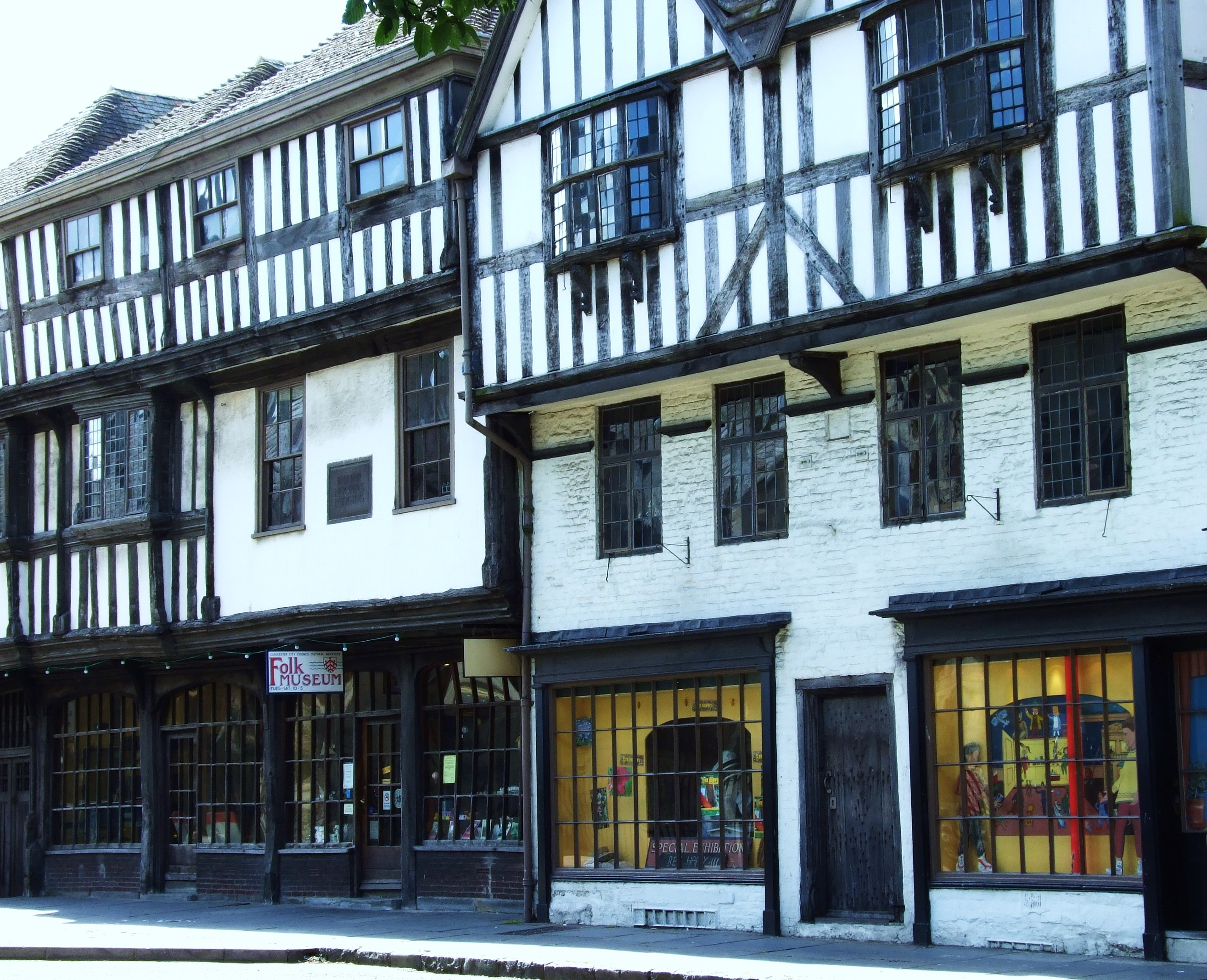
The museum in 2010

The Folk of Gloucester is a community centre which is housed in three of the oldest buildings in the city of Gloucester, two Tudor merchant's house and a 17th-century town house. The community centre, at 99–103 Westgate Street, is devoted to the social history of Gloucestershire.

Bishop Hooper is said to have lodged in the buildings now occupied by the community centre the night before he was burned at the stake in front of St Mary de Lode Church in 1555.

The community centre was called Gloucester Folk Museum before rebranding itself in 2016. It was bought by The Civic Trust in 2020, being turned from a museum into a community centre. and then became Gloucester Life until it rebranded itself again in 2019.

== Exhibits ==
Exhibits include:

- Local crafts
- Items relating to the River Severn fisheries
- Historic costumes
- A reconstructed Victorian classroom
- A reconstruction of the pin factory that once operated on the premises
- Displays relating to domestic life over the last 500 years

== Selected publications ==
- Taylor. Guide to the Collection of Bygone Agricultural Instruments. 1950.
- Gloucester Folk Museum: A Guide to the Collections. 1963. (New edition, Chris Morris, 1986.)
- Morris, Christopher I. Dairy Farming in Gloucestershire. 1983.

== See also ==
- The Museum of Gloucester
- List of museums in Gloucestershire
