= Northgate House, Gloucester =

Coordinates: 51.867632°N 2.239437°W

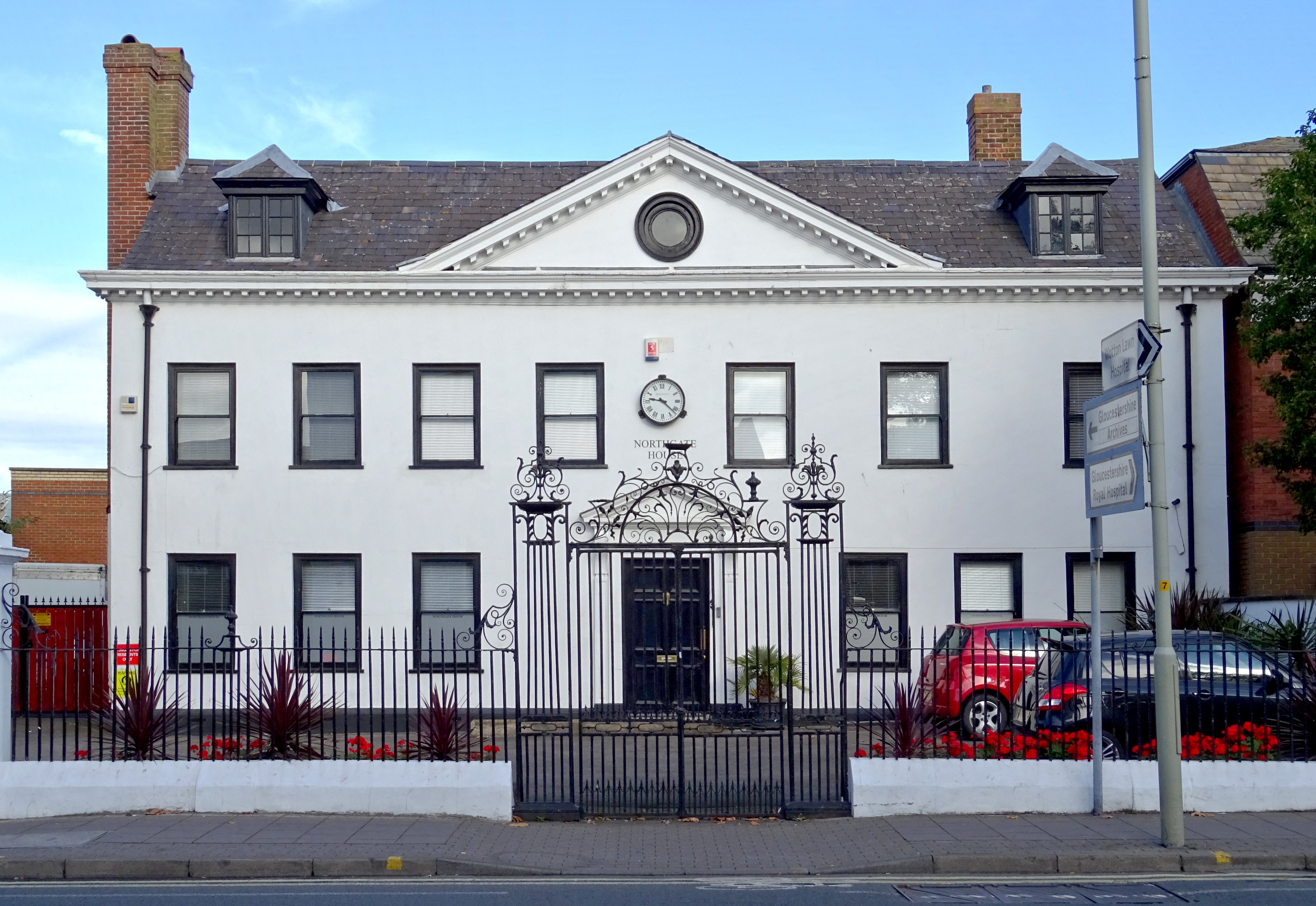
Northgate House

Northgate House is a grade II* listed building at 19 London Road in the city of Gloucester, England. It was built in the mid to late 17th-century and refronted in the mid 18th-century. It is a 2-storey stuccoed building with 8 bays, a central 4-bay pediment and pedimented doorway. A 'crude Postmodern' brick extension was added in 1988.

In 1859 it was purchased by the solicitor George Riddiford (d. 1877). It is now owned by the British government.
