= 66 Westgate Street =

Building in Gloucester, England

Coordinates: 51°52′00″N 2°14′54″W

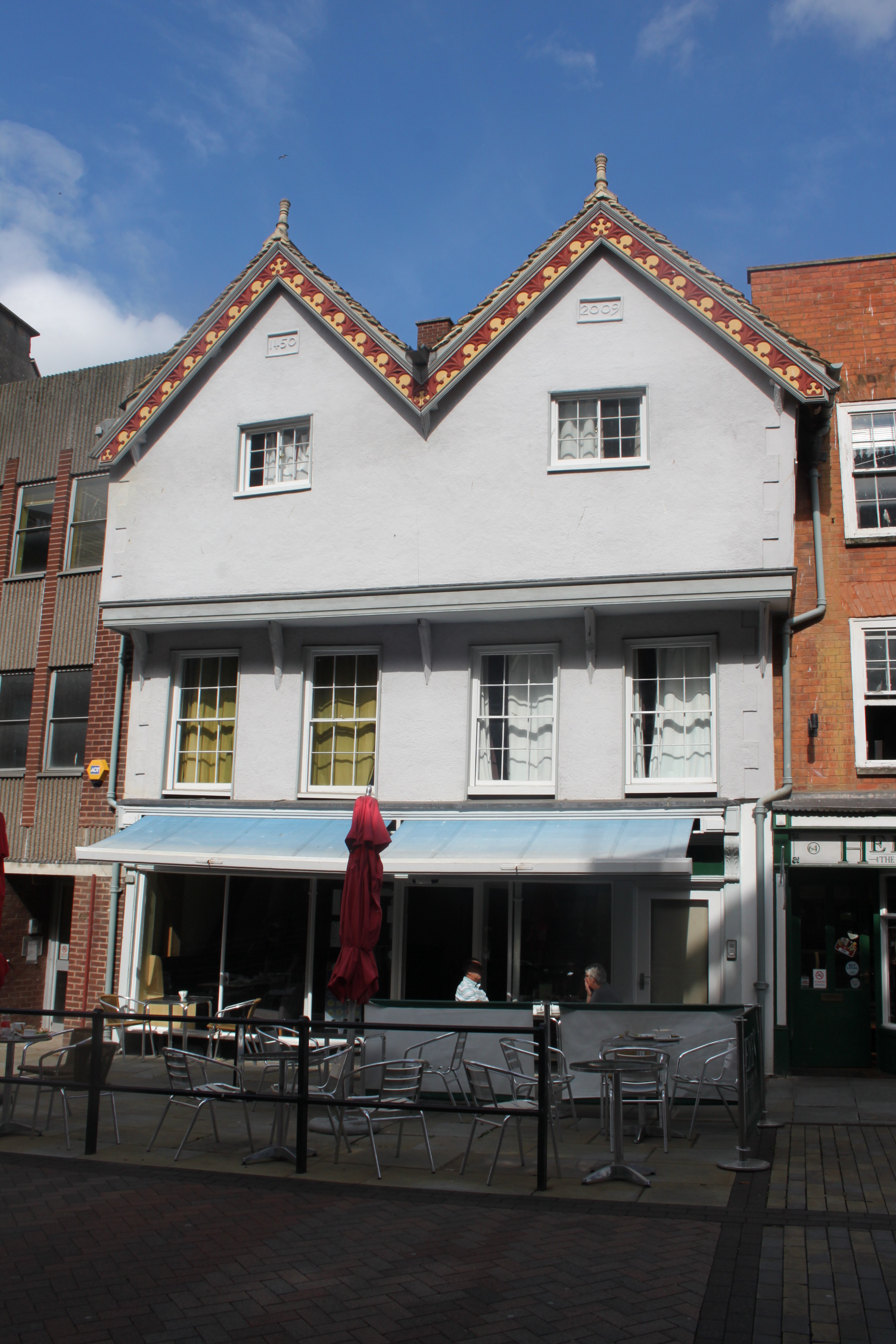
66 Westgate Street

66 Westgate Street is a grade II* listed building in Gloucester, UK. It has been listed by Historic England under the Planning (Listed Buildings and Conservation Areas) Act 1990.

Originally a merchant's house, 66 Westgate Street is thought to have been built during the 15th century but has been substantially remodelled several times in successive centuries. It is one of few surviving timber-framed houses in Gloucester, which makes it of particular historical interest. Architectural investigations have shown that it was originally attached to another house, which has since been demolished. The third storey is thought to have been added around 1600 to increase the height of the building. Cross-gabled bays were created in around 1700, and the building was a pair of shops, whose window shutters have been preserved.

The building used to house Hedley's coffee shop which closed in the summer of 2018, it will be reopen as Brimble's Café.
