= Robinswood Hill =

Hill in Gloucester, Gloucestershire

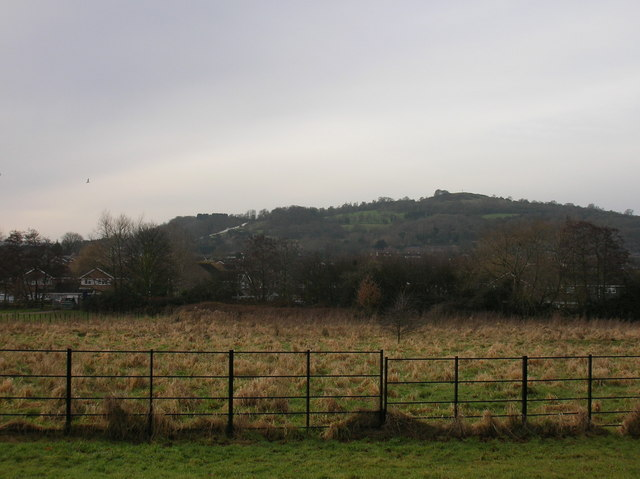
- View of Robinswood Hill

Highest point
- Elevation: 198 m (650 ft)
- Prominence: c. 141 m
- Coordinates: 51°50′01″N 02°13′57″W

Geography
- Location: Gloucestershire, England
- OS grid: SO840150

Robinswood Hill Country Park, Gloucestershire (includes Gloucestershire Wildlife Trust Headquarters)

Robinswood Hill (grid reference SO840150) is a hill and country park to the south of the city centre of Gloucester, close to the Stroud Road (A4173). It rises to 650 ft (198 m), and is owned and managed by Gloucester City Council's Countryside Unit. The Gloucestershire Wildlife Trust also has its head office based here.

It was originally one of the main sources of water to the city. The springs rising on Robin's Wood Hill were used by Gloucester Abbey in the 13th century. Reservoirs were built by the Gloucester Water Company in 1837-8 and taken over by the city in 1855. Robinswood Hill ceased to provide water supply in 1924 but the reservoirs remained in use for storage until 1946; they have now been backfilled to provide car parks and a countryside centre for the thousands of visitors that use the hill for recreation and inspiration. It is home to several species of wildlife, and has views of the surrounding area - including other hills of Gloucester, the Cotswolds, Malvern Hills, May Hill and on a clear day the Severn Bridges.

The country park itself is a 100-hectare (250-acre) site. On the eastern side of the Hill is a dry ski slope and golf course complex. The park is a Local Nature Reserve, and an area called Robin's Wood Hill Quarry is a Site of Special Scientific Interest.
