= Bristol Road =

Road in Gloucester, United Kingdom

Coordinates: 51°51′10.97″N 2°15′18.76″W

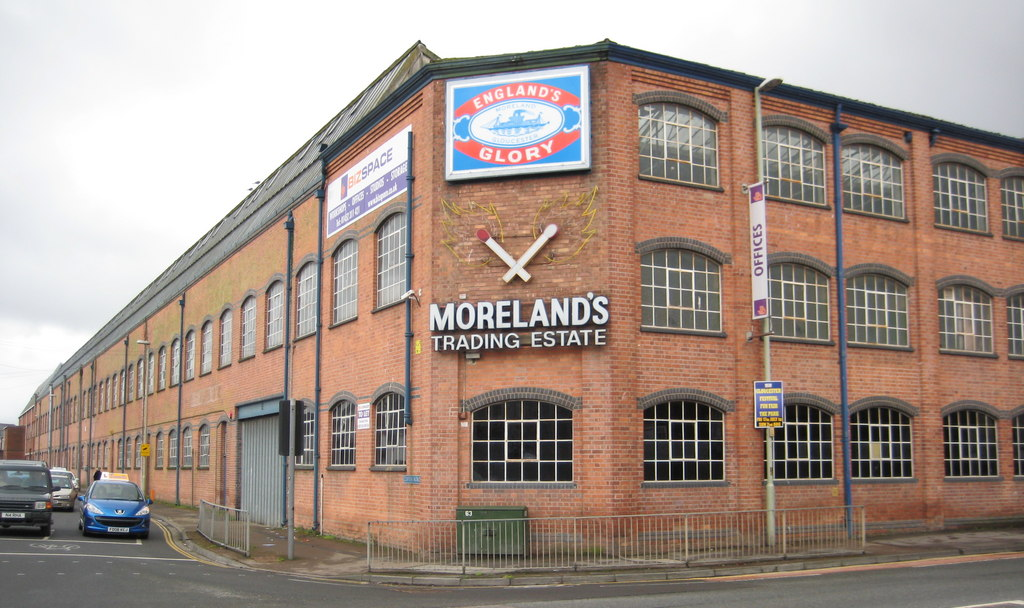
The former Moreland's match factory

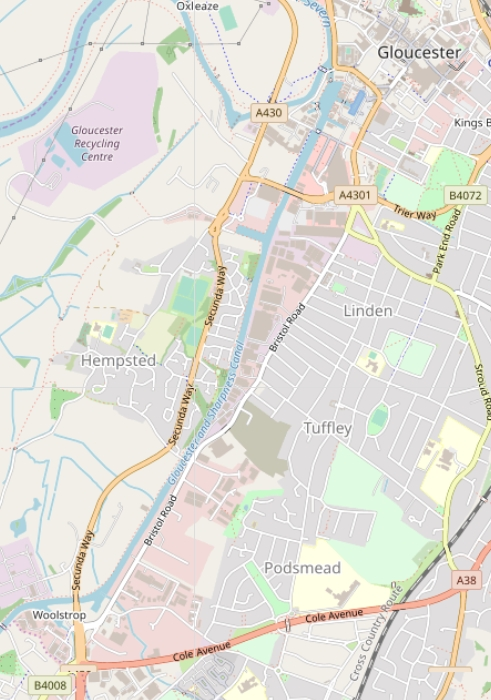
Bristol Road north

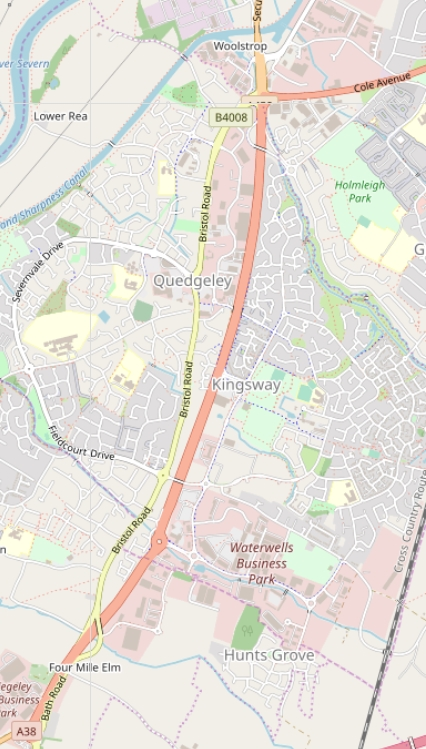
Bristol Road south

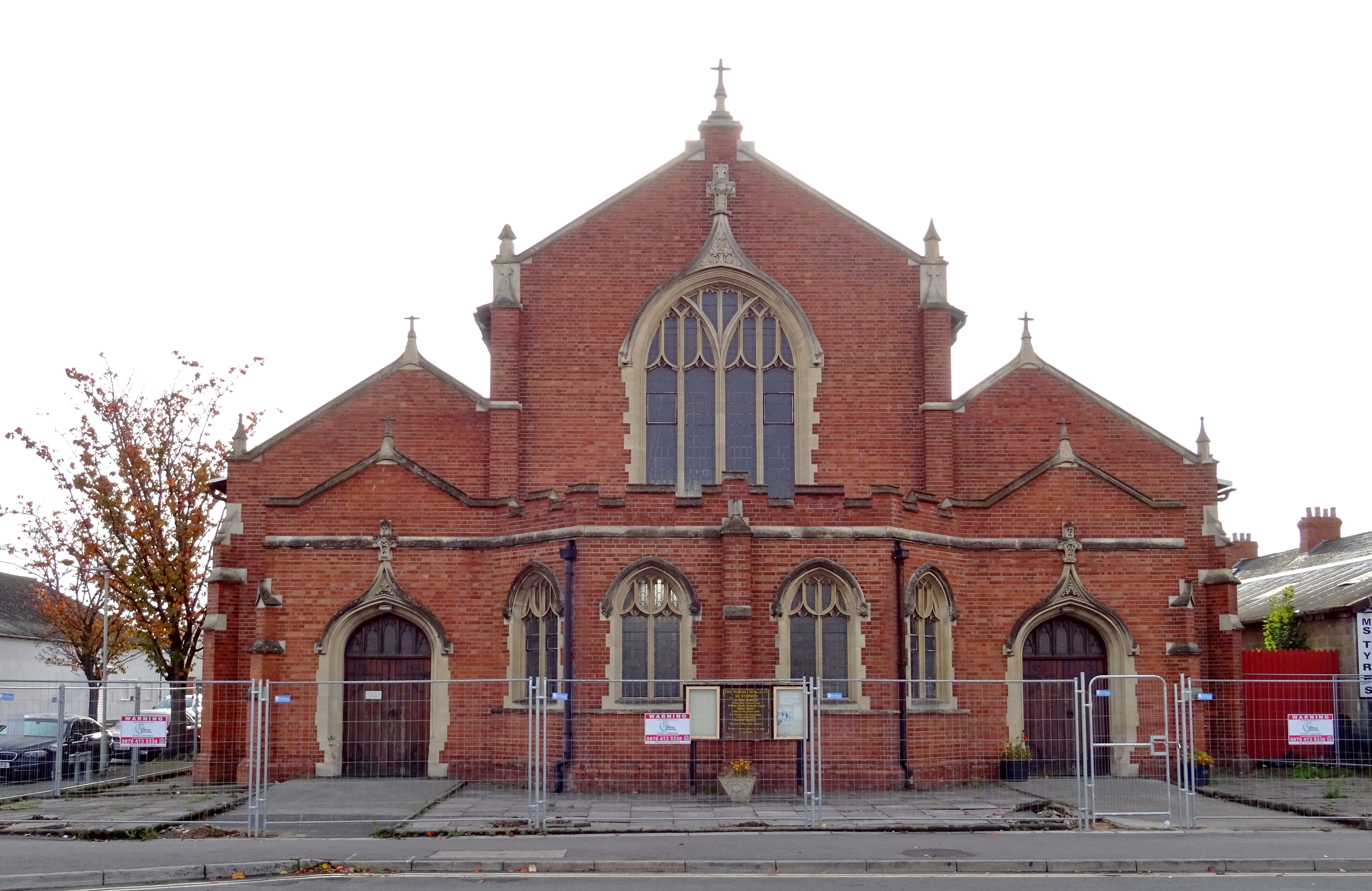
St Stephen's Church in 2018

Bristol Road in the City of Gloucester dates from the medieval period. It runs between Southgate Street in the north and Quedgeley in the south where it joins the Bath Road and the A38. It contains a number of listed buildings and other notable structures.

== History ==
Bristol Road was one of the significant roads into the City of Gloucester from the medieval period, joining it to the City of Bristol. Later, as Gloucester expanded, the northernmost part of Bristol Road became known as lower Southgate Street.

== Listed buildings and structures ==
Listed buildings and structures in Bristol Road, north to south, are:

- Norfolk Buildings, designed by Thomas Fulljames, 1836.
- Gloucester & Sharpness Canal Milepost
- The Little Thatch, 14th-century timber-framed house.
- Forge Thatch Cottage, 17th-century timber-framed house.
- Milestone, 19th-century, iron.
- Packers Cottage, Quedgeley.
- Laura Croft, 17th-century timber-framed house.
- Milestone, 19th-century, iron.
- Lodge to Hardwicke Court
- Road Farmhouse, Hardwicke.
- Milestone, Hardwicke, 19th-century, iron.

== Other buildings ==
- Gloucester Railway Carriage and Wagon Company (no longer exists)
- Moreland's Match Factory, makers of "England's Glory" matches.
- St Stephen's Church (formerly St Luke the Less) The church contains two First World War memorials. One to the men of the parish who died and a second to the men of Morelands match factory who died which was transferred from the factory.

== See also ==
- High Orchard
