= Moland House =

Historic house in Pennsylvania, United States

- U.S. National Register of Historic Places
- Pennsylvania state historical marker
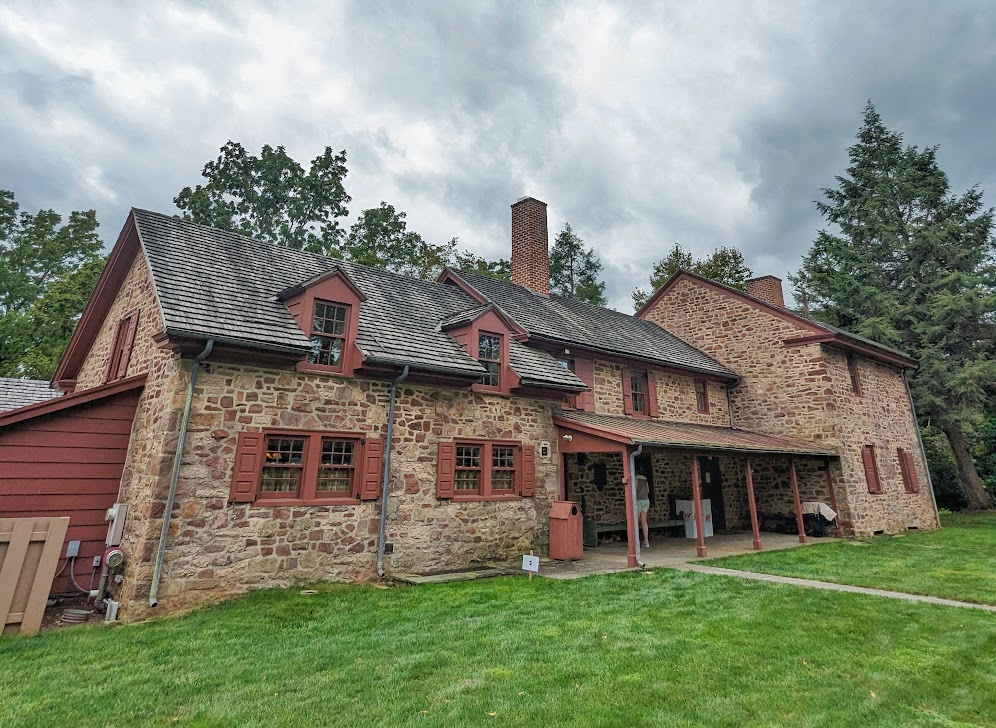
- Moland House, August 2023.

- Location within Pennsylvania Location within the United States
- Location: 1641 Old York Rd., Hartsville, Pennsylvania
- Coordinates: 40°14′10″N 75°5′34″W
- Area: 1 acre (0.40 ha)
- Built: 1750
- Architectural style: Georgian
- NRHP reference No.: 89000352

Significant dates
- Added to NRHP: May 19, 1989
- Designated PHMC: October 21, 1947

Moland House (also known as Washington's Headquarters Farm) is an old stone farmhouse built around 1750, by John Moland (b. 1700 London, England d. 1761), a Philadelphia and Bucks County lawyer. Although physically located in Hartsville, Warwick Township, Bucks County, Pennsylvania, its mailing address is in Warminster Township, Pennsylvania.

The house served as the headquarters for General George Washington during the American Revolutionary War from August 10 to 23, 1777 while on the way to the Battle of Brandywine. The encampment stretched along both sides of Old York Road, on the slope of Carr's hill to the north; both sides of Bristol Road from Mearns Road to Meetinghouse Road. The Battle of Crooked Billet ended near here on May 1, 1778.

Moland House is owned by Warwick Township and is being restored and maintained by the Warwick Township Historical Society through grants from Warwick Township, the Commonwealth of Pennsylvania, and the federal government, plus by private foundations and individual donors. Restoration began in 1997, and although it is nearly complete, a number of projects remain to be funded.

== History ==
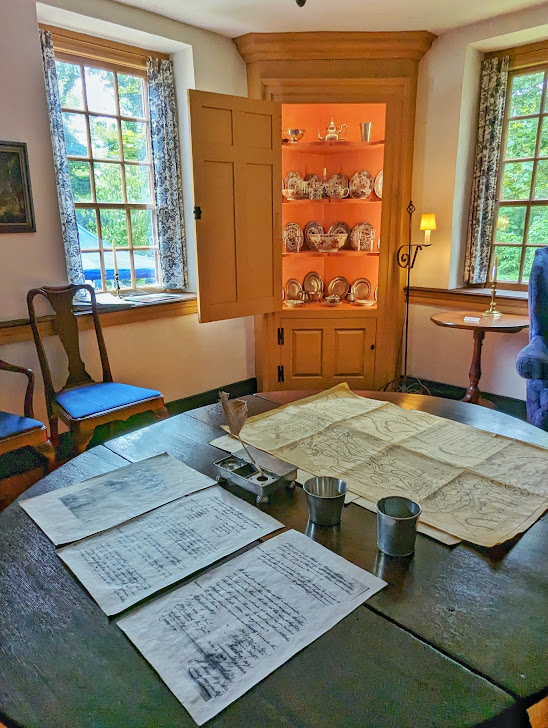
Moland house interior with replication of Washington's Plan for the Battle of Brandywine signed by his Generals

In the early evening of August 10, 1777, 11,000 Continental Army and militia soldiers were marching up York Road towards the Cross Roads with Bristol Road (which is known today as Hartsville, PA) on their way to Coryell's Ferry (now New Hope), intending to camp four miles beyond the Delaware River in New Jersey.

General George Washington received a dispatch from John Hancock, President of the Second Continental Congress, which told Washington that the 260-vessel British fleet, hauling 17,000 British Army and Hessian troops under General William Howe, was fifty miles south of the Delaware Capes (Cape May and Cape Henlopen) on August 7.

Unsure and wary of Howe's intentions, Washington immediately halted his force to encamp around the bridge over the Little Neshaminy Creek in Warwick Twp. Knowing the area and having ridden through only ten days earlier, he selected the substantial stone dwelling of Widow Moland as his headquarters on the farm north of the bridge. General Washington held a "Council of War" with his four major generals and six brigadier generals in the Moland House.

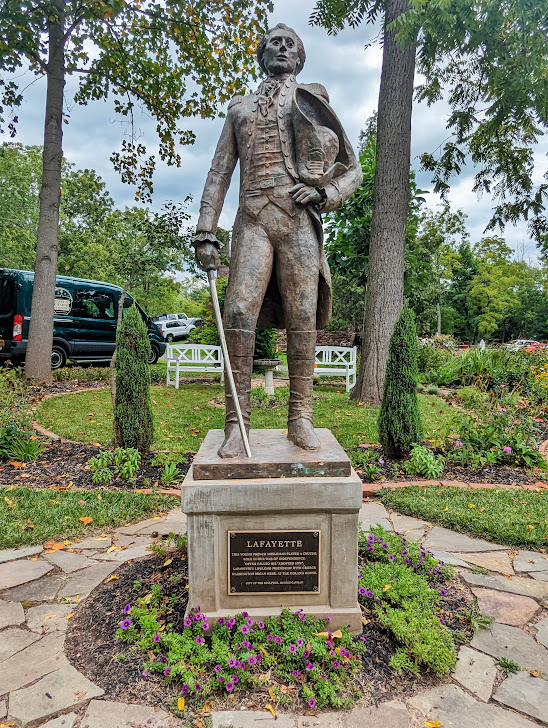
Lafayette statue in the Colonial-style garden at Moland house

While in Warwick Township the Betsy Ross flag, an American flag that was allegedly designed by Betsy Ross, was first presented to General Washington. Verbal history of the area alleges that the encampment was the site where the American flag was first flown. It was also here that the Marquis de Lafayette and Count Casimir Pulaski joined the American Revolution and distinguished themselves soon at the Battle of Brandywine and for many years thereafter in the fight for American freedom from England.

During the late 19th and early 20th centuries, the Moland House was recognized as an important landmark, however, it did remain a private residence. The Moland house was the site of meetings of history-interested groups during the first half of the 20th century. Members of Sons of the Revolution met there in 1903 and a group of French educators and military officers taking part in the Lafayette College Centennial Celebration met there 1932.

During the 1960s or early 1970s the Moland House ceased to be a private residence and became a rooming house. According to local residents, as a rooming house, it was frequented by members of motorcycle gangs. It fell into disrepair and was abandoned by 1985. It was then that a concerned group of local citizens began to take action and in concert with a local housing developer and local authorities, rescued Moland House.

== Historical marker ==
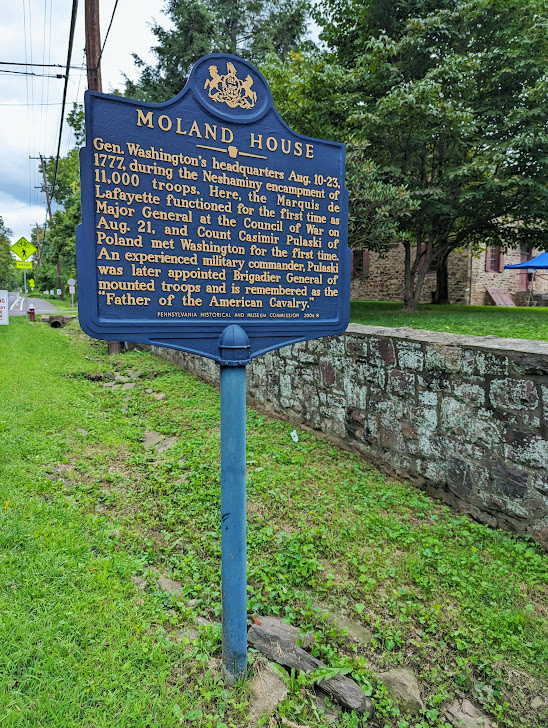
Moland House Pennsylvania historical marker

Marker Text:

Gen. Washington's headquarters Aug. 10-23, 1777, during the Neshaminy encampment of 11,000 troops. Here, the Marquis de Lafayette functioned for the first time as Major General at the Council of War on Aug. 21, and Count Casimir Pulaski of Poland met Washington for the first time. An experienced military commander, Pulaski was later appointed Brigadier General of mounted troops and is remembered as the "Father of the American Cavalry."

== Preservation ==
Preservation of the Moland house is in the hands of the Warwick Township Historical Society, P.O. Box 107, Jamison, PA 18929–0107.

Archaeological studies on the Moland House property have been performed by the Millbrook Society of Hatboro, PA., a non-profit organization, whose archaeological projects at the Moland House have included excavations, geophysical scanning, and the analysis of building features. You may find their reports under ARCHAEOLOGY at Millbrooksociety.

== See also ==
- List of Washington's Headquarters during the Revolutionary War
