= Norfolk Buildings =

Terrace of houses in Gloucester, England

Coordinates: 51°51′16″N 2°15′11″W

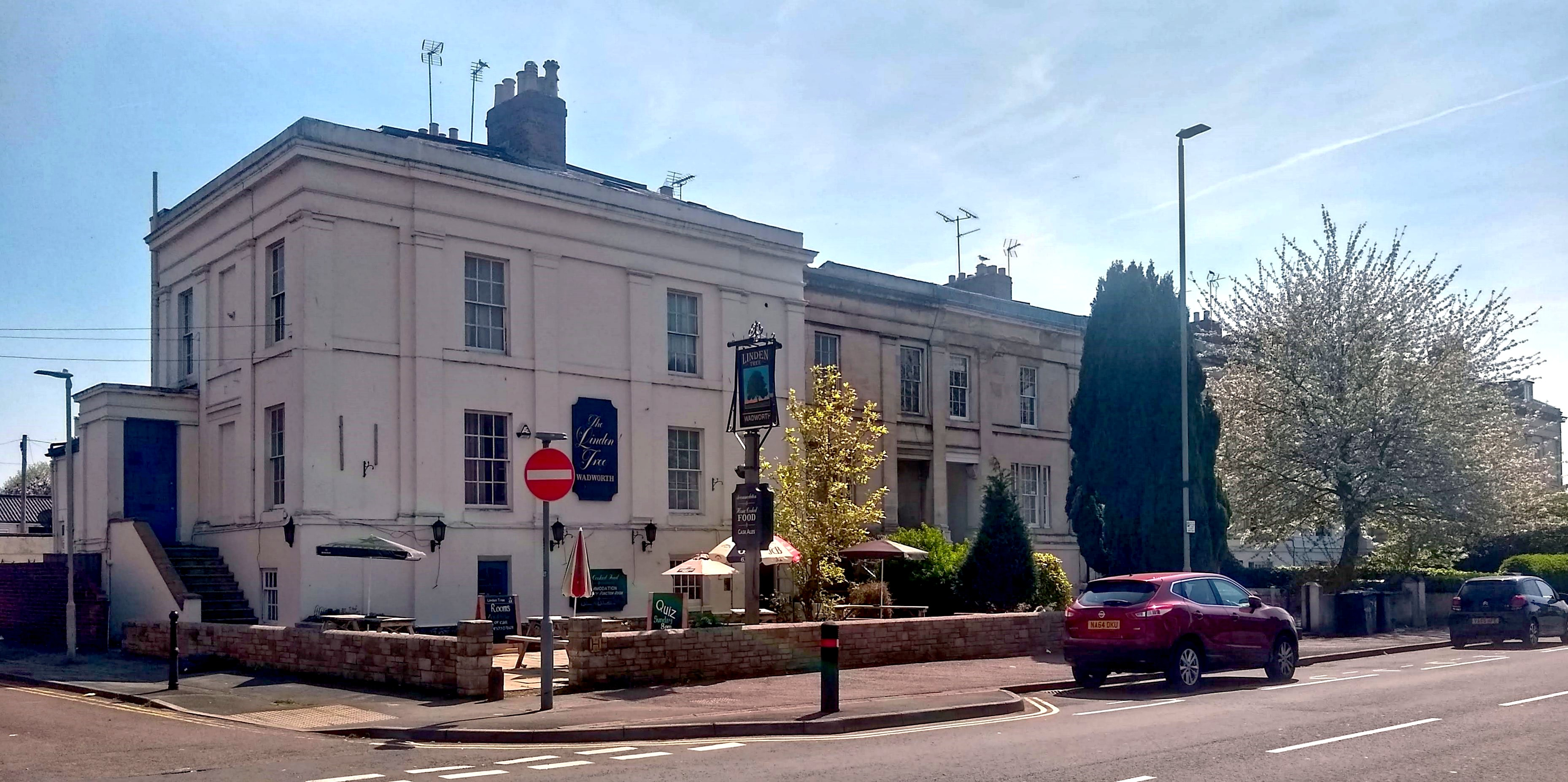
The Linden Tree

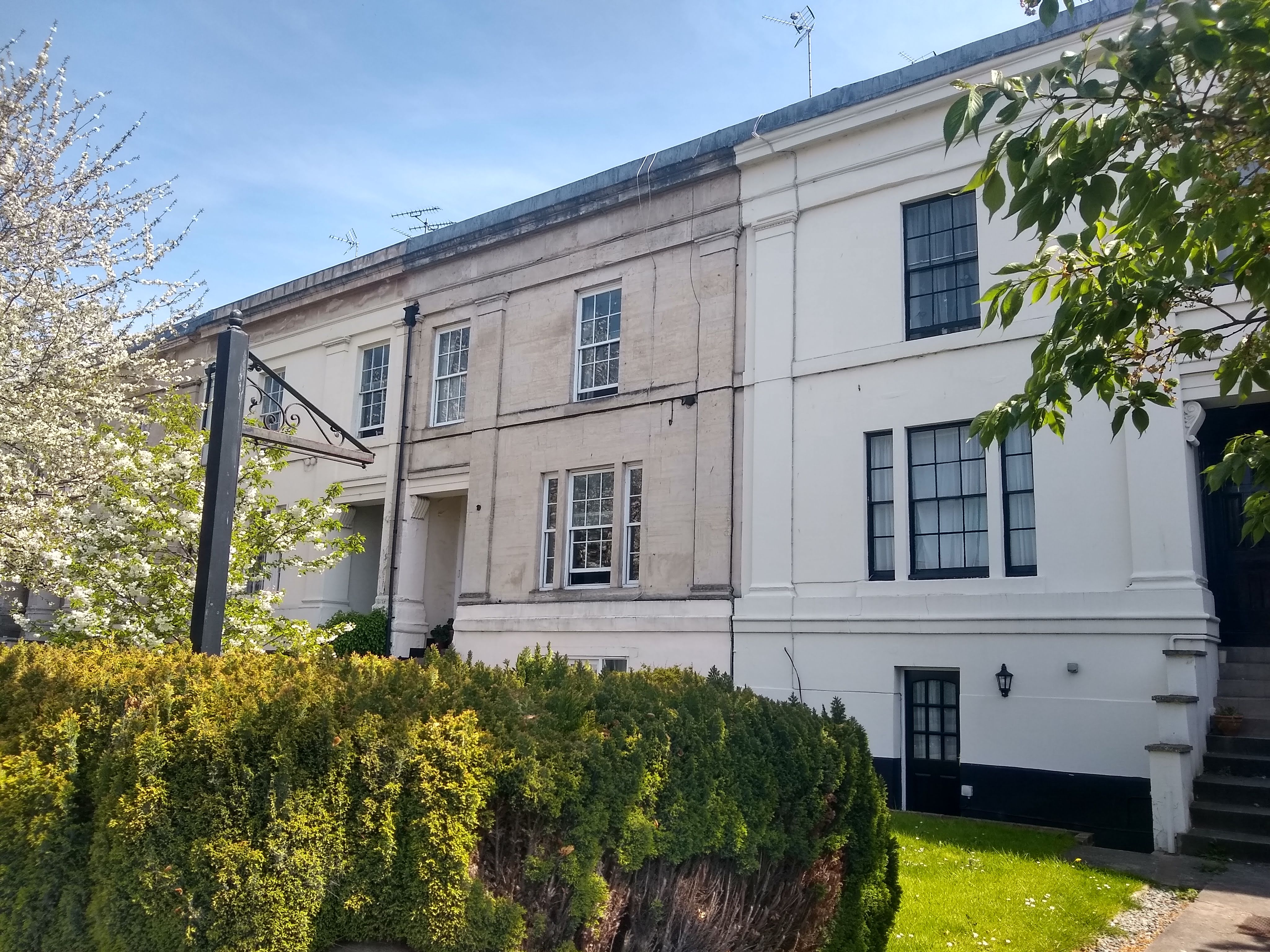
Norfolk Buildings, centre terrace.

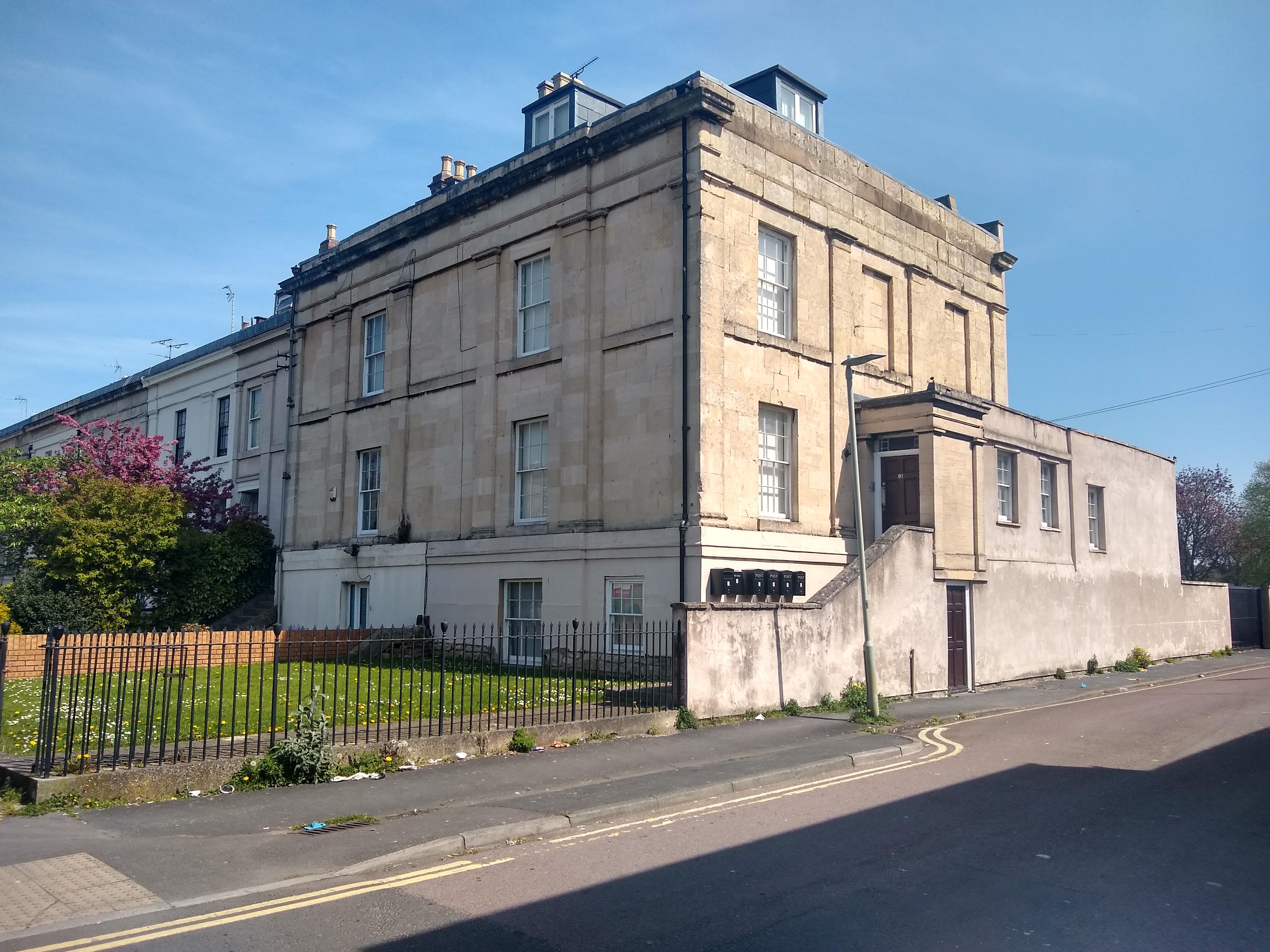
Norfolk Buildings, south end.

Norfolk Buildings is a terrace of grade II listed houses at 73-91 Bristol Road, Gloucester, on the east side between Theresa Street and Alma Place.

The buildings were begun in 1836 to a design by the architect Thomas Fulljames in the Greek Revival style for the reverend Samuel Lysons of nearby Hempsted Court. It was originally known as Theresa Place. In 1829 they were described by the local writer George Worrall Counsel as "a very handsome row of elegant houses". The north end of the terrace was the Norfolk House Hotel but is now The Linden Tree pub under the management of Wadworth Brewery. To the rear of the buildings is Alma Terrace.

Lysons also developed houses from 1854 in Theresa Street, originally known as Clarence Town, and Alma Place. Lysons Avenue is a short distance to the south.
