= Bridge Valley Bridge =

- U.S. National Register of Historic Places
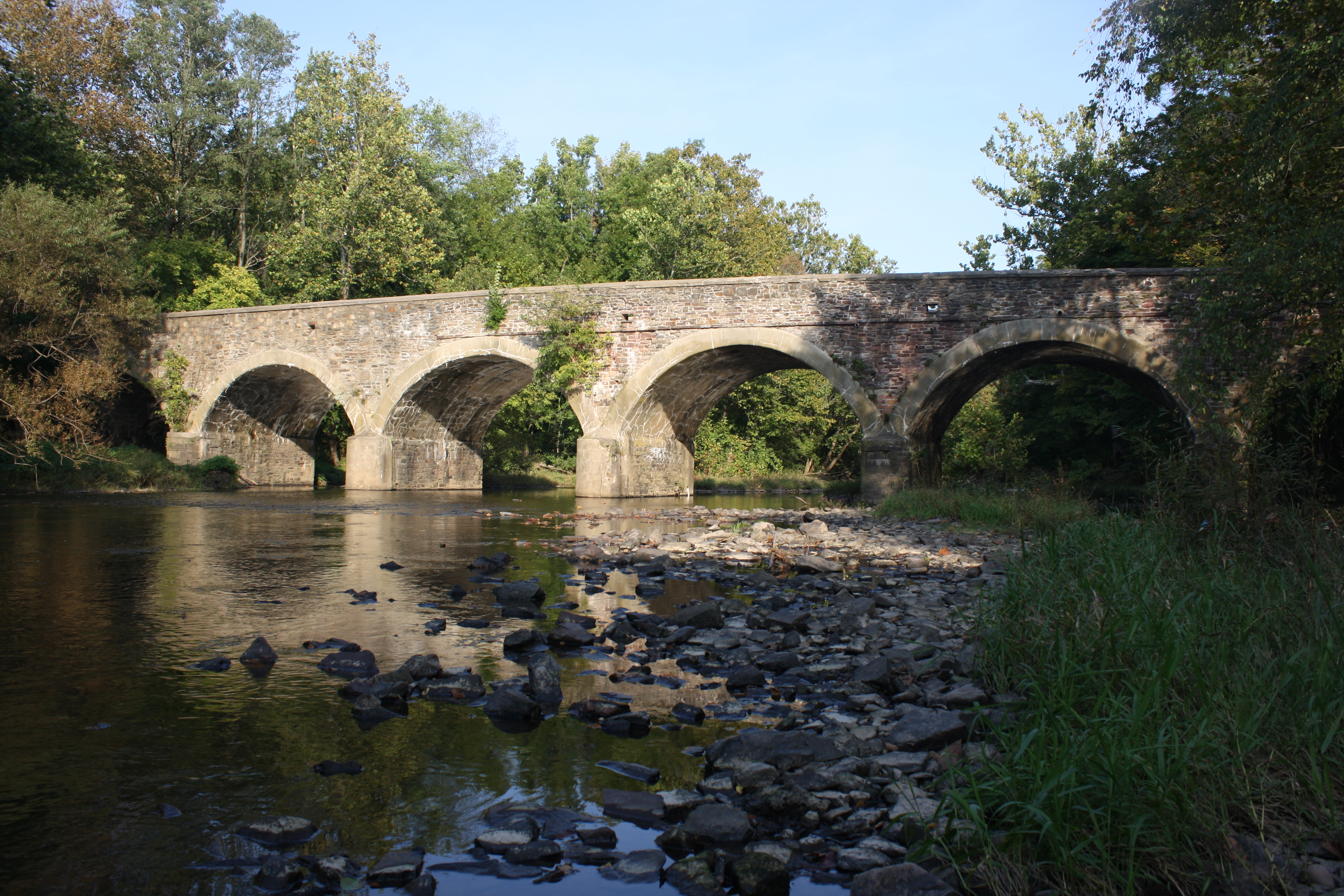
- Bridge Valley Bridge, September 2012

- Location within Pennsylvania Location within the United States
- Location: Spans Neshaminy Creek north of Hartsville, Pennsylvania
- Coordinates: 40.2762°N 75.0832°W
- Area: 0.1 acres (0.040 ha)
- Built: 1804
- Built by: Phillip Millar
- Architectural style: Neo-Classical Arched Bridge
- NRHP reference No.: 84003120
- Added to NRHP: May 10, 1984

Bridge Valley Bridge, also known as Pettit's Bridge and Eight-Arch Bridge, is an historic stone arch bridge located in Warwick Township, Bucks County, Pennsylvania, United States. It crosses Neshaminy Creek. It is eight spans, each 27 feet long, and was constructed in 1804. It is constructed of ashlar stone with rubble and dirt infill. It remained in vehicular use until 1970.

It was listed on the National Register of Historic Places in 1984.

== Gallery ==
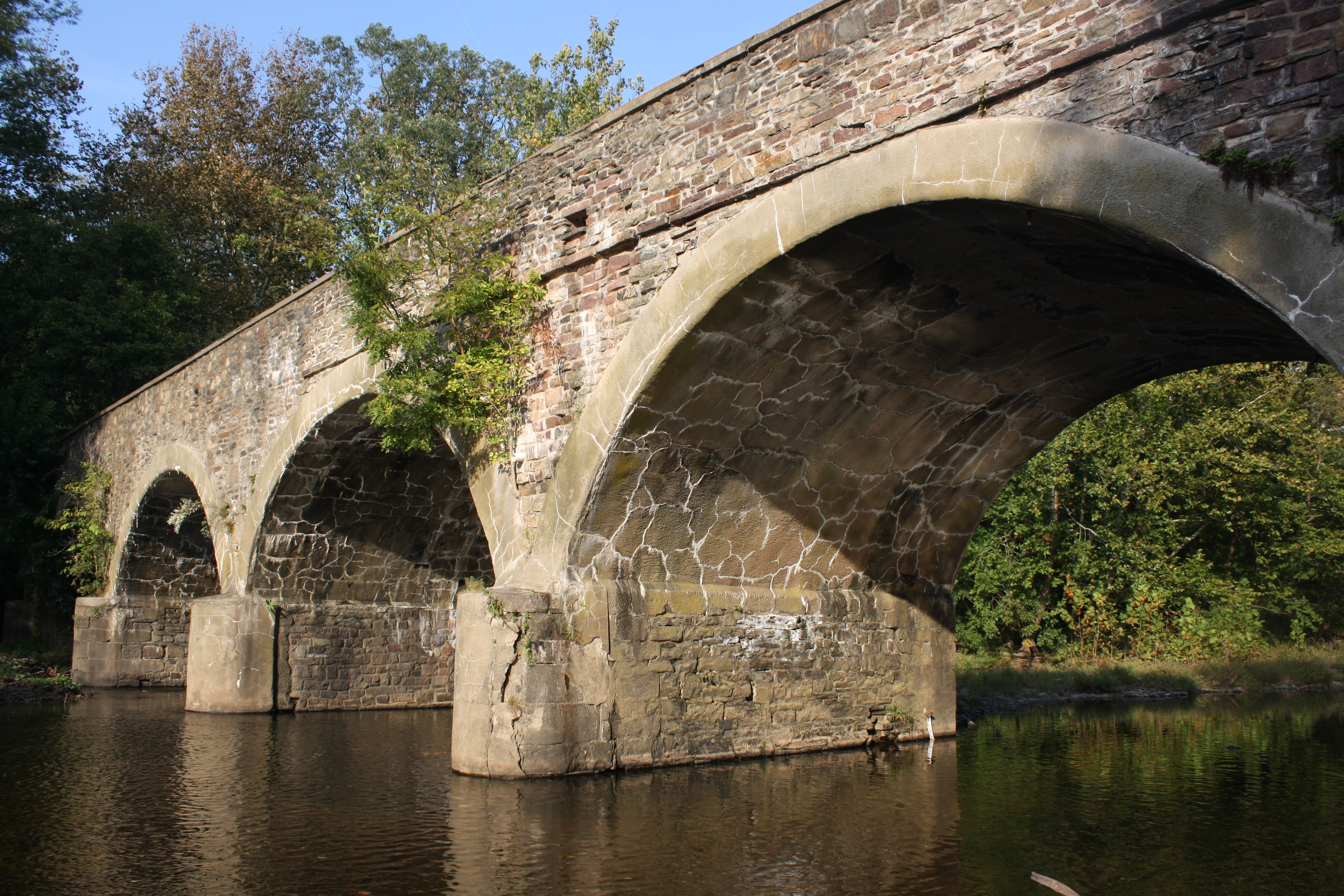
File:Bridge Valley Bridge closeup, September 2012
