= Bromford Flagship LiveWest =

- Formation: January 29, 2026
- Type: Housing association
- Location: Tewkesbury, Gloucestershire, England
- Region served: East, Central and South West England
- Services: Affordable housing, property management, community development
- Key people: Jac Starr (Chair); Robert Nettleton (CEO); Paul Crawford (strategic advisor)
- Employees: 4,800
- Website: bfl-places.co.uk

Bromford Flagship LiveWest (BFL) is a housing association operating in England, formed through the merger of Bromford Flagship and LiveWest on 29 January 2026. The organisation owns and manages approximately 120,000 homes across east, central and south west England, making it one of the largest housing providers in the United Kingdom. The organisation serves approximately 300,000 customers.

The merger unlocked approximately £3.4 billion in additional financial capacity by 2040 (comprising £1.9 billion from the original Bromford-Flagship merger in February 2025 and £1.5 billion from the LiveWest merger), positioning BFL to deliver over 50,000 new homes by 2040, including around 7,000 more than would have been possible as Bromford Flagship or LiveWest alone.

== History ==
=== Formation ===
Bromford Flagship was created by bringing together two established housing associations with complementary strengths and geographical coverage. Bromford Housing Association was founded in 1963, named after Bromford Bridge railway station in Birmingham. The merger was completed on 28 February 2025 following regulatory approvals and stakeholder engagement, with the strategic rationale focused on unlocking additional capacity to deliver more affordable homes at a time of acute housing need across England.

Bromford Housing Group Limited was renamed Bromford Flagship Limited to serve as the group parent, whilst Flagship Housing Group Limited became Flagship Housing Limited, operating as a wholly owned subsidiary. Both the Bromford and Flagship brands continue to operate as part of the enlarged group.

In May 2025, the Regulator of Social Housing awarded Bromford Flagship a G1 grade for governance and V1 grade for financial viability, the highest regulatory ratings available.

=== LiveWest merger ===
In January 2026, Bromford Flagship completed a merger with LiveWest, a housing association operating primarily in south west England. The combined organisation was renamed Bromford Flagship LiveWest (BFL), serving approaching 300,000 customers across east, central and south west England.

BFL became the group parent, with Bromford, Flagship and LiveWest continuing as landlords and employers. The merger unlocked an additional £1.5 billion in capacity between 2026 and 2040, adding to the £1.9 billion unlocked by the original Bromford-Flagship merger, giving a combined total of £3.4 billion in additional financial capacity.

Chief Executive Robert Nettleton said: "By bringing Bromford Flagship and LiveWest together, we're unlocking an additional £1.5 billion in capacity between now and 2040. That means we can deliver over 50,000 new homes by 2040, including around 7,000 more than would have been possible as Bromford Flagship or LiveWest alone."

== Operations ==
=== Housing and development ===
BFL manages approximately 120,000 homes across east, central and south west England, employing around 4,800 colleagues and serving 300,000 customers. In the 2024-25 financial year, Bromford Flagship completed 1,770 new homes, of which 1,698 were affordable homes. Of these, 519 units were designated for social rent, the most affordable rental tenure available. This proportion of social rent homes is relatively high for the sector.

The organisation invested £134 million during 2024–25 to upgrade existing homes, including improvements to kitchens, bathrooms, windows, roofs and heating systems. Bromford Flagship established a development pipeline of 6,500 homes and expanded its in-house construction capability, delivering 207 homes through this route in 2024–25.

The organisation reduced outstanding repairs by 54% during the year, reaching its lowest open repair level in three years. Progress has been made on energy efficiency, with 79% of homes now meeting Energy Performance Certificate (EPC) rating C or above, helping customers reduce energy bills.

=== Customer engagement and community support ===
The organisation achieved an 80% customer satisfaction rating according to the Regulator of Social Housing's Tenant Satisfaction Measures in 2024–25, with 88% of customers reporting they feel safe in their homes and 87% feeling treated fairly and with respect. These results place Bromford Flagship in the top quartile of housing associations across key measures.

The organisation is developing a place-based approach to its work, which goes beyond traditional housing management to focus on creating thriving communities. During 2024–25, three place pilots were launched in South Gloucestershire, South Lichfield and North Cotswolds, designed around local priorities and co-created with customers. Early results showed reduced anti-social behaviour, faster repair times and improved local engagement.

Through its Hopestead charitable subsidiary, the organisation's Hope at Home Programme supported 670 customers who had previously experienced homelessness, providing furniture and white goods worth £1.1 million, enabling 97% to sustain their tenancies. During 2024–25, the organisation spent £136,000 on essentials such as food, energy and white goods for customers facing financial hardship, whilst colleagues helped customers secure nearly £590,000 in additional income.

== Financial performance ==
In 2024–25, Bromford Flagship reported turnover of £607 million, representing an increase from £567 million in the previous year. The organisation's operating surplus rose from £200 million to £215 million, with net surplus increasing to £136 million from £125 million. The organisation's social housing operating margin was 33%, amongst the leading levels in the housing association sector. Investment in new housing properties totalled £359 million.

The organisation holds A2 and A+ credit ratings from Moody's and S&P Global Ratings respectively, which were reaffirmed following the merger in March 2025. These dual credit ratings are amongst the strongest in the housing association sector. In June 2025, Bromford Flagship established a Euro Medium-Term Note (EMTN) programme to support plans to raise over £4 billion over 15 years to fund the development of approximately 2,000 new homes annually.

In July 2025, the organisation issued its first bond under this programme, raising £300 million through a 25-year sustainable bond. The bond was four times oversubscribed and priced at government gilts plus 0.82%, representing the housing association sector's tightest spread in four years.

== Leadership ==
Jac Starr, former chair of LiveWest, serves as chair of the Bromford Flagship LiveWest board. Robert Nettleton, previously chief executive of Bromford Housing Group, continues as chief executive officer of the merged organisation. Paul Crawford, former chief executive of LiveWest Homes Limited, stepped down from that role to become Strategic Advisor.
