= Kingsway Village =

Area of Gloucester, England

Coordinates: 51.8208514°N 2.2709542°W

- Location within Gloucestershire
- Population: 3,000
- OS grid reference: SO8132613665
- District: Gloucester
- Shire county: Gloucestershire
- Region: South West
- Country: England
- Sovereign state: United Kingdom
- Post town: GLOUCESTER
- Postcode district: GL2
- Dialling code: 01452
- Police: Gloucestershire
- Fire: Gloucestershire
- Ambulance: South Western
- UK Parliament: Gloucester

Kingsway Village is an area adjacent to the town of Quedgeley and suburb of Tuffley in Gloucester, in the ceremonial county of Gloucestershire, England. It is built upon the old RAF Quedgeley site.

Kingsway is part of Quedgeley, and is in the City Council Ward of Quedgeley Fieldcourt. As of 2016, under Gloucestershire County Council it is part of the ward of Kingsway.

The Kingsway Local Centre is a collection of shops in the middle of Kingsway.

It has a very active Residents Association which continues to host public meetings, community fun days and other local events. It also lobbies local agencies and organisations involved in the development of the area, on behalf of residents.

Many NATO military families who are now based at HQ Allied Rapid Reaction Corps in Innsworth have moved to the area.

== History ==
The land that Kingsway was built on was formerly RAF Quedgeley between 1914 and 1995. The development of the village was started in 2006 and involved Barratt Homes, Bromford Group, Bryant Homes, David Wilson Homes, George Wimpey, Miller Homes, Persimmon plc, and Taylor Wimpey.

Kingsway Primary School was opened on 20 October 2008.

The original planning application for Kingsway consisted of 30% of social housing in the village. However, in 2009 residents were angered when a revised version of the planning application was published which included 42% social housing. The figure however was reduced when NATO military families who are now based at HQ Allied Rapid Reaction Corps in Innsworth moved to the area, taking those properties instead.

Waterwells Primary Academy was opened in Kingsway in September 2013.

The Community Centre opened, in the local centre, in September 2014. The sports pavilion opened in September 2014.. These developments are part of an ongoing investment into facilities in the growing estate.

== Crime ==
Between July 2016 and June 2017, the number of criminal offences was 677, accounting for 33% of the crime in the Quedgeley, Kingsway and Hardwicke area. Of these 677, 56.57% were antisocial behaviour offences and 16.25% were Violent and Sexual offences. Crime rates in July 2017 have remained low compared to other neighbourhoods with the Quedgeley, Kingsway and Hardwicke area being ranked the third lowest out of twelve neighbourhoods in Gloucester for crime rates.
