= Jamison, Pennsylvania =

Unincorporated community in Pennsylvania, US

- Village
- Location within Pennsylvania
- Coordinates: 40°15′17″N 75°5′22″W
- Country: United States
- State: Pennsylvania
- County: Bucks
- Township: Warwick

Government
- Elevation: 305 ft (93 m)

Population (2000)
  - Total: 8,488
- Time zone: UTC-5 (Eastern (EST))
  - Summer (DST): UTC-4 (EDT)
- ZIP Code: 18929
- Area codes: 215, 267 and 445
- GNIS feature ID: 1177982

Jamison is a small village in Warwick Township, Bucks County, Pennsylvania, United States, along Pennsylvania Route 263. Its ZIP Code is 18929. Jamison Elementary School of the Central Bucks School District is located in Jamison. Middle Bucks Institute of Technology is also located in Jamison.
