= Hempsted Court =

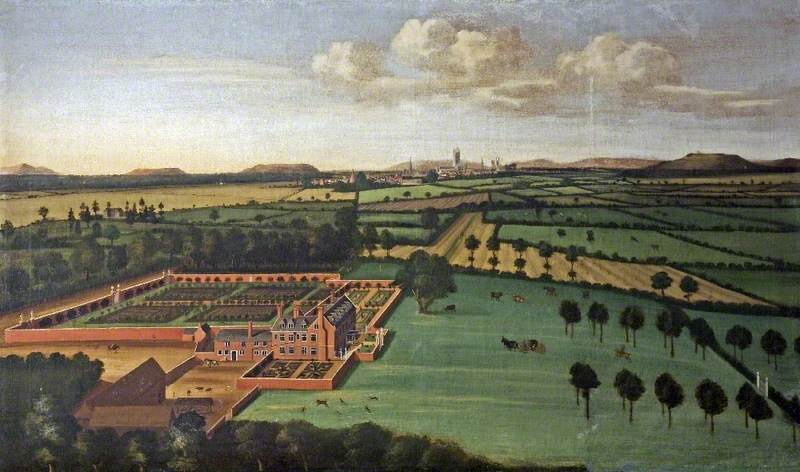
- Gloucester from Hempsted, attributed to Thomas Robins the Elder (died 1770)

- Location in Gloucestershire
- 51°51′0″N 02°15′54″W
- Location: Hempsted, Gloucestershire, England

Hempsted Court was a country house at Hempsted near Gloucester in England. It was the home of the Lysons family. It was demolished in 1962 and replaced by a housing estate.

== See also ==
- Bristol Road
