= Warwick Township, Bucks County, Pennsylvania =

Township in Pennsylvania, US

Warwick Township, Pennsylvania
- Township
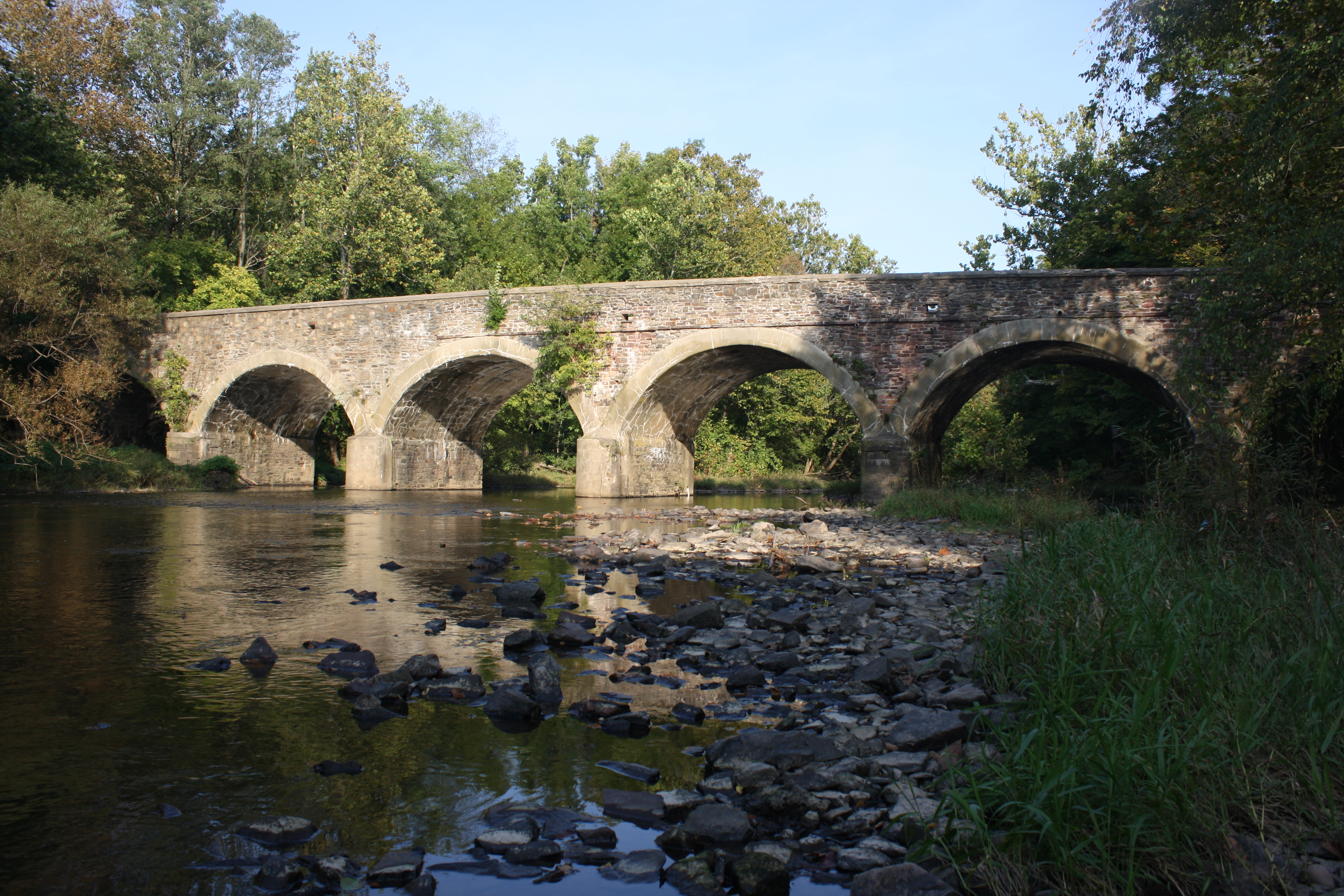
- Bridge Valley Bridge

- Seal
- Motto: "The Heart of Bucks County"
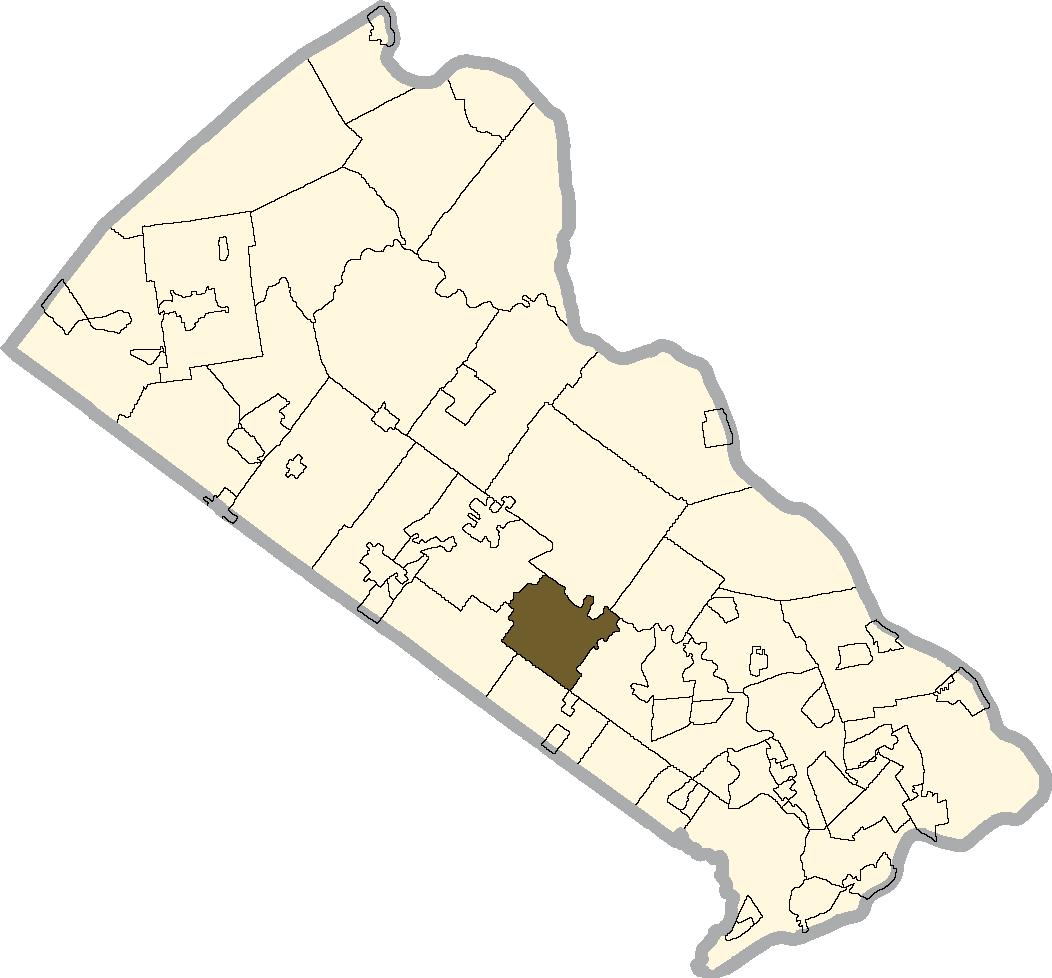
- Location of Warwick Township in Bucks County

- Location in Pennsylvania Warwick Township, Pennsylvania (the United States)
- Coordinates: 40°14′36″N 75°04′47″W
- Country: United States
- State: Pennsylvania
- County: Bucks

Area
  - Total: 11.12 sq mi (28.8 km^{2})
  - Land: 10.97 sq mi (28.4 km^{2})
  - Water: 0.14 sq mi (0.36 km^{2})
- Elevation: 338 ft (103 m)

Population (2010)
  - Total: 14,437
  - Estimate (2016): 14,632
  - Density: 1,316/sq mi (508.1/km^{2})
- Time zone: UTC-5 (EST)
  - Summer (DST): UTC-4 (EDT)
- Area codes: 215, 267 and 445
- FIPS code: 42-017-81144
- Website: warwick-bucks.com

Warwick Township is a township in Bucks County, Pennsylvania, United States. The population was 14,437 at the 2010 census.

== History ==
Warwick was formed by petition February 13, 1733 by eighteen residents. It was named after a town in central England and was the home to many Scots-Irish Presbyterians. In 1819, the Township lost over half its territory to the north when Doylestown Township was established.

History is closely tied to several existing structures. The Neshaminy Presbyterian Church is one of the earliest religious associations in Pennsylvania, dating back to 1726. The Moland House was General George Washington's headquarters when 11,000 Continental Army troops camped in Warwick Township from August 10 to August 23, 1777, while on their way to the Battle of Brandywine. The encampment stretched along both sides of Old York Road, on the slope of Carr's Hill to the north, on both sides of Bristol Road, from Mearns Road to Meetinghouse Road. General Washington held a "Council of War" with his four major generals and six brigadier generals in the Moland House.

While in Warwick Township, the American flag that was designed by Betsy Ross was presented to General Washington, and Warwick Township was the site where the American flag was first flown.

It was here the Marquis de La Fayette and Count Casimir Pulaski joined the American Revolution and distinguished themselves at the Battle of Brandywine and for many years thereafter in the fight for American freedom from England.

The Bridge Valley Bridge and Moland House are listed on the National Register of Historic Places.

== Geography ==
The township is located 20 miles north of Philadelphia and 10 miles west of Trenton, New Jersey. According to the United States Census Bureau, the township has a total area of 11.1 square miles (28.9 km^{2}), all land. It is drained by the Delaware River via the Neshaminy Creek, which forms part of Warwick's northern border. Its villages include Breadysville (also in Warminster Township), Bridge Valley, Grenoble, Hartsville (also in Warminster Township), Jamison, Sugar Bottom, and Traymore.

Other natural features include Dark Hollow and Little Neshaminy Creek.

=== Neighboring municipalities ===
- Warminster Township (southwest)
- Warrington Township (west)
- Doylestown Township (northwest)
- Buckingham Township (north)
- Wrightstown Township (northeast)
- Northampton Township (southeast)
- Ivyland (tangent to the south)

== Demographics ==
Historical population
Census	Pop.	Note	%±
1930	550		—
1940	639		16.2%
1950	906		41.8%
1960	1,810		99.8%
1970	2,138		18.1%
1980	2,307		7.9%
1990	5,916		156.4%
2000	11,977		102.5%
2010	14,437		20.5%
2020	14,851		2.9%

As of the 2010 census, the township was 93.4% White, 1.3% Black or African American, 0.2% Native American, 3.7% Asian, and 1.0% were two or more races. 2.1% of the population were of Hispanic or Latino ancestry.

As of the census of 2000, there were 11,977 people, 3,933 households, and 3,268 families residing in the township. The population density was 1,075.3 inhabitants per square mile (415.2/km^{2}). There were 4,050 housing units at an average density of 363.6 per square mile (140.4/km^{2}). The racial makeup of the township was 95.93% White, 1.04% African American, 0.07% Native American, 2.14% Asian, 0.05% Pacific Islander, 0.13% from other races, and 0.64% from two or more races. Hispanic or Latino of any race were 1.03% of the population.

There were 3,933 households, out of which 50.4% had children under the age of 18 living with them, 74.3% were married couples living together, 6.5% had a female householder with no husband present, and 16.9% were non-families. 13.1% of all households were made up of individuals, and 3.4% had someone living alone who was 65 years of age or older. The average household size was 3.04 and the average family size was 3.38.

In the township the population was spread out, with 33.1% under the age of 18, 4.9% from 18 to 24, 36.2% from 25 to 44, 20.1% from 45 to 64, and 5.8% who were 65 years of age or older. The median age was 34 years. For every 100 females there were 96.6 males. For every 100 females age 18 and over, there were 93.0 males.

The median income for a household in the township was $81,711, and the median income for a family was $88,145. Males had a median income of $60,334 versus $36,751 for females. The per capita income for the township was $29,734. About 1.2% of families and 2.3% of the population were below the poverty line, including 1.7% of those under age 18 and 5.9% of those age 65 or over.

== Climate ==
According to the Köppen climate classification system, Warwick Township, Pennsylvania has a hot-summer, wet all year, humid continental climate (Dfa). Dfa climates are characterized by at least one month having an average mean temperature ≤ 32.0 °F (≤ 0.0 °C), at least four months with an average mean temperature ≥ 50.0 °F (≥ 10.0 °C), at least one month with an average mean temperature ≥ 71.6 °F (≥ 22.0 °C), and no significant precipitation difference between seasons. During the summer months, episodes of extreme heat and humidity can occur with heat index values ≥ 100 °F (≥ 38 °C). On average, the wettest month of the year is July which corresponds with the annual peak in thunderstorm activity. During the winter months, episodes of extreme cold and wind can occur with wind chill values < 0 °F (< -18 °C). The plant hardiness zone is 7a with an average annual extreme minimum air temperature of 0.1 °F (-17.7 °C). The average seasonal (Nov-Apr) snowfall total is between 24 and 30 inches (61 and 76 cm), and the average snowiest month is February which corresponds with the annual peak in nor'easter activity.

Climate data for Warwick Township, Bucks County, Pennsylvania (1981 – 2010 averages)
Month	Jan	Feb	Mar	Apr	May	Jun	Jul	Aug	Sep	Oct	Nov	Dec	Year
Mean daily maximum °F (°C)	39.3 (4.1)	42.5 (5.8)	50.8 (10.4)	62.6 (17.0)	72.4 (22.4)	81.4 (27.4)	85.6 (29.8)	83.9 (28.8)	77.0 (25.0)	65.8 (18.8)	54.8 (12.7)	43.5 (6.4)	63.4 (17.4)
Daily mean °F (°C)	30.9 (−0.6)	33.7 (0.9)	41.2 (5.1)	51.8 (11.0)	61.4 (16.3)	70.8 (21.6)	75.3 (24.1)	73.8 (23.2)	66.5 (19.2)	54.8 (12.7)	45.2 (7.3)	35.3 (1.8)	53.5 (11.9)
Mean daily minimum °F (°C)	22.5 (−5.3)	24.8 (−4.0)	31.5 (−0.3)	41.1 (5.1)	50.5 (10.3)	60.2 (15.7)	65.0 (18.3)	63.7 (17.6)	56.0 (13.3)	43.9 (6.6)	35.6 (2.0)	27.1 (−2.7)	43.6 (6.4)
Average precipitation inches (mm)	3.35 (85)	2.67 (68)	3.87 (98)	3.96 (101)	4.32 (110)	4.26 (108)	5.10 (130)	4.20 (107)	4.40 (112)	3.93 (100)	3.67 (93)	3.95 (100)	47.68 (1,211)
Average relative humidity (%)	66.4	62.9	58.6	58.3	62.3	67.0	67.3	69.7	71.0	70.0	68.4	68.9	65.9
Average dew point °F (°C)	21.0 (−6.1)	22.4 (−5.3)	27.8 (−2.3)	37.6 (3.1)	48.4 (9.1)	59.3 (15.2)	63.7 (17.6)	63.3 (17.4)	56.8 (13.8)	45.2 (7.3)	35.4 (1.9)	26.1 (−3.3)	42.3 (5.7)
Source: PRISM Climate Group

== Transportation ==
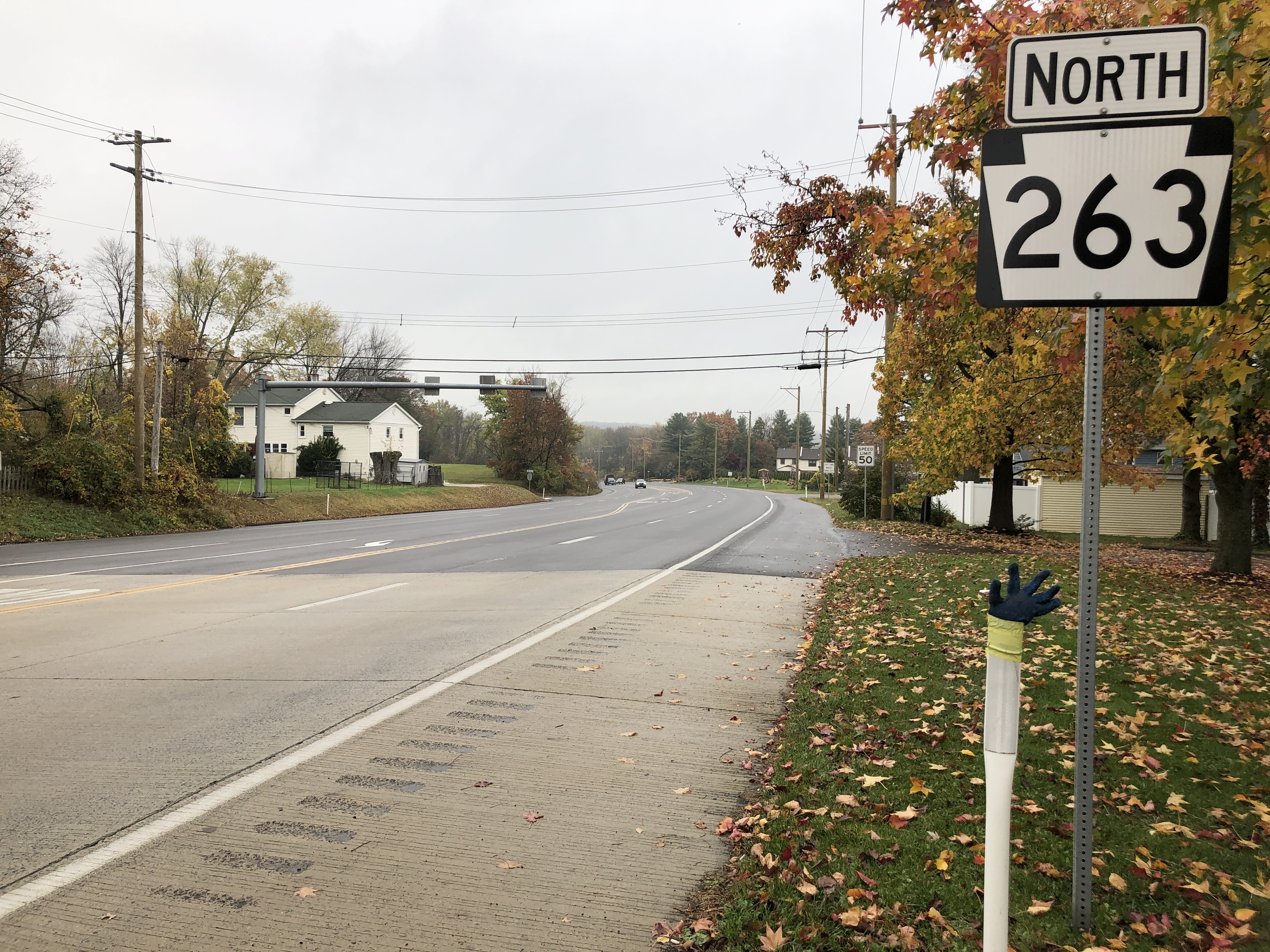
PA 263 northbound in Warwick Township

As of 2022 there were 73.44 miles (118.19 km) of public roads in Warwick Township, of which 13.87 miles (22.32 km) were maintained by the Pennsylvania Department of Transportation (PennDOT) and 59.57 miles (95.87 km) were maintained by the township.

Pennsylvania Route 263 (York Road) is the main north–south road in Warwick Township. Almshouse Road runs northwest–southeast through the center of the township and crosses PA 263 in Jamison. Bristol Road runs northwest–southeast along the southern border of the township and crosses PA 263 in Hartsville. The New Hope Railroad passes briefly through the eastern portion of the township. There is no public transportation within the borders of Warwick Township, with the Warminster station along SEPTA Regional Rail's Warminster Line located in neighboring Warminster Township.

== Ecology ==
According to the A. W. Kuchler U.S. potential natural vegetation types, Warwick Township, Pennsylvania would have an Appalachian Oak (104) vegetation type with an Eastern Hardwood Forest (25) vegetation form.
