= RAF Quedgeley =

Former RAF station in Gloucestershire, England

RAF Quedgeley
- Near Quedgeley, Gloucestershire in England
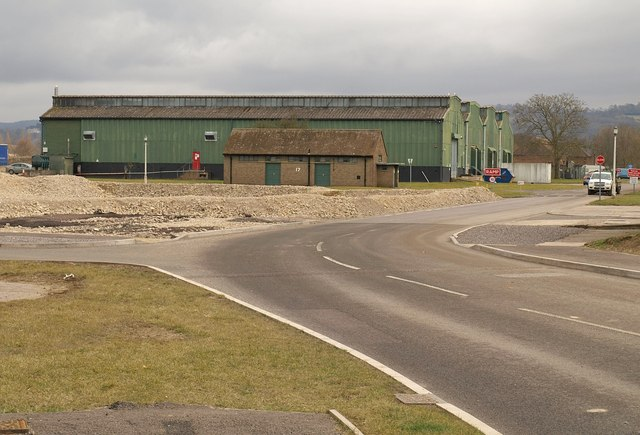

Site information
- Type: Non-flying Royal Air Force station
- Owner: Ministry of Defence
- Controlled by: Royal Air Force

Location
- Shown within Gloucestershire
- Location within Gloucestershire Location within the United Kingdom
- Coordinates: 51.8204°N 2.2675°W

Site history
- Built: 1914
- In use: 1914-1926; 1939-1995

Garrison information
- Garrison: RAF Maintenance Command

Royal Air Force Quedgeley or more simply RAF Quedgeley is a former Royal Air Force station near Quedgeley, Gloucestershire, England which opened in 1914.

== History ==
The site was first occupied in 1914. It closed as an independent RAF unit on 13 February 1995.

As of 1915 part of the site was the No 5 National Filling Factory which supplied ammunition during the First World War. At one point 6364 people, mainly women, were employed at the site. The factory produced over 10.5 million 14" and 16" shells, 7 million cartridges and 23 million fuses and other components. The site also included a horse convalescence unit.

The buildings were demolished between 1924 and 1926.

In the Second World War, No. 7 Maintenance Unit, RAF Quedgeley was opened on 15 April 1939 as a storage and maintenance site for aircraft equipment and motor vehicles. It continued in this logistics role until its closure in 1995, with the storage of large quantities of basic equipment such as furniture.

== Current use ==
The site has subsequently been sold and is being developed for housing (Kingsway Village) and industrial uses.

== See also ==
- List of former Royal Air Force stations
