= St Paul and St Stephen Church, Gloucester =

St Paul and St Stephen Church
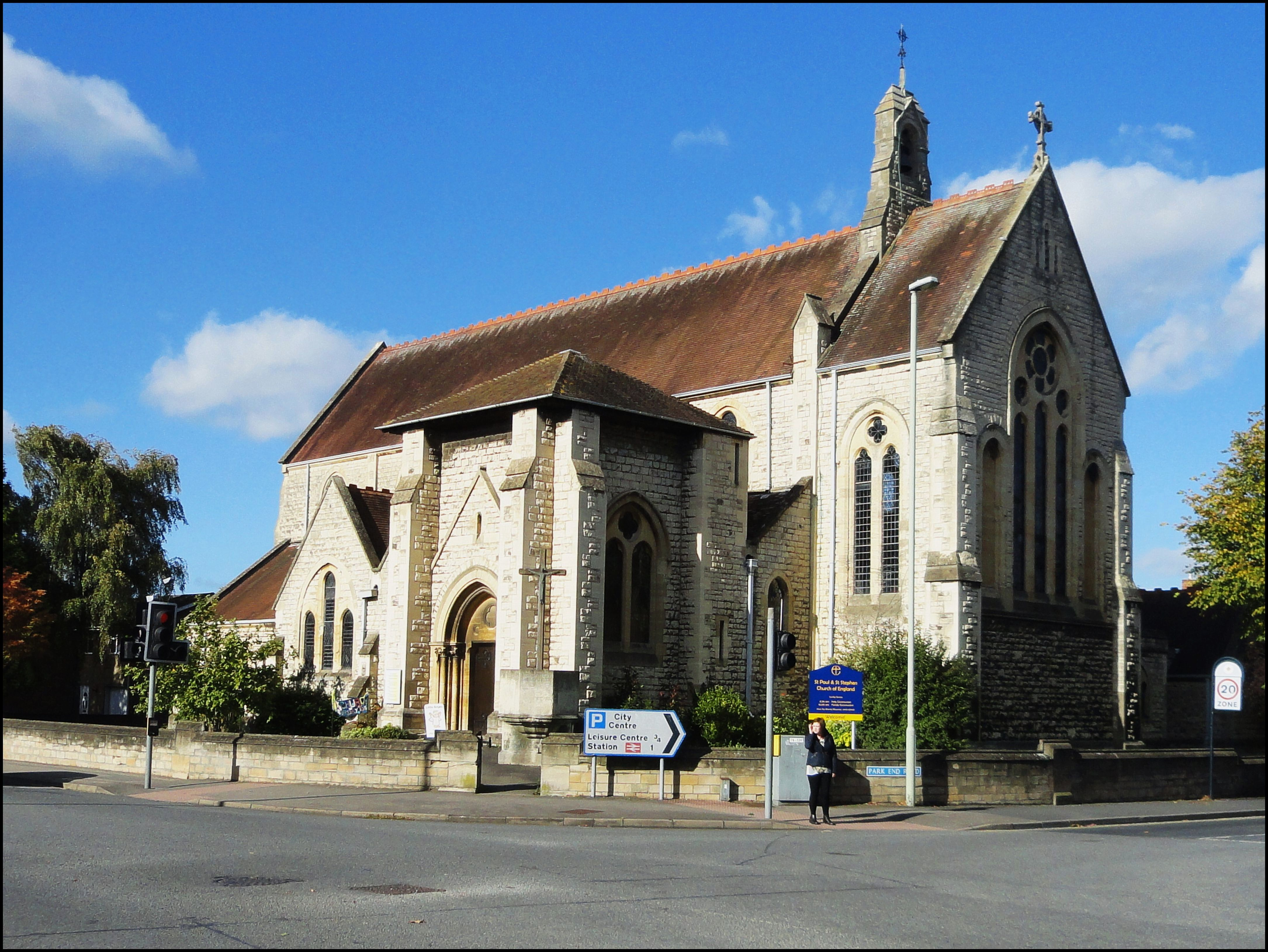
- St Paul and St Stephen Church
- 51.8546503°N 2.2450565°W
- Location: Gloucester, Gloucestershire
- Country: England
- Denomination: Church of England

History
- Status: Parish church
- Dedication: St Paul and St Stephen

Architecture
- Functional status: Active
- Architect: Alfred King with Capel Tripp
- Architectural type: English Gothic
- Years built: 1882

Specifications
- Materials: ~

Administration
- Diocese: Gloucester
- Parish: St Paul and St Stephen

St Paul and St Stephen Church is a Church of England church located in Stroud Road, Gloucester, Gloucestershire. St Paul church was built between 1882 and 1883. St Stephen church was built between 1898 and 1900. St Stephen church was closed in 2010 and the church was merged with St Paul's which became St Paul and St Stephen church. Closely associated with the church is St Paul's Church of England Primary school located in New Street, Gloucester which opened in 1870.

== History ==
=== St Paul ===
The building was constructed in 1882 by Alfred King with Capel Tripp being the architect. The church was consecrated for use on 11 October 1883 by the Bishop of Gloucester. It was built to serve the expanding population but also as a memorial to Robert Raikes on the 100th anniversary of the 1780 Sunday school movement. It was funded by a grant from the Incorporated Church Building Society and donations including a large gift from D.H.D Burr. In total around £6,500 was raised, although this was enough to complete the church two parts of the original design were not fully built including the nave which was stopped two bays short and the tower which was partially built and roofed over to provide a porch. However, even though the original design was not completed the church was still a large building with room for around 600 people in the nave mostly seated on benches. Originally the building was called the Raikes Memorial Church but it was renamed to St Paul's after an unsuccessful appeal to Sunday schools to contribute funds for the construction of the building. The font was also present around 1883 and was given by the archdeacon Edward Scobell of Gloucester.

In 1884, the parish of St Paul's was formed and the church was officially endowed. A house built opposite the church on the Stroud Road in 1884 became the vicarage. The organ was donated at this time by the first vicar Reverend. W.H.S Davies, it is positioned at the south-east end of the building. In 1885, the north part of Tuffley was added to the parish. In 1888, a parish room was built in Tredworth Road, next to Tredworth School, this is now the New Apostolic Church.

Between 1912 and 1915, the east end of the church was refurbished with a new altar and oak wood paneling. In 1914, the space to the north of the altar was fitted out as a lady chapel and in 1919, a World War One memorial was constructed outside the main entrance of the church, It was dedicated before a crowd of 3,000 people. in 1920, an altar for the chapel was added. A second north vestry was built in 1931. Between 1938 and 1939, the west end of the church was completed and the east side restored to designs by W. E. Ellery Anderson this was paid for by a bequest of Sarah Critchley, and completed the original design envisaged by Capel Tripp. Specifically, the nave and aisles were extended westwards, a porch was added to the west, and a stone gallery was built in the nave. Also at this time, the east stained glass window was installed. In 1952, a new vicarage was purchased along Kings Edwards Avenue which replaced the original vicarage opposite the church.

Another refurbishment in the 1980s, saw the west end of the nave converted into a hall, kitchen, meeting room and toilets. The main altar was replaced with a new contemporary altar.

The First World War memorial was listed as a Grade II listed building in 2014.

=== St Stephen ===
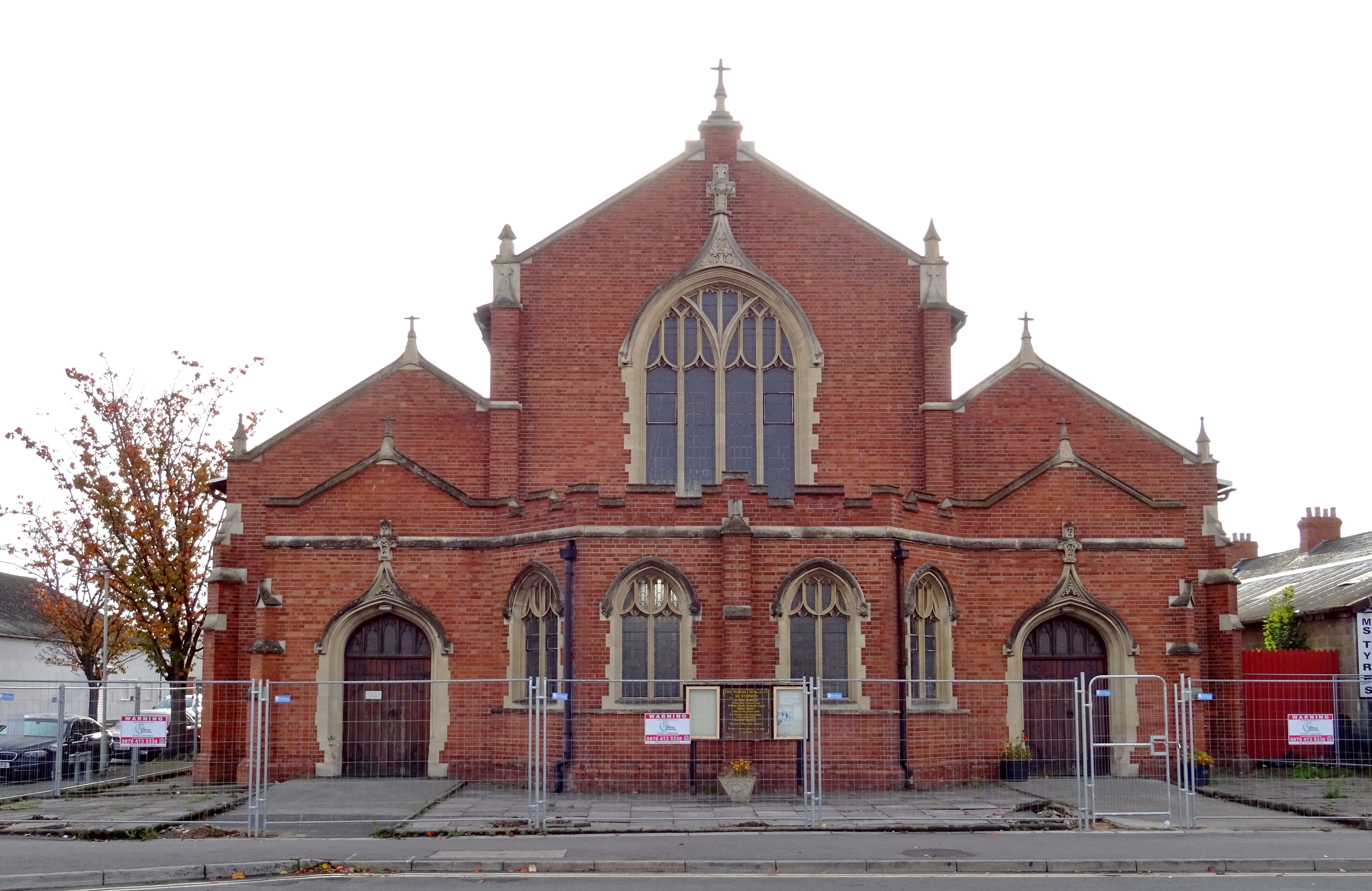
St Stephen Church, Gloucester in October 2018

In 1895, there was an appeal for a new church to be built in the parish of St Luke. The existing Church of St. Luke in High Orchard, was to be kept as a mission church. In 1896, difficulties in raising the £6,000 needed to build the church were encountered due to a smallpox epidemic and the outbreak of the Boer War. As a result of this the church had to be built in sections. The Reverend H. Proctor of St Luke's purchased land at the south end of the parish on the corner of Bristol Road and Linden Road for the new building. On 24 October 1898, the first foundation stone was placed by Lady Darell. By 1900, the first section had been built which included the lady chapel, chancel, vestries and three bays of the nave. This was consecrated for use on 18 October 1900 by Bishop Elliot. At this time, the church was called St Luke the Less. In 1909, the parish of St Luke was divided with St Luke the Less becoming its own parish. The vicarage house for St Luke's was given to the new parish. In 1926, the Reverend E. C. Pritchard was appointed and started fundraising to complete the church building. By 1928, another £6,000 had been raised including a grant of £3,600 from the Bishop's appeal fund. The work was carried out between 1928 and 1930 to a design made by H. A. Dancey. The aisles and nave were extended westwards by two bays, and the west front of the building was added and included a bell-cot, two porches and a baptistery. Upon completion of this work the Duchess of Beaufort unveiled a stone recording the completion of the building and the church was rededicated to St Stephen, however the parish remained as St Luke the Less. In 1935, the original church of St Luke was demolished. In 2010, St Stephen church was merged with St Paul church where all services are now held.

There is a memorial on the rear wall of the church to workers of the Morelands Match Factory who died during World War One. This was originally attached to the wall of the factory itself however it was closed in 1975.

== Architecture ==
=== St Paul ===
The church is built in the early English Gothic style with lancet windows and pointed arches in the nave. It is built in limestone and consists of a sanctuary at the east end, two north vestries, an undivided aisled and clerestoried chancel and nave with east bell-cot, the first stage of a south tower, a west porch, and short outer aisles. There is a pointed high arch at the east end of the church. The font is a round stone bowl on eight marble shafts.

The First World War memorial in the churchyard consists of an octagonal stone pulpit set on a plinth. It is open to the rear and corbelled to the front. There is a timber crucifix on top, with a bronze figure of Jesus.

=== St Stephen ===
The church is built of brick and stone dressings in the late Gothic style. It originally consisted of a chancel with north vestry rooms, an organ chamber, a south chapel and an aisled and clerestoried nave. Later, a bell-cot, two porches and a polygonal baptistery were added.
