= The Little Thatch =

Building in Gloucester, England

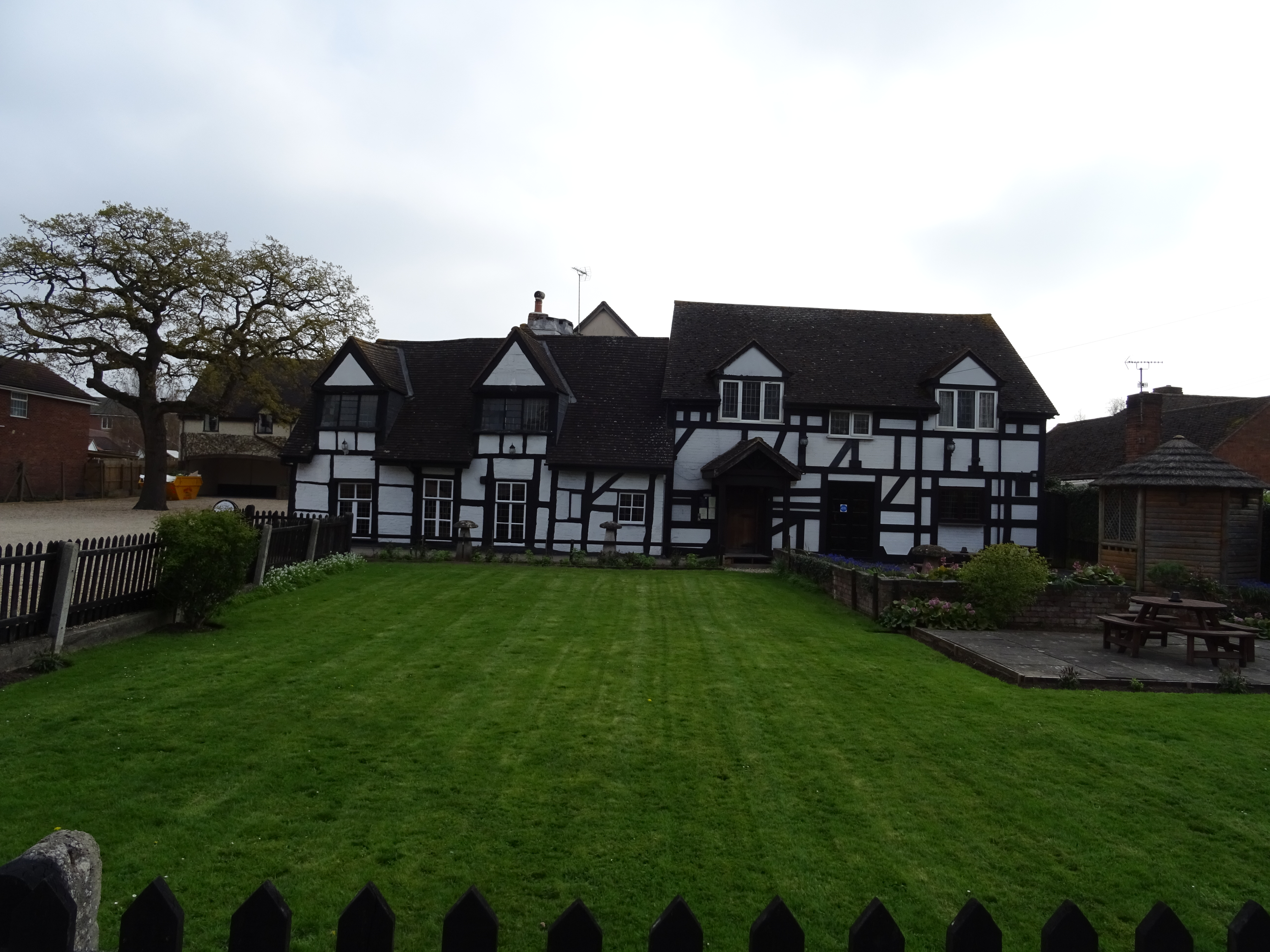
- Location: Quedgeley
- Coordinates: 51.8285615°N 2.275942°W
- Area: Quedgeley, Gloucester
- Built: 1351
- Architectural style(s): 14th century timber-frame
- Owner: The Hatton Collection

The Little Thatch (also known as The Thatch Inn) is a 14th-century timber-framed building at 141 Bristol Road, Quedgeley, Gloucester. It is now used as a public house and hotel.

== History ==
The buildings were built in 1351, both having thatched roofs, and were known as Queen Anne's Farm, Goulding's Farm (1884 map) and Read's Farm. In 1535, it is rumoured Anne Boleyn stayed here when Henry VIII and herself passed through Quedgeley. It was extended in the 19th and 20th century, then since 1967 it has been used as a public house and hotel.

From 1970, the Inn was operated by Jacky McDougall. The building was Grade II listed on 30 September 1985. In 2015, The Hotel Inspector filmed in the Little Thatch to help the former owner. In 2018, the Inn was sold to the Hatton Collection for £800,000.

== Architecture ==
Originally built as two separate single storey semi-detached houses, it consisted of a timber-frame in-filled with brick, a brick chimney and a thatched roof. Later, expansion work added a second storey and the thatched roof was replaced with plain tiles. The building faces west towards the road and at the front on the left-hand side there are two original large timber-framed gabled roof dormers with casement windows, on the right there are two more however these are brick additions with applied timber-framing. On the north side, there is a half-hipped timber-framed gable end that leans inwards, and a raking dormer with two more small casement windows located towards the back of the building. Also on the north side is a ridge mounted brick chimney which would have originally been three diagonal brick shafts. On the east side, there is timber-framed gable above a flat roofed addition.
