= Quedgeley =

Town in Gloucestershire, England

Coordinates: 51.825°N 2.280°W

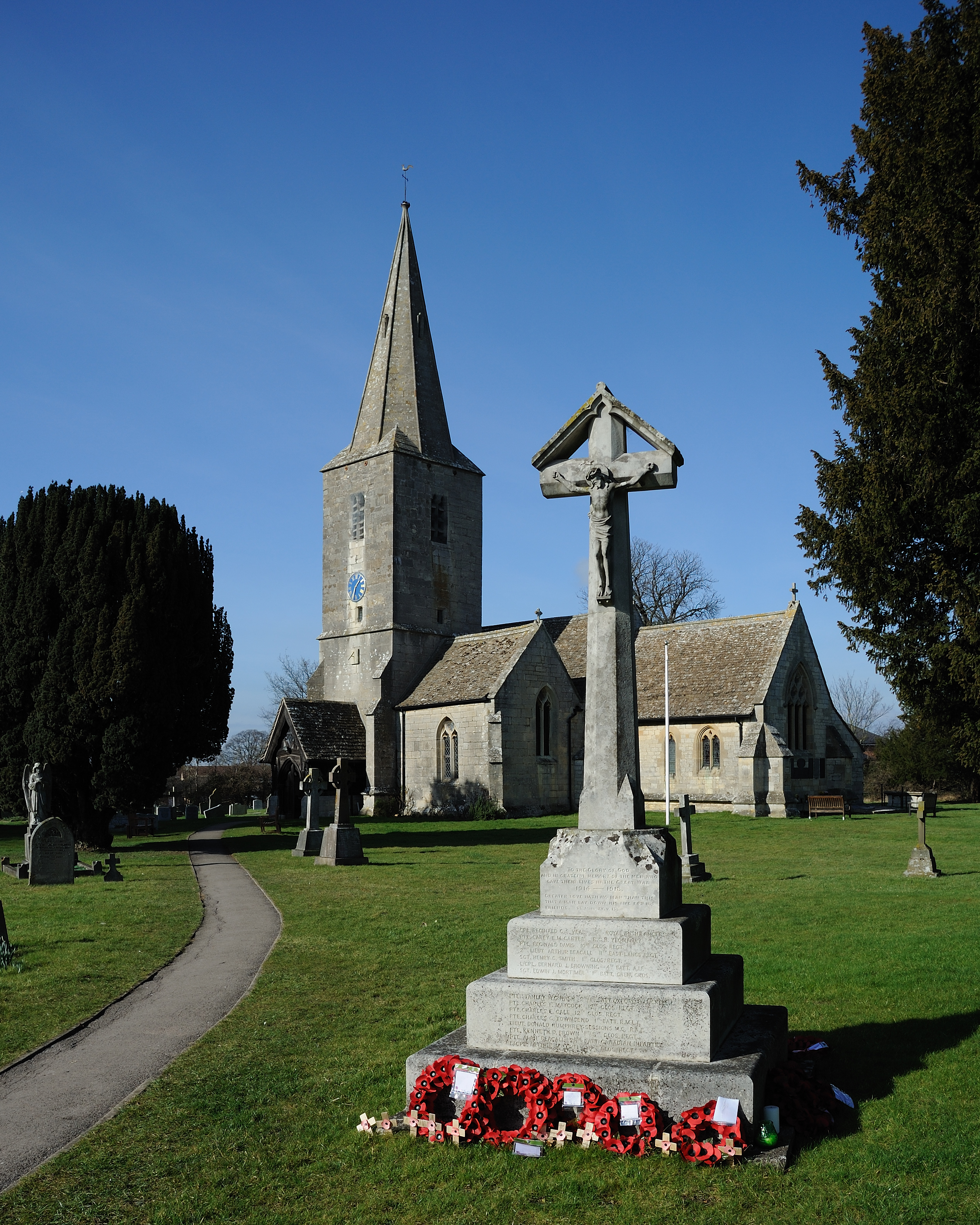
- St James and its World War I War Memorial

- Location within Gloucestershire
- Population: 17,519
- OS grid reference: SO7960114021
- Civil parish: Quedgeley
- District: Gloucester
- Shire county: Gloucestershire
- Region: South West
- Country: England
- Sovereign state: United Kingdom
- Post town: GLOUCESTER
- Postcode district: GL2
- Dialling code: 01452
- Police: Gloucestershire
- Fire: Gloucestershire
- Ambulance: South Western
- UK Parliament: Gloucester

Quedgeley is a town and civil parish in the city of Gloucester district in Gloucestershire, England. A thin strip of land between the Severn and the Gloucester Ship Canal occupies the west, and the south-eastern part of the town is Kingsway Village, directly to the north of which is Tuffley.

The civil parish of Quedgeley was transferred to Gloucester district in 1991 and is the only town within the city. The 2011 census recorded a population of 17,519 for the parish, which has an area of 576 hectares (1,420 acres). Since the 1980s Quedgeley has become increasingly contiguous with Gloucester and Hardwicke which is in the Stroud District.

== History ==
The name Quedgeley possibly derives from the Old English cweodlēah meaning 'Cweod's wood or clearing', or perhaps from cwēadlēah meaning 'dirty wood or clearing'.

The parish of Quedgeley was established by 1095 when St James Church was built. it is believed that the parish was formed by the amalgamation of several other parishes. Quedgeley originated as a roadside settlement, with houses being built along the Roman road between Gloucester and Bristol (now the Bristol Road, B4008). The eastern side of Quedgeley is marked by the Daniels Brook, which separates it from Tuffley. The western/southern boundary is marked by the River Severn and Dimore Brook, which separates it from Elmore and Hardwicke.

In 1263, John Giffard of Brimpsfield was summoned to a meeting of the hundred court at Quedgeley by the Sheriff of Gloucester Castle who wanted to capture him. However, John bought an army of followers who attacked the Sheriff and his men, driving them away from the parish. In 1327, there were fourteen people living in Quedgeley. In 1535, Henry VIII and Anne Boleyn visited the parish and were met by representatives of the city of Gloucester. Around this time in the Middle Ages, the main road through the parish was known as "The King's Way", this passed over the Daniels Brook via a wooden bridge known as the "Wain Bridge".

In 1551, there were 69 people living in the parish and in 1603, there were 123. Many of the early houses were built along the Bristol Road (B4008); these date back to the 16th century and earlier. An example of one of these early buildings is the Little Thatch pub, which is a two-story house with a timber frame and thatched roof built upon an L-shaped plot.

An area described as the "Quedgeley Green" or the "Great Green" around 1675 was a collection of fields on both sides of the Bristol Road (B4008) which became private land in 1841 and has since been developed and built upon, so now just a small playing field remains.

The Bristol Road was a toll road between 1726 and 1877. In 1775, the Woolstrop hamlet was officially merged into Quedgeley when the land tax was adjusted to be in line with Quedgeley's. In 1793, work began on the Gloucester and Sharpness Canal which passed through the parish, this was opened to traffic in 1827. Swing bridges were built to cross the canal along Sims Lane and Elmore Lane. In 1801, there were 203 people living in the parish this rose to 297 in 1831 and was 401 by 1851. Accompanying this rise in population was an increase in the number of houses, many of which were built of brick, along the Bristol Road in pairs or as detached houses. In the 19th and early 20th centuries, many small brick houses were built along Sims Lane, Elmore Lane and Naas Lane. In 1844, the Bristol and Gloucester Railway was opened heading south from Gloucester crossing through the eastern side of the parish. In 1882 and 1885, small changes were made to the boundary lines of Quedgeley, in particular, the area of Netheridge, just south of the River Severn was transferred to Hempsted. In 1900, Lower Tuffley was added to Quedgeley and the population of the parish became 639, this rose to 912 by 1931.

RAF Quedgeley was established in 1914 on land to the east of the parish. In 1939, the site was opened as a maintenance unit and houses were built for its staff along the east end of the Bristol Road and the north end of Naas Lane.

From the 1920s, Quedgeley had a regular bus service which travelled from Bristol to Gloucester. In 1935 Quedgeley gained the area of Field Court from Hardwicke, and Lower Tuffley was transferred to Gloucester. Also by this time, mains water, gas and electricity were available. However, the sewage system wasn't built until after 1967.

In the 1930s, the village hall was opened on the Bristol Road at the east end of School Lane. In 1951, the area to the north-east of Daniel's Brook was given to Gloucester and in 1954, Quedgeley gained a small amount of land from Hempsted giving it the 576 hectares (1,420 acres) that it has today. By 1961, there were 1,121 people in the parish. The village hall was destroyed in 1959 and a new hall was built in 1962.

The "Wain Bridge" became unused in 1958 when Cole Avenue was built. In the 1950s and 1960s, many commercial and industrial buildings went up along the Bristol Road. Also around this time a large amount of land was developed, including many semi-detached houses being built along Sims Lane and in 1962 bungalows were built by St James's Church. RAF Quedgeley closed in 1995, and this area has now been redeveloped into Kingsway Village.

On 24 April 2017, Quedgeley Parish Council decisively voted to change the classification of the parish into a town, due to having a large population compared to other towns in the county.

== Religion ==
The parish church is St James and is known to have been established before 1137. The octagonal font has panels of gold, coloured tesserae, and blue forest stone. The baptismal font is 12th century but was a donation by the then Rev. Winstone Hayward for the re-opening of the church in 1857. While the present-day structure's tower and south aisle are medieval in origin, the remainder of the church is an 1856 restoration by Henry Woodyer in what is considered Victorian Gothic style.

== Amenities and transport ==
Stagecoach West serve the Quedgeley area on Route 12 connecting Quedgeley to Gloucester City Centre. Additionally Route 8 serves the Kingsway area, continuing to Hunts Grove and the 64/65 pass through the town continuing towards Stroud.

There are three public houses in the town, The Little Thatch, The Haywain (previously called The Weavers Arms and originally The Basket Maker) and Friar Tucks. There are several take-aways and restaurants which include a Miller and Carter steakhouse. The town has a community centre and a town hall.

The A38 road runs through Quedgeley, now as a dual carriageway running between Gloucester city centre and the M5 motorway at junction 12; the old route taken by the A38 through Quedgeley is now the B4008.
