= England's Glory =

Brand of matches

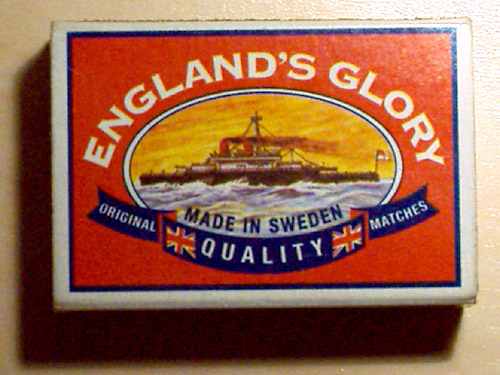
A box of England's Glory matches

England's Glory is a brand of non-safety matches, available in the United Kingdom, using a celebrated image of a Victorian battleship, HMS Devastation.

== History ==
The product was originally made in the still-standing 'Moreland's Match Manufactory' in Bristol Road, Gloucester by S. J. Moreland and Sons, who became a subsidiary of Bryant & May in 1913, although full ownership by Bryant and May only came in 1938.

Consolidation of match production within Great Britain led to Bryant and May's matches being made at Garston in Liverpool, London and Glasgow. England's Glory then became a brand for matches made at Bryant and May's Garston factory which were sold mainly in the North of England and the Midlands. The matches made in Glasgow were marketed in Scotland as Scottish Bluebell matches.

The firm of Bryant & May ceased to exist in the 1980s, but England's Glory and Scottish Bluebell branded matches have stopped being manufactured in Sweden by the company Swedish Match. The modern England's Glory matchbox design is, however, not the previous design, which used to have jokes printed on the back, submitted by members of the public. One example was: "A visitor to London annoyed a cabbie by boastful comparisons of English and American buildings. When they reached the Thames, the American said, 'Driver, what's that trickle?' Cabbie, 'Heavens! My radiator has burst!' "

== Popular culture ==
The public house England's Glory in London Road, Gloucester, is named after the matches.

The song "Senses Working Overtime" by XTC contains the spoken phrases "England's Glory" and "A striking beauty", the latter being a slogan associated with "England's Glory" matches.

The Macc Lads wrote a song called "England's Glory" referring to the matches.

The Welsh band Stereophonics took the lyric "It only takes one tree to make a thousand matches but only takes one match to burn a thousand trees" for their hit song "A Thousand Trees" from the back of a box of England's Glory matches.

Various re-issues of English pub-rock performer Ian Dury's 1977 album New Boots and Panties contain a live version of his composition "England's Glory".

== Namesake ==
On 7 November 1881, the ship England's Glory was wrecked off Nelson, New Zealand, by getting too close in while waiting the arrival of the pilot. (See List of shipwrecks of Oceania).
