= S. J. Moreland and Sons =

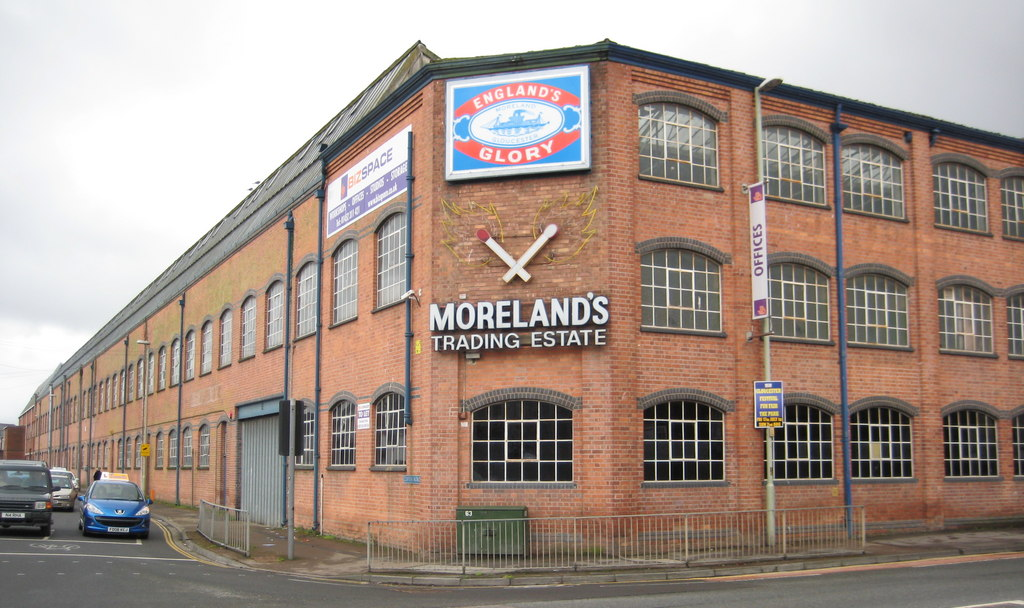
The former Moreland's match factory

S. J. Moreland and Sons was a family company, founded in 1867 and wound up in 1976. It manufactured "England's Glory" matches.

== History ==
Samuel J. Moreland, son of a sawyer from Stroud, Gloucestershire was born in 1828. In 1867, he moved to Gloucester, and opened the Moreland Trade Factory (which still stands today, on Bristol Road) to manufacture those matches.

In 2010, there was a campaign to relight the celebrated "England's Glory" sign (unlit since the 1970s) on the factory, some residents even offering to pay.

The electoral ward of Moreland, Gloucester is named after the factory.
