= Bromford (housing association) =

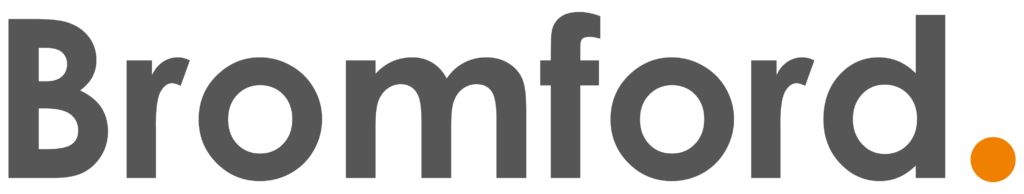
- Type: Housing association
- Industry: Social housing
- Founded: 1963
- Headquarters: Tewkesbury, England
- Area served: West Midlands, East Midlands
- Parent: Bromford Flagship (from 28 February 2025)
- Website: www.bromford.co.uk

Bromford is a housing association operating as part of Bromford Flagship LiveWest, one of the United Kingdom's largest housing providers. Following a merger between Bromford and Flagship Group on 28 February 2025, Bromford continues to operate with its own brand and website as a constituent part of the combined organisation, which manages over 70,000 homes across the Midlands and East of England.

Based in Tewkesbury, Bromford provides affordable housing and support services to around 45,000 residents across the Midlands. The organisation focuses on neighbourhood investment, community development, and supporting residents to live independently.

== History ==
=== Foundation and early years ===
Bromford Housing Association was founded in 1963 by a group of Quakers with the aim of creating housing associations for working people in Birmingham. The first homes were built in Erdington, Birmingham.

=== Growth and expansion ===
In 1988, Bromford took over Perry Common Housing Association with 200 homes. The organisation registered as Bromford Housing Group in 1991.

In January 2001, Bromford Housing Group, Focus Housing Group and Mercian Housing Association announced their intention to merge. The merger was completed in 2002, creating a single organisation with more than 20,000 homes in the Midlands and East of England.

In 2003, Bromford moved into Gloucestershire, taking ownership of Cheltenham Housing Association and Stonham Home Ownership, thereby increasing its stock by over 1,000 homes.

In July 2006, Bromford Housing Group took control of the Redditch Co-operative Homes, adding over 5,000 homes to its portfolio in Redditch and Bromsgrove. In 2008, Merlin Housing Society became part of Bromford, bringing 3,400 properties across Shropshire, Herefordshire and Worcestershire to the organisation. In 2009, Cadbury's Staff Housing Society joined with Bromford, adding around 300 homes in Bournville.

On 25 September 2017, Bromford and Severn Vale Housing merged to create a new organisation managing over 42,000 homes. The merger brought together Bromford's operations across the Midlands with Severn Vale's presence in Gloucestershire, creating one of the region's largest housing providers.

=== Merger with Flagship Group (2025) ===
On 28 February 2025, Bromford merged with Flagship Group to create Bromford Flagship, bringing together two major housing associations to form one of the UK's largest housing providers with over 70,000 homes. The merger combined Bromford's operations across the Midlands with Flagship's presence in the East of England, creating an organisation with significant scale and reach.

Following the merger, Bromford continues to operate with its own brand identity and website as part of the Bromford Flagship family of organisations, which also includes Victory Housing Trust, Newtide Homes, and Samphire Homes. The combined organisation maintains a strong focus on building new homes, regenerating neighbourhoods, tackling social housing stigma, and supporting residents across its operating areas.

== Operations ==
=== Housing provision ===
Bromford provides affordable housing across the Midlands, managing thousands of homes for social rent, affordable rent, and shared ownership. The organisation works with local authorities, developers, and housing partners to deliver new homes and maintain existing housing stock.

As part of Bromford Flagship, Bromford continues to develop new housing schemes, invest in neighbourhood improvements, and provide housing management services across its traditional operating areas in the West Midlands and East Midlands.

=== Resident services ===
Bromford provides support services to residents, including tenancy sustainment, employment support, and community development programmes. The organisation works to help residents maintain their tenancies, access training and employment opportunities, and engage with their local communities.

== See also ==
- Housing association
- Social housing in the United Kingdom
