= Hartsville, Pennsylvania =

Unincorporated community in Pennsylvania, US

- Populated place
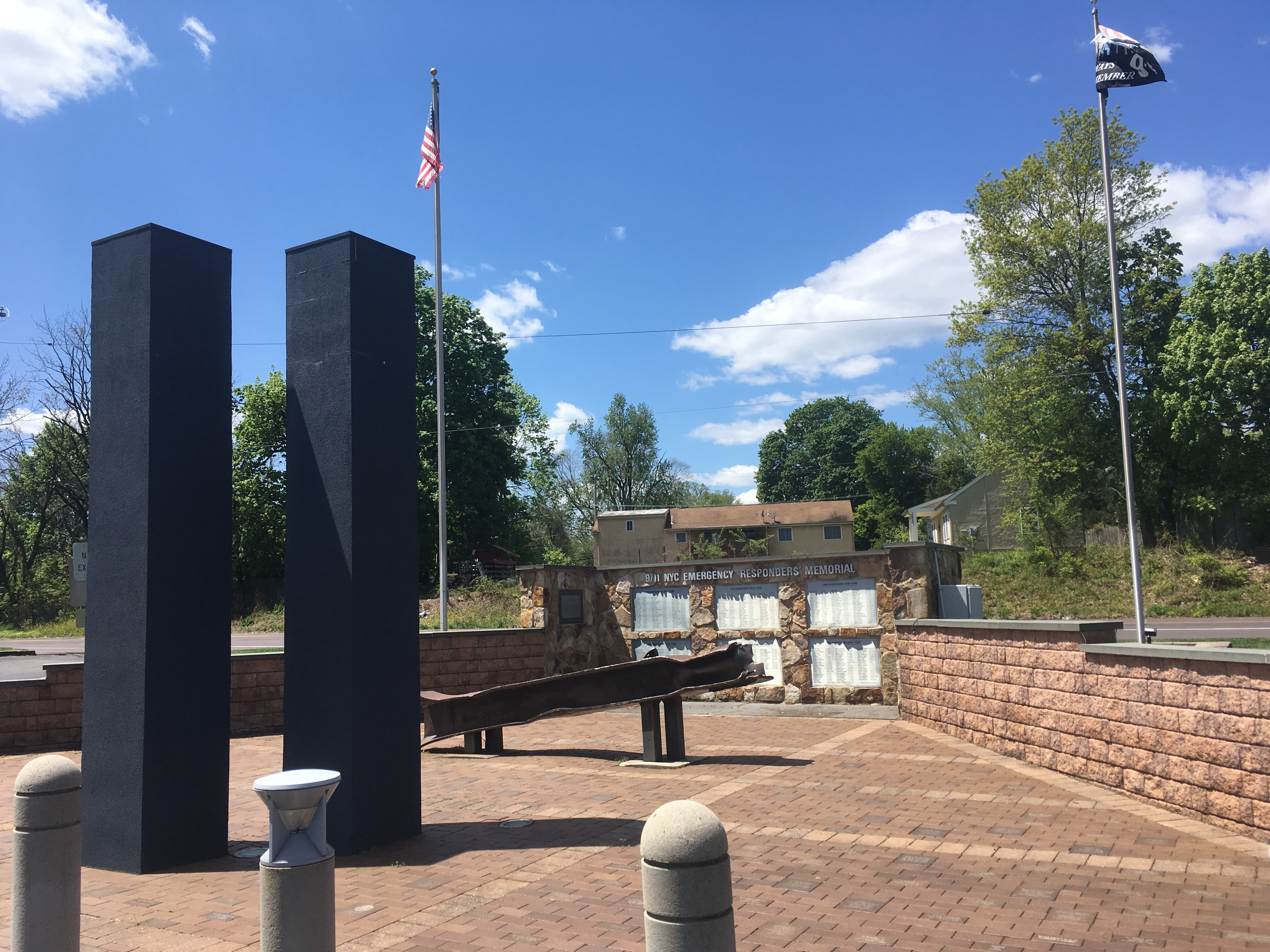
- Hartsville Fire Company 9/11 Memorial

- Location of Hartsville in Pennsylvania Hartsville (the United States)
- Coordinates: 40°13′42″N 75°05′42″W
- Country: United States
- State: Pennsylvania
- County: Bucks
- Elevation: 249 ft (76 m)
- Time zone: UTC-5 (Eastern (EST))
  - Summer (DST): UTC-4 (EDT)
- ZIP code: 18974
- Area codes: 215, 267, and 445
- FIPS code: 42-32984
- GNIS feature ID: 1192587

Hartsville is a populated place that is situated at the crossroads of Bristol Road and the Old York Road, and straddles Warminster and Warwick Township in Bucks County, Pennsylvania, United States.

It has an estimated elevation of 427 feet (130 m) above sea level, and is served by the Warminster Post Office ZIP code of 18974.

== History ==
Hartsville was named for Colonel William Hart, who served during the Revolutionary War. After relocating to the village during the late 1700s, he opened a new inn which he called "The Sign of the Hart."

Initially a station stop on the Pennsylvania Northeastern Railroad that was named Hartville, that railroad depot was later renamed Ivyland.

As a town gradually formed around the stop and inn, the town was renamed as Hartsville and more services were added to meet the needs of the growing population. A Presbyterian church opened its doors in Hartsville in 1839, and continued to serve its congregation until 1939, when it merged with another church; its Hartsville building was then torn down. The church's cemetery is perpetually maintained.

A collection in the Metropolitan Museum of Art includes an 1843 cut-paper silhouette portrait of a Hartsville resident identified as Mrs. James P. Wilson.

=== Recent history ===
The Hartsville Fire Company is the site of a 9/11 memorial.

In 2019, water from private wells in the community was reportedly unsafe to drink because of contamination by per- and polyfluoroalkyl substances (PFAS) chemicals, possibly from toxic waste from closed military facilities nearby.
