= The Forum, Gloucester =

Development in Gloucester, England

The Forum
Project
- Construction started: August 2021
- Completed: December 2022 (Phase 1) Summer 2024 (Phase 2)
- Construction cost: 107 million
- Status: In Progress
- Developer: The Reef Group
- Architect: UrbanR
- Owner: The Reef Group and Gloucestershire County Council
- Website: https://www.forumdigital.co.uk/

Physical features
- Public spaces: Kings Square
- Streets: Kings Square, Market Parade, Station Road, Bruton Way
- Transport: Gloucester Transport Hub, Gloucester railway station

Location
- Interactive map of The Forum, Gloucester
- Coordinates: 51°51′55.8″N 2°14′28.4″W
- Location: Gloucester, Gloucestershire, United Kingdom

Area
  - Land: 5.57 ha (13.77 acres)

The Forum is part of the Kings Quarter development in Gloucester, England. It is a 600,000 sq ft area. It will consist of forty three apartments, a four star hotel, the Gloucester Transport Hub, Cafes, Bars, a Gym, retail units, One and Two Cathedral View, and a car park. Phase Two of the development will be completed in the Summer of 2024.

== Architecture ==
One Cathedral View is a seven floor building designed in a L-shape. It will be split into three wings named "West wing", "Central wing" and "East wing". There will be two sets of stairs and lifts either side of the Central wing. The total floor space will be 109,000 sq ft with the West wing being the largest. The construction will be a Concrete frame and sub-structure throughout. The exterior of the building will be largely faced with glass and red aluminium facades. When complete 1342 panels weighing around 500kg each will form a feature similar to the stone cloisters and facades of Gloucester Cathedral. The building is designed with sustainability in mind with extensive urban drainage and rainwater capture. It will be net-zero and naturally ventilated with smart building technologies to limit energy use. It will also have brown roofs throughout to improve thermal mass and reduce energy loss.

Two Cathedral View is a five floor building attached to the car park and hotel. The total floor space will be 26,000 sq ft. It will have the same concrete structure and facade as One Cathedral View. It will also have a brown roof. The car park will have a living green wall with around 600 sq metres of plants. This is designed to help cool the building in hot weather and help to absorb sound.

Both buildings will have an energy performance A rating. They will be net-zero carbon in operation with electricity produced through renewable methods including rooftop solar panels.

There is a bridge connecting One and Two Cathedral View on the fourth floor and weighs 44,000 kg and measures 18.5m in length.

Whitefriars Apartments is a five floor building this is mainly residential with part of the ground floor reserved for commercial use. The design of the building is split into three attached parts, the middle part is three floors high with the side wings both being five floors high. It consists of nineteen apartments and rooftop garden on the central roof. The exterior is clad with a mixture of light grey and brown bricks. The building takes its name from the monastery which was originally on the site of the Gloucester Transport Hub.

== Construction ==
The construction of the Forum is being done in multiple stages:

The construction of the area began with Gloucester Transport Hub which opened in October 2018. Then continued with the renovation of Kings Square which was completed in April 2022.

Phase One of the new buildings was Whitefriars Apartments. The construction company E.G Carter & Co Ltd were appointed by Gloucestershire County Council in May 2021 to carry out the building work. The building was constructed between August 2021 and December 2022 by and cost around £8 million to complete.

Phase Two of the new buildings, One and Two Cathedral View, is being constructed between Spring 2022 to Summer 2024 by the construction company Kier Group and will cost approximately £86 million to complete.

The Gloucester City Campus is a redevelopment of the former Debenhams store being led by the University of Gloucestershire. Work began in May 2022 and is due to be completed in September 2024.

== Facilities ==
The forum is primarily designed to be a digital campus "cyber hub". It will include digital conference facilities and 97,707 sq ft of workspace for technology companies. The aim is to attract both small and large technology businesses into Gloucester.

There will be a 131 bedroom four star hotel which will include a restaurant and rooftop bar, it will be branded as Hotel Indigo and be run by IHG Hotels.

There will be a multi-storey car park with 398 spaces, this will be initially be run by Q-Park. Ten percent of the parking spaces will have charging points for electric cars.

43 residential apartments will be available within Whitefriars. These will be a mixture of one, two and three bedroom properties 19 of these were made available as part of phase one development in December 2022, a further 24 will due to be made available as part of phase two at the end of 2024.

Other facilities will include a 8,060 sq ft Gym and wellness centre, The Forge digital offices (17,677 sq ft) and members club, cafes, bars, creative studios, and retail units including a Tesco express.
