= William R. Newland =

New Zealand artist

William Rupert Newland (5 February 1919 – 30 April 1998) was a New Zealand-born studio potter who lived in England after the Second World War.

From 1945 to 1947 he studied painting at the Chelsea School of Art. He studied art education at the Institute of Education from 1947 to 1948 where he learned pottery under Beth Wright, who sent him to the Central School of Art and Design in 1948. There he studied ceramics under Dora Billington. He taught evening classes in ceramics at the Central School of Art & Design from 1949 to 1965. In 1949 he began a teaching career at the Institute of Education, where his students included James Tower, Nicholas Vergette and Margaret Hine. Newland and Hine married in 1950. He continued at the Institute until 1982, when he retired from teaching

In 1949, Newland, Vergette and Hine visited Málaga in Spain where they saw tin-glazed earthenware. In 1950, they set up a studio in London working in this medium, which was very different from the prevailing fashion for high-fired stoneware represented by Bernard Leach. Their first exhibition included tiles and walls panels, as a result of which they were commissioned to decorate several coffee bars, which were then new and fashionable. Newland and Hine decorated the Golden Egg chain of coffee bars and restaurants in the 1960s.

As their work showed the influence of Picasso, Bernard Leach derisively called them "Picassoettes". Picasso had been making tin-glazed pottery in the south of France since the end of the war. In 1950 the Arts Council mounted an exhibition called "Picasso in Provence". The potter Kenneth Clark described Picasso's influence on ceramics as follows: "During this period of change Picasso with his daring, invention, colour-sense and imagination, shattered and shocked the traditionalist potters with his experiments in ceramics. ... [H]e added fresh life and new direction to ceramics ... " Newland himself said, "It wasn't that we were anti-Leach - but there were other things to do."

Newland's style went out of fashion in the 1960s and most of his work for coffee bars has been lost. There has been a recent revival of interest as evidenced by the references cited below.

== Bibliography ==
- Carnegy, Daphne, Tin-glazed Earthenware (A&C Black/Chilton Book Company, 1993) ISBN 0-7136-3718-8
- Clark, Kenneth, Practical Pottery and Ceramics (Studio Books, 1964)
- Harrod, Tanya, "The forgotten fifties", Crafts, 1989, pp. 30–33.
- Reilly, Paul and Low, Helen, "London coffee bars", Architecture and Building, March 1955, pp. 83–95.
- Jeffrey Jones, In Search of the Picassoettes
