= The Golden Egg (restaurant) =

British restaurant chain

The Golden Egg was a British table service fast food restaurant chain, founded in 1958 and now defunct. They have also been described as cafeterias and coffee bars. They were known for their bright colourful interiors and innovative use of lighting and design.

== History ==
The first Golden Egg restaurant was opened in 1958 by Samuel Kaye and his sons Philip Kaye and Reginald Kaye, in Duke Street in the West End of London.

They used William R. Newland, Margaret Hine and Nicholas Vergette to create handmade pottery as part of their innovative restaurant interior design.

By 1965 there were thirty-six restaurants in the chain, many in the London area, and Philip Kaye by then was the chairman. In 1965, Golden Egg bought Angus Steak Houses.

In 1970, the franchising for Golden Egg restaurants was sold to J Lyons, the owners of Wimpy, and in 1976, they sold it to United Biscuits.

In 2014, The Golden Egg building, built in the 1960s in Kings Square, Gloucester, was demolished after lying derelict for a decade.

In 2020, restaurant critic Jay Rayner called it "a mildly polished greasy spoon chain".
