= Margaret Hine =

British studio potter (1927–1987)

- Born: 1927
- Died: 1987 (aged 59–60)
- Occupation: Studio Potter
- Spouse: William R. Newland 1950-1987 (her death)
- Children: 2

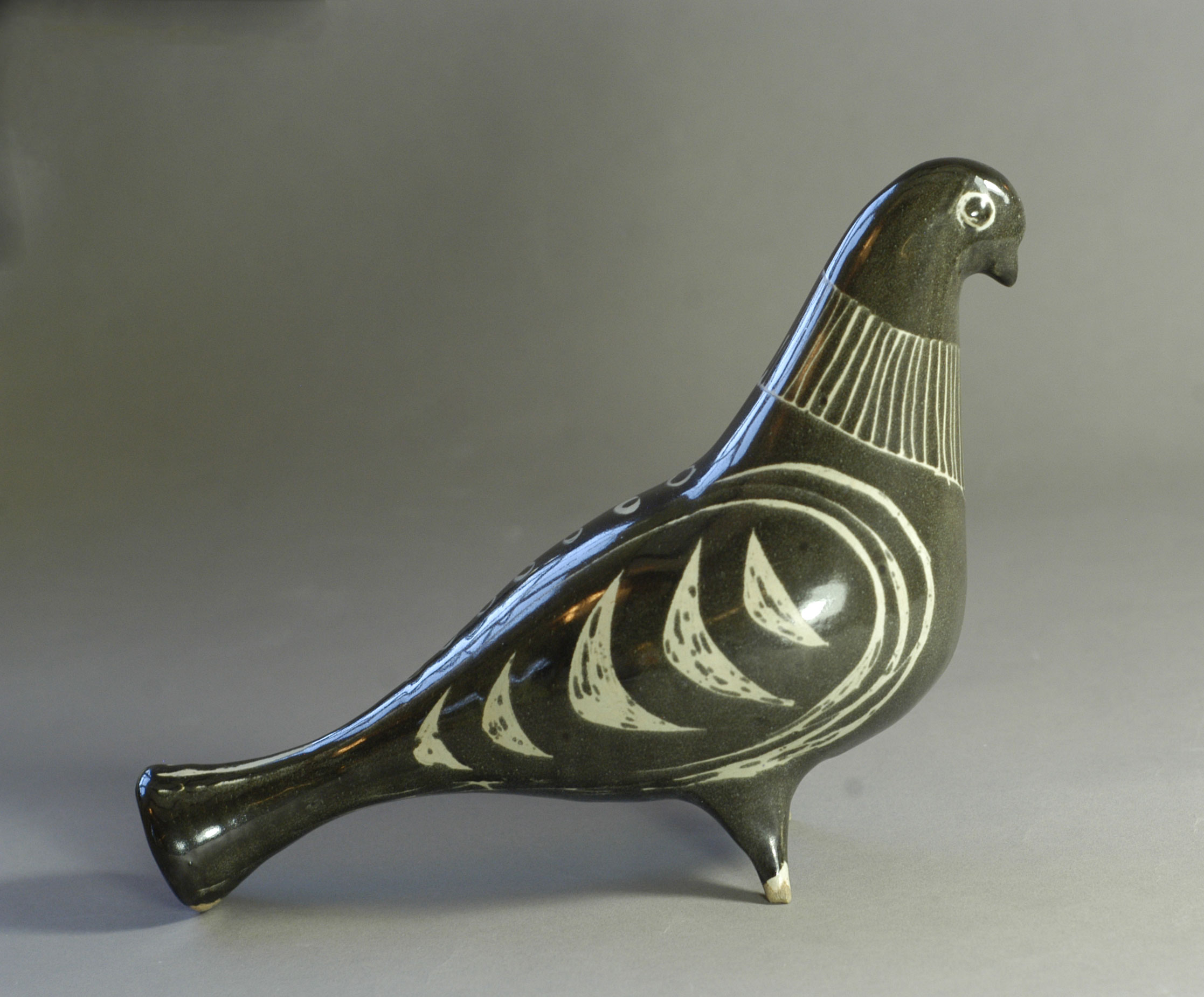
Ceramic bird by Margaret Hine, 1950s. Glazed stoneware with sgraffito decoration.

Margaret Hine (1927–1987) was a British studio potter. She was known in the 1950s for her animal figures but also produced painted dishes and ceramic murals.

== Life ==
She studied at Derby School of Art and then went to the Central School of Arts and Crafts, where she studied pottery under Dora Billington, and the Institute of Education, where she studied under William R. Newland. From 1949 to 1954 she had a studio in Bayswater, London, with Newland and Nicolas Vergette.

She married Newland in 1950, with whom she had two children, and in 1954 set up a studio with him in Prestwood, Buckinghamshire. Their archive is held by the University of Wales, Cardiff.
