= Kings Walk Shopping Centre =

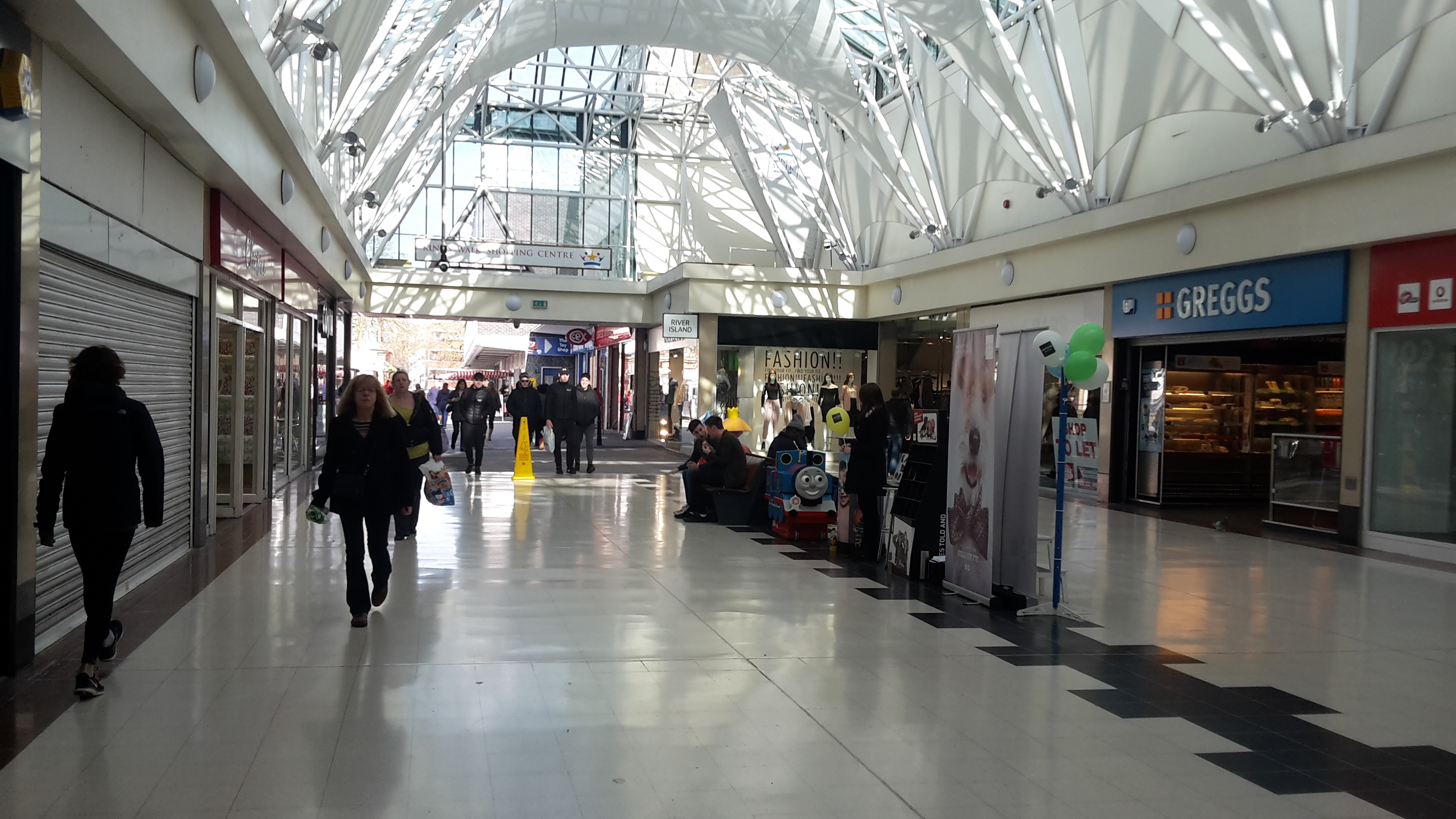
- Location: Gloucester, England
- Coordinates: 51.8646334°N 2.24505711°W
- Address: 37-41 Clarence Street
- Opened: 1969 - 1972
- Developer: Gloucester City Council (Land), Aviva Investors (Shops)
- Owner: Reef Estates
- Num. of stores: 29
- Floors: 1
- Parking: 290 spaces (16 Disabled spaces)
- Website: kingswalk.co.uk

Kings Walk Shopping Centre is a single-storey indoor shopping centre in Gloucester, England. Built between 1969 and 1972, it is part of the Kings Quarter development that includes an outdoor pedestrianised area.

Beneath a trapdoor in the centre is the Kings Walk Bastion, the remains of a 1,900 year old Roman city wall and tower.

== History ==
Before it became a shopping centre, it was called Kings Street. This was primarily an industrial area and included a factory, which was built in 1873, for the printer John Bellows. This area was gradually commercialised with a lot of rebuilding done after the First World War between the 1920s and the 1930s. The north part of Kings Street was demolished in the 1920s when Kings Square was built. One of the largest commercial developments took place between 1927 and 1929 and involved the creation of The Oxbode and Kings Square. It also involved the demolition of the many buildings in St Aldate Street, Kings Street and New Inn Lane, making room for new commercial buildings. Kings Square was enlarged in the 1960s and the space was made for the Kings Walk Shopping Centre to be developed. In a large redevelopment of central Gloucester between 1969 and 1972 which involved Kings Street, Kings Square, Dog Lane and Clarence Street, shops were built on both sides of Kings Street and it was covered becoming pedestrianised indoor area called Kings Walk. Eastgate House, an Adamish stone fronted building, was demolished when the shopping centre was developed. A rooftop car park was built over the shopping centre. A pedestrian footbridge on the second floor spanned over Eastgate Street to link the Eastgate Shopping Centre and Kings Walk however, this has now been closed off.

In June 2016, the investment firm Vixcroft made a bid to buy the shopping centre from Aviva Investors, who have owned the shopping centre since 1969, for £25 Million. However, due to a clause in the contract regarding Brexit the deal fell through. In July 2017, Reef Estates approached Aviva Investments and successfully completed a deal to buy the shopping centre.

In March 2018, it was announced that £12 million would be invested to reface the shopping centre and remodel shopfronts in Kings Square and Eastgate Street. The work is planned to be completed by 2020.

== Kings Walk Bastion ==
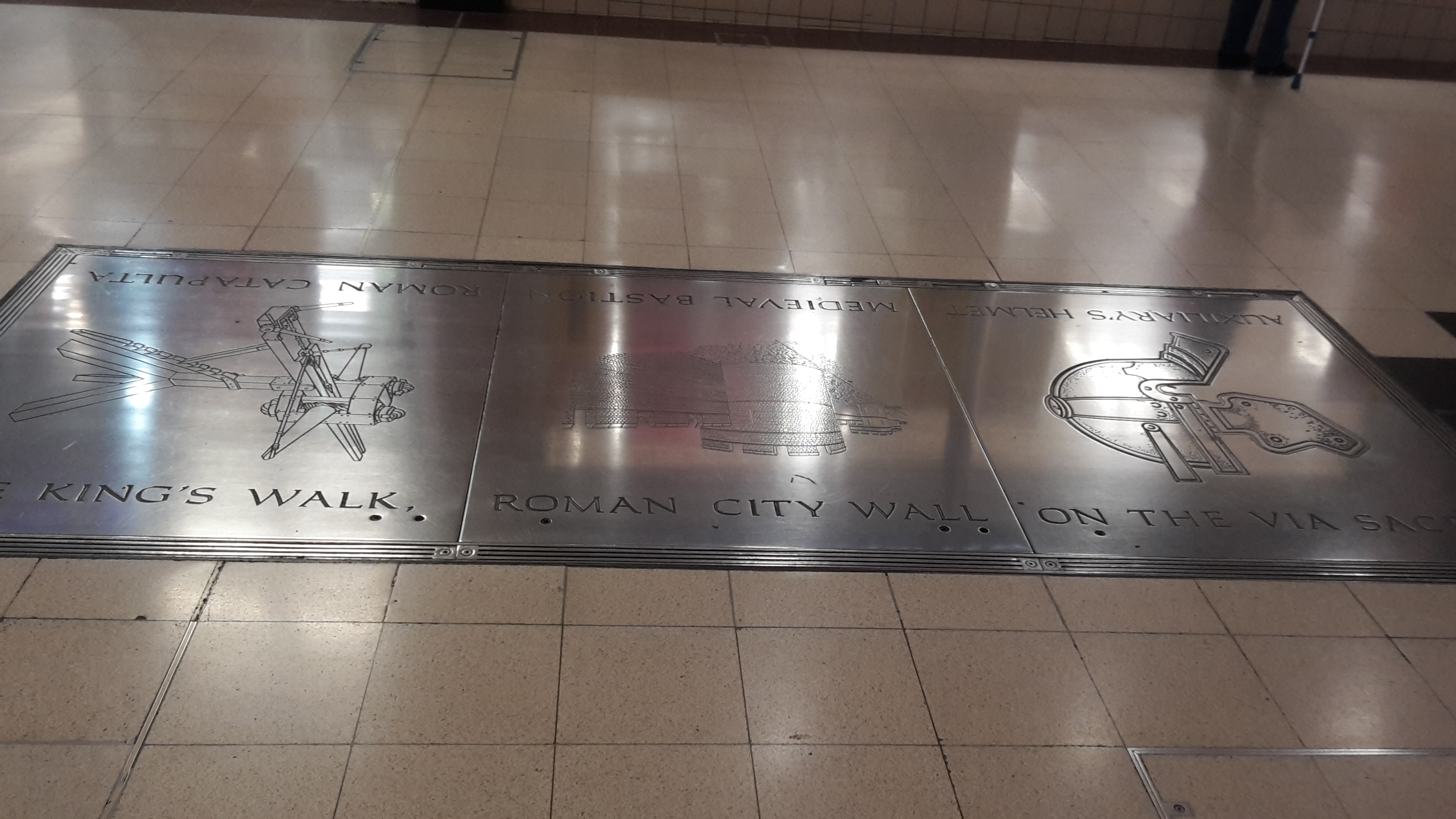
Sideways view of the trapdoor to Kings Walk Bastion in Kings Walk Shopping Centre

The Kings Walk Bastion is a 1,900 year old Roman city wall and tower, located beneath a trapdoor in the Kings Walk Shopping Centre. The earliest part of the bastion is thought to be a Roman fortress built around 60AD. Originally the bastion consisted of a sand and clay rampart with a wooden tower and a defensive ditch. At the end of the first century, the fortress was decommissioned so a new city could be built. This was intended to be a Roman Colonia. Stone parts of the bastion were built in the 3rd and 4th centuries, from Cotswold limestone. This wall was approximately five metres high and three metres wide and made part of the wall that surrounded the whole city at the time. The fourth century sections of the wall consist of massive blocks of stone with small rectangular holes on the inside where scaffolding would have been set. A semi-circular tower was added in the thirteenth century on the outside of the wall.

Archaeologists began investigations in Kings Square in 1934, where they found the corner of a Roman city wall and remains of a medieval tower 2 to 3 metres underground. The site under Kings Street and Kings Square was fully excavated by archaeologists between May and June 1969 before the redevelopment of Kings Street. In 1975, the site was opened to the public however it had to be closed in the mid-1990s due to underground flooding. In 2016, the Gloucester city council restored electricity to the site, installed a pump and lighting. Then on the 8 September 2016 the site was reopened to the public. It is thought that the remains of a Postern Gate are also located under Kings Walk but the exact location of the gate is still unknown.
