= Bernard Moore (potter) =

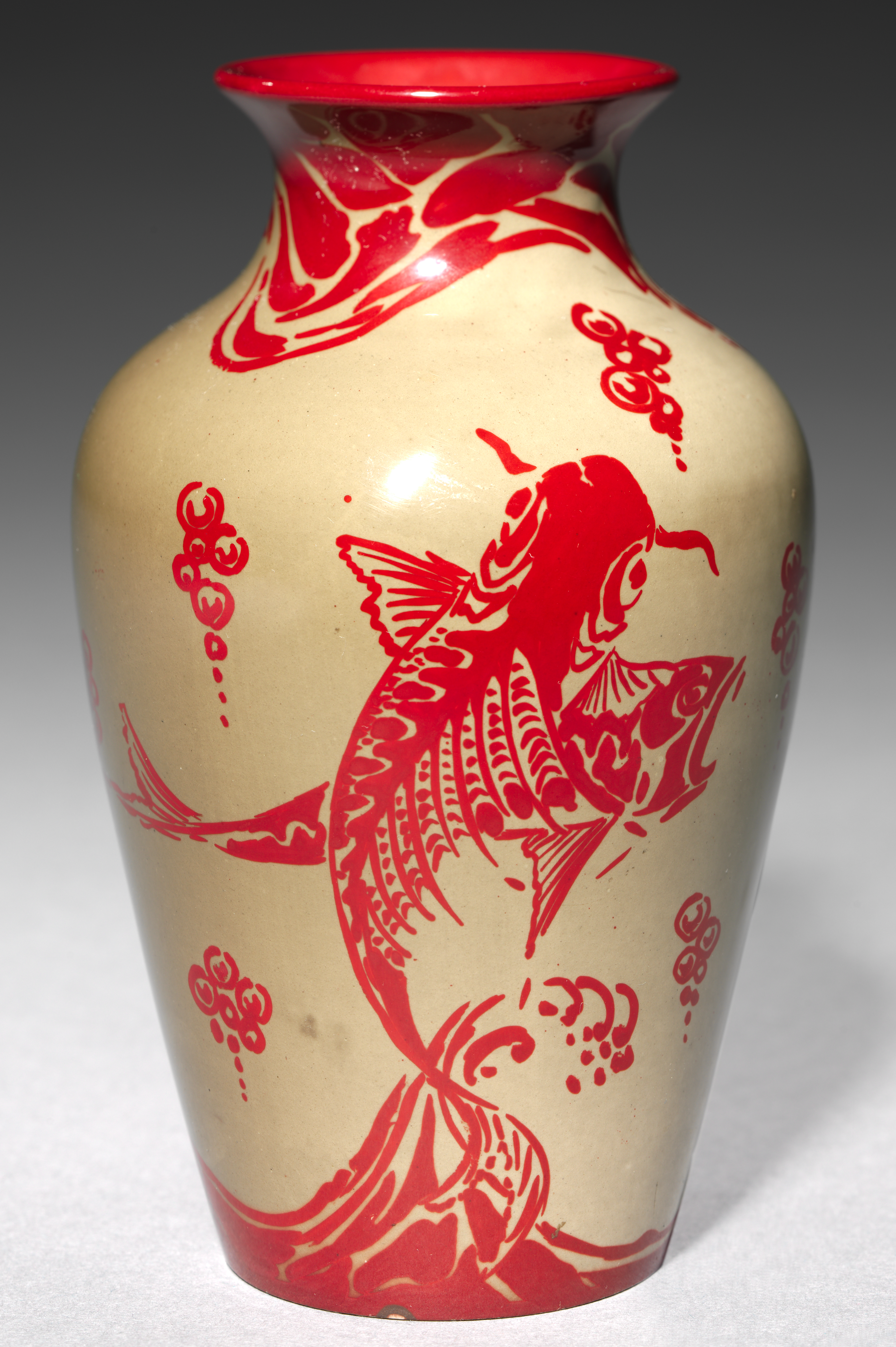
Porcelain vase by Bernard Moore in the Cleveland Museum of Art, c. 1900

Bernard Moore (1850–1935) was an English pottery manufacturer and ceramic chemist known for the innovative production of art pottery, especially his flambé glazes and pottery with reduced lustre pigments. After forty years running his family's pottery business, he set up his own pottery studio in Stoke-on-Trent in 1905 where he made art pottery with the help of a few assistants. After closing the studio in 1915, he worked as a ceramic consultant.

== Life and work ==
Moore was born in 1850 in Normacot, Staffordshire. In 1865 he began working for his father Samuel whose business was renamed Samuel Moore & Son. On his father´s death two years later, he took over the running of the firm. He was later joined by his younger brother Samuel Vincent Moore. From 1873 to 1905 they traded as Moore Bros.

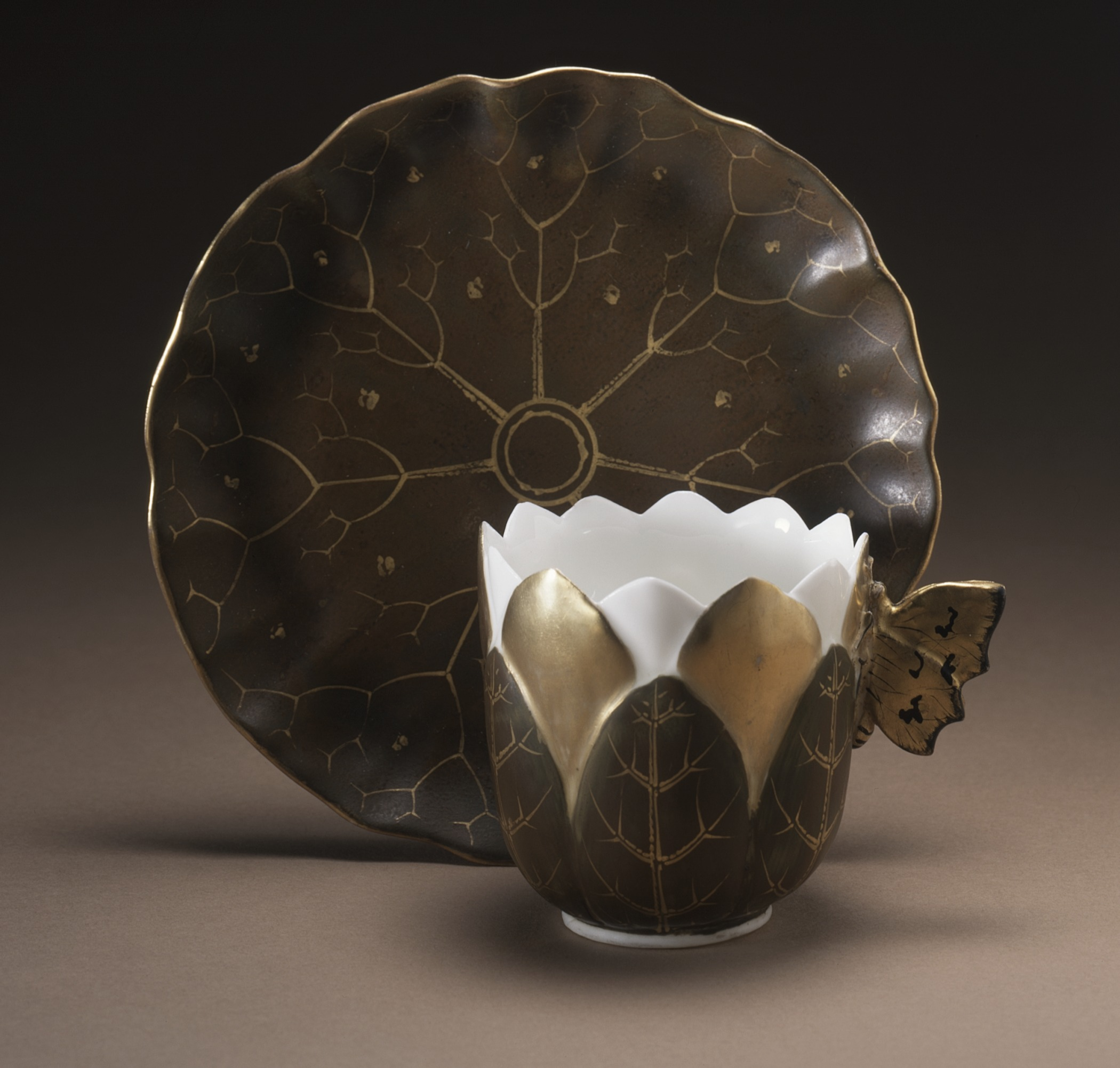
Waterlily Coffee Cup and Butterfly Handle, porcelain, Moore Brothers, c. 1880 LACMA, in the style of the Aesthetic Movement

Moore's knowledge of ceramic chemistry was considerable and he was widely consulted by the ceramics industry on technical matters. “Throughout the 1880s and 1890s it is likely that he was experimenting with and perfecting the specialist and difficult glazes with which his name is now principally associated.” In 1902 he was elected president of the British Ceramic Society.

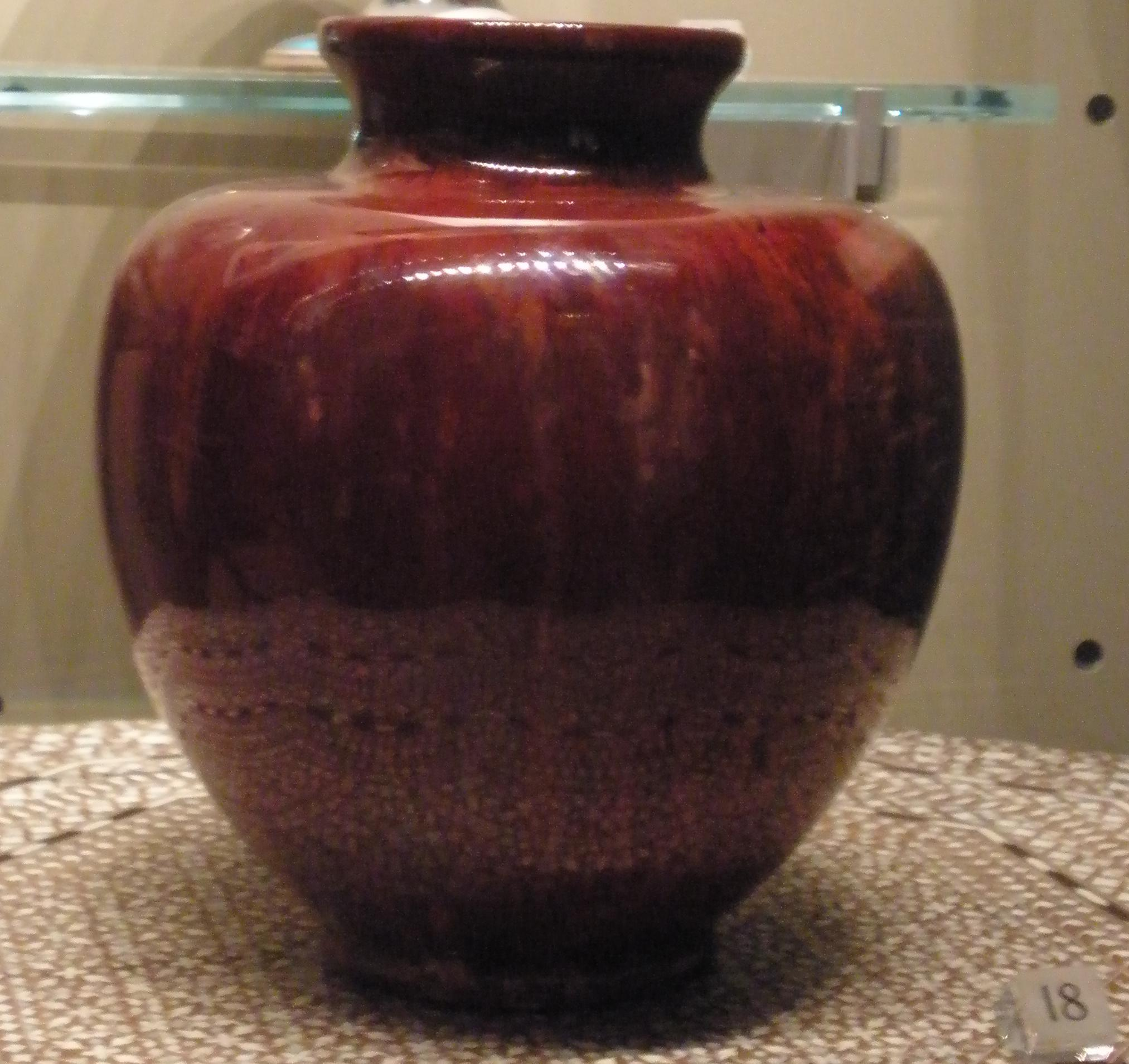
Red flambé glaze vase, 1903, V&A Museum

In 1905 he sold the business and he set up a small factory in Wolfe Street, Stoke-on-Trent, specialising in the production of pottery with flambé glazes and reduced lustre pigments. In 1906 his son Bernard Joseph Moore began working with him. Moore commissioned the pots from another maker and had them decorated at Wolfe Street. His decorators included Dora Billington, Hilda Beardmore, Hilda Lindop, Reginald Tomlinson, and John Adams.

Flambé glazes make use of metallic oxides, usually iron or copper, fired to temperatures up to 1500 °C in a flame-burning kiln. At a critical moment, the air feeding the flame is shut off, and the flame, seeking oxygen for combustion, combines with oxygen in the glaze oxides, reducing the amount of oxygen they contain and changing their colour. The potter manages the process, which is not entirely predictable, to produce reds, purples, blues, lilacs and greens.

Frederick A. Rhead, a contemporary writer, said of Moore in 1906, “He is master of all the resources of the potter’s craft, and his work alone shows Staffordshire still capable of coping with the potters of France. It is technically triumphant, and it is quite delightful (though in a sense disappointing) to find in his show-room a case of pottery - perfect in colour and artistic feeling - which he will not sell, but prefers to retain for mere pride in its accomplishment.”

Moore exhibited internationally and received many awards for his ceramics. In 1910, a fire at the Brussels Exhibition destroyed much of his work.

He closed the business at Wolfe Street in 1915 but continued to work as a ceramic consultant. He died in 1935.

There is a portrait of him by Oswald Birley in the Potteries Museum and Art Gallery.
