= Kenneth Clark (ceramicist) =

New Zealand-born British ceramicist

Kenneth Clark MBE
- Born: Kenneth Inman Carr Clark; 31 July 1922; Wellington, New Zealand
- Died: 10 June 2012 (aged 89)
- Known for: Ceramic tiles
- Spouse: Ann Wynn Reeves (m. 1954)
- Relatives: William Inman (great-grandfather); John Carr (4 x great-uncle)

Kenneth Inman Carr Clark MBE (31 July 1922 – 10 June 2012) was a New Zealand-born British ceramicist, best known for his decorative tiles.

== Early life and family ==
Born in Wellington, New Zealand, on 31 July 1922, Clark was the son of Aubrey Sherman Clark, a farms inspector, and his wife, Annie Barbara Louisa Clark (née Inman). Through his mother, Clark was a great-grandson of William Inman, founder of passenger shipping company, the Inman Line. On his father's side, he was related to the 18th-century English architect, John Carr.

Clark spent most of his childhood in Nelson and was educated at Nelson College from 1937 to 1941, where he won several prizes for drawing. In World War II, he initially enlisted in the 2nd New Zealand Expeditionary Force, but subsequently transferred to the Royal Navy. He was present during the Normandy landings, and was mentioned in dispatches.

== Ceramics ==
After the end of the war, Clark remained in Britain and took up an ex-serviceman's scholarship at London's Slade School of Art, where his teachers included Stanley Spencer. He continued his studies at the Central School of Arts and Crafts, being taught by Dora Billington, Clark went on to teach there himself for 25 years, as well as at Goldsmiths' College.

In 1953, Clark and Ann Wynn Reeves, whom he married the following year, founded Kenneth Clark Ceramics in the London district of Fitzrovia. The studio relocated to Lewes in 1989. The couple used their complementary skills in their practice: Ann designed many of the motifs and decorative emblems that Kenneth applied to his ceramics, and he used his technical knowledge to recreate glazes used by William De Morgan. He reproduced decorative tiles for Debenham House, as well as the dairy at Windsor Castle following the 1992 fire.

As well as tiles, Clark made single hand-thrown domestic ware items, and in the 1960s designed for the Denby and Bristol Potteries, including the "Mooncurve" range for the latter.

Clark served as chairman of the Society of Designer Craftsmen. In the 1980s he assisted the Romanian government with the revitalisation of the pottery industry in that country, and later played a similar role in Afghanistan.

In the 1990 Queen's Birthday Honours Clark was appointed a Member of the Order of the British Empire for services to art and design. The following year he was awarded the Society of Designer Craftsmen's centennial medal.

== Writings ==
Clark wrote four books on pottery, including The Potter's Manual (1983), regarded as a standard reference work in the field, and The Tile: Making, Designing and Using, published in 2002.
