= Kings Square, Gloucester =

Market square in Gloucester, Gloucester, England

Kings Square
- Market square
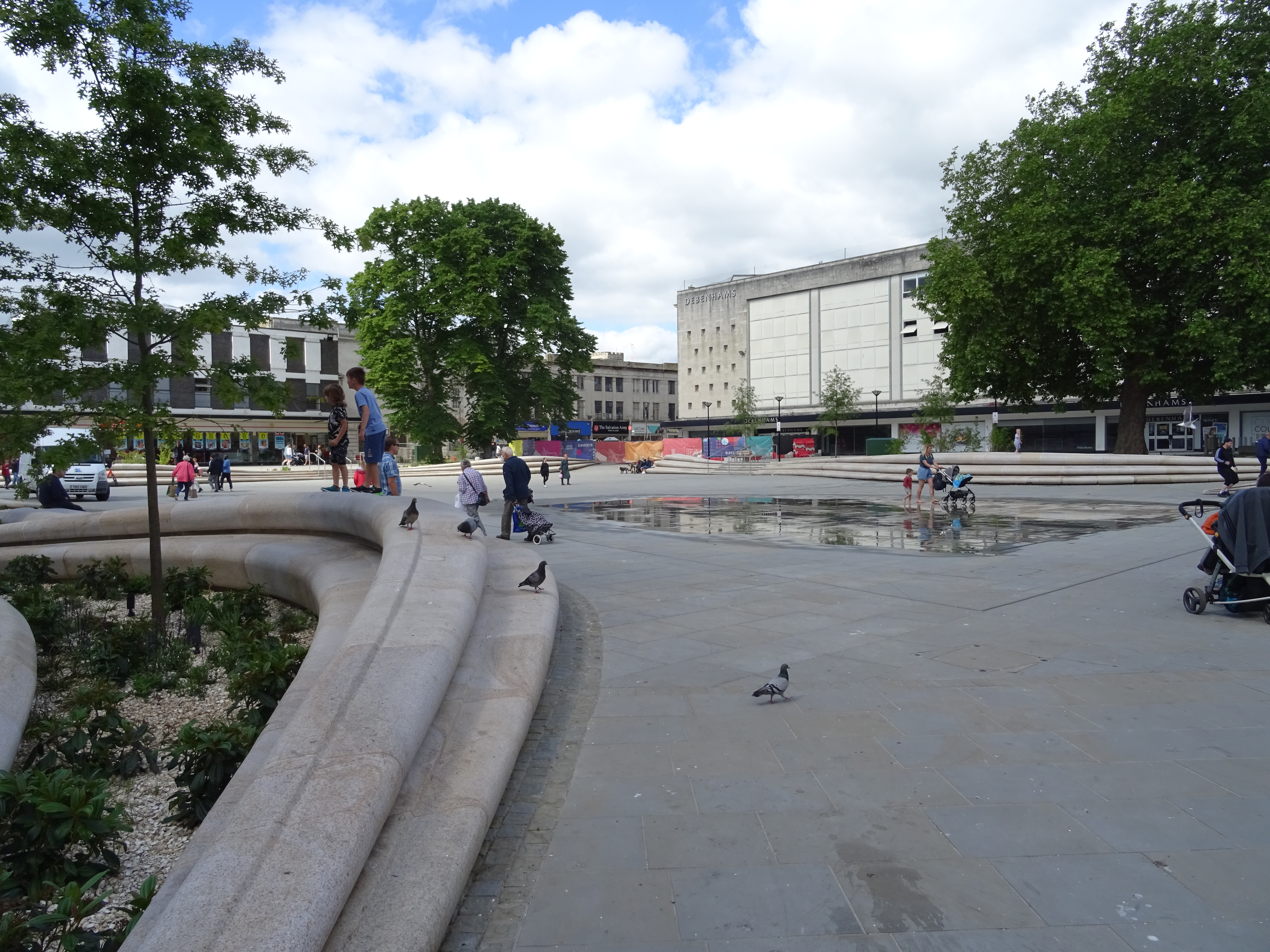
- Photo of Kings Square, Gloucester
- Features: Shops, Pubs, Market, Seating
- Constructed: 1927-1929
- Opened: 1929
- Surface: Concrete
- Owner: Gloucester City Council
- Location: Gloucester, England
- Address: Kings Square; Gloucester
- Interactive map of Kings Square
- Coordinates: 51°51′55.6″N 2°14′34.5″W

Kings Square is a market square in Gloucester, England connecting to Kings Walk Shopping Centre, Market Parade, The Oxbode and St Aldate Street.

== History ==
Kings Square was built in between 1927 and 1929. This involved the demolition of shops and houses in the area, which also affected St Aldate Street, New Lane and Kings Street where the north end of the street was demolished. At this time the Oxbode was also built. Due to the building of the Oxbode and Kings Square the west part of Gloucester started to deteriorate as the city was expanded southwards and eastwards. Originally Kings Square included the main bus station for Gloucester and a car park. It remained like this until the 1960s. In the early 1960s an extension of the Bon Marché department store, originally owned by Drapery Trust and is now Debenhams, filled part of the west side of the square. Showrooms for the Midlands Electricity store were built on the east side.

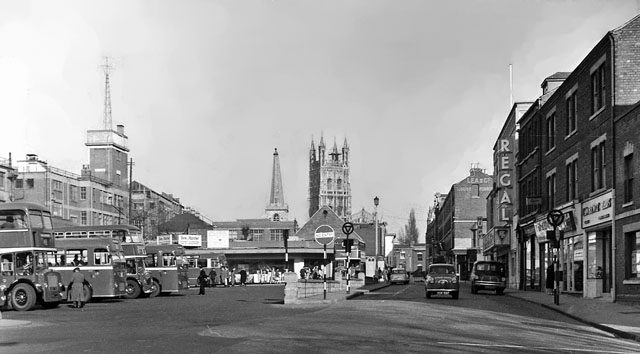
Part of the bus station in Kings Square in 1962

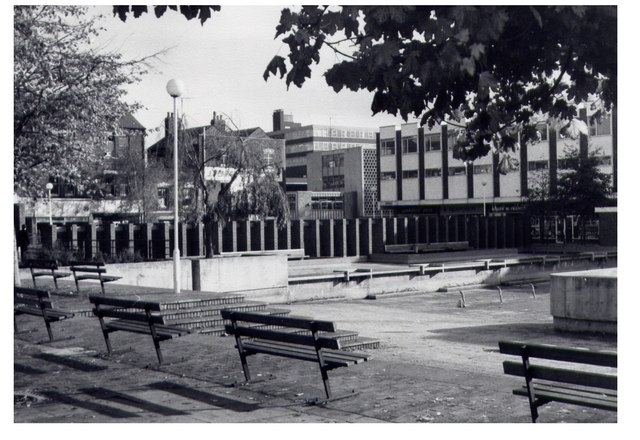
Kings Square (1976)

Between 1969 and 1974, during a large redevelopment of central Gloucester, the square was redesigned and new shops were built on the east and south sides. Water fountains with stepping stones and paddling areas were created in the centre of the square. The Square was officially opened to the public in 1972. Also at this time Kings Street was covered to become an indoor shopping centre called Kings Walk Shopping Centre. The north side of the square was redeveloped in 1984. In 2006, The square was levelled and concreted, as the water fountains had fallen into disrepair. On 20 January 2014, The Golden Egg building, previously a restaurant built in the 1960s, was demolished. At the same time, other minor improvements were also made including repainting and the addition of new benches. The square is now mainly used for markets.

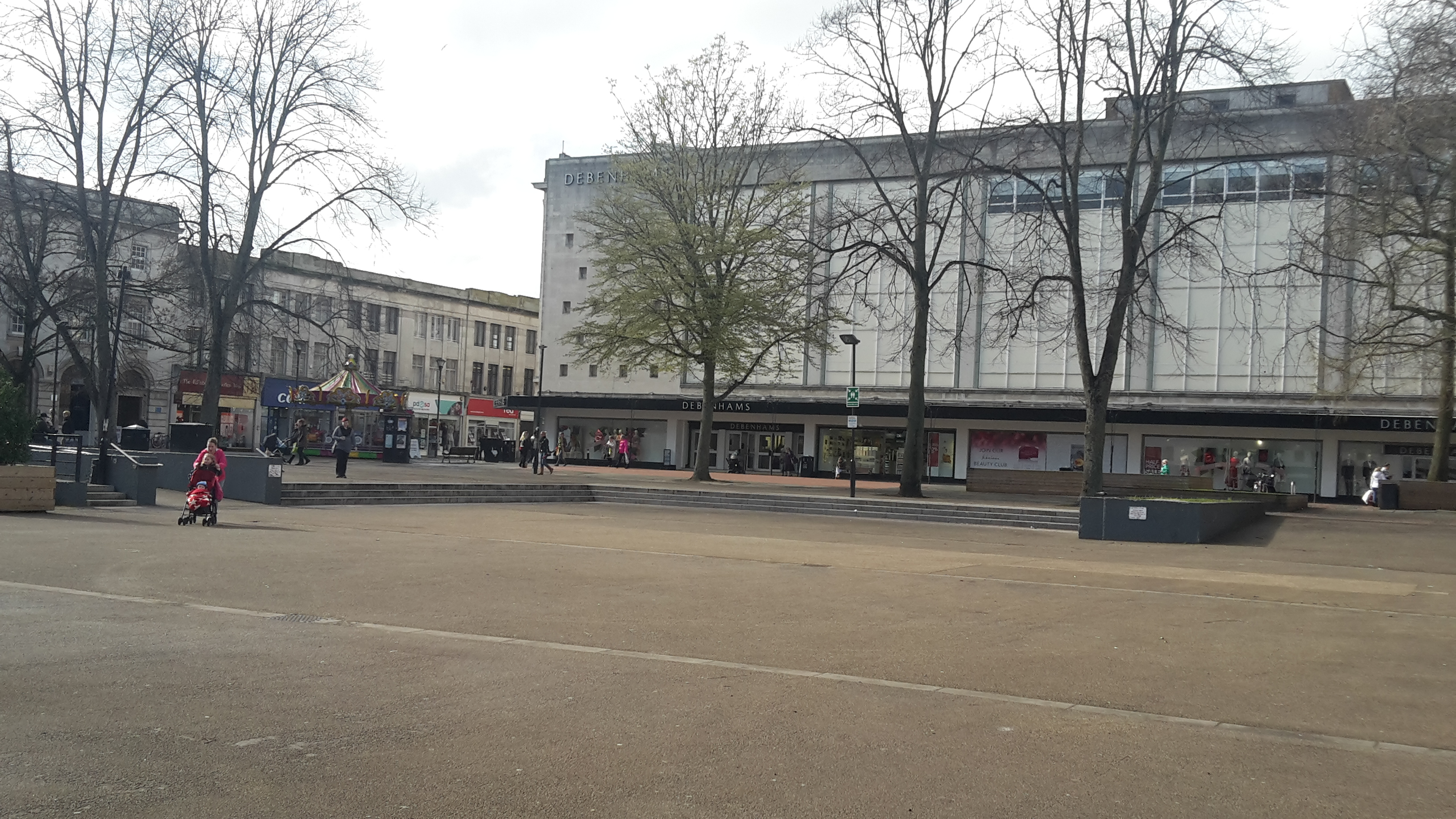
Kings Square, Gloucester (2014-2022)

The square is part of the Kings Quarter redevelopment project, the plans are for Kings Square to remain as a public open space. £5 million has been spent on the regeneration of Kings Square. The new design is based on the Severn Bore with wave-shaped granite seating areas, water fountains and coloured lighting. The development started in August 2021 and the square was reopened on the 30 April 2022.

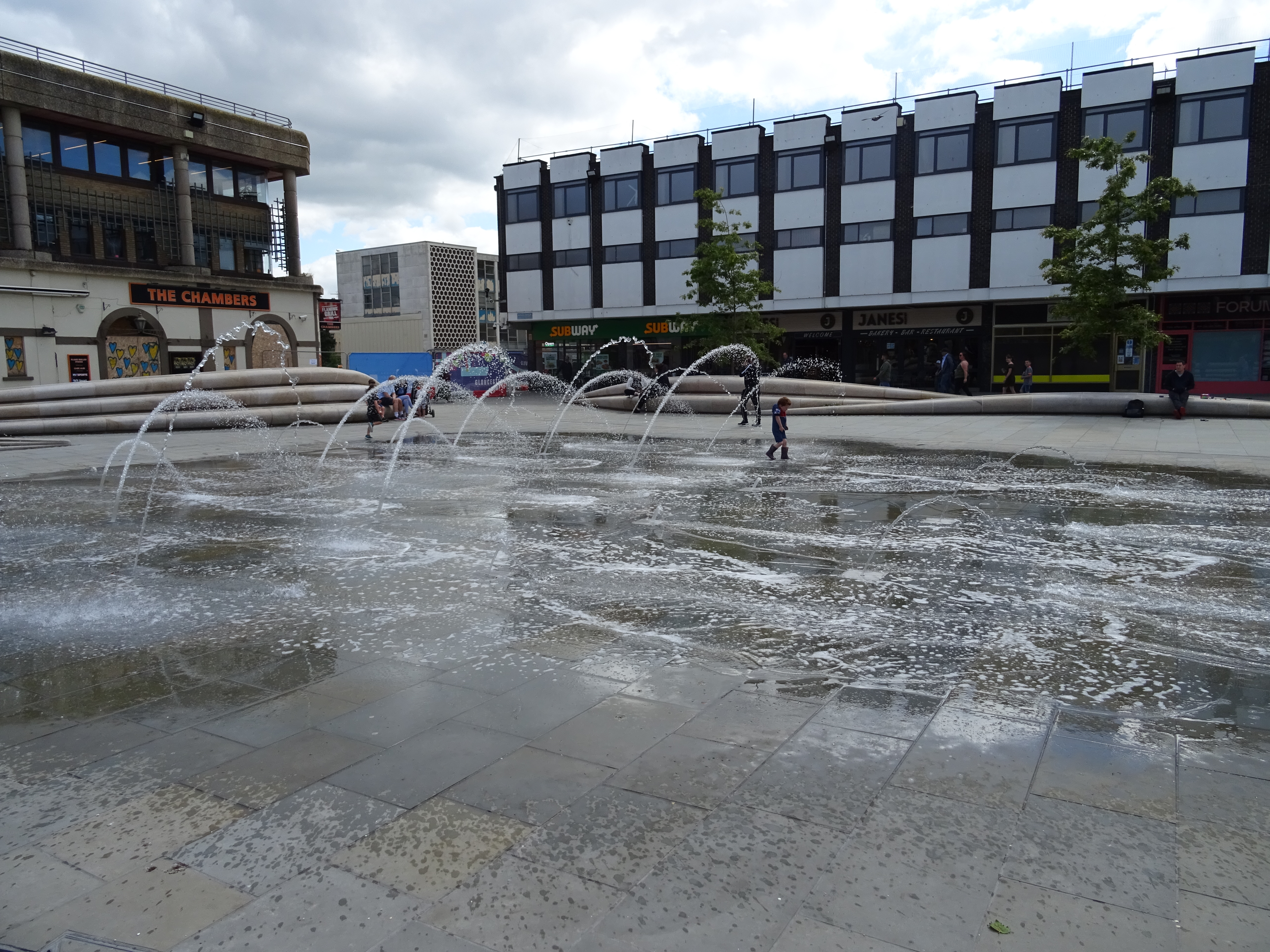
Kings Square Water Fountain in 2022

== Gloucester Post Office ==
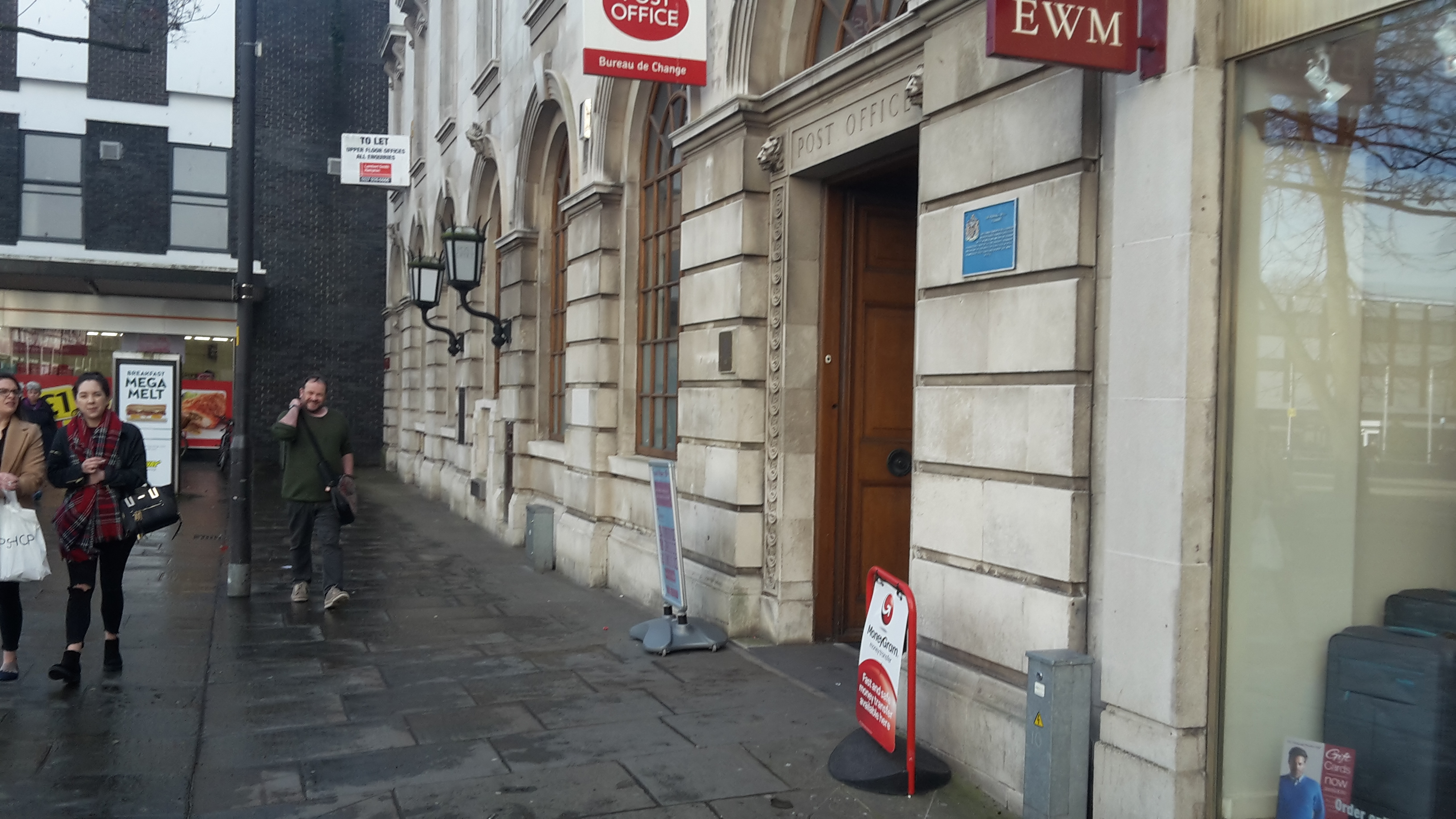
Gloucester Post Office (2017)

The central post office for Gloucester was opened in 1934 in Kings Square. It was the city's first purpose built head post office. The building was designed by Henry E. Seccombe of H.M. Office of Works, London. The building is three storeys high, made mainly of brick and stone with concrete floors and beams, the front is faced with Portland stone, the roof is made of slate and asphalt. Two English oak doors are at the entrance of the building. It replaced the head post office in George Street by Gloucester railway station and the existing post office on the corner of Westgate Street and St Johns Lane.

== The Regal ==
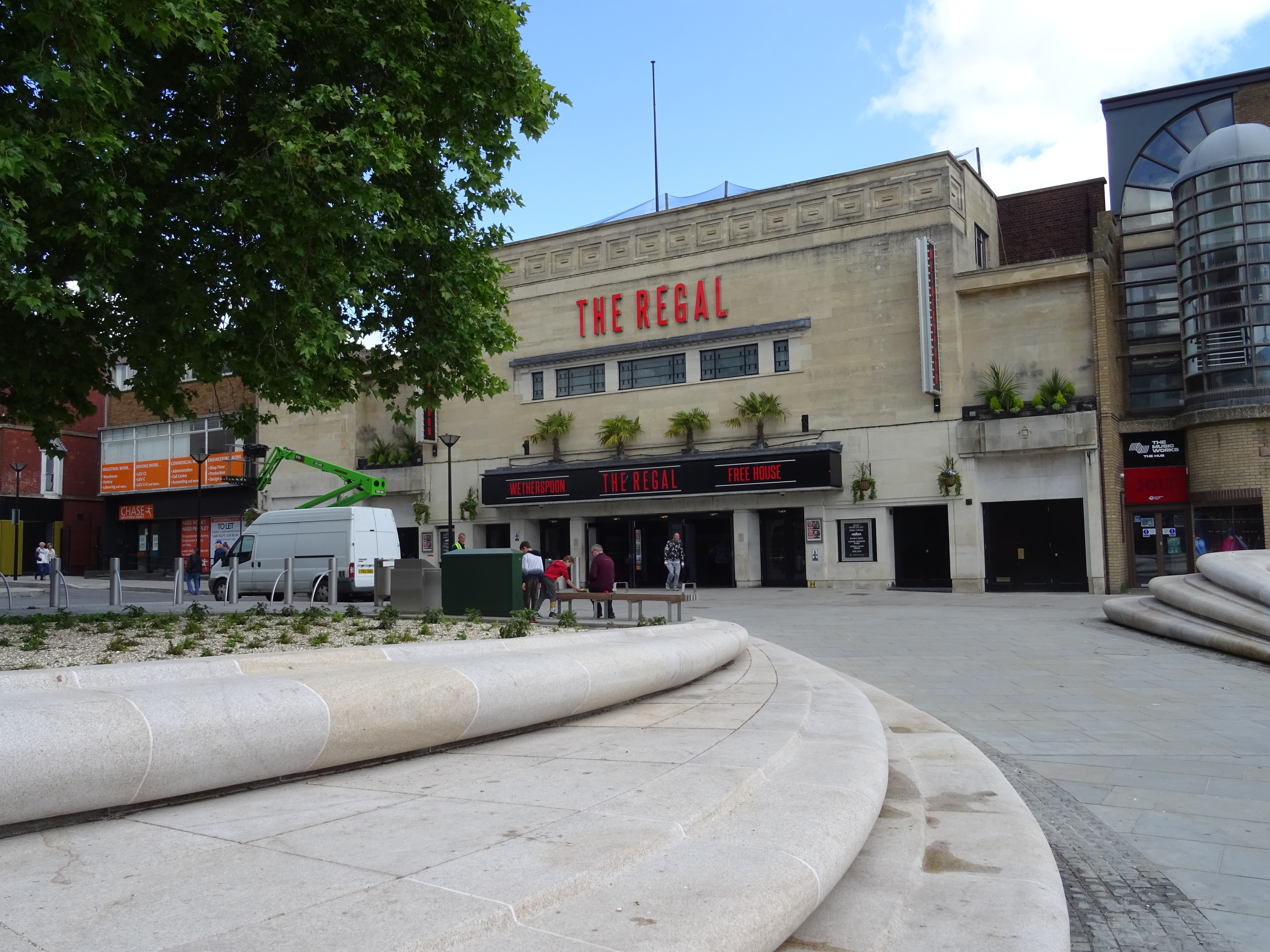
Front of The Regal

Construction work started, at the north side of Kings Square, in 1939 paid for by the Associated British Cinemas. However, due to World War II, the construction was halted until 1955. The Regal Cinema was finally opened on 19 March 1956. It had single auditorium that was used for films, live theatre and music. It was renamed ABC Regal in 1963 and then it was taken over by EMI in February 1974. On 6 April 1974 it was closed to be converted to a triple screen cinema with 1,468 seats, and reopened on 22 July 1974. It was taken over by the Cannon Group in 1986 and renamed Cannon. It closed down on 12 December 1990.

Local amateur dramatic groups like the Gods often performed there. Cliff Richard, Cilla Black, Adam Faith and Roy Orbison made appearances there from the late 1950s and The Beatles appeared there in March 1963. Morecambe and Wise appeared there in 1971 with total of 6,000 people attended their four performances.

The building was taken over by J D Wetherspoons and converted into a pub. It opened on 3 April 1996 and is called The Regal.
