= Nicholas Vergette =

British potter & sculptor (1923–1974)

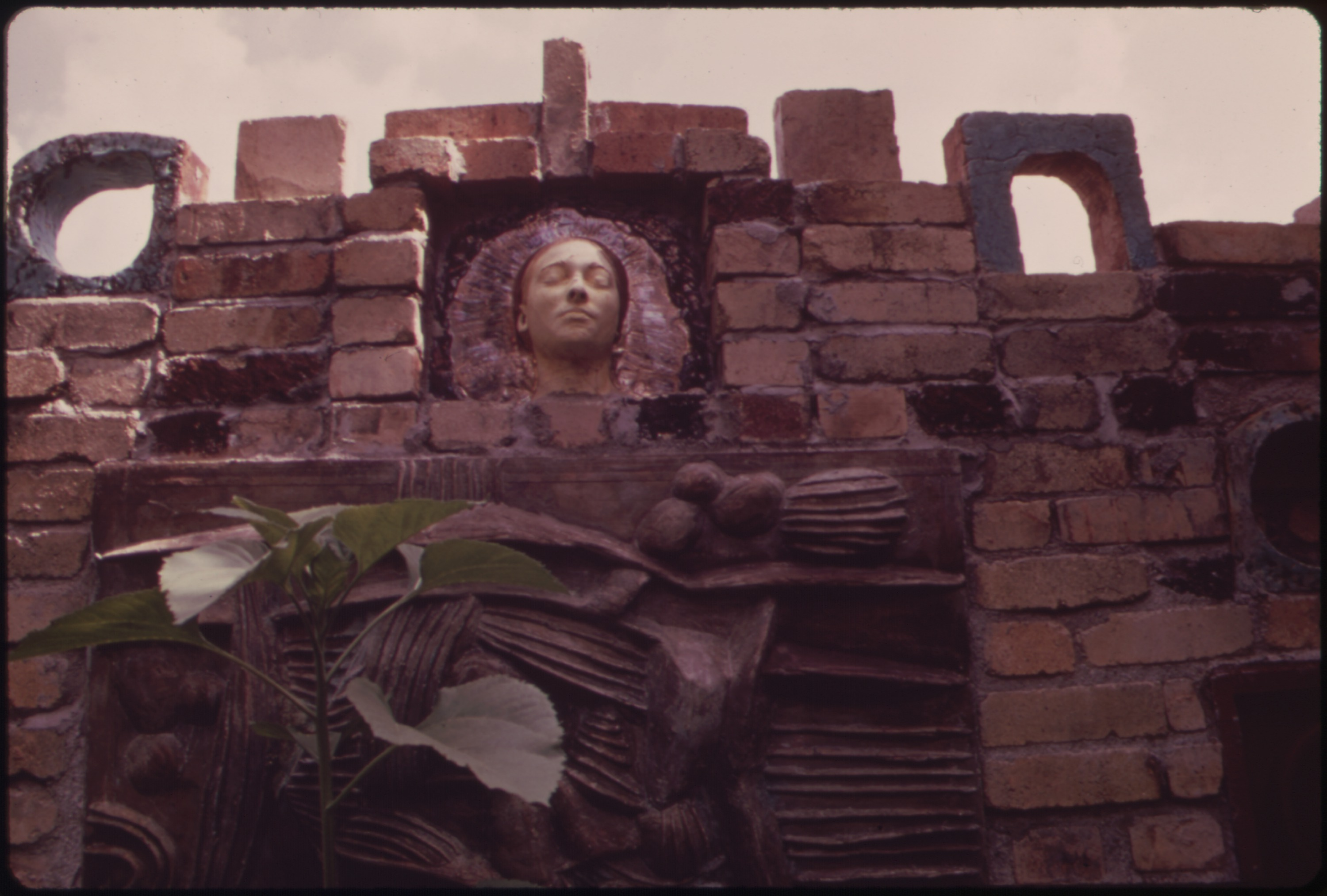
Sculpture of Nicks Vergette at his home near Carbondale, 1974.

Nicholas Vergette (1923–1974) was a British potter and sculptor, who produced ceramic murals and figurative works for architectural settings during the 1950s and 1960s. He was Professor of Art at the Southern Illinois University, School of Art and Design from 1960 to 1974.

== Biography ==
Vergette was born in Lincolnshire in 1923. He studied pottery under Dora Billington at the Central School of Art and Design in London.

In Britain during the 1950s Vergette, Alan Caiger-Smith, Margaret Hine and others including the Rye Pottery made tin-glazed pottery, going against the trend in studio pottery towards stoneware. They all were given the name of "Piccassettes" by the studio potter and art teacher Bernard Leach.

In the early 1950s Newland, Hine and Vergette "formed something of a coterie", sharing a studio in Bayswater and exhibitions at the Crafts Centre and the Studio Club in Piccadilly. The three of them also had participated in a holiday in Spain in 1949 where they "went to Malaga and studied throwing and tin-glaze techniques".

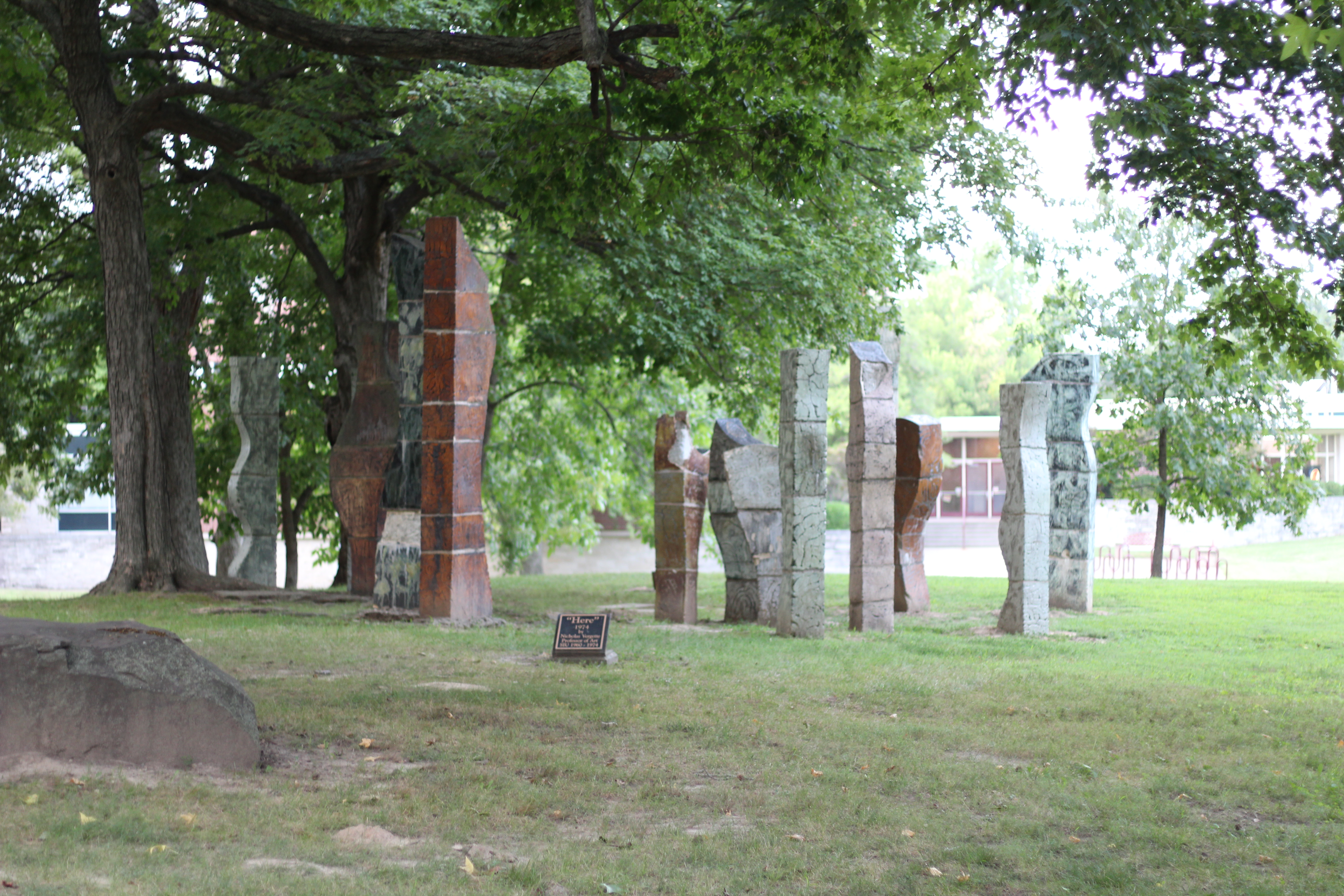
"Here" by Nicholas Vergette as seen on the SIU campus.

Vergette emigrated to the United States in 1957. From 1960 to 1974 he was Professor of Art at the School of Art and Design of the Southern Illinois University (SIU).

Vergette died of cancer in 1974, two months after completing "Here", a large sculpture piece on the SIU campus.

== Reception ==
Dora Billington in her 1953 article "The Younger English Potters" in The Studio noted:

Sculptor potters are becoming aware of the possibility of the thrown shape as 'something to work on', following, probably quite unconsciously, the lead of the Martin Brothers, and dare one say it? - perhaps a little more consciously, Picasso! But the influences, which are in any case unavoidable, are completely submerged in the abundant vitality and originality of three potters, William Newland, Nicholas Vergette and Margaret Hine

Darren Dean in a 1994 article entitled William Newland, Margaret Hine and Nicholas Vergette, 1949-1954 concluded:

these three potters can be seen to bridge the gap between the disciplined approaches of pre-war craft practices and the free and experimental studio ceramics which developed in the 1960s and after.

Donhauser (1978) recalled, that "Dirk Hubers and Nicolas Vergette are two examples of potters who, through their distinctive form language, added to the diversity of style and attitudes which comprised the American studio-pottery scene during the 1950s."
