= Gloucester Transport Hub =

Bus station in Gloucester, England

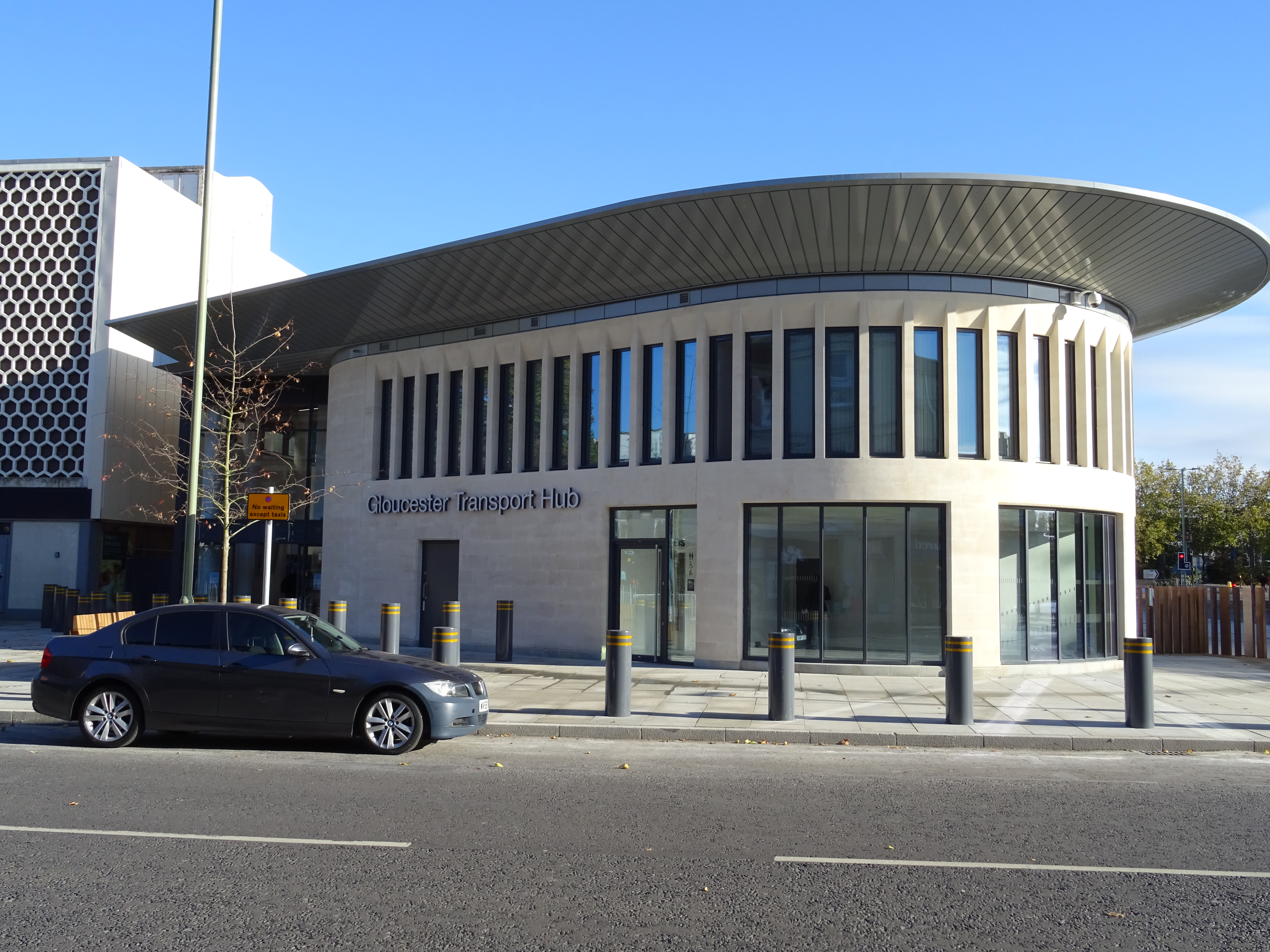
- Front of Gloucester Transport Hub in October 2018

General information
- Location: Station Road, Gloucester; Gloucestershire
- Coordinates: 51.865115°N 2.2409584°W
- Owner: Gloucester City Council
- Operator: Stagecoach West
- Bus routes: All previous services now depart from The Forum, previous services from Clarence Street now depart from Gloucester Transport Hub until late 2027.; 1 – Gloucester to Matson; 2 & 2A – Gloucester to Abbeydale; 3 – Gloucester to Upton St Leonards; 4 – Gloucester to Hempstead; 5 – Gloucester to Saintbridge; 6 – Gloucester to Elmbridge & Longlevens; 7 – Gloucester to Finley Road; 8 – Gloucester to Hunts Grove; 9 – Gloucester to Tuffley; 22 – Gloucester to Coleford via Cinderford & Ruardean; 23 – Gloucester to Coleford via Lydney & Whitecroft; 24 – Gloucester to Coleford via Mitcheldean & Cinderford; 32 – Ross-on-Wye to Gloucester via Newent; 33 – Gloucester to Ross On-Wye for Hereford Transport Hub; 62 – Gloucester to Stonehouse via Stroud; 63 – Gloucester to Forest Green via Stroud; 64 – Gloucester to Stroud; 65 – Gloucester to Dursley for Stroud; 65X – Gloucester to Dursley for Stroud Express(Via A38); 71 – Gloucester to; Northway via Twigworth and Tewkesbury: 94X – Gloucester to Cheltenham -> Direct via Golden Valley A40; 94 – Gloucester to Cheltenham via Churchdown and Park Campus; 95 – Gloucester to Cheltenham via Churchdown, Barfurmlong Lane and Park Campus; 96 – Gloucester to Cheltenham via Churchdown, Chosen Hill School and Park Campus (School Days Only); 97 – Gloucester to Cheltenham; 98 – Gloucester to Cheltenham; 99 – Gloucester to Cheltenham General Hospital via Arle Court & Royal Well Bus Station; 401 - Gloucester to London Victoria via Stroud, Swindon, Reading, Heathrow (National Express); 444 - Gloucester to London Victoria via Cheltenham, Cirencester, Heathrow (National Express); 445 - Hereford to London Victoria via Ross-on-Wye, Newent, Ledbury, Corse, Gloucester, Cheltenham (National Express); 676 – Gloucester to Much Marcle; 781 – Gloucester to Blakeney Via Cinderford – Wednesdays Only; 786 – Gloucester to Parkend Via Lydney – Thursdays Only; 787 – Gloucester to St.Briavels via Bream & Blakeney – Mondays Only; 882 – Gloucester to Cirencester and Tetbury; C71 – Gloucester to Cirencester College – Monday to Friday, College Term Days Only
- Bus stands: 12
- Bus operators: Stagecoach West, National Express, Megabus, Flixbus, Pulhams Coaches, Cheltenham Community Transport/Cheltenham Community Connexions, Newent Shuttle, F R Willetts
- Connections: TRAIN - Gloucester Railway Station (150 metres) BUSES - Clarence Street & Eastgate Street

Construction
- Structure type: Steel frame with Cotswold stone, fronted with glass and external render
- Accessible: Fully accessible

History
- Opened: 27 October 2018 (Rebuild)
Location

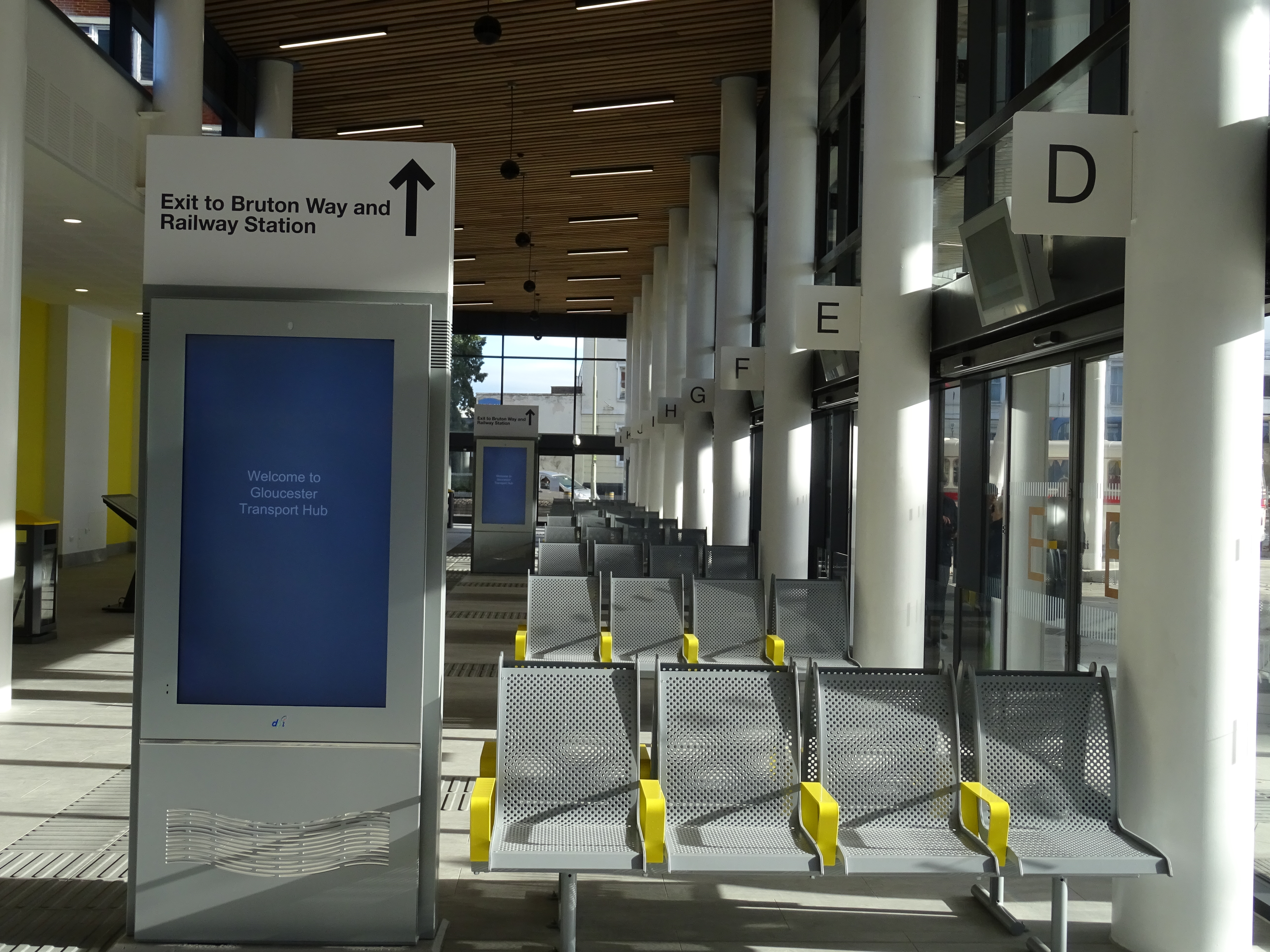
Interior of Gloucester Transport Hub in October 2018

Gloucester Transport Hub (also known as Gloucester Bus Station) is a bus station on Station Road in Gloucester, England.

== History ==
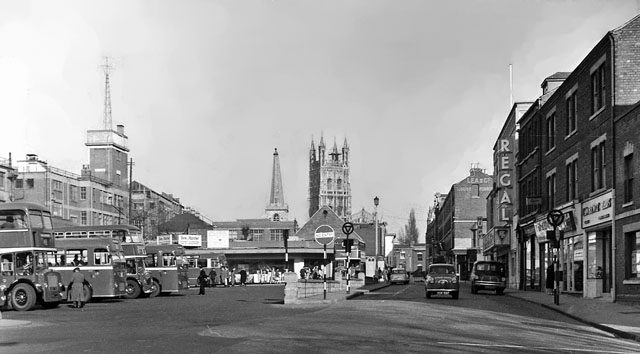
Part of the bus station in Kings Square in 1962

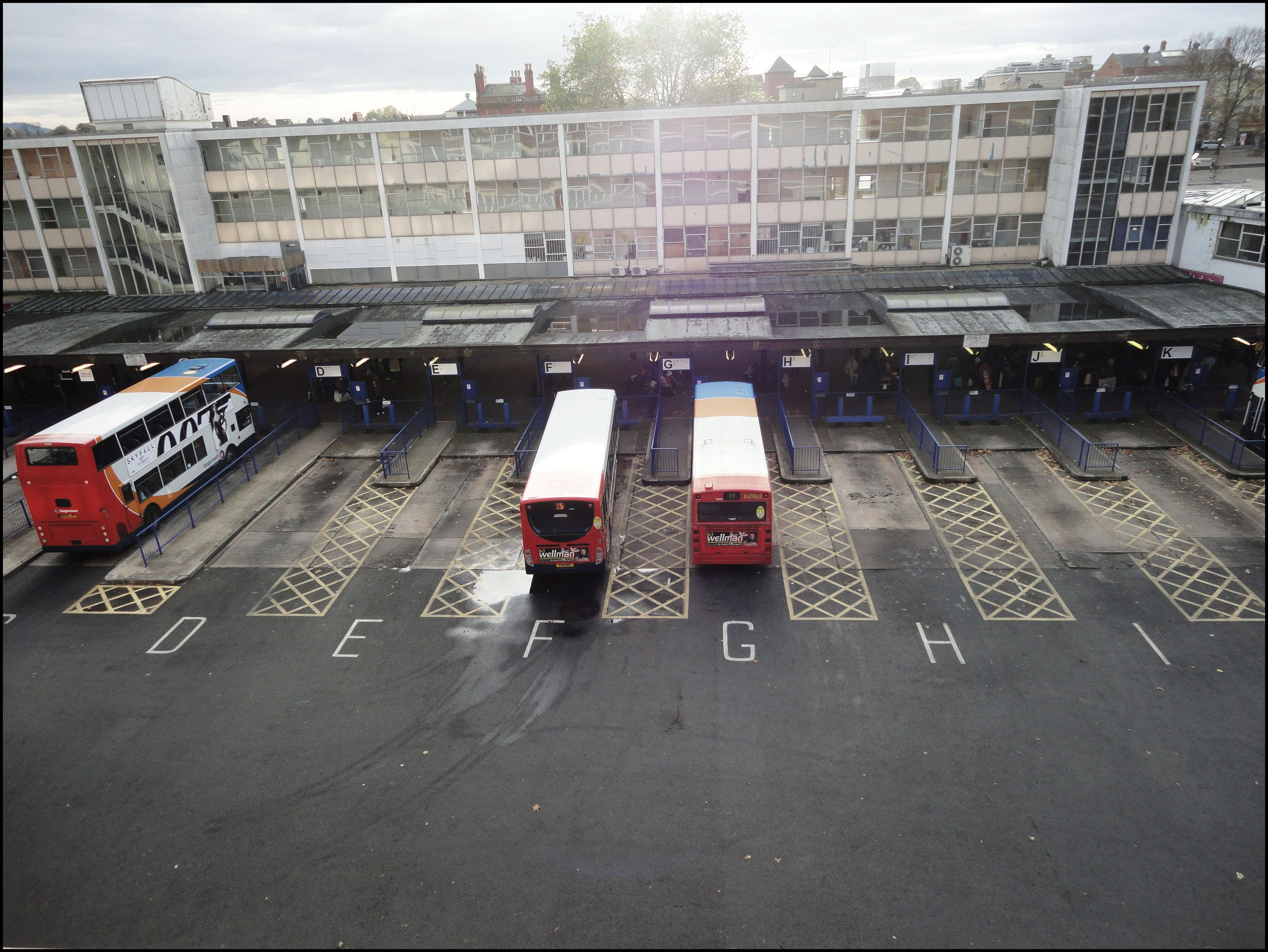
Old Gloucester Bus Station bays in October 2012

Until 1933, the main form of public transport in Gloucester was the tram. In 1935, after the closure of the tramlines. Gloucester City Council partnered with the Bristol Omnibus Company in leasing out its bus services. At this point in time, there was no bus station in the city. However, the old tram depot on London Road was enlarged and used as a bus depot and is today used by Stagecoach West. The original bus station, which had 11 bays, opened in 1962, on the former cattle market site which is now part of Kings Square. This greatly increased the popularity of the shopping area around Northgate Street and Eastgate Street. Also, at this time, a new inner ring road through the city was built, with the first part being Bruton Way, which runs East of the bus station.

In 2012, Gloucester City Council agreed a deal with Stanhope to revamp the Kings Quarter area. This project was planned to cost £60 million with GFirst LEP providing a budget of £3 million to build a new transport hub to replace the old bus station. At this time, an eight week archaeological project took place to investigate the area around the bus station, before any major development work was undertaken. A Roman flood bank was found under the station from this project. In May and June 2016, the old bus station was demolished in preparation for the new one, which now had a budget of £7.5 million with £6.4 million of that coming from the government through GFirst LEP. Part of Grosvenor House was also demolished and several businesses, including the Furniture Recycling Project, had to leave the site.

The original plans for the new transport hub included having a glass front to the northwest side. However, in July 2017 the city council submitted a planning application for a smaller building than originally designed, with the northwest side being external render instead of glass. Additionally, the plans to demolish Bentinck House were put on hold. The proposed reason for these changes was due to a sewer being in an unexpected place and to provide greater flexibility for future development. Along with the building plans, changes to the road layout around Station Road and Bruton Way were made, to make the new transport hub more accessible.

Construction of the new transport hub was started in August 2017 and carried out by Kier Construction, and it opened to the public on 27 October 2018. It has 12 bus bays, a staffed ticket office, electronic timetable displays, a cafe, shop and toilets. It also has solar panels to power the internal lighting

In 2017 it was announced that the stained glass artist Thomas Denny had been commissioned to provide the transport hub with a 14-panel window depicting the story of Gloucester, reportedly at a cost of £100,000. However, in November 2019, it was confirmed that Denny was no longer involved with the project. After long delays, the window was finally installed in 2024. It depicts landmarks such as the cathedral and docks, the Gloster Meteor and Gladiator aircraft, and historic events such as the siege of Gloucester during the English Civil War. However, the design and cost led to a mixed public reception.

== Facilities ==
The bus station was built with a shop and cafe. By 2023, these were both vacant. Both now exist again, the cafe with quite an extensive menu.

== Other Termini ==
Several other local bus services also terminate in adjacent Clarence Street, with another one (12) terminating round the corner from Clarence Street, in Eastgate Street.
