= Dora Billington =

English studio potter (1890–1968)

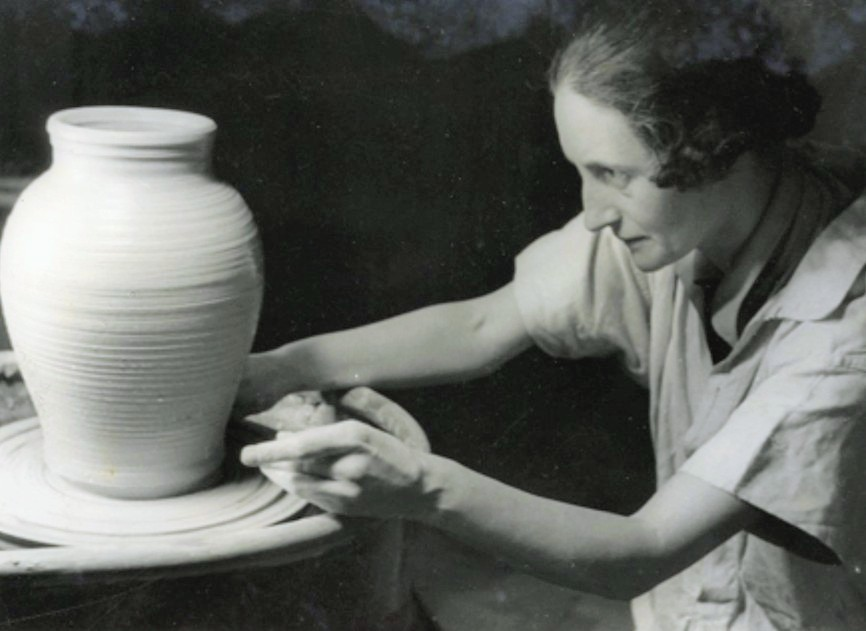
- Billington, c. 1930
- Born: Dora May Billington; 1890; Tunstall, Stoke-on-Trent, England
- Died: 1968 (aged 78)
- Education: Royal College of Art
- Known for: Pottery

Dora May Billington (1890–1968) was an English teacher of pottery, a writer and a studio potter. Her own work explored the possibilities of painting on pottery. As head of the pottery department at the Central School of Arts and Crafts in London (later the Central School of Art and Design), she promoted the idea of clay as an artistic medium with boundless creative potential.

== Life and career ==
Dora Billington was born into a family of potters in Stoke-on-Trent, specifically Tunstall. From 1905 to 1910 she attended Tunstall School of Art and later Hanley School of Art, becoming a teacher assistant in her final year. She worked as a decorator for Bernard Moore, 1910–1912 and then studied at the Royal College of Art (RCA) 1912–1916 and the Slade School of Art. At the RCA she studied in the design department under W. R. Lethaby and was taught calligraphy by Edward Johnston, embroidery by Grace Christie and pottery by Richard Lunn. Billington remained an amateur embroiderer and an occasional writer on textiles. Lunn died in 1915 at the age of about 75 and Billington was asked to take over his class with John Adams (who later ran the Poole Pottery). She taught pottery at the Central School of Arts and Crafts from 1919 and left the RCA in 1925 when William Rothenstein appointed William Staite Murray as pottery instructor. The circumstances of her leaving remain somewhat unclear. By that date Rothenstein had been in place for five years, and although he supported Billington's work he criticised the teaching of pottery and other crafts as "too unexperimental and derivative. No consistent attempt appears to have been made to deal with the interpretation of the contemporary world in design and execution... the research work towards the discovery of new subject matter and new treatment, so noticeable on the Continent, seem to have been wanting."

In 1938 she became head of department at the Central School, assisted by Gilbert Harding Green. Her teaching emphasised the importance of hand building as the first stage of working with clay but all students were expected to learn to throw on the wheel. She had an extensive knowledge of glaze technology and the history of ceramics. Among her students were Quentin Bell, William Newland, Gordon Baldwin, Ruth Duckworth, Alan Caiger-Smith, Margaret Hine, Kenneth Clark, Ann Wynn-Reeves, Katherine Pleydell-Bouverie, Stella Rebecca Crofts, Ursula Mommens, Ray Finch and Valentinos Charalambous. She retired from her post at the Central in 1955 when Gilbert Harding Green became Head of Department.

At the Paris Expo (the International Exposition of Modern Industrial and Decorative Arts) in 1925 Billington was awarded Bronze for her stained glass ‘St Joan’. She also exhibited mosaic. The ceramics courses at the RCA and Central School also received awards. In the 1950s Billington gathered around herself at the Central School of Arts and Crafts a team of teachers who represented an alternative to Bernard Leach’s Eastern aesthetic of utilitarian stoneware vessels glazed in muted colours, and the School became associated with brightly decorated tin-glazed earthenware made by her protégées Alan-Caiger Smith, William Newland, Margaret Hine, Ann Wynn-Reeves and Nicholas Vergette.

She was President of the Arts and Crafts Exhibition Society from 1949 and was involved with the Crafts Centre of Great Britain in London, which was chaired by her colleague John Farleigh, and she selected the ceramics shown there. She was also involved with the Smithsonian touring Exhibition of British Artist Craftsmen in the 1950s.

Her book The Art of the Potter (1937), was the first to relate contemporary craft practice to its historical context and in The Technique of Pottery (1962) she gave a comprehensive account of different methods of working.

Since the 1980s there has been an increased interest in her influence on twentieth century British studio pottery. Jeffrey Jones suggests that she made an impact as head of the pottery department in the Central School by modeling "an extraordinary openness to the potential of clay as an artistic medium in its own right" with "no rules as to what could be made, nor any constraints on ways of making or firing."

== Selected publications ==
- The Art of the Potter, Oxford, OUP, 1937
- The Technique of Pottery, London, Batsford, 1962 ISBN 9780713457674, revised edition 1972
