= Grade I listed buildings in Gloucester =

Gloucestershire shown in England

There are over 9,000 Grade I listed buildings in England. This page is a list of these buildings in the district of Gloucester in Gloucestershire.

== Gloucester ==
Name	Location	Type	Completed (Note: The date given is the date used by Historic England as significant for the initial building or that of an important part in the structure's description.)	Date designated	Grid ref. (Note: Sometimes known as OSGB36, the grid reference is based on the British national grid reference system used by the Ordnance Survey.) Geo-coordinates	Entry number (Note: The "List Entry Number" is a unique number assigned to each listed building and scheduled monument by Historic England.)	Image
Blackfriars Church and Part of East Range of Friary	Gloucester	House	1540–1545	23 January 1952	SO8297518427; 51°51′51″N 2°14′55″W	1245989	Blackfriars Church and Part of East Range of Friary More images
North End of West Range, Blackfriars	11 Blackfriars, Gloucester	House	1540–1545	23 January 1952	SO8294618433; 51°51′51″N 2°14′57″W	1245991	North End of West Range, Blackfriars More images
South Range and adjoining South End of West Range, Blackfriars	Gloucester	House	Later alterations	23 January 1952	SO8294118407; 51°51′50″N 2°14′57″W	1245992	South Range and adjoining South End of West Range, Blackfriars More images
Cathedral Chapter House	Gloucester	Chapter House	c. 1100	23 January 1952	SO8313518814; 51°52′04″N 2°14′47″W	1245953	Cathedral Chapter House More images
Cathedral Church of the Holy and Indivisible Trinity	Gloucester	Abbey	1089–1100	23 January 1952	SO8312118778; 51°52′02″N 2°14′48″W	1245952	Cathedral Church of the Holy and Indivisible Trinity More images
Cathedral Cloister and Lavatorium	Gloucester	Abbey	c. 1360	23 January 1952	SO8310418842; 51°52′04″N 2°14′48″W	1245954	Cathedral Cloister and Lavatorium More images
Cathedral Treasury, Vestry and Library	Gloucester	Abbey	c. 1100	23 January 1952	SO8313318803; 51°52′03″N 2°14′47″W	1245956	Cathedral Treasury, Vestry and Library More images
Church House	Gloucester	Abbey	Early to Mid 12th century	23 January 1952	SO8306318828; 51°52′04″N 2°14′51″W	1245900	Church House More images
Church of St Mary De Crypt	Gloucester	Parish Church	c. 1140	23 January 1952	SO8308118419; 51°51′51″N 2°14′50″W	1245611	Church of St Mary De Crypt More images
Church of St Mary De Lode	Gloucester	Church Hall	1980	23 January 1952	SO8294118910; 51°52′07″N 2°14′57″W	1245668	Church of St Mary De Lode More images
Church of St Nicholas	Gloucester	Church	1993–1994	23 January 1952	SO8290118778; 51°52′02″N 2°14′59″W	1245083	Church of St Nicholas More images
Dick Whittington Tavern	Gloucester	House	Late 19th century	23 January 1952	SO8292418765; 51°52′02″N 2°14′58″W	1245074	Dick Whittington Tavern More images
Greyfriars House and attached Remains of Greyfriars Church	Gloucester	House	Later 18th century	23 January 1952	SO8314118352; 51°51′49″N 2°14′46″W	1245826	Greyfriars House and attached Remains of Greyfriars Church More images
Inner Gate adjoining No 15 College Green	Gloucester	Gatehouse	14th century	23 January 1952	SO8303318855; 51°52′05″N 2°14′52″W	1245899	Inner Gate adjoining No 15 College Green More images
Ladybellegate House	20, Longsmith St, Gloucester	Town House	c. 1704	23 January 1952	SO8300318556; 51°51′55″N 2°14′54″W	1245726	Ladybellegate House More images
Little Cloister	Gloucester Cathedral, Gloucester	Cloister	Early 15th century	23 January 1952	SO8312918860; 51°52′05″N 2°14′47″W	1271578	Little Cloister More images
Little Cloister House	Gloucester Cathedral, Gloucester	House	13th century	23 January 1952	SO8311118865; 51°52′05″N 2°14′48″W	1271579	Little Cloister House More images
Llanthony Priory, Remains of Outer Gatehouse	Gloucester	Augustinian Monastery	1494–1500	23 January 1952	SO8229718025; 51°51′38″N 2°15′30″W	1271694	Llanthony Priory, Remains of Outer Gatehouse More images
Llanthony Priory, Remains of Precinct Wall North of Inner Gatehouse	Gloucester	Precinct Wall	15th century	23 January 1952	SO8234718066; 51°51′39″N 2°15′28″W	1271695	Llanthony Priory, Remains of Precinct Wall North of Inner Gatehouse More images
Llanthony Priory, Remains of Precinct Wall South of Outer Gatehouse	Gloucester	Precinct Wall	Early 16th century	23 January 1952	SO8228117997; 51°51′37″N 2°15′31″W	1271696	Llanthony Priory, Remains of Precinct Wall South of Outer Gatehouse
Llanthony Priory, Remains of Range on South Side of Inner Court	Gloucester	Augustinian Monastery	Early 16th century	23 January 1952	SO8236317952; 51°51′36″N 2°15′27″W	1271697	Llanthony Priory, Remains of Range on South Side of Inner Court More images
Llanthony Priory, Remains of Tythe Barn on North Side of Inner Court	Gloucester	Augustinian Monastery	15th century	23 January 1952	SO8242718046; 51°51′39″N 2°15′24″W	1271698	Llanthony Priory, Remains of Tythe Barn on North Side of Inner Court
New Inn	16–20, Northgate, Gloucester	Inn	Mid 15th century	23 January 1952	SO8321218587; 51°51′56″N 2°14′43″W	1245714	New Inn More images
North Precinct Wall	Gloucester	Abbey wall	12th century	23 January 1952	SO8311218929; 51°52′07″N 2°14′48″W	1271580	North Precinct Wall
Old Judges House	Gloucester	Jettied House	Late 15th century	23 January 1952	SO8311218632; 51°51′58″N 2°14′48″W	1245450	Old Judges House More images
Our Lady's Well (within Field approx. 350m West of St Swithun's Road)	Hempsted, Gloucester	Holy Well	18th century or 19th century	10 January 1955	SO8144717323; 51°51′15″N 2°16′15″W	1271744	Our Lady's Well (within Field approx. 350m West of St Swithun's Road) More images
Passage from Cathedral Cloisters to Former Monastic Infirmary	Gloucester	Cathedral	13th century	23 January 1952	SO8312618846; 51°52′05″N 2°14′47″W	1271582	Passage from Cathedral Cloisters to Former Monastic Infirmary More images
Remains of Monastic Infirmary	Gloucester	Abbey	Early 13th century	23 January 1952	SO8314718865; 51°52′05″N 2°14′46″W	1271583	Remains of Monastic Infirmary More images
Remains of Reservoir, North West Corner of Cathedral Cloister Garth	Gloucester	Reservoir	Early 13th century	23 January 1952	SO8309118835; 51°52′04″N 2°14′49″W	1245955	Remains of Reservoir, North West Corner of Cathedral Cloister Garth
St Marys Gate adjoining No 14 College Green	Gloucester	Gate	Late 12th century	23 January 1952	SO8300818865; 51°52′05″N 2°14′53″W	1245897	St Marys Gate adjoining No 14 College Green More images
St Michaels Gate	Gloucester	Gate	14th century	23 January 1952	SO8309318698; 51°52′00″N 2°14′49″W	1245905	St Michaels Gate More images
St Oswalds Priory	Gloucester	Church	c900	23 January 1952	SO8304019007; 51°52′10″N 2°14′52″W	1245658	St Oswalds Priory More images
The Fleece Hotel	Gloucester	Inn	15th century	23 January 1952	SO8309518588; 51°51′56″N 2°14′49″W	1245447	The Fleece Hotel More images
9 and 9A, Southgate Street (Costa Coffee)	Gloucester	House	1665	23 January 1952	SO8314818515; 51°51′54″N 2°14′46″W	1271748	9 and 9A, Southgate Street (Costa Coffee) More images
