= Gloucester Friary =

Gloucester Friary may refer to:

- Blackfriars, Gloucester (Dominican)
- Greyfriars, Gloucester (Franciscan)
- Whitefriars, Gloucester (Carmelite)
