= Our Lady's Well, Hempsted =

Our Lady's Well
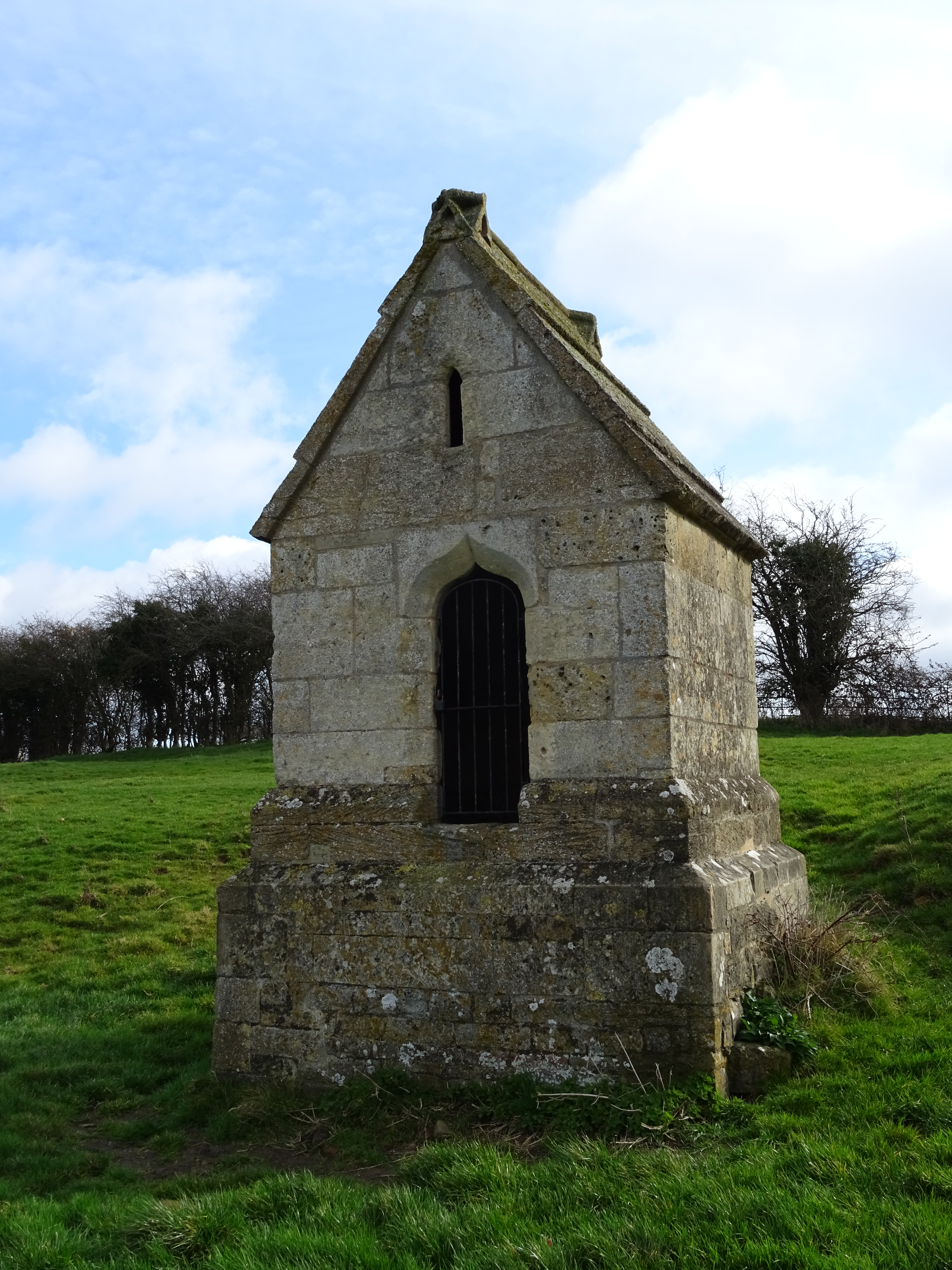
- Interactive map of Our Lady's Well
- 51.854185°N 2.270776°W
- Type: Holy Well
- Location: Hempsted, Gloucester

History
- Built: 14th century

Listed Building – Grade I
- Designated: 10 January 1955
- Reference no.: 1271744

Scheduled monument
- Official name: Lady's Well
- Reference no.: 1002073

Our Lady's Well (also known as Saint Anne's Well) is a holy well house in Hempsted, Gloucester. It was designated as a Grade I listed building in January 1955.

== History ==
The well house was built in the 14th century for the Manor of Hempsted, which was held by Llanthony Secunda. The well house is a tall structure built from Limestone blocks with an arched opening at the front. Water issues from the front into a large stone trough. The rectangular water trough was added in the 18th or 19th century, and would have provided water for livestock. On the back of the well is a stone sculpture showing Saint Anne standing between her daughter, the virgin Mary, and an Angel. It has been used as a baptistery, and formerly was considered to have medicinal properties. In the past it has been a place for pilgrimage, with countless pilgrims being recorded as coming to the site to seek cures. Pilgrimage was revived in 1989 for several years but has now ceased. The well is now dry. Ancient earthworks exists just to the east of the field containing the well.

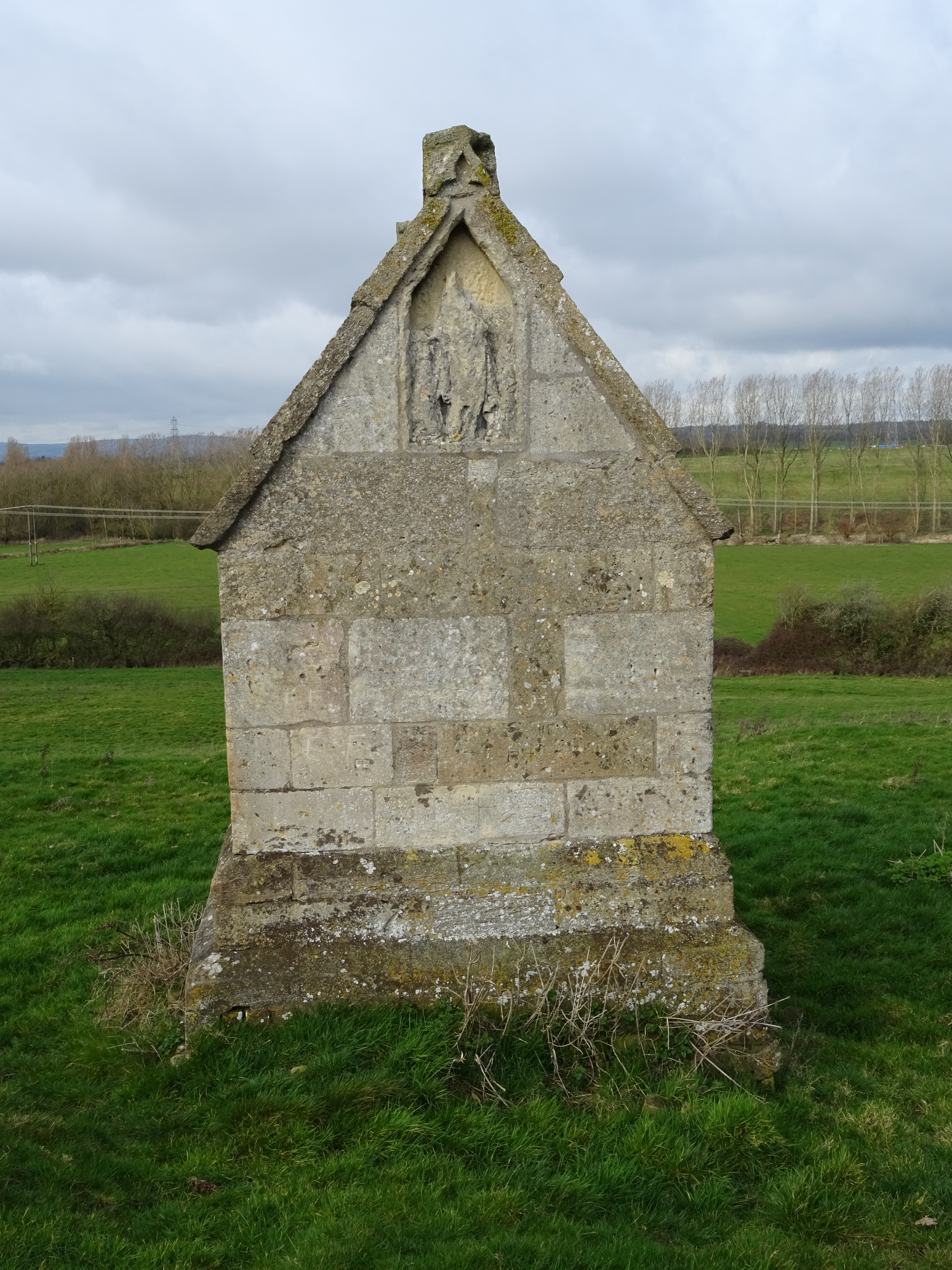
The back of the Well showing the stone sculpture of Saint Anne

== Architecture ==
The well house is built of limestone ashlar blocks with a gabled roof of dressed limestone slabs. It is a small square building with an entrance on the west-side, which used to be closed by an iron door. There is a rectangular water trough, also on the west side extending to the north, which is made of dressed stone kerb walls. The north and south walls are plain, but in the gable of the east wall is a worn sculpted structure of three figures. Inside there is a single square chamber with a water inlet at low level.
