= The New Inn, Gloucester =

Grade I listed pub in Gloucester, England

Coordinates: 51.8654°N 2.2450°W

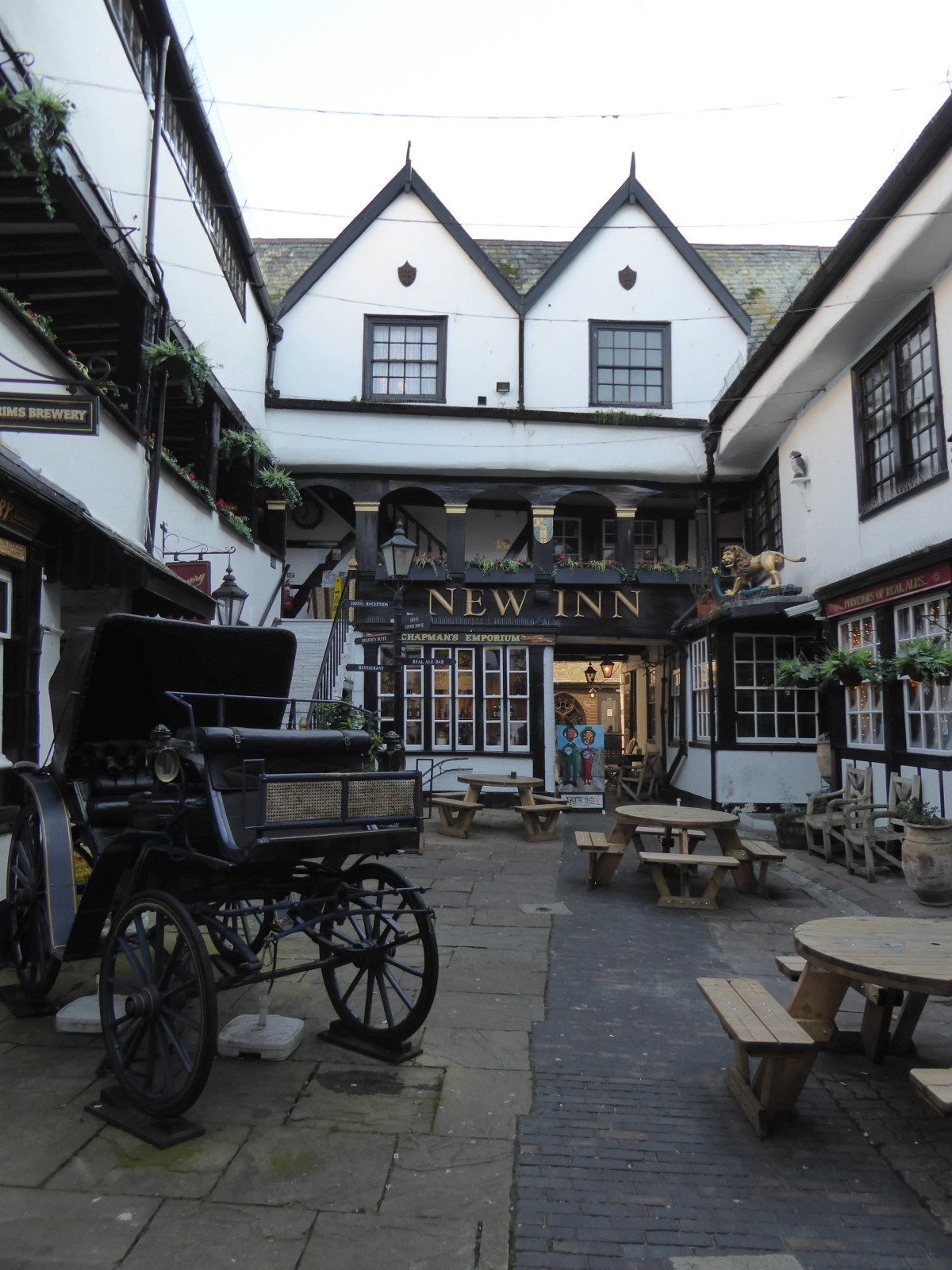
The courtyard of the New Inn (2016)

The New Inn, 16 Northgate Street, Gloucester, England, is a timber framed building used as a public house, hotel and restaurant. It is the most complete surviving example of a medieval courtyard inn with galleries in Britain, and is a Grade I listed building. The announcement of Lady Jane Grey's succession to the English throne was made from the Inn gallery in 1553.

== History ==
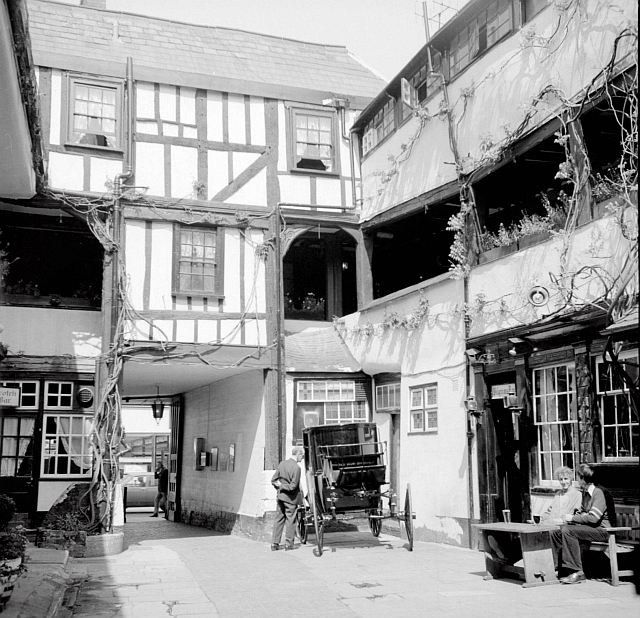
The New Inn looking from the courtyard out (1973)

The Inn was built in 1450 by John Twyning, a monk, as a hostelry for the former Benedictine Abbey of St Peter. It is on the site of an earlier inn. After the dissolution of St Peter's the inn passed to the Dean and Chapter of Gloucester Cathedral and was leased to various inn holders until it was sold in 1858. Stories that the inn was built to provide lodgings for pilgrims to the tomb of King Edward II were first recorded in the eighteenth century and may be incorrect.

In 1553, King Edward VI died and Lady Jane Grey was proclaimed Queen from the first floor gallery by the Abbot of Gloucester.

It is thought that William Shakespeare may have performed at the Inn with his company The Lord Chamberlain's Men as it is known that the company did visit and perform in the city. Inns were often used for theatrical performances in England (Inn-yard theatre) and Spain (Corral de comedias).

At 1am on the 7 May 2018, a fire had started at the rear of the Inn which spread to several bedrooms on the second floor, the roof and the bar area and had expanded by 5.50am. Soon afterwards twelve fire engines throughout Gloucestershire had arrived to save the building with Police and Ambulances, It is believed nobody was injured in it.

== Architecture ==
The timber frame of the large three-storey rectangular building is of oak with lathe and plaster rendered panels. Open jettied galleries look over the courtyard and form the entry to chambers on the upper floors. The west front in Northgate street forms seven bays, some of which are now used as separate shops, was altered in 1924.

The Inn is entered through a carriage way from Northgate Street, and is the most complete surviving example of a medieval courtyard inn with galleries in Britain.

Close to the entrance to the Inn in Northgate Street lies New Inn Lane, which runs parallel to Eastgate Street and The Oxbode. Reportedly, it was originally called Pilgrims Lane.

== Today ==
Today the Inn is a restaurant, pub and 36 bedroomed hotel. There is also a coffee shop and two function rooms.

== Haunted ==
The Inn is supposedly haunted with one unexplained event captured on CCTV in 2010.
