= Whitefriars, Gloucester =

Friary in Gloucester, England

Coordinates: 51.865524°N 2.239784°W

Arms of the Carmelite order.

Whitefriars, also known as the White Friars or The College of Carmelites, Gloucester, England, was a Carmelite friary of which nothing now survives.

== History ==
The Friary was outside the north gate of the city and was founded around 1268 or 1269, probably by Queen Eleanor, Sir Thomas Gifford (or Giffard), and Sir Thomas Berkeley. By 1337 there were 31 friars resident.

The Friary produced some important men, including Nicholas Cantelow (Cantelupe of Gloucester) and David Bois, but by the time of the dissolution of the monasteries the Friary had declined, having only three friars remaining. According to Fosbrooke, much of the Friary was destroyed about 1567, while materials from the buildings were used to fortify Gloucester during the English Civil War. The founder's lodgings were converted to a barn during the war. During the reign of Elizabeth I, parts of the Friary had been used as the county House of Correction. The site became known as Friars' Ground.

In October 2020, part of the friary was found by archaeologists after Bruton Way multi-storey car park was demolished in 2019 as part of the Kings Quarter development.

== See also ==
- Blackfriars, Gloucester
- Greyfriars, Gloucester
