= Fleece Hotel =

Historic hotel in Gloucester, United Kingdom

Coordinates: 51.8658°N 2.2469°W

The Fleece Hotel
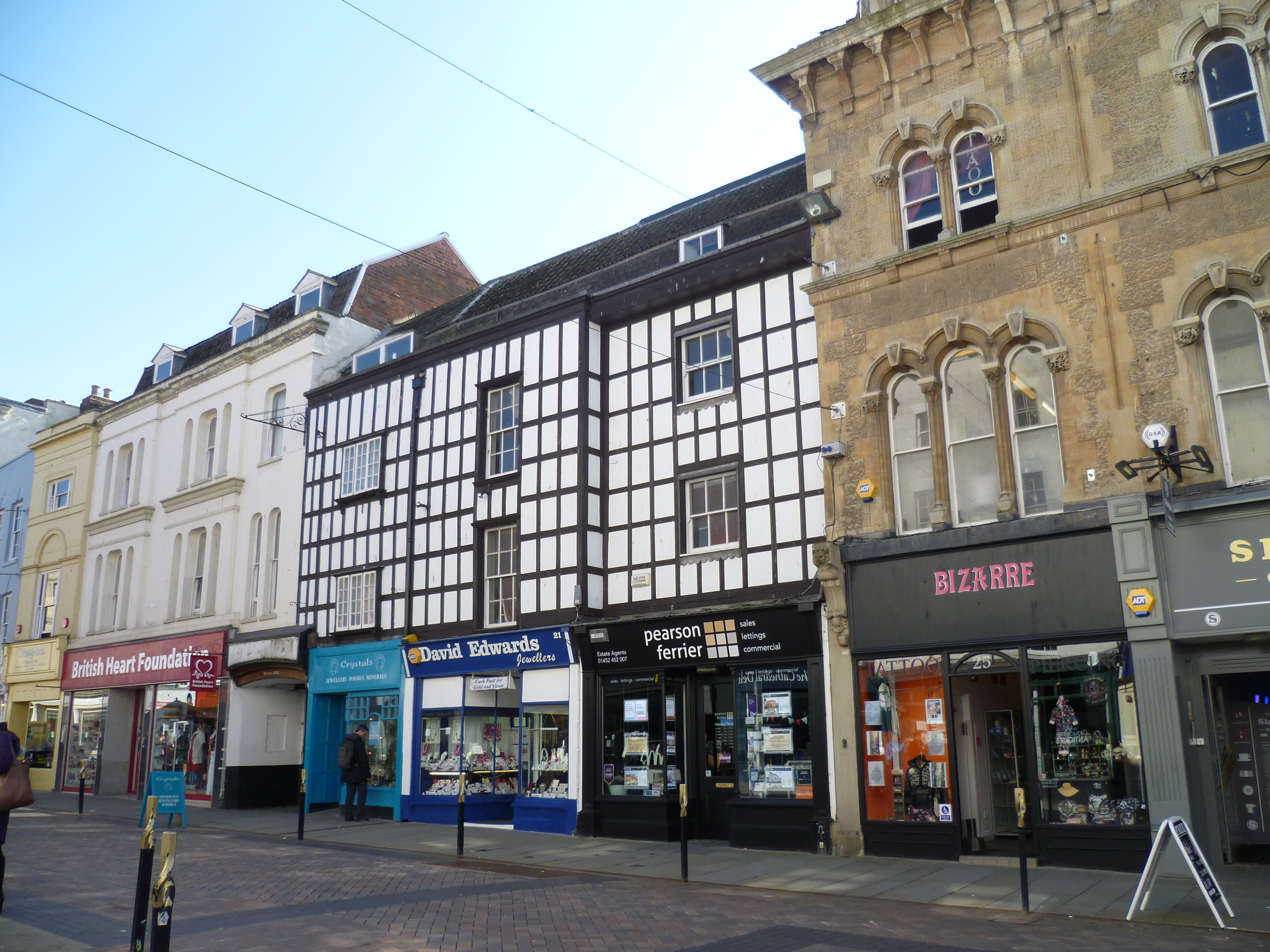
- The Fleece Hotel (centre)
- Interactive map of the The Fleece Hotel area
- Former names: Golden Fleece Inn

General information
- Type: Hotel
- Location: 19 Westgate Street, Gloucester, United Kingdom
- Completed: 1497
- Renovated: 2014

The Fleece Hotel, located on Westgate Street, Gloucester is a timber framed building dating from the 15th century, which incorporated a 12th-century stone undercroft. The building is part grade I and part grade II listed with Historic England.

== History ==
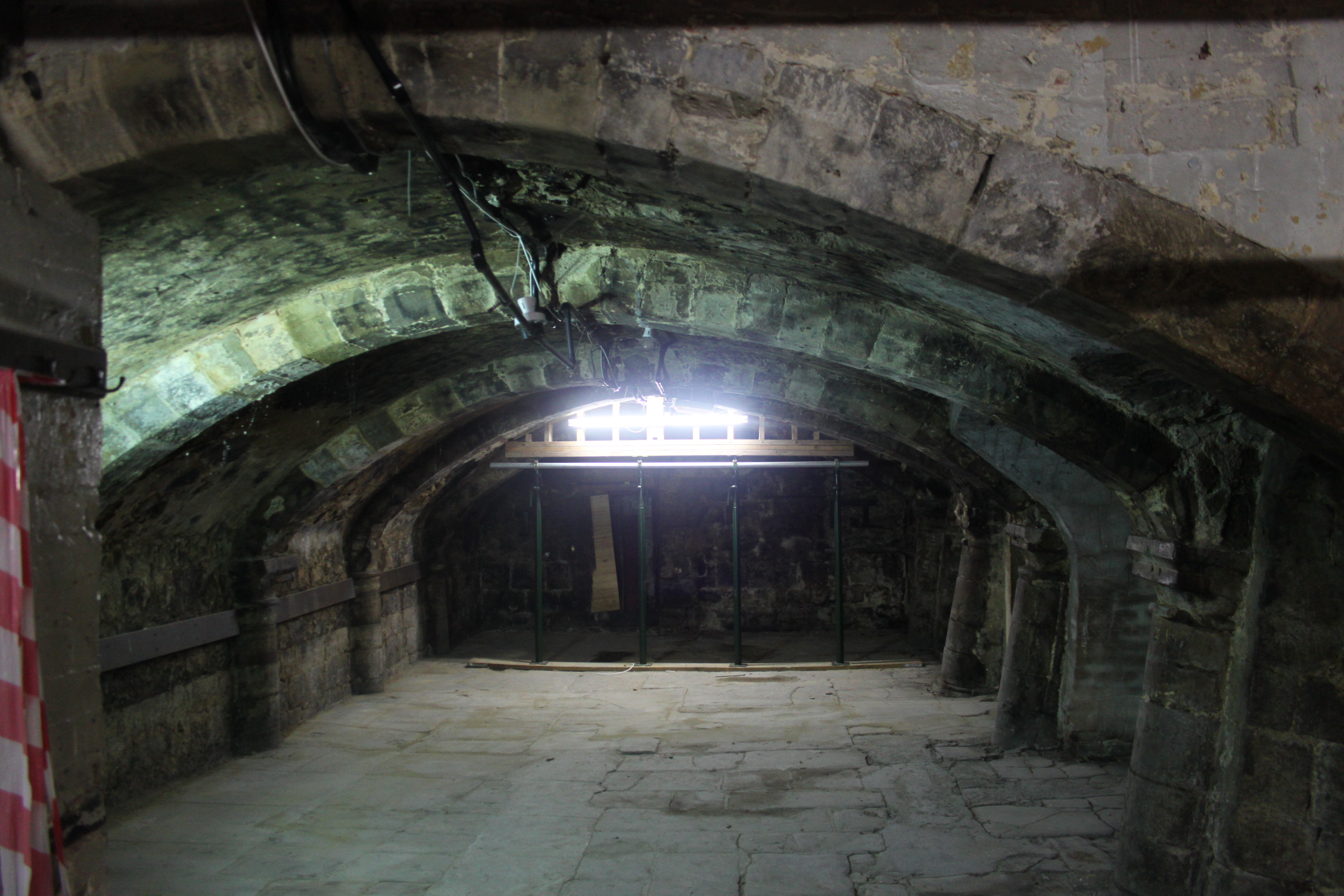
The 12th century undercroft of the Hotel

The Fleece Hotel was first opened in 1497 as one of the three major inns of Gloucester to house pilgrims visiting the tomb of Edward II of England. The 12th century undercroft, known as the "Monk's Retreat" was originally part of a merchant's house, and was incorporated into the structure. By 1455, it was a property owned by Gloucester Abbey, and was developed into an inn by the Abbey during the 16th century. It was first recorded as the Golden Fleece Inn in 1673. The building was made part Grade I listed on 24 January 1952, with other parts of the building made Grade II listed on 15 December 1998.

After the building was left empty for around nine years, the hotel was purchased by Gloucester City Council in 2011. Later that year, the council announced a £350,000 restoration scheme, with the leader of the city council, Paul James, saying "We want to restore it to bring it back into use and we want to do that as quickly as possible." They subsequently undertook waterproofing work in both the salt loft and the kitchen block, with further repair works and partial demolition afterwards. Two years later, plans were revealed for the building to be run as a backpacker's hostel by the YMCA, and with the undercroft operated as a cafe/bar.

On 20 July 2017, the building suffered an arson attack which caused extensive damage, particularly to the roof, which made it unusable until repair work could be carried out.

On 17 September 2019, Gloucester City Council announced that the site would be redeveloped into a boutique hotel in partnership with Dowdeswell Estates Before any firm plans were agreed however, Dowdeswell Estates Limited ceased trading (not related to this project) and the scheme was therefore abandoned. Since then a number of potential partners and possible schemes have been proposed but none have so far progressed to the stage of an agreed proposal.

An extensive programme of stripping out to expose the structure, to facilitate building recording, was carried out in association with Historic England and a detailed report was published in 2023. The property is currently being maintained on an essential repairs only basis by the owners (Gloucester City Council) pending decisions regarding the long term future of this important site.

== Government Funding Reallocation (2023) ==
In January 2023, it was revealed that the initial £6.3 million of government funding allocated for The Fleece Hotel's redevelopment was reallocated to the University of Gloucestershire City Centre Campus and The Forge, part of The Forum project. The leader of the city council, Councillor Hilton stated that this reallocation prevented the continuation of The Fleece’s redevelopment project. However, he also highlighted that there was a risk the City Council would have lost the funding altogether if it had not been spent by a specific deadline.
