= Hempsted =

Village in Gloucestershire, England

Coordinates: 51°51′N 2°16′W

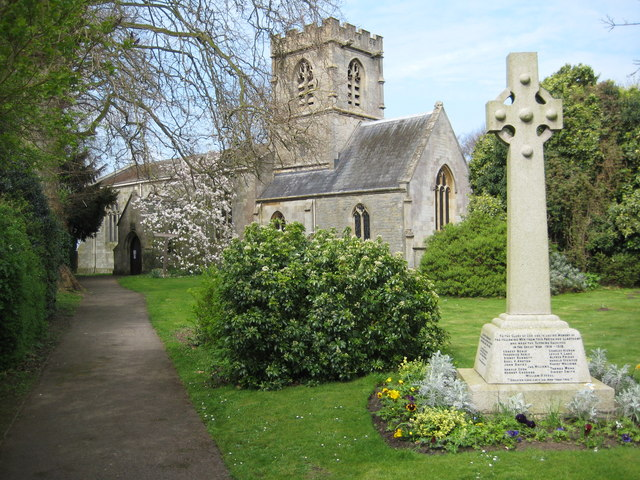
- The church and war memorial

- Location within Gloucestershire
- District: Gloucester
- Shire county: Gloucestershire
- Region: South West
- Country: England
- Sovereign state: United Kingdom
- Post town: GLOUCESTER
- Postcode district: GL2
- Dialling code: 01452
- UK Parliament: Gloucester

Hempsted is a suburban village on the edge of Gloucester, in Gloucestershire, England. The parish was abolished in 1966 and absorbed into the parish and city of Gloucester. The current estimated population based on small area data of the 2021 ONS census is 2715.

== History ==
An ancient area of Gloucester, Hempsted was just outside the city. The fine Norman church of St. Swithun was built and paid for by Norman noblemen. The churchyard contains the chest tomb of John Freeman, a Royalist officer, shot at the siege of Gloucester in 1643. During the Middle Ages a persecuted Augustinian monastic order came out of Wales and settled at Hempsted with the blessing of the City authorities. They founded Llanthony Secunda Priory and Hempsted became an estate of the priory. The church was extended with a new vestry and a west gallery was added as well as new pews and re-roofing to the design of G.V.Maddox of Monmouth in 1839. Maddox died at the rectory in Hempsted on 27 February 1864.

In 1961 the civil parish had a population of 508. On 1 April 1966 the parish was abolished to become part of Gloucester, except small parts of the former parish which went instead to neighbouring Highnam and Minsterworth.

== Transport ==
Some areas of the village are connected to Gloucester and Alney Island, as well as Quedgeley by Segregated Bicycle Path.

== Sport ==
From 1986 until 2007, Hempsted was home to Gloucester City A.F.C. at their Meadow Park Ground. The club were forced to leave by the 2007 United Kingdom floods before a return home in 2020 to a new Meadow Park stadium. Gordon League Rugby Club bought an area of land in 1932 and have been based in Hempsted since then. Gloucester Rowing Club is also based in Hempsted, on the Gloucester and Sharpness Canal.

== See also ==
- Hempsted Court
- Our Lady's Well, Hempsted
