= Old Judges House =

Former judges lodgings in Gloucester, England

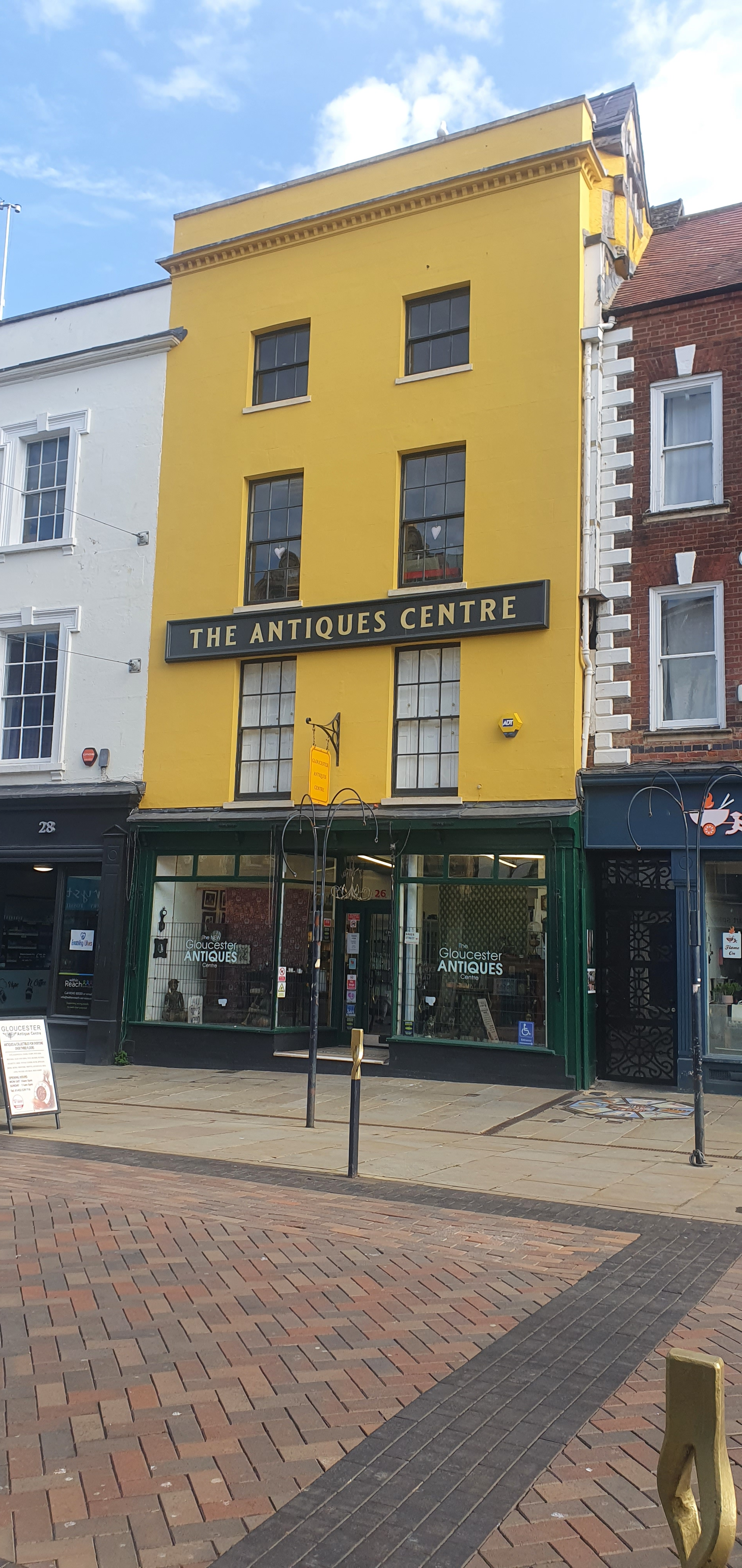
- "the finest and largest urban timber framed building in Britain"

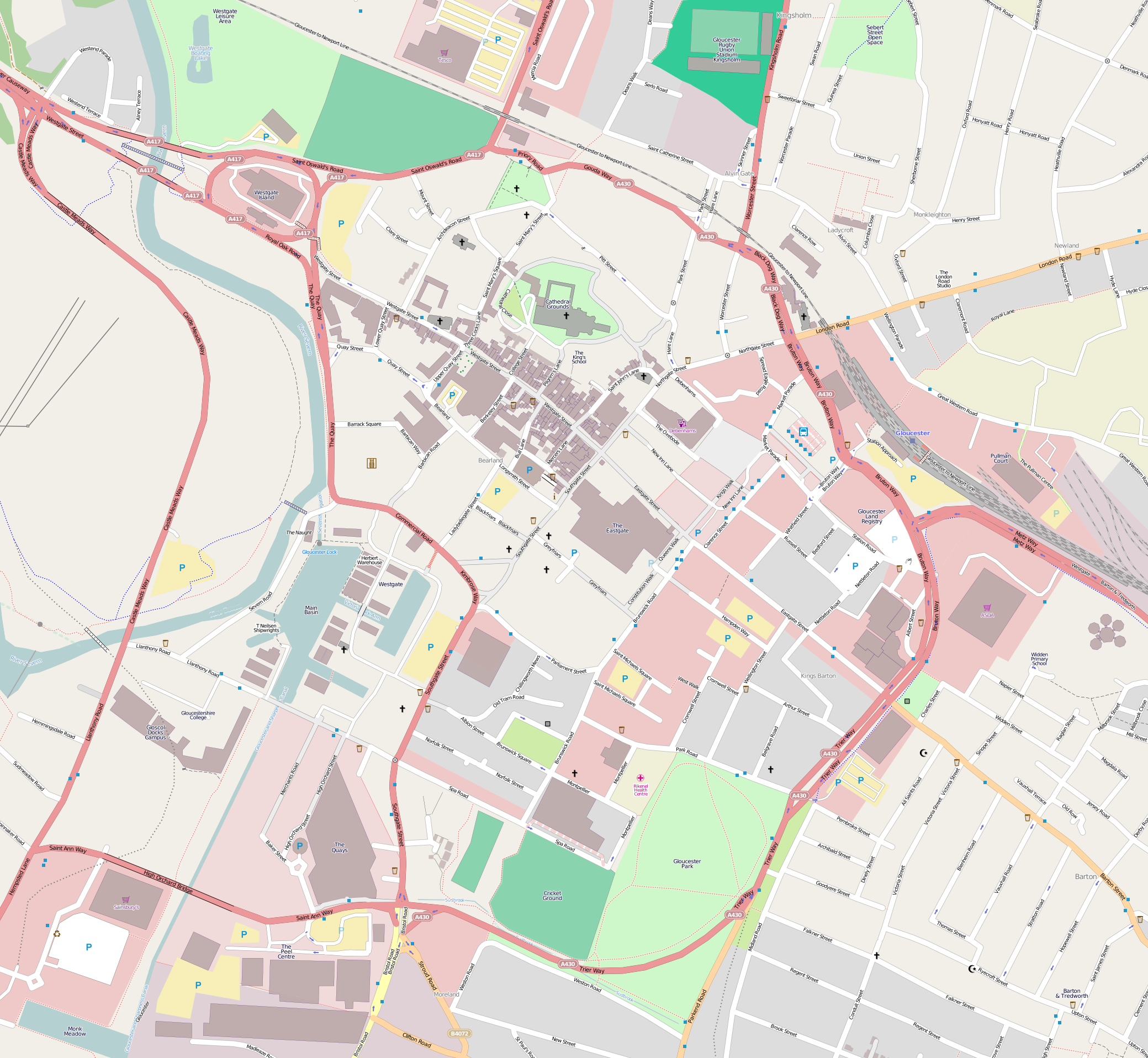
- Location within Gloucester Central
- 51.866°N 2.2467°W
- Type: Former judges' lodgings, now commercial
- Location: Westgate Street, Gloucester

History
- Built: 15th century, later additions

Site notes
- Architectural style: Tudor
- Owner: Privately owned

Listed Building – Grade I
- Official name: Old Judges House
- Designated: 23 January 1952
- Reference no.: 1245450

The Old Judges House, 26 Westgate Street, is a former judges' lodgings building in Gloucester, England. It dates from the late 15th century when it was built as a house and shop. Extended and altered in each subsequent century, in the 19th it was the headquarters and shop for the Winfields seed company. In the 20th and 21st centuries it has housed a bookshop and is currently occupied by Gloucester Antiques Centre. It is a Grade I listed building.

== History ==
Westgate Street runs south-east to north-west through the city, to the south of the cathedral. It is "by far the longest and most important street of medieval Gloucester". The Old Judges House stands at No. 26, with a narrow passageway, Maverdine Lane, to the right. David Verey and Alan Brooks, in their Gloucestershire 2 volume in the Pevsner Buildings of England series, revised and re-issued in 2002, describe it as "the most magnificent 16/17th timber-framed merchant's house remaining" in the city. The building dates from the late-15th century when it was built as a combined shop and house. It was much enlarged and embellished in the late-16th/early-17th centuries. In the 18th, the façade onto Westgate street was refaced in stone. (Note: The architect John Chessell Buckler drew the original street frontage prior to its re-facing.) In the early 19th century it was used as lodgings for judges on the Western Assize circuit. The quality of the building's accommodation generated some criticism; one judge referred to it as a "badly drained, ill-ventilated, foetid dog-hole". In 1888 the building became the headquarters and shop of the Winfields seed company which undertook further alterations. In the later 20th and 21st centuries, the building was used firstly as a bookshop and, since 2016, as an antiques centre.

== Architecture and description ==
The street frontage is of four-storeys, faced with stone, and rendered. The Tudor frontage is of three-storeys with three bays, and has been tree-ring dated to 1586-1587. Verey and Brooks describe the close studding decoration as "astonishingly rich". The interior contains much original detail, including "rare, original patterned leaded glass". The Old Judges House is a Grade I listed building.

== Gallery ==
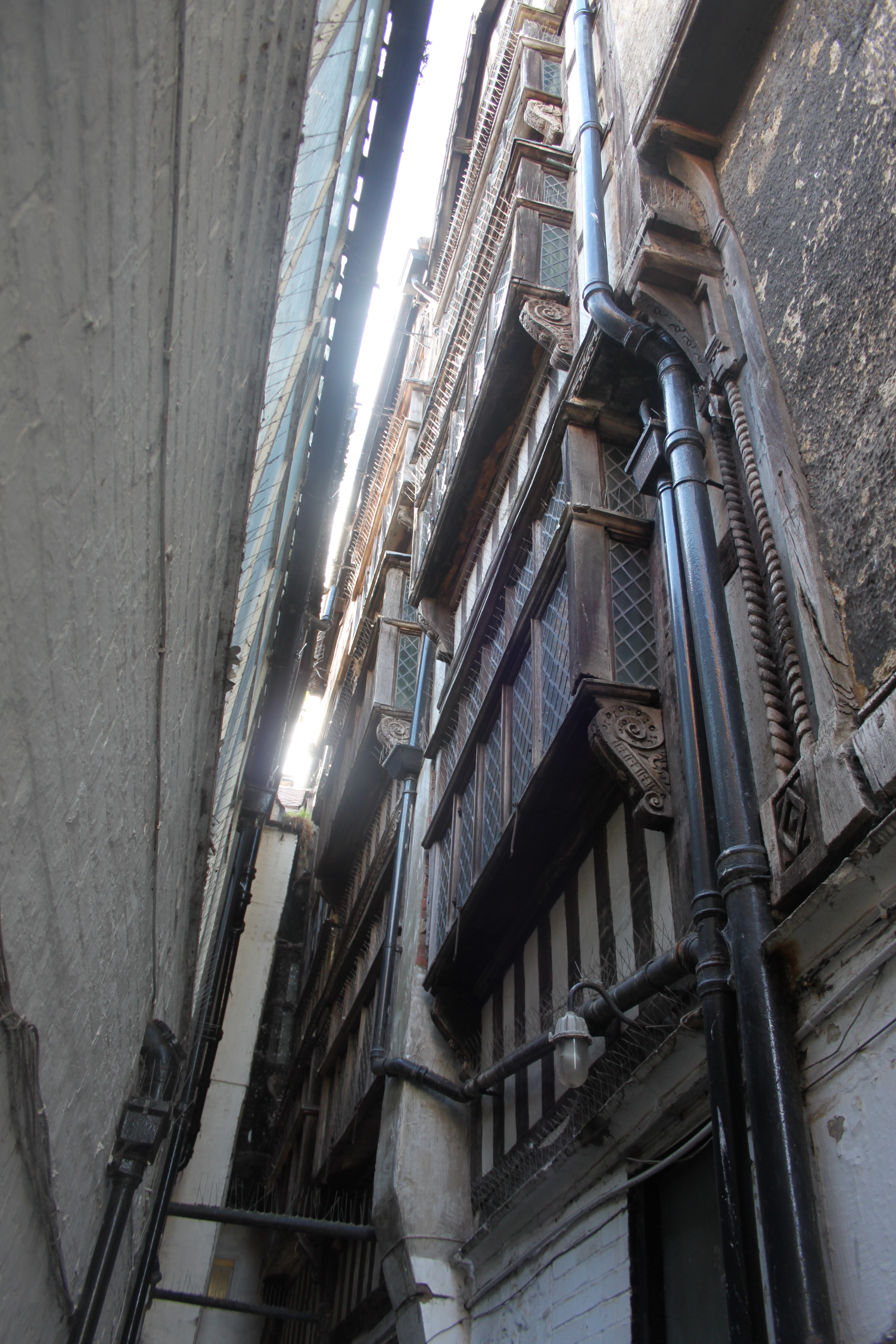
The Tudor frontage visible from Maverdine Lane

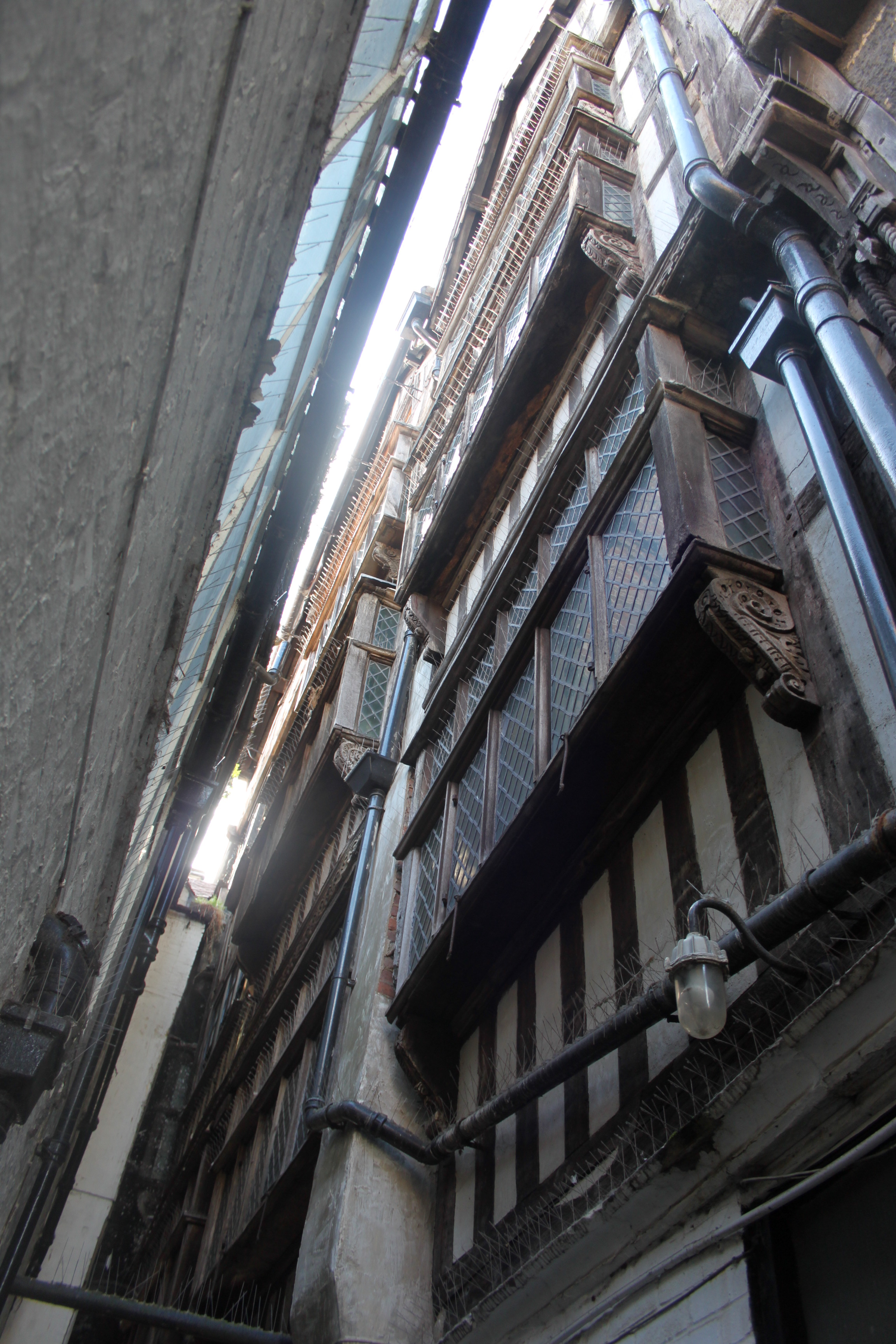
Another view

== Sources ==
- Verey, David; Brooks, Alan (2002) [1970]. Gloucestershire 2: The Vale and the Forest of Dean. The Buildings of England. New Haven, US and London: Yale University Press. ISBN 978-0-300-09733-7. OCLC 249275468.
