= Dick Whittington Tavern =

Grade I listed pub in Gloucester, England

Coordinates: 51°52′02″N 2°14′58″W

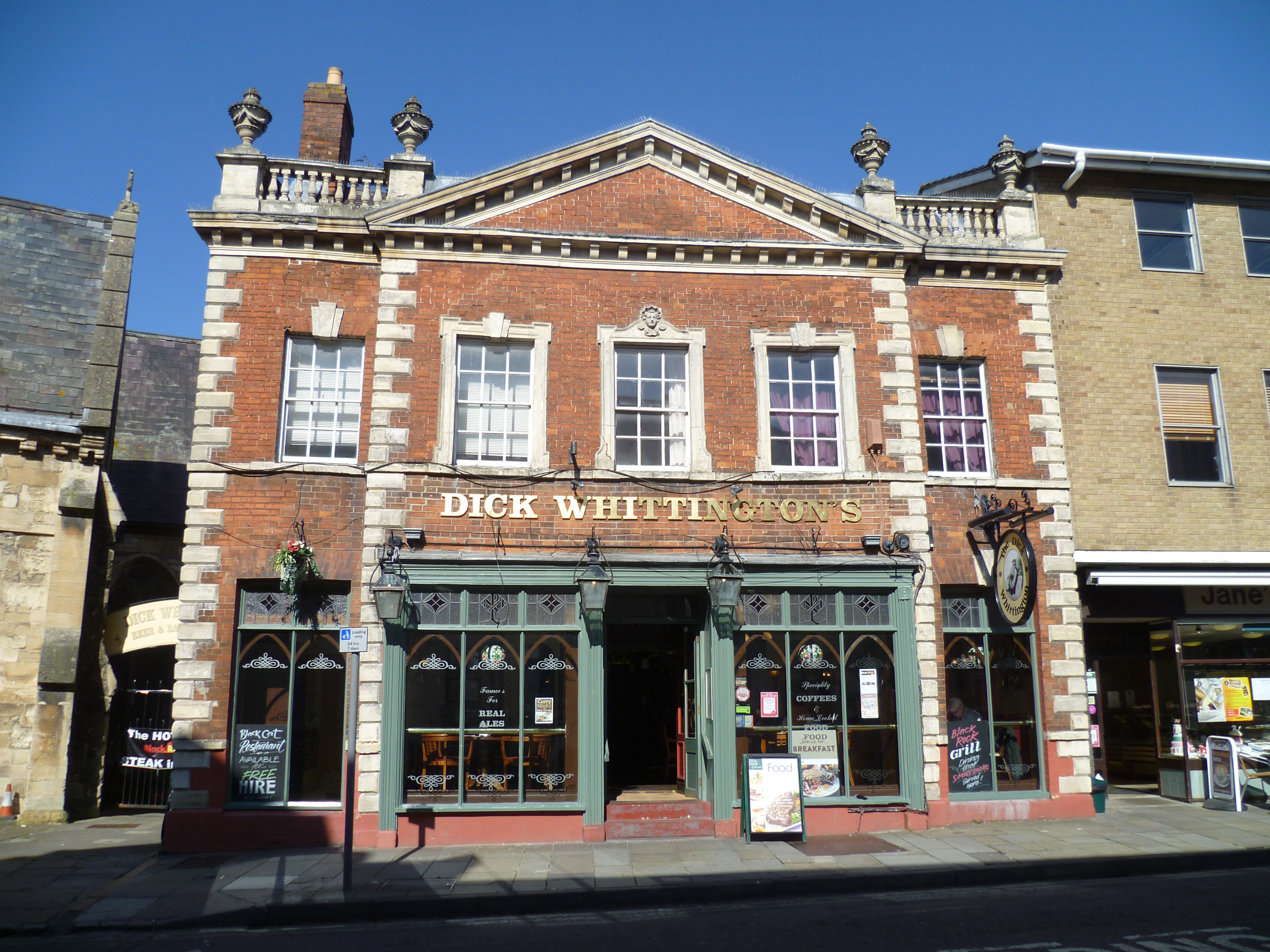
The Dick Whittington Tavern

The Dick Whittington Tavern, currently named Dick Whittington's, is a public house at 100 Westgate Street, Gloucester, built in the 15th century and known as Saint Nicholas House, possibly for the family of Richard Whittington (Dick Whittington), Lord Mayor of London. The building is grade I listed with Historic England.

After multiple refurbishments, including adding a Georgian town house frontage in the 18th century, conversion to a shop in the 19th century, it finally became a public house in 1980.

== History ==
The building, known originally as Saint Nicholas House, was erected in the 1480s, possibly for the family of the Lord Mayor of London, Richard Whittington, with whom it is associated. It had alterations during the 15th and 16th centuries, and in 1574, Queen Elizabeth I visited the building. By the 1700s the building was converted into a Georgian-styled town house. In the 19th century, it was re-purposed into a shop. The building was designated a Grade I listed building on 23 January 1952. In 1980, the building was restored by the Gloucester Historic Buildings Ltd (now the Gloucester Civic Trust) and changed the use to a public house. Behind the St Nicholas Church next door, there is a large beer garden. In 2018, the Dick Whittington was sold by Dominion Hospitality to Four County Inns, who refurbished the venue in 2019.

== Building ==
The building is based on a timber frame, with a brick frontage and stone dressings. The roof is made of slate, with brick chimney stacks. The rear of the building still shows the timber basis. It is two storeys high, with an additional attic space and basement.
