= Greyfriars, Gloucester =

Monastery in Gloucester, England

Coordinates: 51.86359°N 2.246264°W

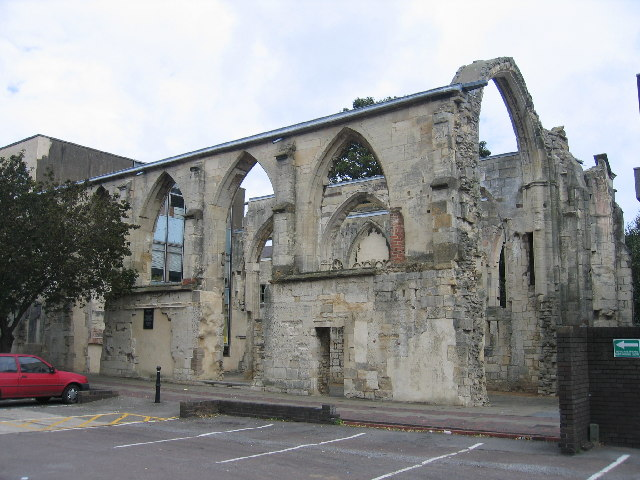
Remains of the 16th century friary church.

Greyfriars, Gloucester, England, was a medieval monastic house founded about 1231.

In about 1518 a prominent local family, the Berkeleys of Berkeley Castle, paid for the church to be rebuilt in Perpendicular Gothic style. The rest of the friary complex was later demolished.

== See also ==
- Blackfriars, Gloucester
- Whitefriars, Gloucester
