= John Giles (architect) =

British architect

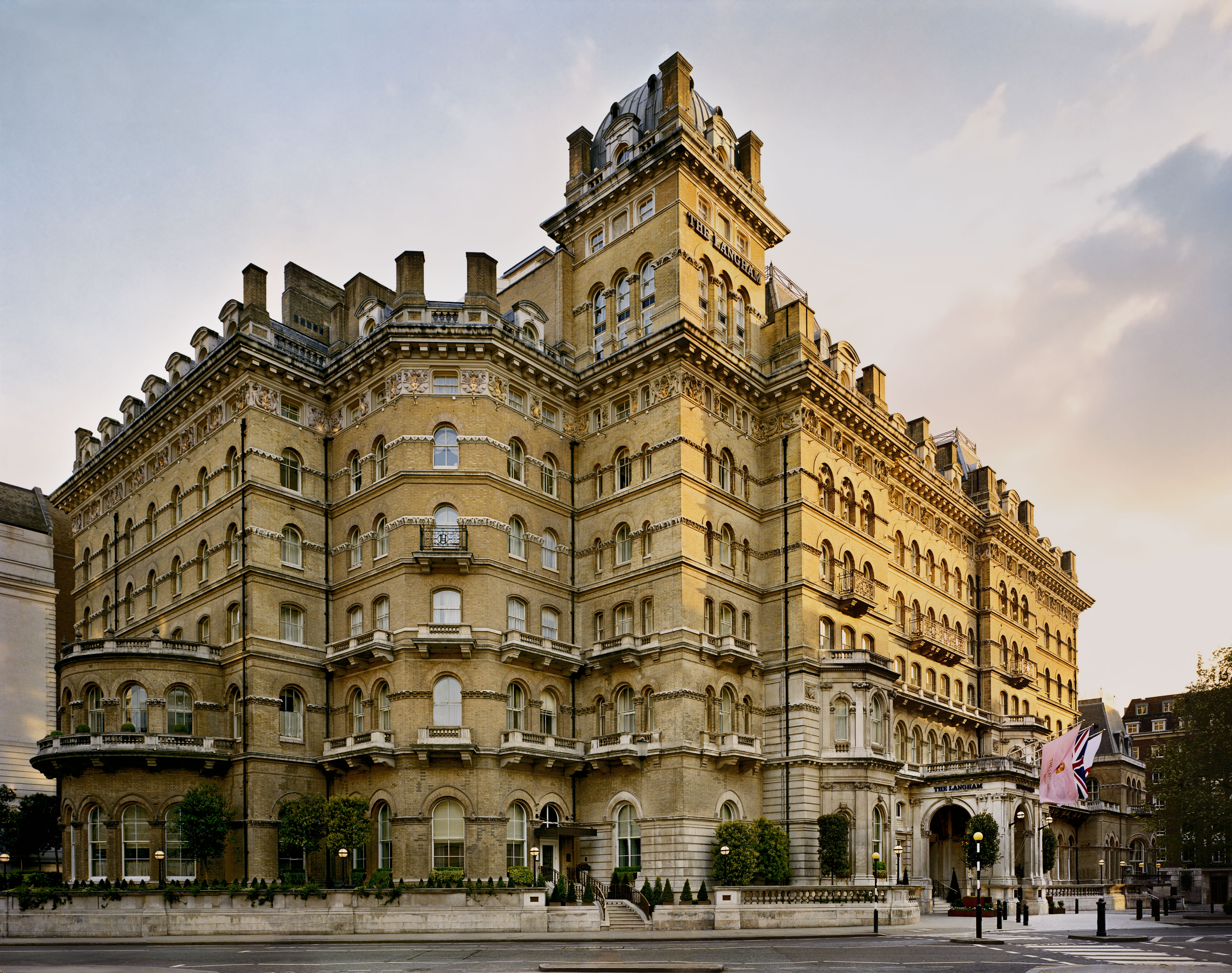
- Langham Hotel (1865)
- Born: ?1830; Lincoln
- Died: 20 February 1900; 42, Bedford Square, London.
- Occupation: Architect
- Practice: John Giles & Gough; Giles, Gough & Trollope
- Buildings: St Augustine's Hospital, Chartham; Langham Hotel, London; Christ Church, Gipsy Hill

John Giles was a British architect. He was born in Lincoln, probably in 1830, and his family came from Branston near Lincoln. He was articled to the Lincoln architect Pearson Bellamy. He had moved to London by 1859 and with Pearson Bellamy entered a number competitions for major public buildings. Of these only one, for Grimsby Town, was successful. In London he was responsible for a number of major projects including the Langham Hotel. He also started in 1869 on the design of hospitals with the Infirmary to Hampstead Union Workhouse. After a short period of partnership with Lewis Angel, when Stratford Town Hall was built and with Edward Biven, by 1873 he was in partnership with Albert Edward Gough. They were joined in the practice by J E Trollope and they became involved in the design of Arts and Crafts housing in London's west end. Giles had business interests in the City of London and was noted in 1867 as being a Director of the Imperial Guardian Life Insurance Company.

== Works ==
Giles initially worked with Bellamy and Hardy of Lincoln. In 1859 they submitted plans in a competition for the Manchester Assize Courts in Great Ducie St. Manchester, but the competition was won by Sir Alfred Waterhouse with a notable building in the Venetian Gothic style. Giles and Bellamy and Hardy's proposed building was in the Palazzo revival style. Then in 1861 they were successful in a competition to design Grimsby Town Hall. Giles' practice was first at 2 Verulam Buildings, London in 1864 and he was to move to 28 Craven Street, Charing Cross by 1868. A notable architect articled to Giles was Charles Bell who came from Grantham in Lincolnshire. Following this Giles was working by himself and his most notable buildings were:

- Langham Hotel, London, built between 1863 and 1865

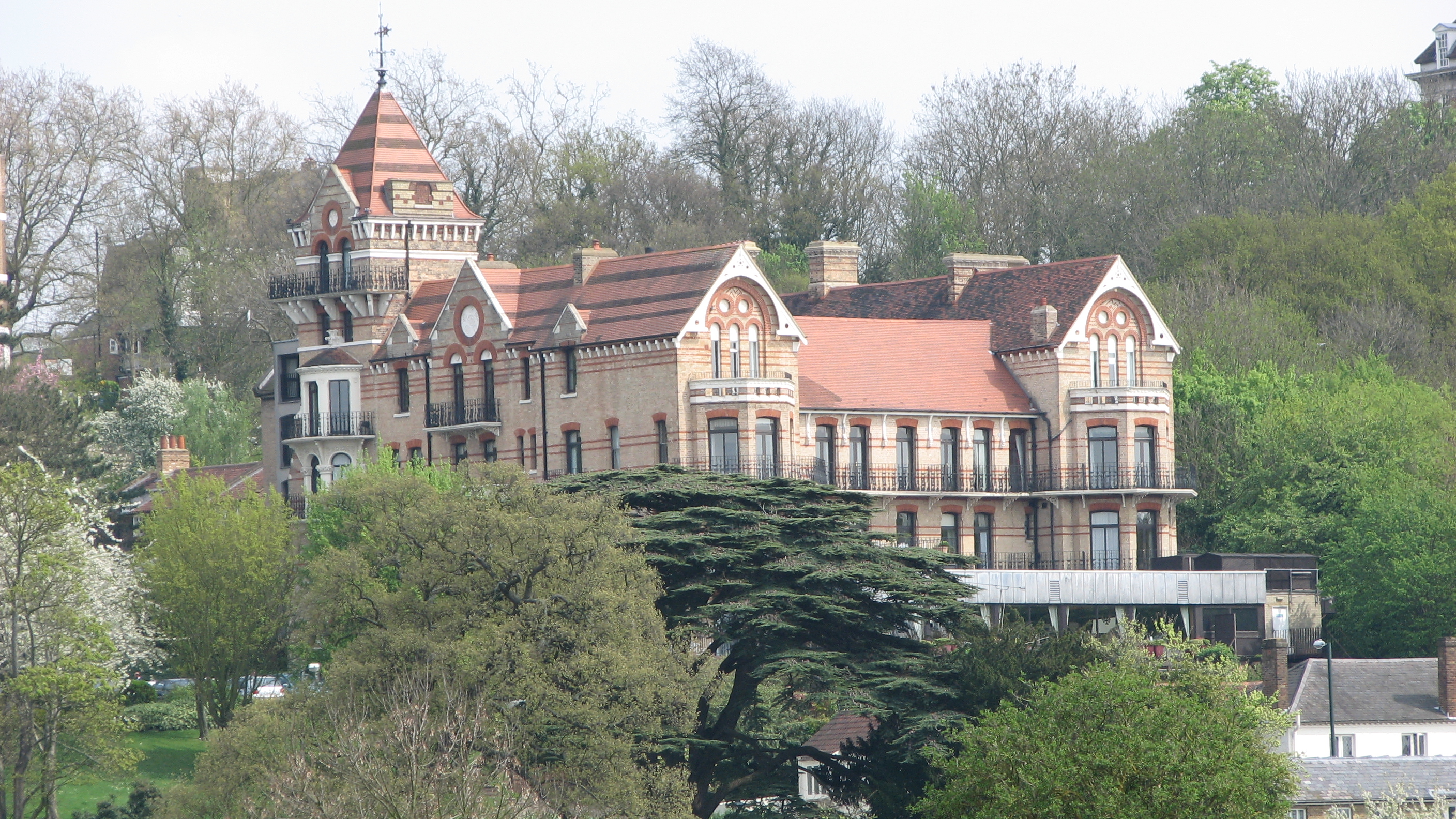
The Petersham Hotel overlooking the Thames at Richmond

- Petersham Hotel, Petersham completed in 1865
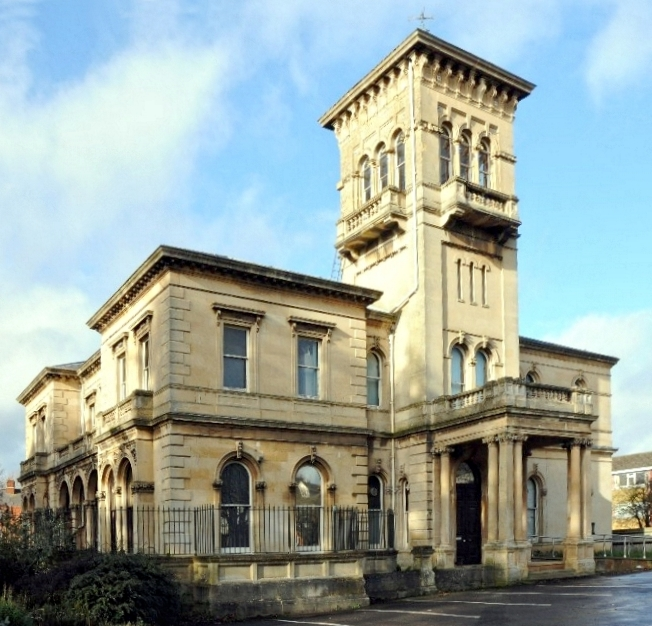
  Hillfield House, Gloucester (geograph 3833102)
- Torwood, Wimbledon Park, Surrey, a house illustrated in The Builder
- Hillfield House, Gloucester, a mansion faced in ashlar Bath stone and built in 1867-69 for the timber merchant Charles Walker. It is in the Italianate style popularised by Charles Barry with a centrally placed tower and an impressive porte-cochère entrance. Pevsner describes it as the most elaborate Victorian house in Gloucester. For some years, it housed local government offices. In 2014 it was sold for use as a residence and was extensively renovated.
- New End Hospital Hampstead, founded in 1869 as the infirmary for the Hampstead Union workhouse, and operated until 1986. The site has been redeveloped but the converted Giles building on Upper Walk remains.

=== Giles and Angell ===
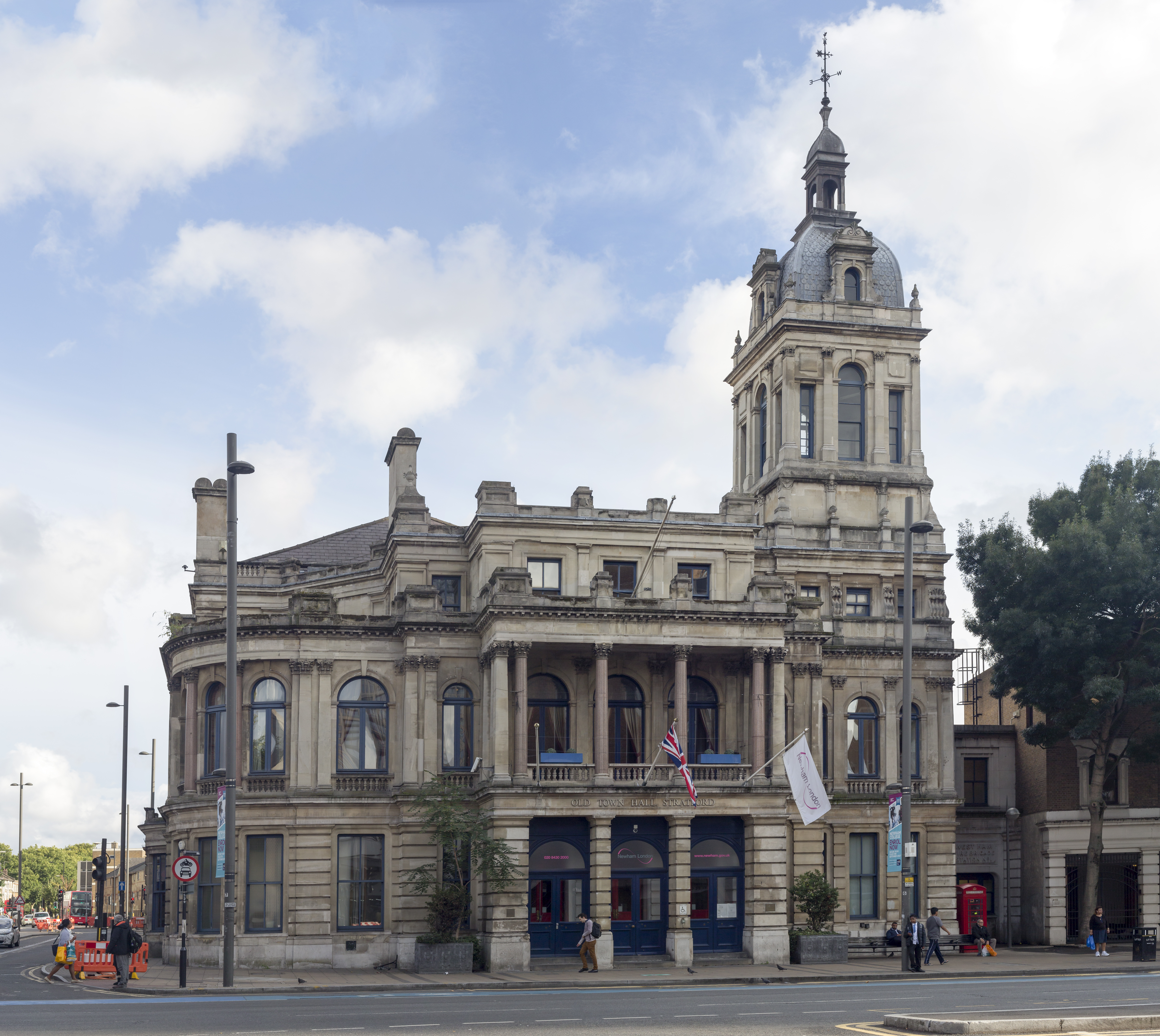
Old Town Hall Stratford

For a short time he worked with Lewis Angell, who was the District Surveyor for West Ham. They submitted a design for Stratford Town Hall (now known as Stratford Old Town Hall), beating thirty competing entries. The building was completed in 1869 and extended by Angell in 1881. The building is described as a confidently Victorian version of arched Cinquecento with rusticated stone ground floor with square headed window openings beneath an upper storey of round arched windows, divided by Corinthian columns. Carried off with considerable panache with an asymmetrical 100 ft domed tower. The balustraded parapets are decorated with allegorical figures.

=== Giles and Biven ===
By 1866 Giles was in partnership with Edward Biven at 28 Craven Street, when they designed an Infirmary for the St. Pancras Guardians of the Poor. This building is now part of the Highgate Wing of the Whittington Hospital.

=== Giles and Gough ===
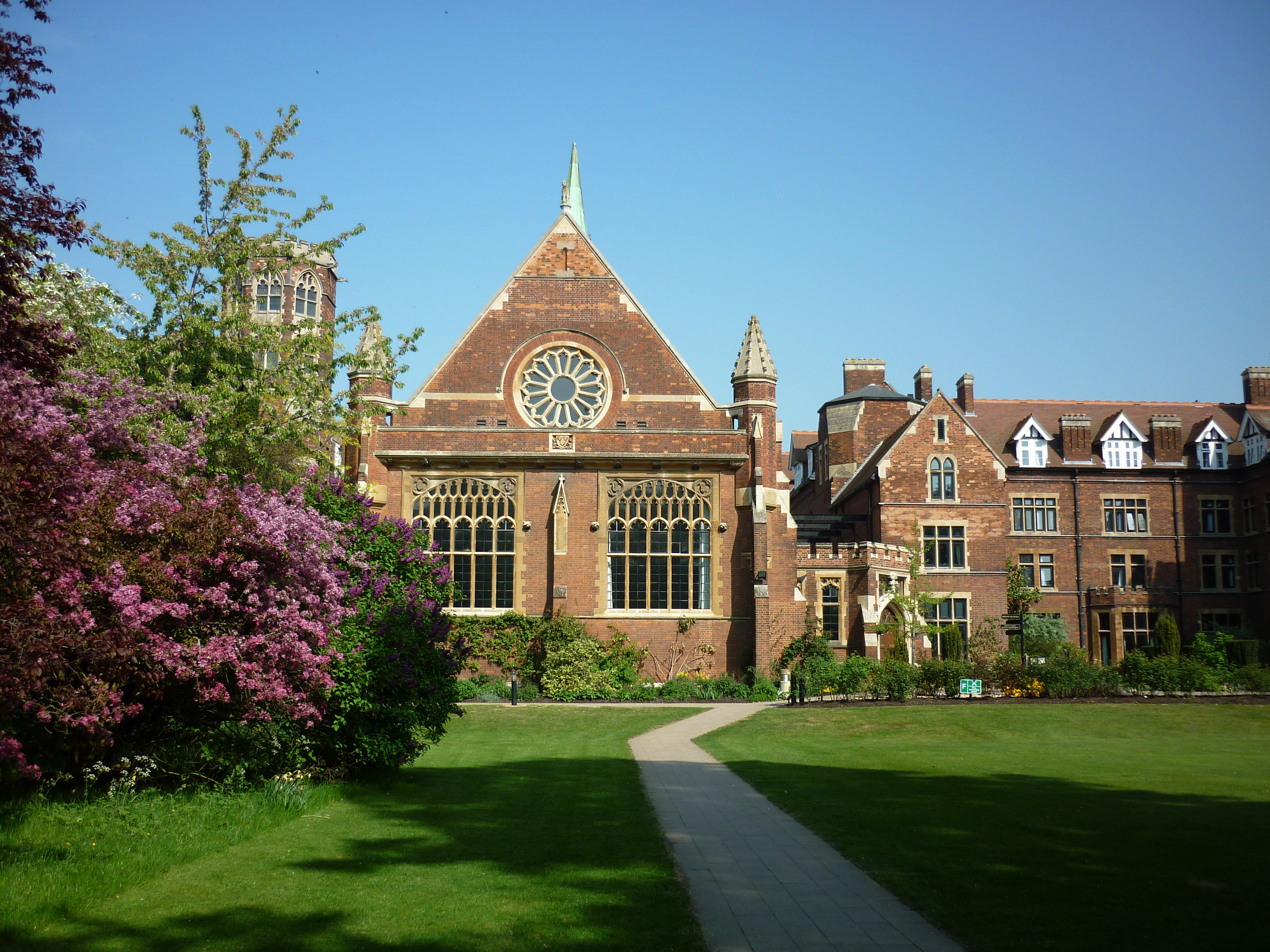
The Cavendish Building of Homerton College Cambridge.

By 1873 Giles was in partnership with Albert Edward Gough (died 1908) at Craven Street. The partnership increasingly specialised in asylum, hospital and workhouse architecture. Work by them includes:

- The extension wings to the Georgian workhouse in Cleveland Street, London in 1873
- Cavendish College, Cambridge (now part of Homerton College) in 1876–8. Homerton College, from London, moved into the buildings in 1894. Large, red-brick, Tudor, with asymmetrical Gothic tower, and Gothic Hall windows.
- Fulham Workhouse Infirmary. In 1883 Giles and Gough erected a pavilion-plan infirmary at the north of the workhouse site facing onto St Dunstan's road. It was a military hospital in the First World War. Now demolished to make way for the Charing Cross Hospital.
- Christ Church, Gipsy Hill, London
- New End Hospital, Hampstead.

=== Giles, Gough and Trollope ===
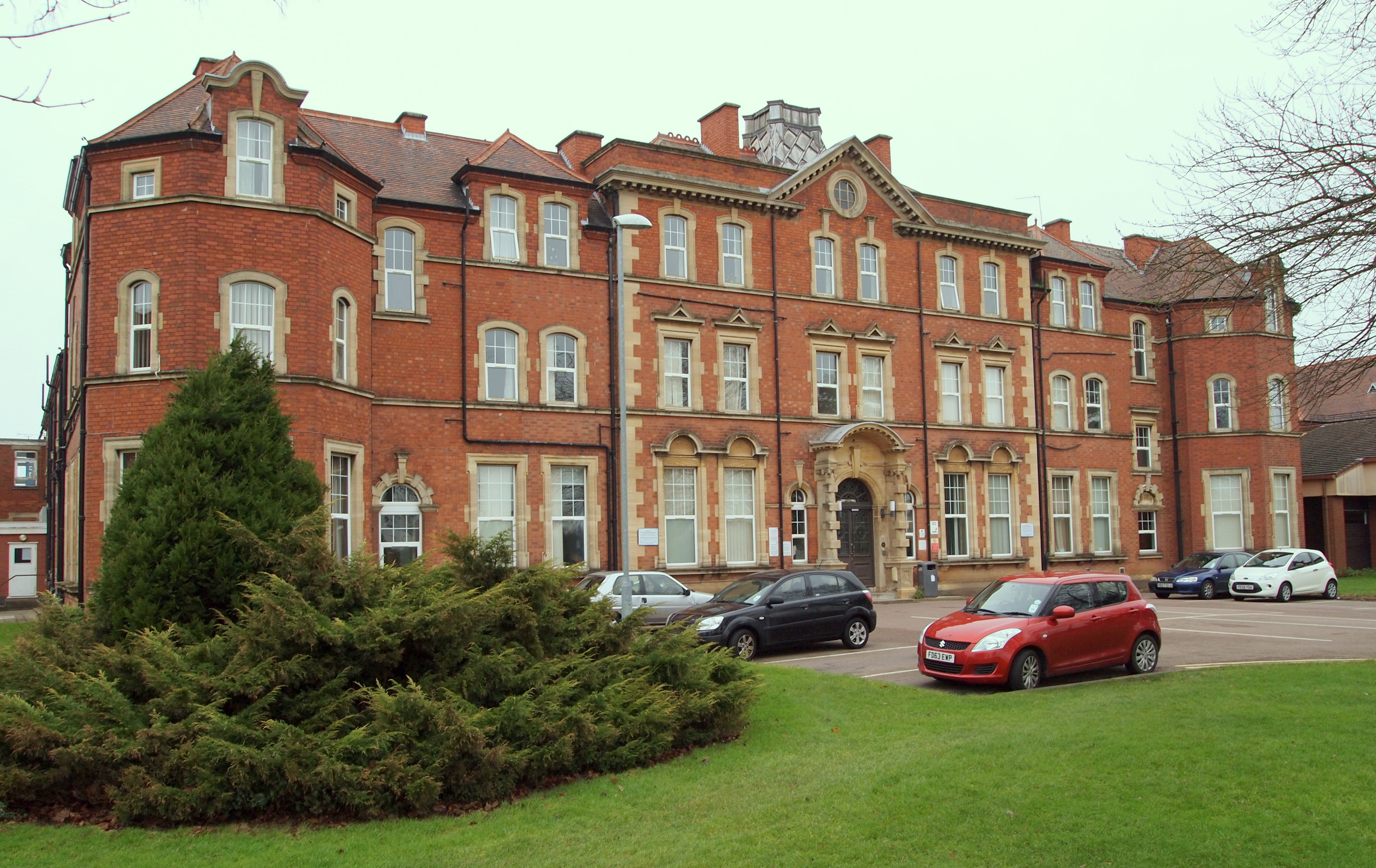
Leicester General Hospital, Evington, Leicester 1903–05

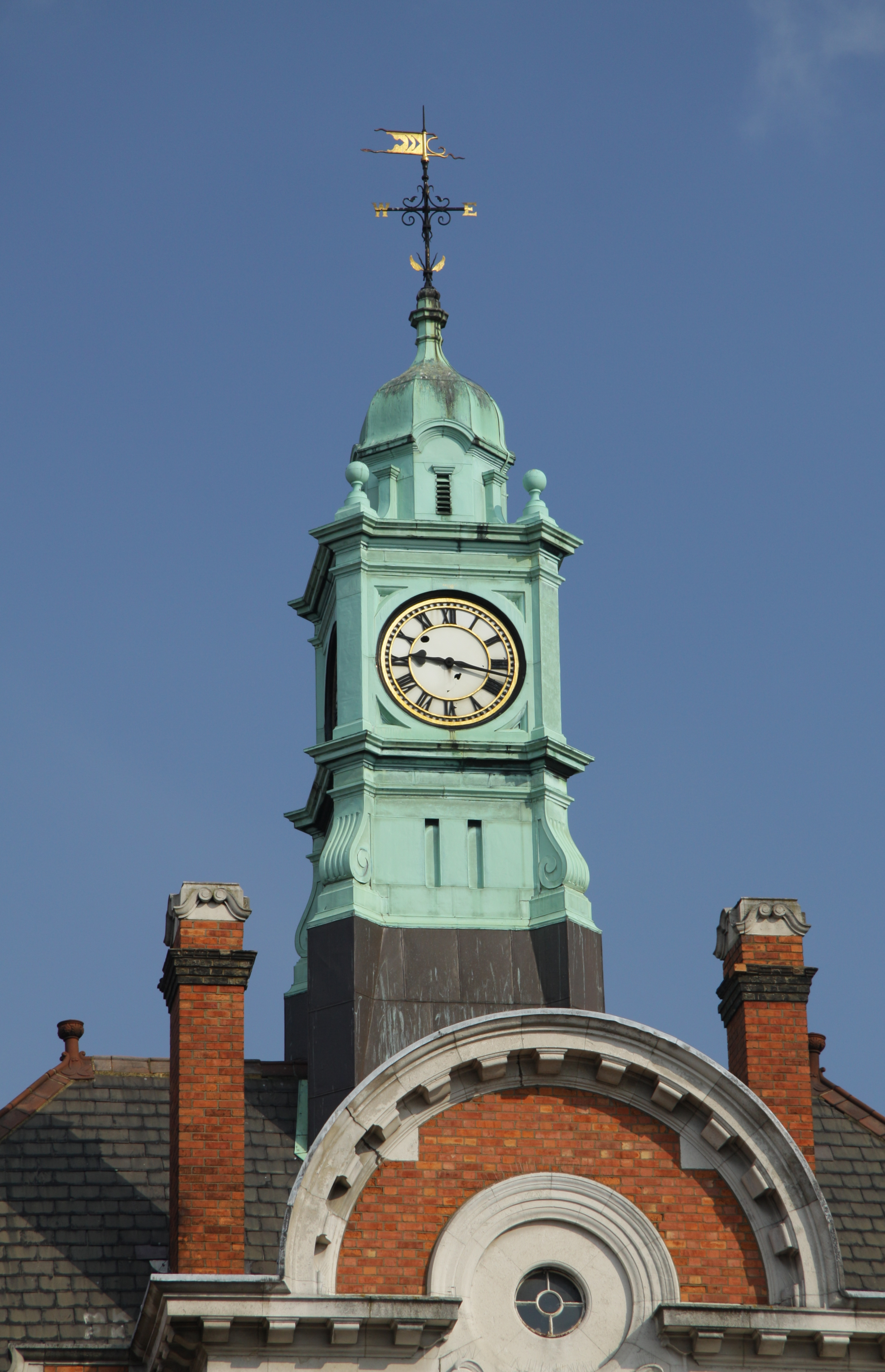
Hammersmith Hospital, clocktower

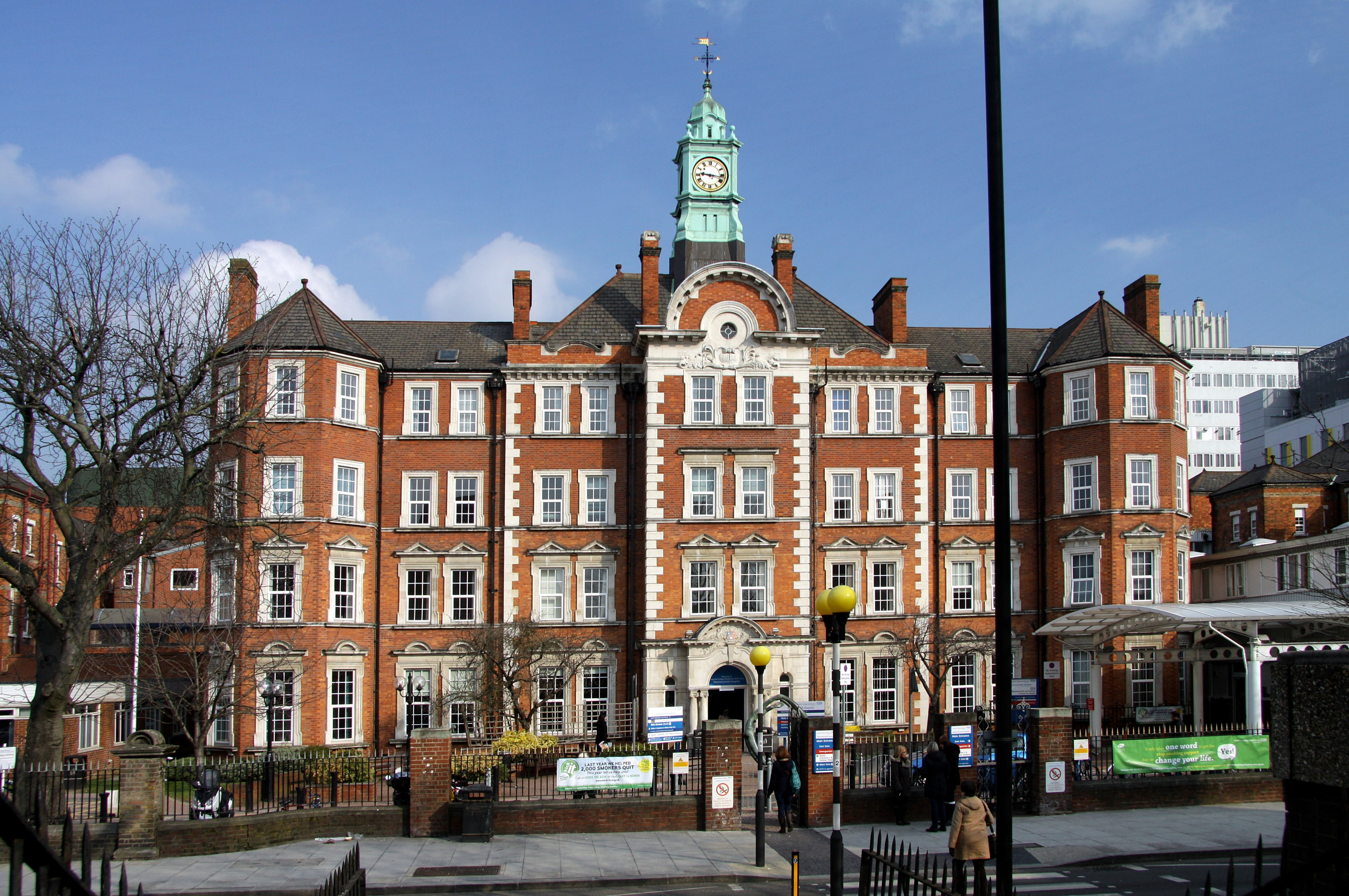
Hammersmith Hospital, London

By 1888 Giles and Gough were joined by John Evelyn Trollope, an architect who had trained under Sir Arthur William Blomfield. Trollope was to continue the practice at 28 Craven Street after Gough's death in 1908. Trollope died in 1912. The practice expanded considerably at this time, particular building hospitals and mental asylums. Also they built housing in London, in the Queen Anne revival style, normally in red brick and using terracotta decorative panels. Much of this housing appears to have been designed by John Evelyn Trollope. Buildings by Giles, Gough and Trollope:

- Leicester General Hospital The 62-acre site between Crown Hills and Evington village was purchased for £6,920 in 1902, with construction of the hospital beginning on 2 April 1903. The building, designed by Giles, Gough and Trollope, was completed at a cost of £79,575. Main block with a Baroque revival central entrance, flanked by long separate wings.
- Hammersmith Hospital. Du Cane Road. (1904), A handsome brick and stone building in Queen Anne style, four storeys with pedimented windows on the two lower storeys, canted corner bays and raised centre with an elegant clock turret.

==== Houses ====
- Aldford House, 63 South Audley Street, London W1 (1890) by J.E. Trollope of Giles, Gough & Trollope.
- 1-8 Carlos Place, London W1(c1897) by J.E. Trollope of Giles, Gough & Trollope. A four-story quadrant block of houses . . . in free English/Flemish Renaissance style, constructed in red brick, with lavish Portland stone dressings with canted bay windows, balustraded parapets and gables, enlivened on alternate houses by bands of red terracotta Renaissance decorative ornament.

== Giles and the building of asylums ==
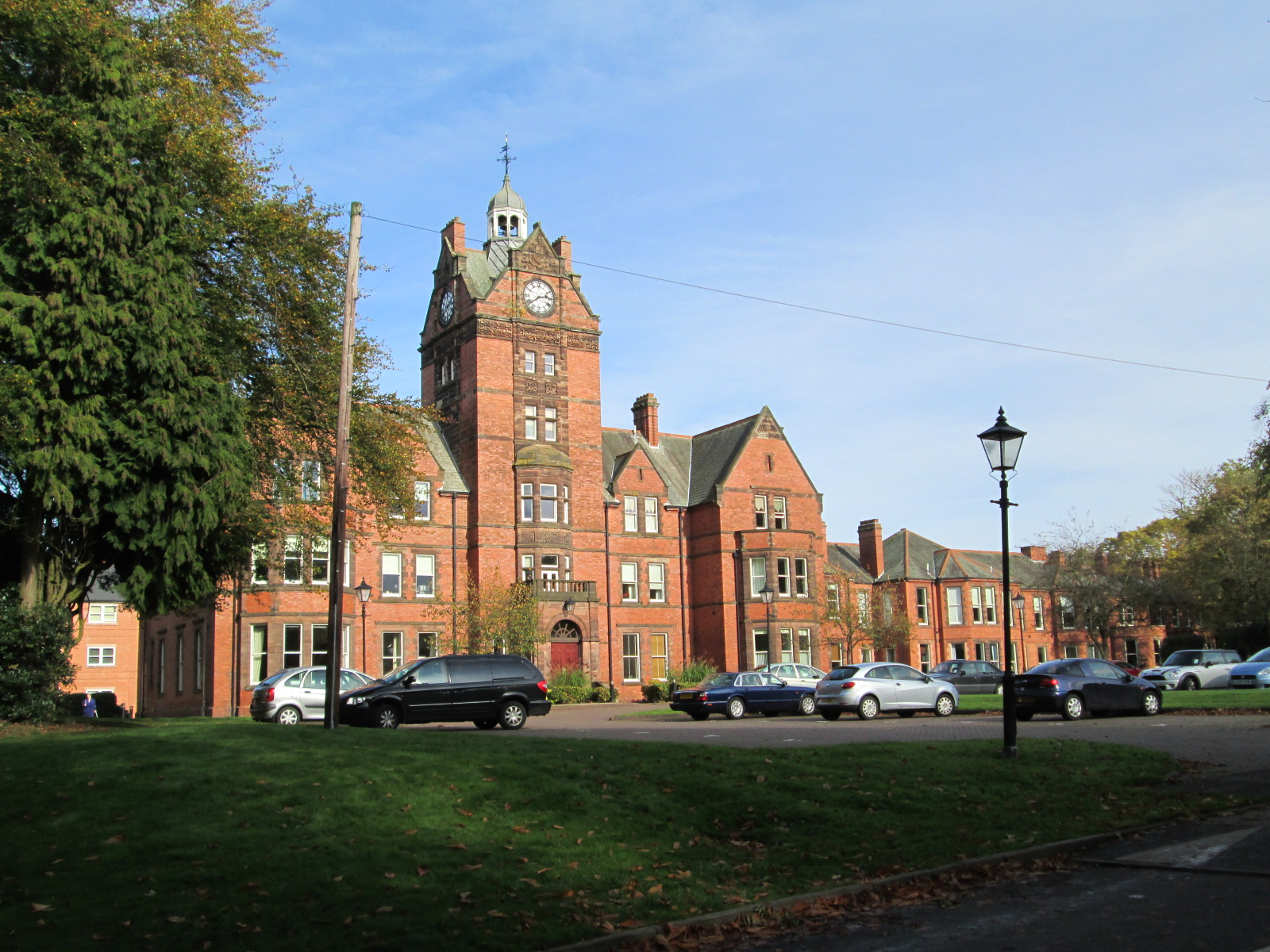
St Edwards Hospital, Cheddleton

Following Giles' innovative design for the Coney Hill Hospital in Gloucestershire, Giles became one of the most successful asylum architects, winning eight of the sixteen competitions he entered and coming second in four. Examples of work undertaken by his partnership are:

- Coney Hill Hospital, Gloucester. Built as the second Gloucestershire County Asylum. Giles and Gough won a competition to build this in 1879 and it was built in 1881–1883. It was the first asylum to be built in true echelon plan, but was never fully completed. Only the administrative block now survives.
- St Augustine's Hospital, Chartham, Kent. The asylum was opened on 5 April 1875. The buildings were completed in 1876 at a total cost of £211,852. Originally built to house 870 patients.
- St Edward's Hospital, Cheddeleton, Staffordshire. (Giles, Gough and Trollope) Opened 18 August 1899. Echelon layout. It closed in 2002 and has now been converted to housing.

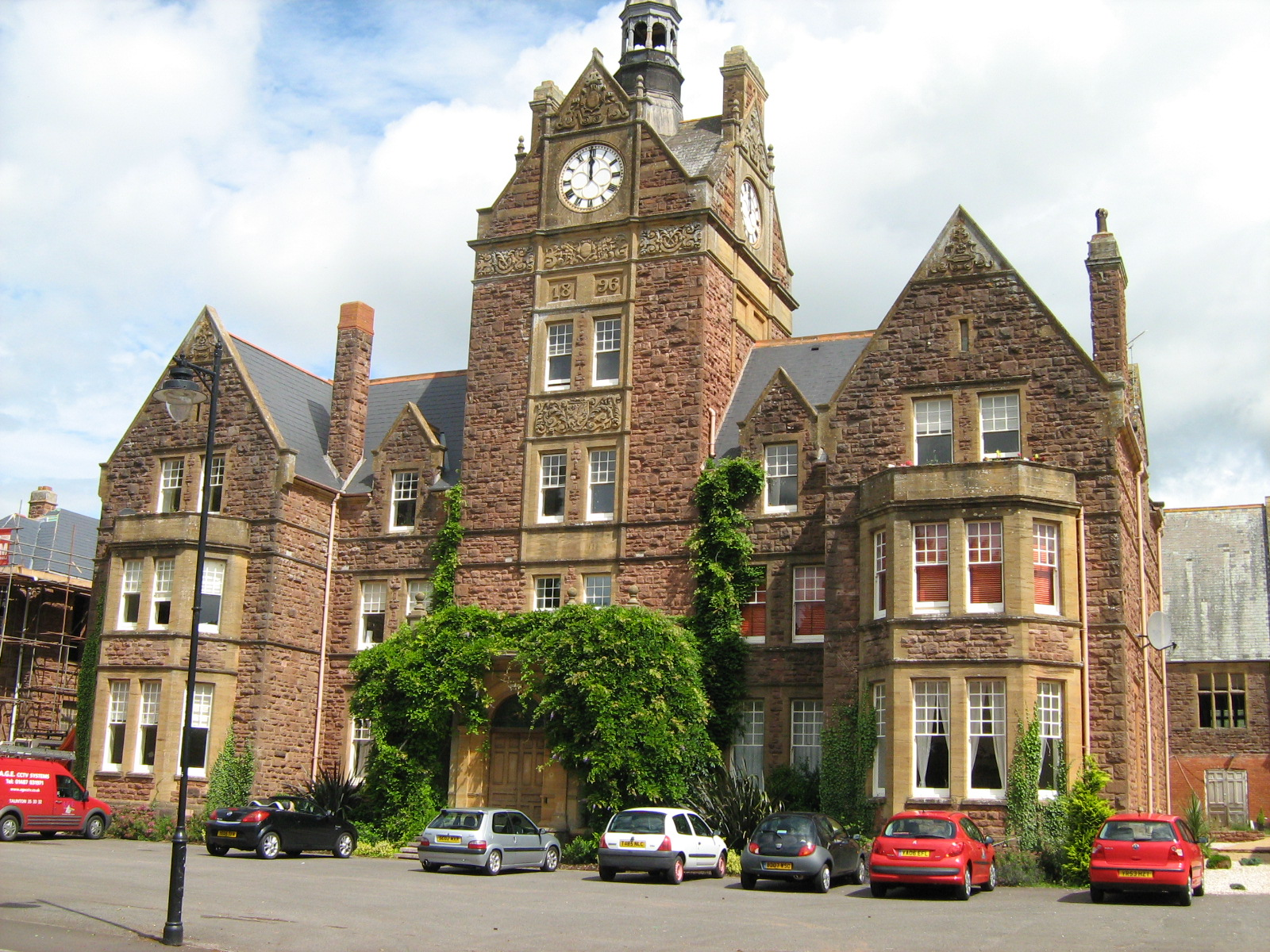
Tone Vale Hospital and clock tower

- Tone Vale Hospital, Cotford, Somerset. Tone Vale was founded as the second Somerset County Asylum in 1892, the first Somerset County Asylum near Wells having become overcrowded. The competition to design the asylum was won by Giles Gough and Trollope, and the first patient was admitted in May 1897.
- Talgarth Hospital, Powys. The building, designed by Messrs Giles, Gough and Trollope of London, followed the compact echelon or arrow plan and was built at a cost of £126,000. It was opened with public ceremony on 18 March 1903.

== Gallery ==
Buildings by John Giles

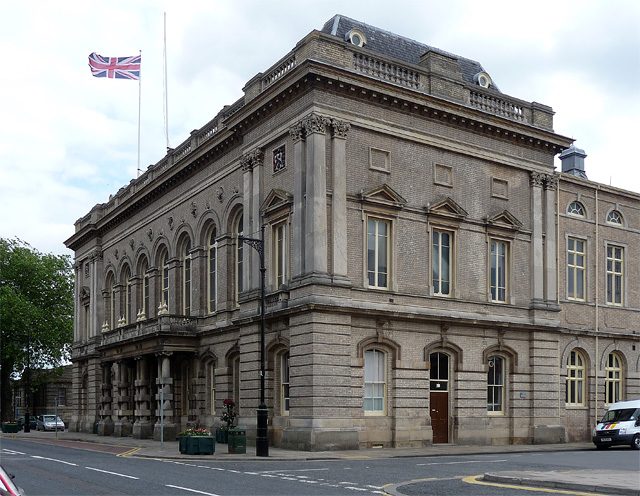
Town Hall, Grimsby (1861-3)

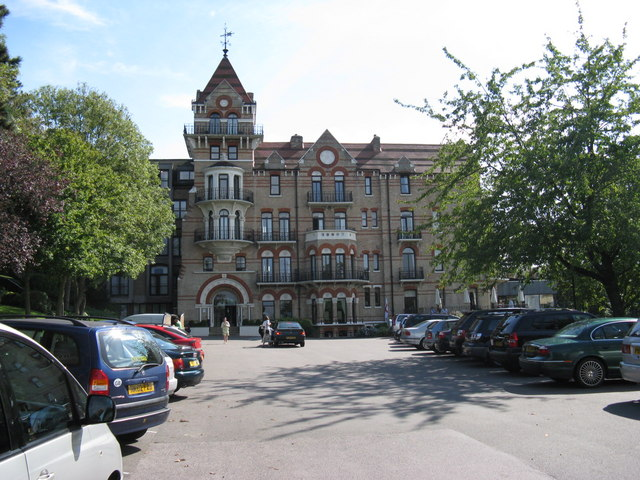
Petersham Hotel, Petersham, London (1865)

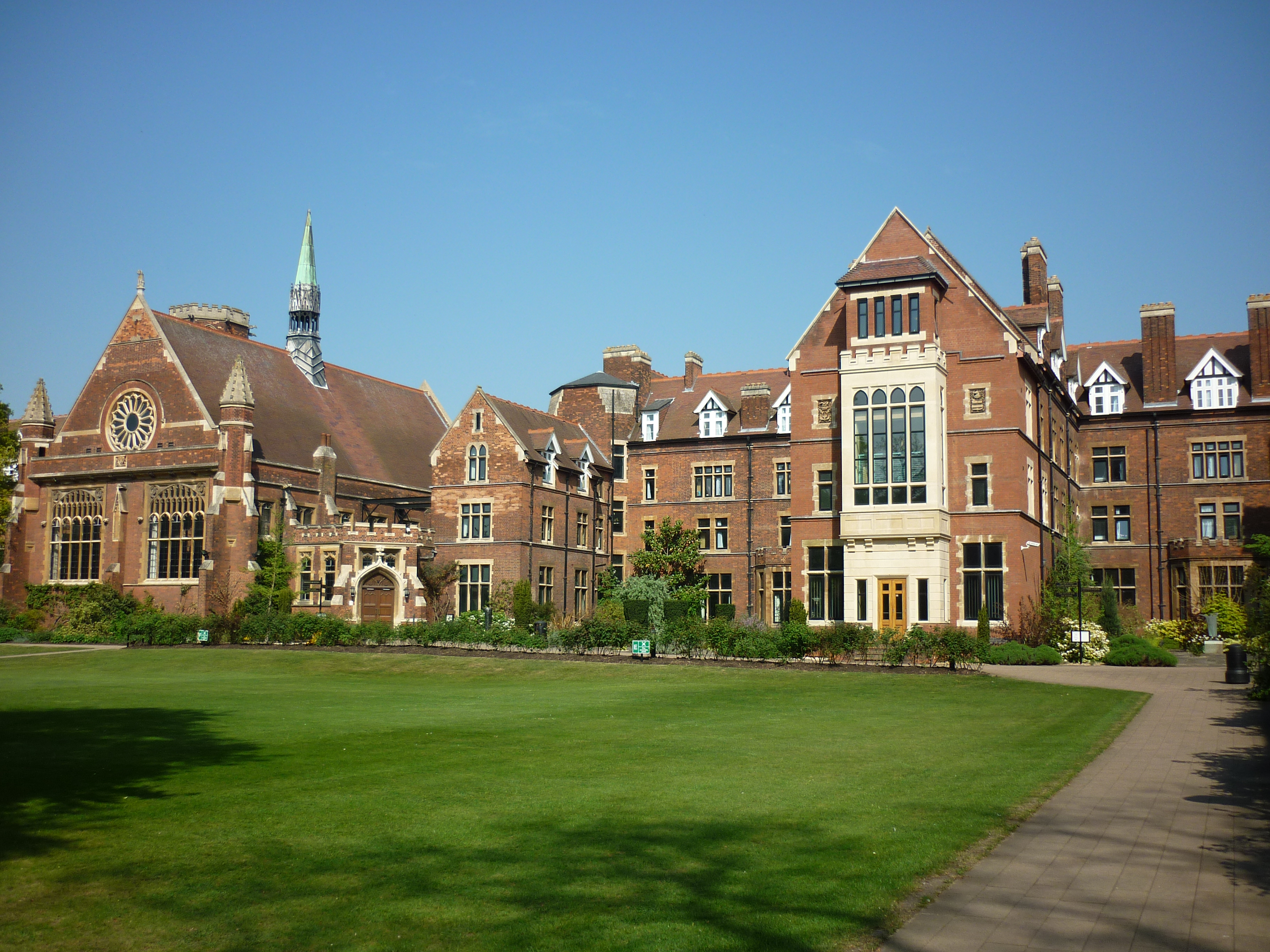
Cavendish Building, Homerton College, Cambridge (1878)
