= Christ Church, Gipsy Hill =

Church in South London, England

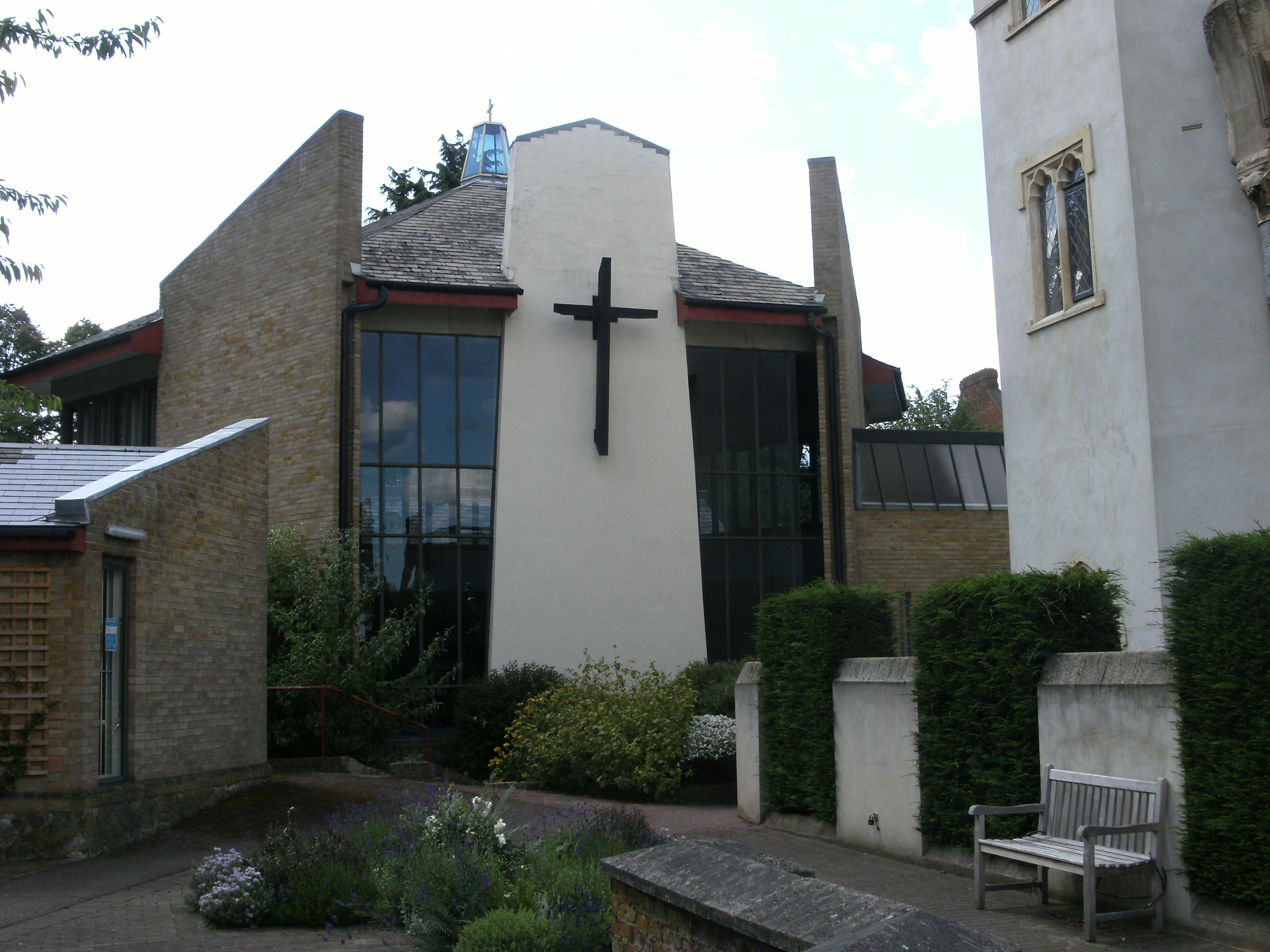
- Christ Church, Gipsy Hill
- 51.4217°N 0.0836°W
- Denomination: Church of England
- Website: http://www.gipsyhill.org.uk

Architecture
- Architect(s): John Giles & Brian Drury

Administration
- Province: Canterbury
- Diocese: Diocese of Southwark
- Archdeaconry: Lambeth
- Deanery: Lambeth South Deanery

Clergy
- Vicar: Rev Jenny Dawkins

Christ Church in Gipsy Hill is an Anglican Church in the London Borough of Lambeth. The remaining part of the original Victorian church building, the tower, which is now a private dwelling is a Grade II Listed Building and occupies a prominent position, the tower being a notable landmark in the area.

== Parish ==
During the first half of the 19th century, the area around Gipsy Hill was sparsely populated, much of it having been part of woodland. The relatively few houses included a mixture of modest cottages and villas for the well-to-do. The opening of the Crystal Palace at Sydenham in 1854 and of Gipsy Hill railway station two years later was followed by considerable residential development in the vicinity.

The parish of Christ Church, Gipsy Hill was formed from the south-eastern part of the parish of St Luke's, West Norwood. In 1862, a temporary iron church with seating for 500 persons was opened on the west side of Gipsy Hill opposite Camden Hill Road. This was replaced by a permanent structure a short distance to the north, on a site at the southern corner of Gipsy Hill and Highland Road that had been given by the Ecclesiastical Commissioners. Construction began in 1866 and the permanent church was consecrated on 5 June 1867.

In 1886, the population of the parish amounted to 4,668 and a total of three clergy ministered at Christ Church. The total (morning and evening) attendance as a proportion of the parochial population at that time stood at 33.3%. In 1901, the population of the parish stood at 5,338. In the following year, two clergymen were in post and attendance at services represented 28.0% of the parochial population.

For most of its history, there has been a daughter church in the parish. St Jude's mission church was built at Berridge Road in 1880, to a design by Frederic W. Ledger. The building was closed in the 1960s and subsequently demolished. Berridge Road Community Centre, which was opened in 1995, was for some years used for worship.

Based on statistics from the UK census, the Diocese of Southwark estimates the population of Christ Church parish was 6,200 in 2001 and 6,300 in 2011.

== Building ==
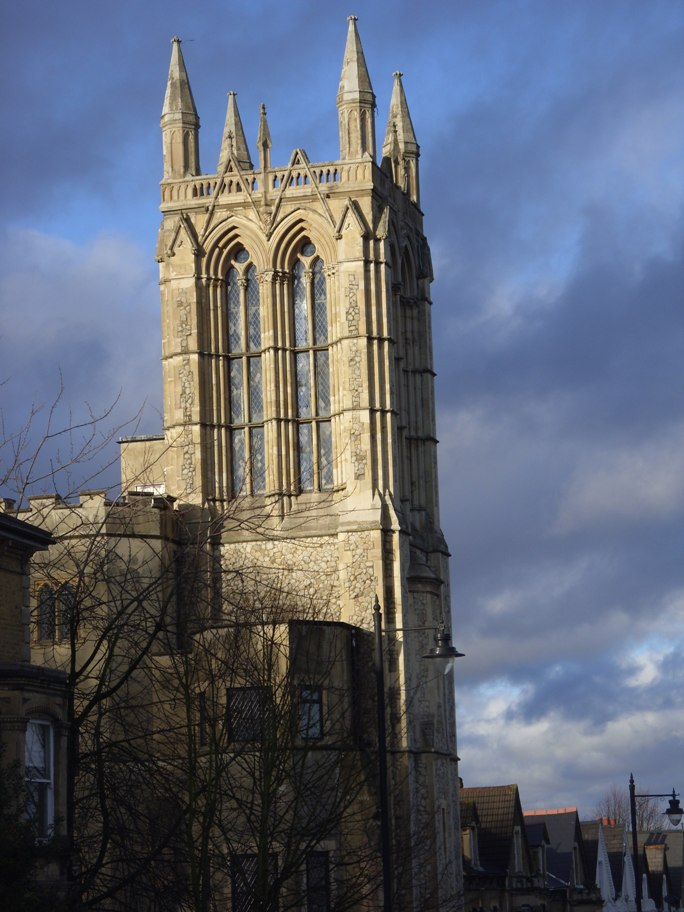
Tower of the Victorian building at Christ Church Gipsy Hill.

Christ Church is Grade II listed building standing in a prominent position on the west side of Gipsy Hill immediately north of its junction with Highland Road. The church that was consecrated in 1867 was designed by John Giles of Giles, Gough and Trollope. A large ragstone edifice with slated roofs, it consisted of a nave, aisles and a short apsidal chancel. Only 40 feet of the tower were included at that stage. Further building work in 1889 completed the tower and added a vestry and porch. The building was listed as of special architectural or historic interest in 1981 and the description on the English Heritage website relates to its condition at that time.

The majority of the Victorian building was destroyed by fire in 1982, almost the only fabric remaining from the 19th century being the tower. A new church building, designed by Brian Drury, was erected on the cleared site, providing a hexagonal worship area that connects directly to an entrance lobby and to the Goodliffe Hall, a 1960s structure that also survived the conflagration. The new building is of reinforced concrete structure, with timber roof trusses and is entered from Highland Road.

The Victorian church tower is of four stages with a short pyramidical spire and angle turrets. Since the fire in 1982, it has been extended, supplied with a lift and converted into a very unusual detached house called “Highland Tower”. Because of its size and commanding position on the upper part of a steep hill, this tower is a notable landmark.
