= Twickenham Methodist Church =

Church in Twickenham, England

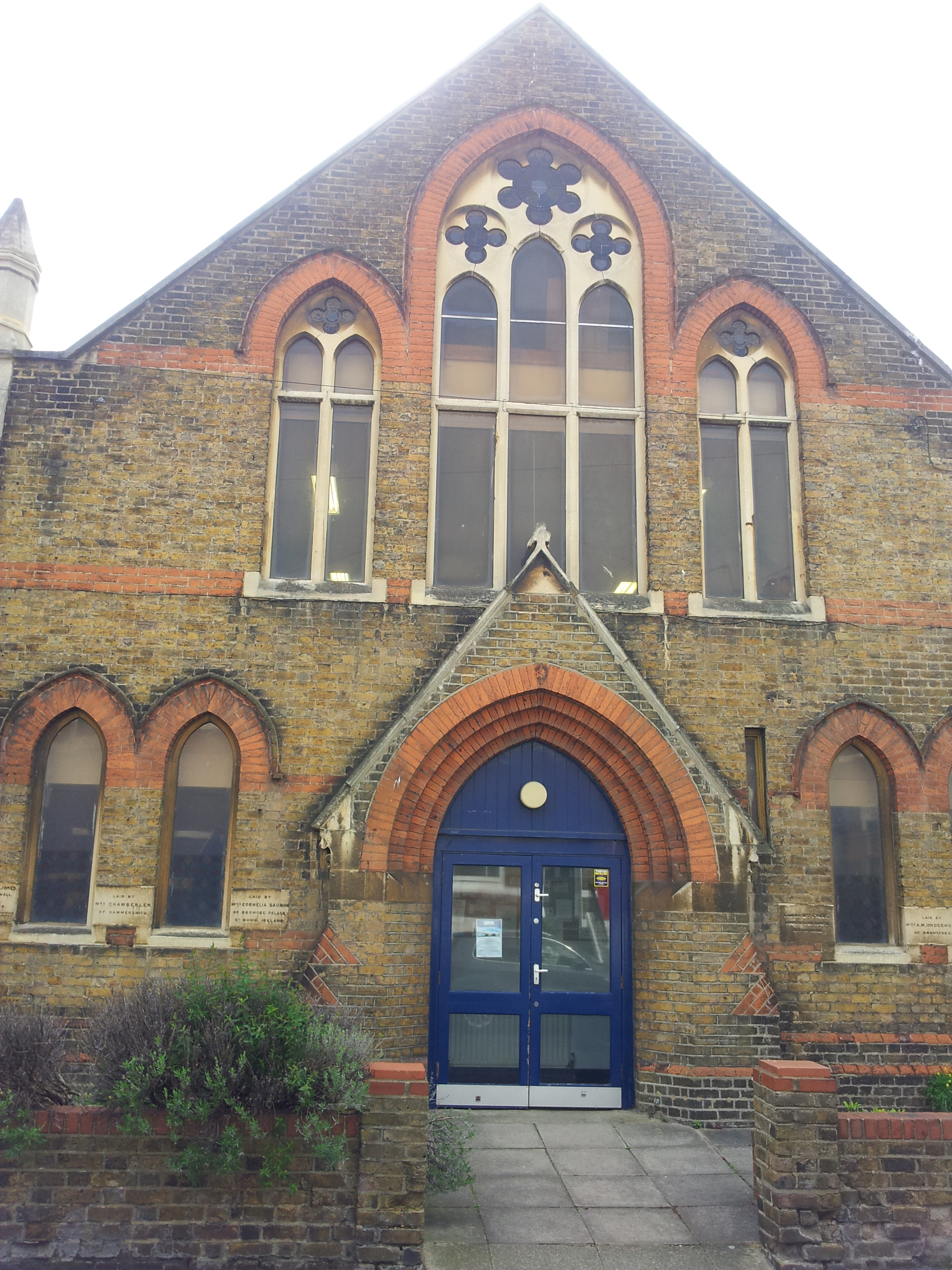
- Twickenham Methodist Church
- 51°26′47.3″N 0°19′49.4″W
- Location: 75-77 Queens Road, Twickenham TW1 4EN
- Country: England
- Denomination: Methodist

History
- Founded: 1800

Architecture
- Architect: Charles Bell
- Completed: 1881 (current church building)
- Closed: 2016

Administration
- Diocese: Richmond and Hounslow Methodist Circuit

Twickenham Methodist Church is a former Methodist church on Queens Road, Twickenham in the London Borough of Richmond upon Thames. It closed for worship in December 2016.

== History ==
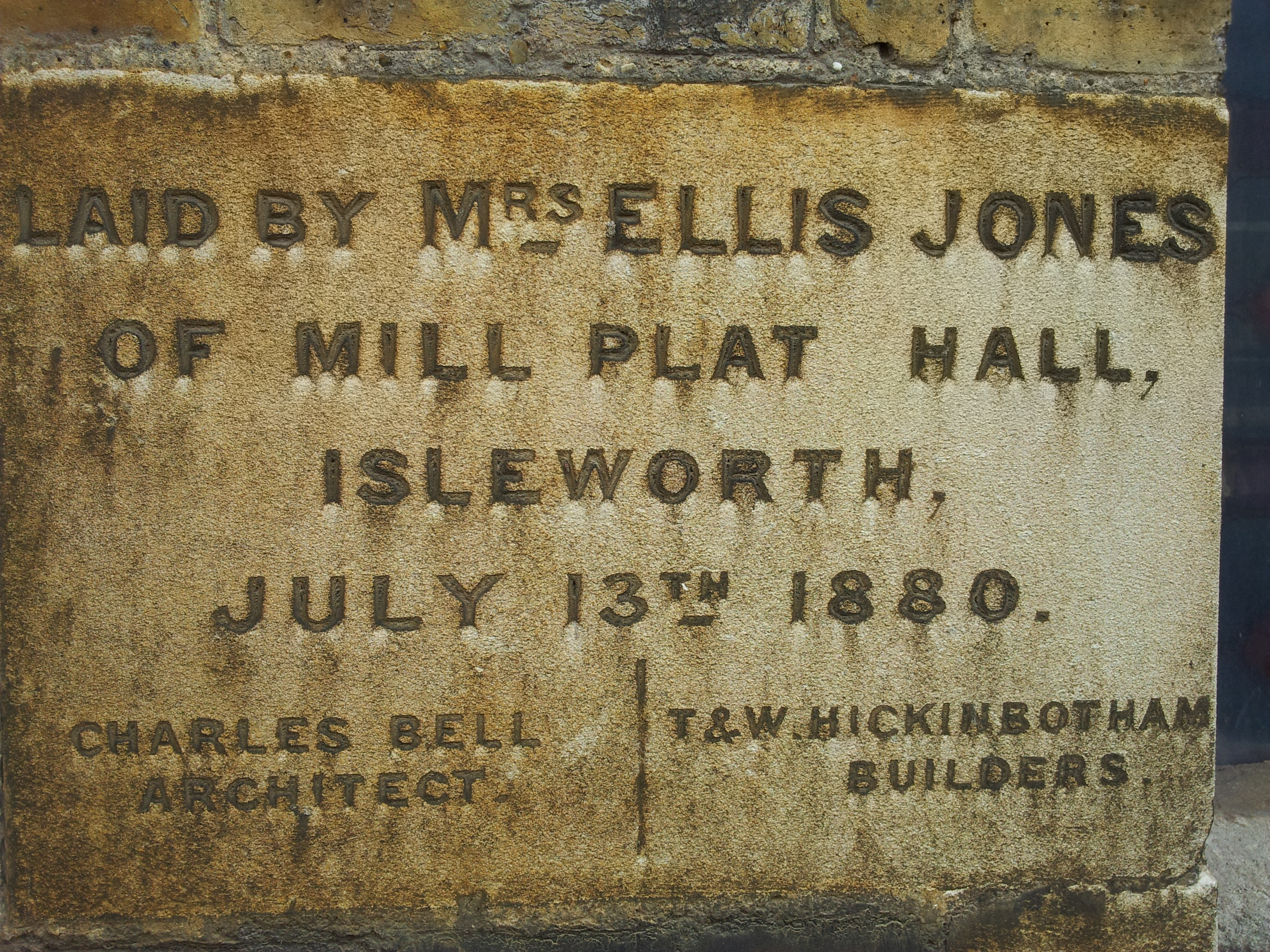
Foundation stone

The foundation stone for the chapel was laid on 13 July 1880. The architect was Charles Bell (1846–99), who specialised in designing Wesleyan Methodist chapels. It replaced the previous Methodist chapel on Holly Road becoming, at the time, the only non-Anglican place of worship in Twickenham and was constructed by the building firm T and W Hickinbotham.

The chapel became the hall and Sunday school when a new church, the Christ Church, was added in 1899. The Christ Church building was demolished in 1986. The church closed in December 2016.
