= Charles Bell (British architect) =

British architect

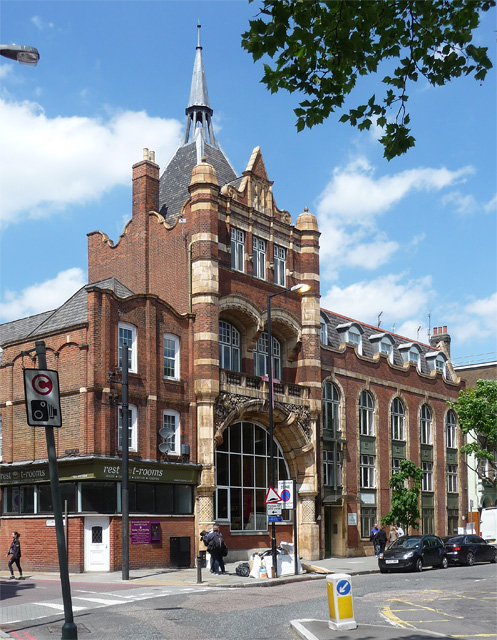
- Bermondsey Central Hall, Bermondsey Street
- Born: 1846; Bourne, Lincolnshire
- Died: 1899 (aged 52–53)
- Education: Pupil of John Giles
- Occupation: Architect
- Awards: FRIBA
- Buildings: Holme School, Grimsby, Kent College Canterbury and Darwen Town Hall.
- Projects: John Wesley Memorial Church and buildings, Epworth, Lincolnshire.

Charles Bell FRIBA (1846–99) was a British architect who designed buildings in the United Kingdom, including over 60 Wesleyan Methodist chapels.

== Career ==
Bell, who was born in 1846 and came from Bourne in Lincolnshire, was educated at Grantham Grammar School. He was articled to the London architect John Giles. In 1870 he was elected an Associate of the Royal Institute of British Architects and started independent practice. In 1888 he was working from Dashwood House, 9 New Broad Street, London.

His works include:

=== Public building ===
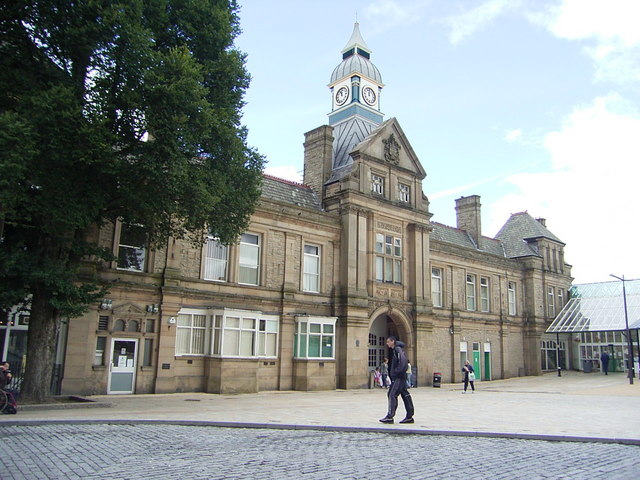
Darwen Town Hall

- Over Darwen Town Hall, Lancashire (1879)
- Newark Market Hall, Middle Gate. Newark, Nottinghamshire (1883-4). Iron arched frame with brick frontage and Dutch Gable.

=== Commercial buildings ===
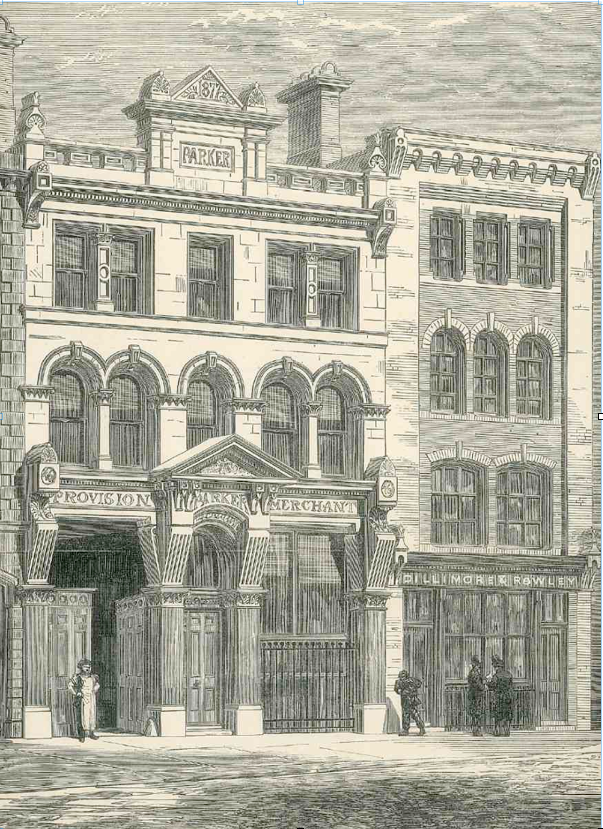
Nos 42 and 44–46 St John Street. Clerkenwell, London 1877

- Bacon Warehouse and Smokery, 42 & 44–46 St. John Street, Islington, London (1877) Warehouses. No. 42 for Dillamore & Rowley, cork manufacturers, Nos 44–46 for Edward Richard Parker, provision merchant. Nos 44–46. shows the ground floor with embellishments in Portland stone, with polished granite pilasters. The upper part, faced in Bath stone. At the back was a bacon smoking warehouse.

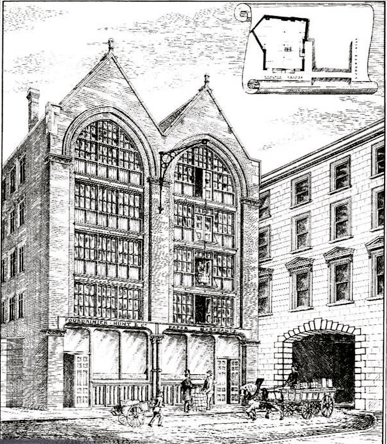
Warehouse, Ludgate Hill

- New Warehouse, Ludgate Square, London for Messrs. Fourdrinier, Hunt and Co. 1878. Wholesale Paper Merchants.

=== Schools ===
- Kent College (originally the Wesleyan College), Canterbury (1885). Boys’ Methodist Public School.
- Fairfields Primary School, Basingstoke.(1887). Red brick with filling-in of knapped flint work characteristic of the district. Bell described the school as Queen Anne, modified to suit their special purpose. There was ample light in each classroom by means of large windows; open fires heated the infants’ department, but innovative heating in the senior school was provided by a hot water boiler supplying radiating coils.
- Mawney Primary School, Mawney Road, Romford, Essex. (1896), Nicely scaled with pitched roofs, tile hanging, two-bay arched entrance. Demolished and replaced in 2017.

=== Children's holiday home ===
- Passmore Edwards Holiday Home for Children, Marine Parade, Clacton on Sea. 1898. The Home later became a Convalescent Home and was demolished in 1986.

=== Cemetery layout and cemetery chapels ===
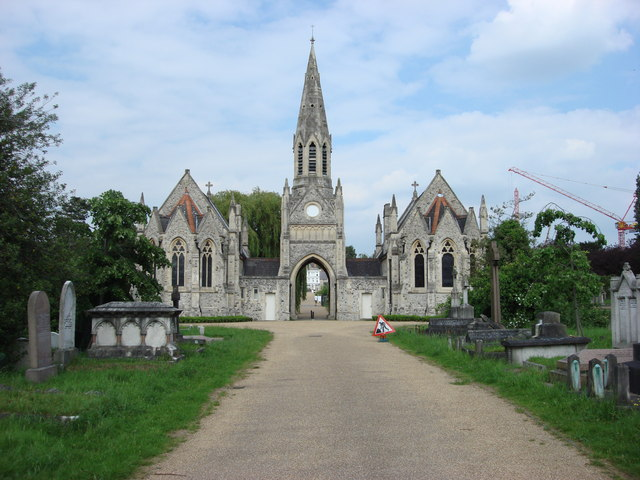
Hampstead Cemetery chapels

- Hampstead Cemetery. 1876. Bell designed the cemetery layout, lodges and cemetery chapels for the Hampstead Cemetery. For the double cemetery chapel with a central arch surmounted by a short spire he is either copying or modifying a design which was widely used in Lincolnshire and the Midlands by the Lincoln architects Bellamy and Hardy.

=== Methodist churches ===
- Vale Royal Methodist Church, Royal Tunbridge Wells, Kent (1873; closed 2015)
- Rivercourt Methodist Church, King Street, Hammersmith, London (1875)
- Wesley Memorial Church, Oxford (1878)
- Roupell Park Methodist Church in Norwood Road, Lambeth (1879–80)
- St Augustine in Baring Road, Grove Park, Lewisham (1885–86)
- Southlands Methodist Church, York (1886–87)
- Twickenham Methodist Church, Twickenham, London (1880)
- Leytonstone Methodist Church, Leytonstone, London (1880)
- Ryde Methodist Church, Ryde, Isle of Wight (1883)
- Ampthill Wesleyan Methodist Church, Bedfordshire opened 1884
- Wesleyan Chapel, New Hampton-road, Whitmore Reans, Wolverhampton, (1885–86)
- Trinity Wesleyan Methodist Church, Romford, Essex opened 1888
- Bermondsey Central Hall, South London Mission (1900: Bell's facade, which includes a Tudor gatehouse motif, was retained when the hall was rebuilt in 1968)

== Gallery of Methodist churches by Charles Bell ==
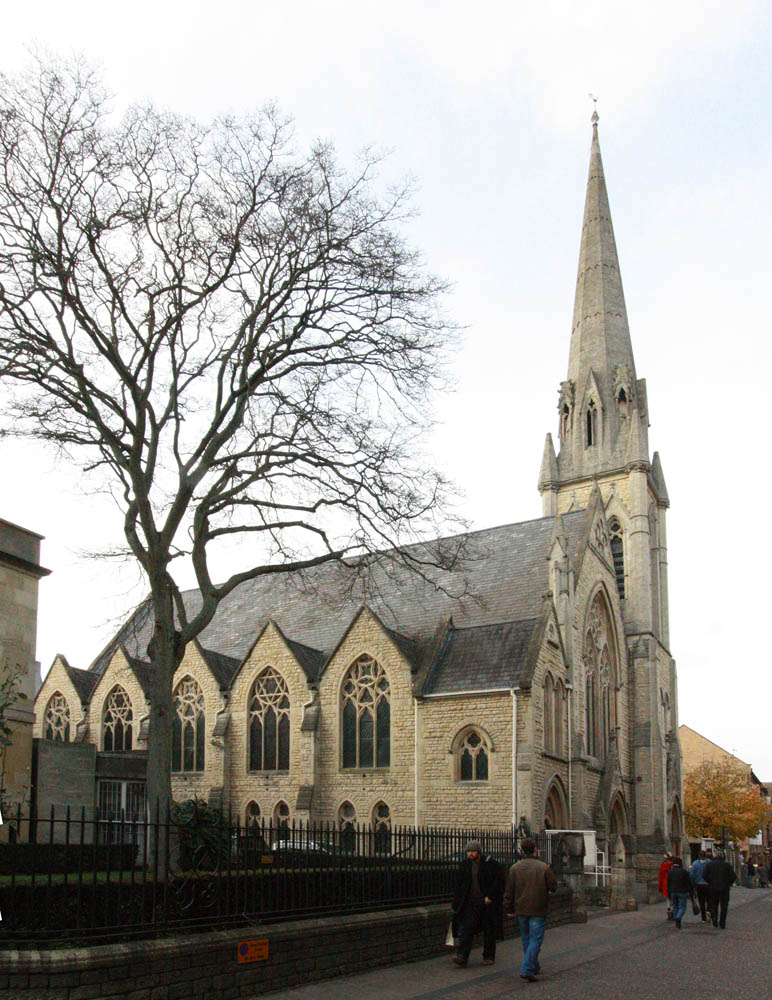
Wesley Memorial Methodist Church, Oxford

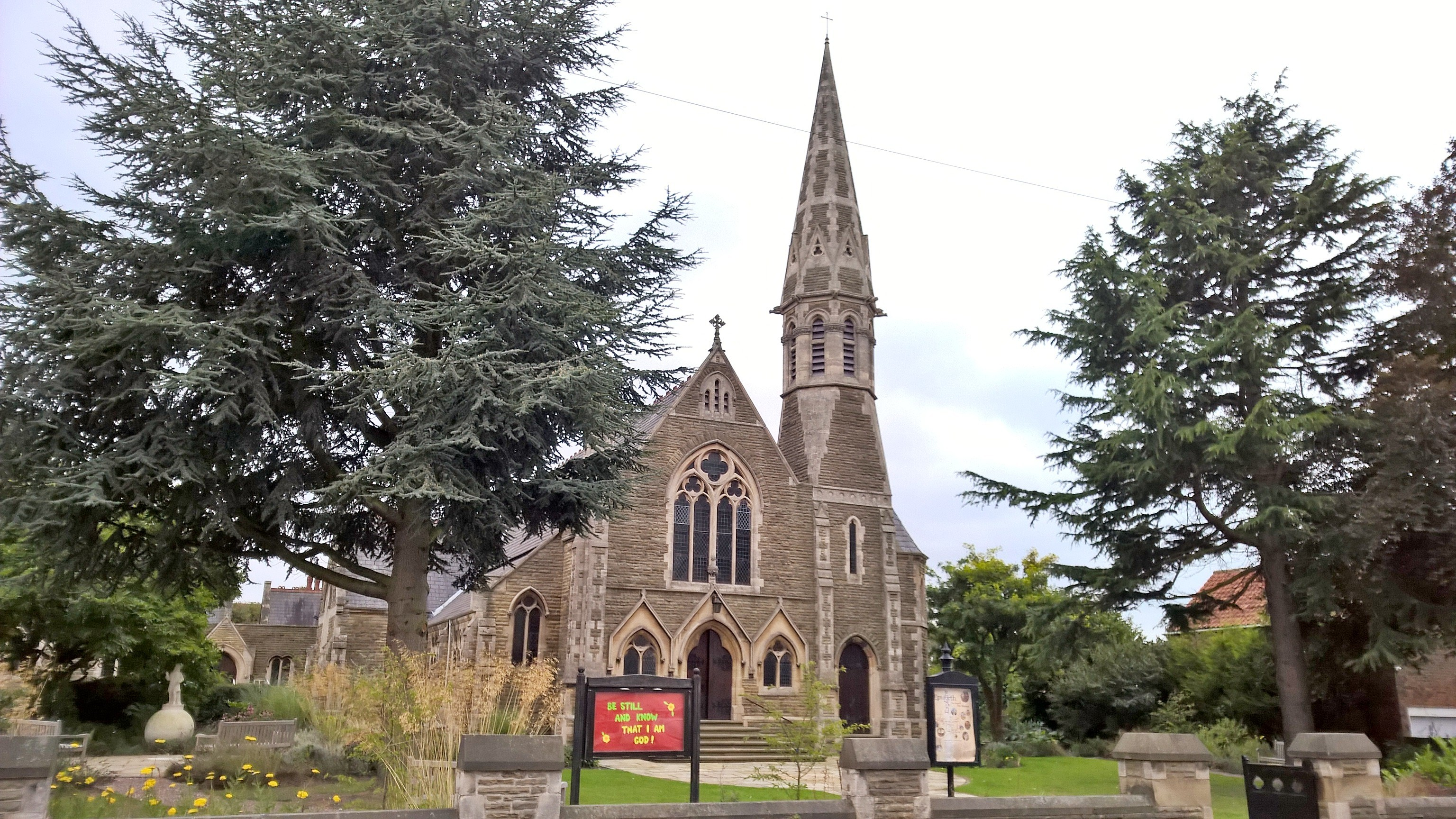
Wesley Memorial Church, Epworth, Lincolnshire

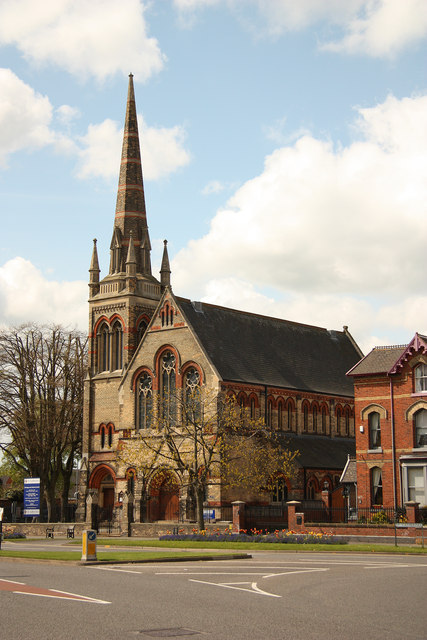
St.Catherines Methodist church, Lincoln

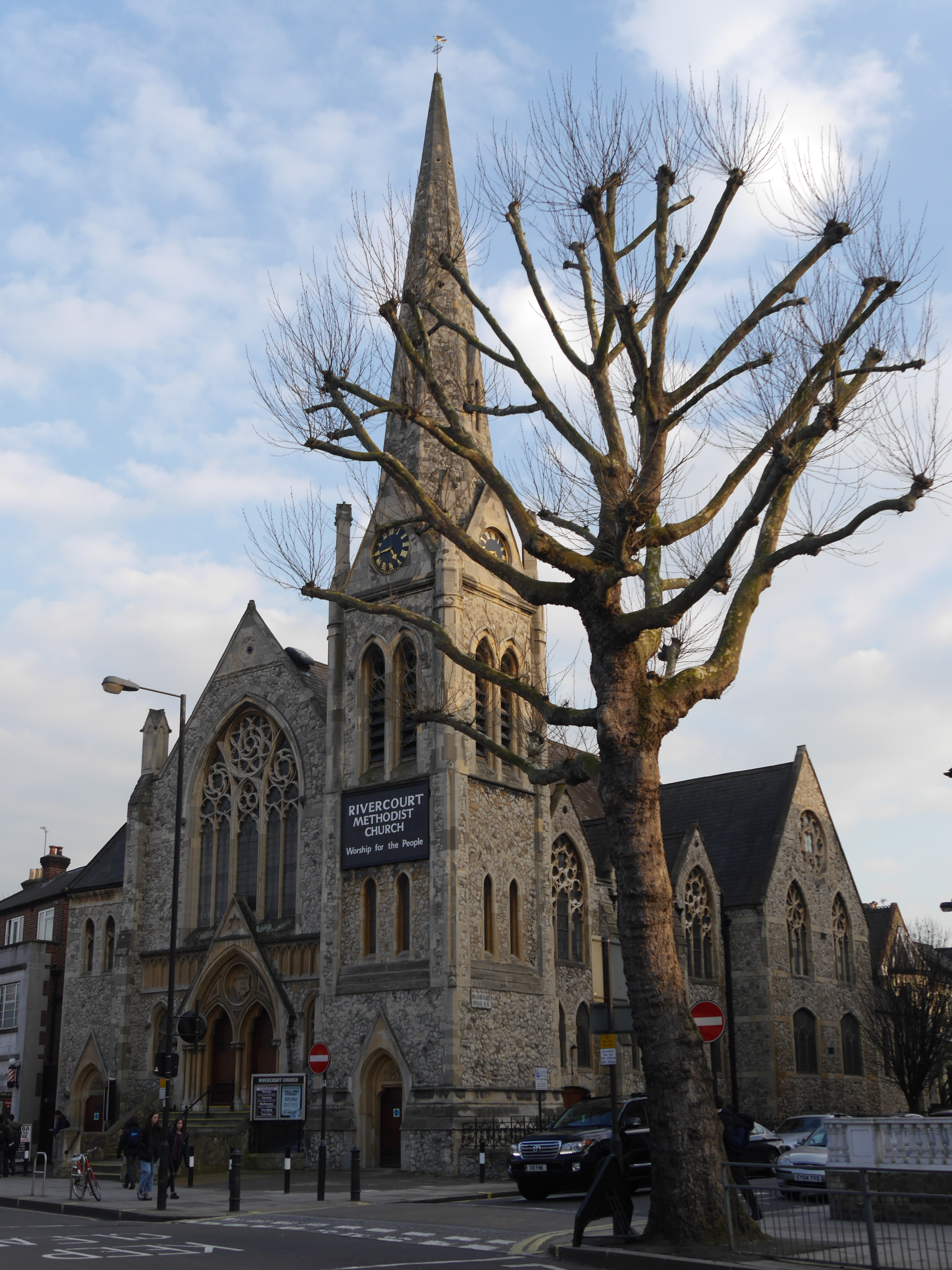
Rivercourt Methodist Church, Hammersmith, London

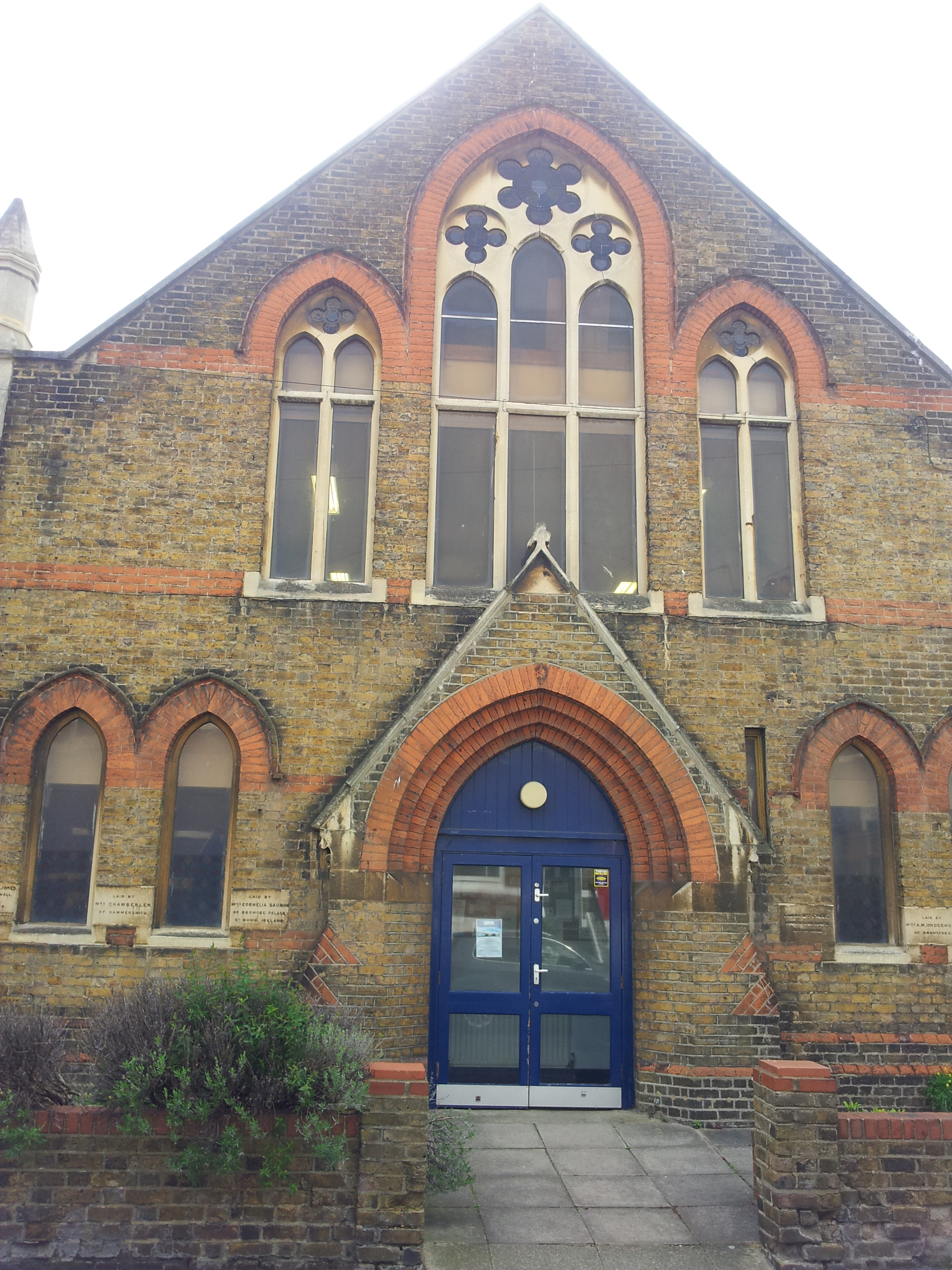
Twickenham Methodist Church, Twickenham, London

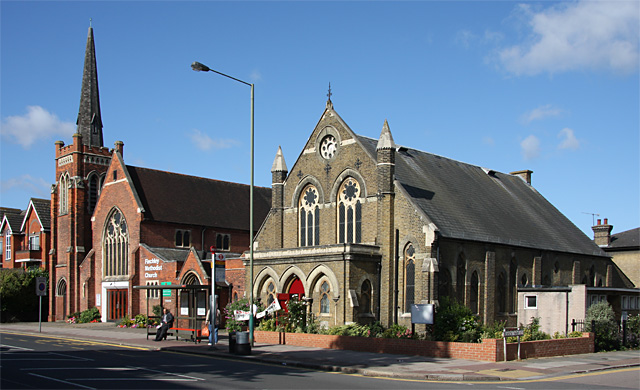
Finchley Methodist Church

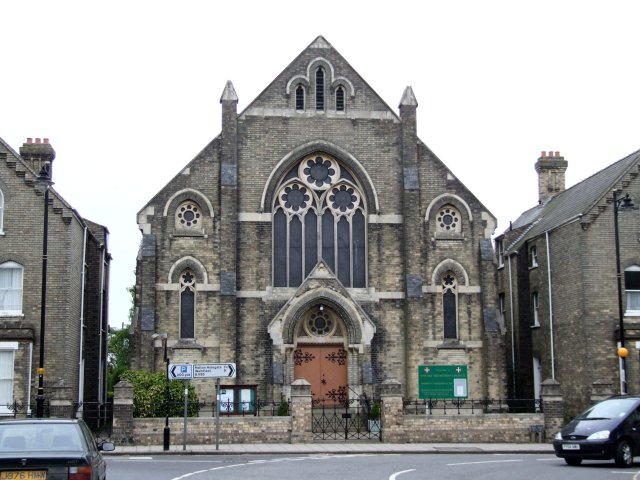
Spilsby Methodist Church, Lincolnshire 1877-8

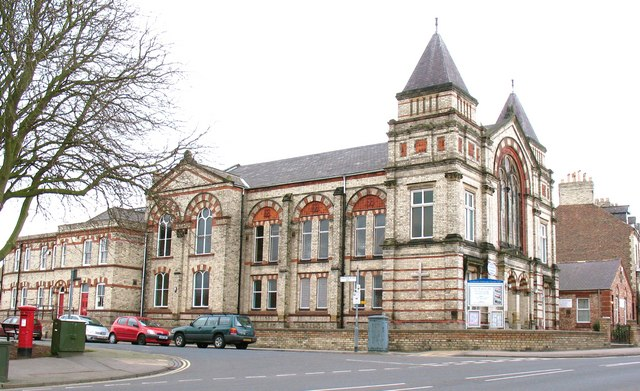
Southlands Methodist Church, York.1887.

== Work in Lincolnshire ==
Bell also had an office in the 1880s in Grimsby in Lincolnshire. Bell described himself as of London and Great Grimsby on his drawing of the Liberal Club in Grimsby published in The Building News, 21 November 1884. His work in Lincolnshire included:

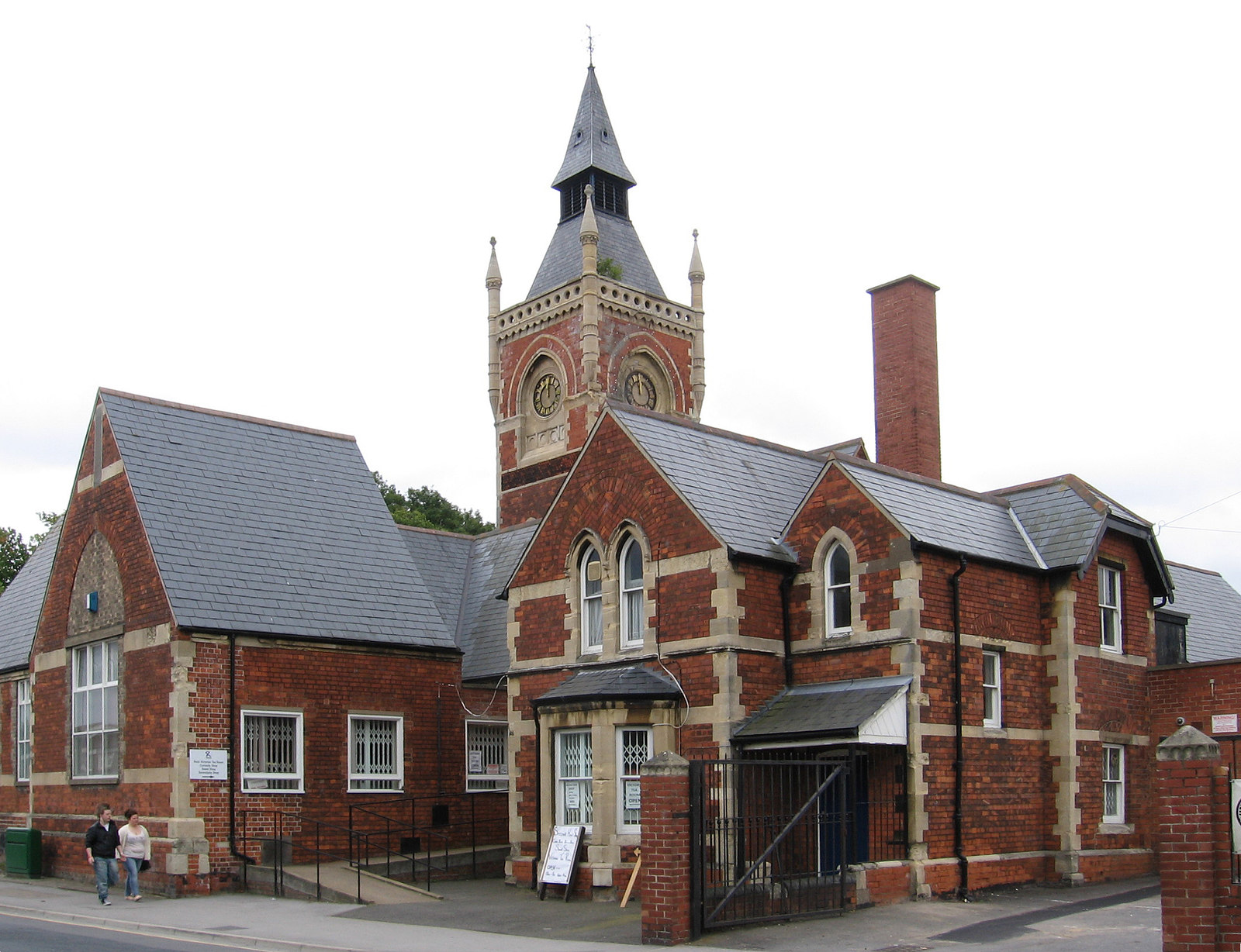
Holme Hill School, Grimsby

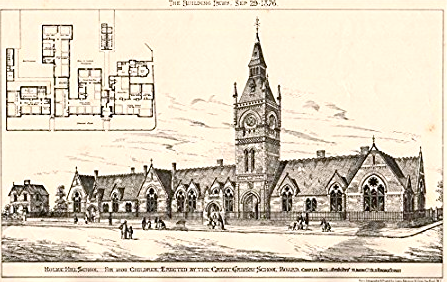
Holme Hill School Grimsby

- Holme Hill School, Grimsby, Lincolnshire (1876). Corner of Heneage Road and Wellington Street. The school was built for the Great Grimsby School Board to accommodate 1,165 children and cost £11,749. Over the entrance a central roundel bearing relief carving of the town seal with figures of Grim and Havelock the Dane, and above a stone band, inscribed “Great Grimsby Public Elementary Board School”. The School closed in 1967 and was extensively restored in 2014.
- The Grimsby Fisherlads Institute. Building with a tower on a corner site. Later extended by the architect J. J. Creswell of Grimsby.

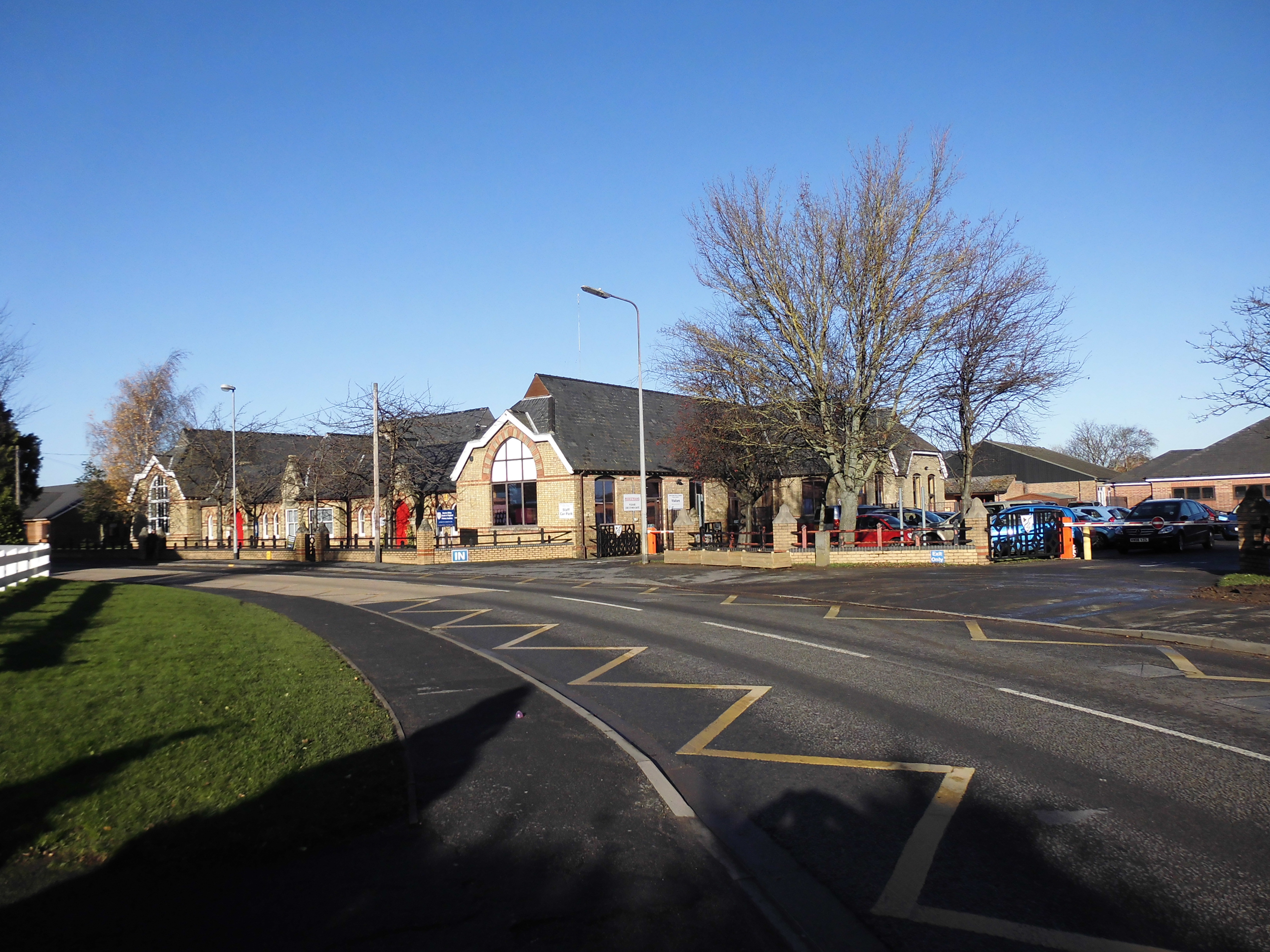
Star Lane School, Bourne

- Duncombe Street Wesleyan Methodist Chapel, Grimsby (1873). Decorative brickwork with arched windows. Demolished in 1935 to make way for the Methodist Central Hall.
- Star Lane School, Bourne (1876). Built for the Bourne School boards. The architect was Charles Bell of 4 Union Street, London and the contractors Messrs George and William Priest of Grantham at a cost of £3,727. Single storey building with projecting wings and central projection with the armorial of the School Board above the window, and two porches on either side. Gothic pointed windows with yellow and red brick. Red brick stringing. The school is now Bourne Abbey Church of England Primary Academy.
- Wesleyan Chapel, Mavis Enderby. (1877)

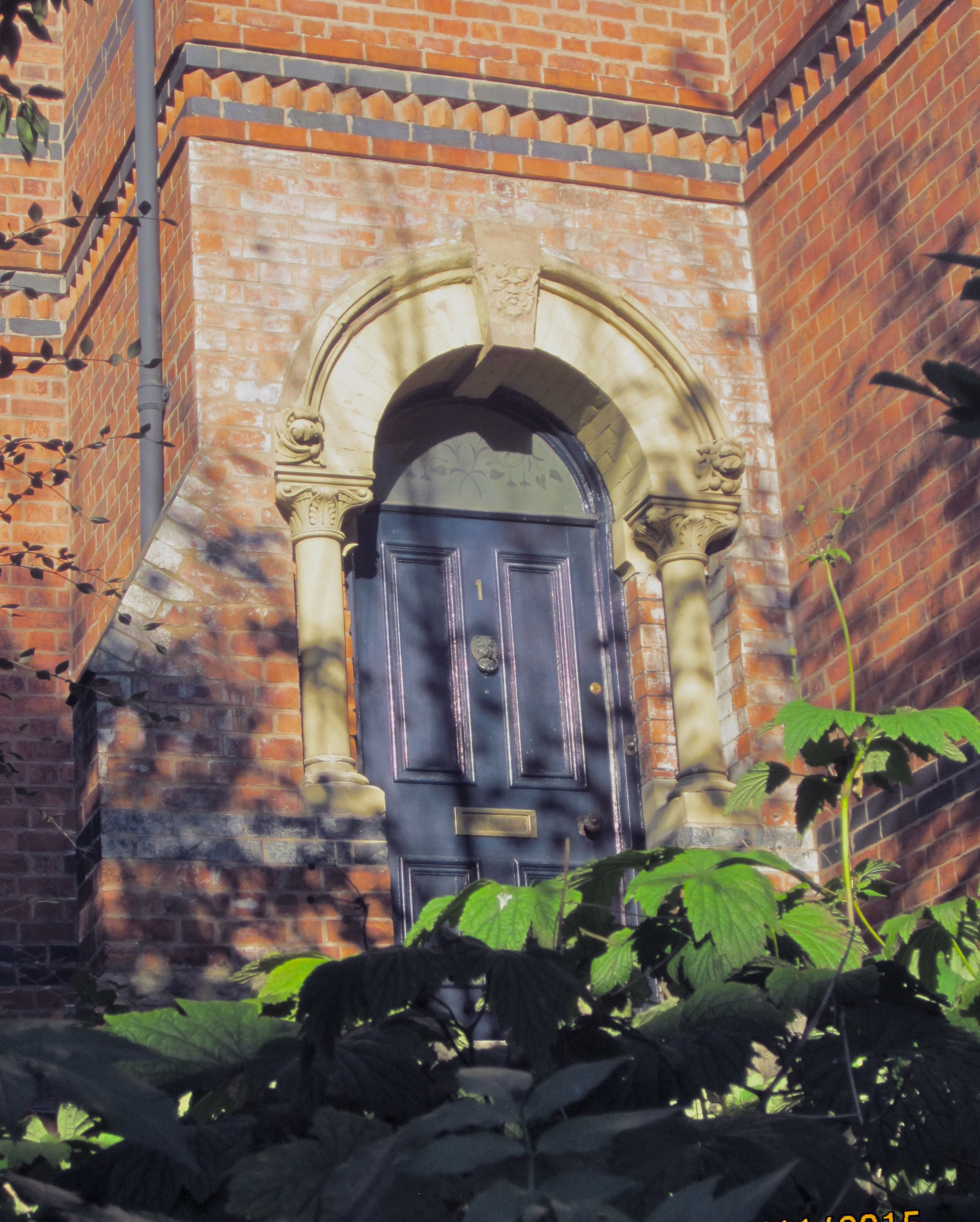
1 Temple Gardens Lincoln

- 1 Temple Garden, Lincoln. House designed by Charles Bell for Mrs Whelpton in 1877.
- Methodist Chapel, Spilsby. (1877–8). Described as stock brick with geometrical tracery and no tower. The two manses on either side of the Chapel were also designed by Bell.
- Methodist Chapel, Algitha Road, Skegness. (1881)
- The Liberal Club, Central Market Place. Grimsby.(1884) The building ceased as a Liberal Club in 1899. Possibly destroyed in Second World War.

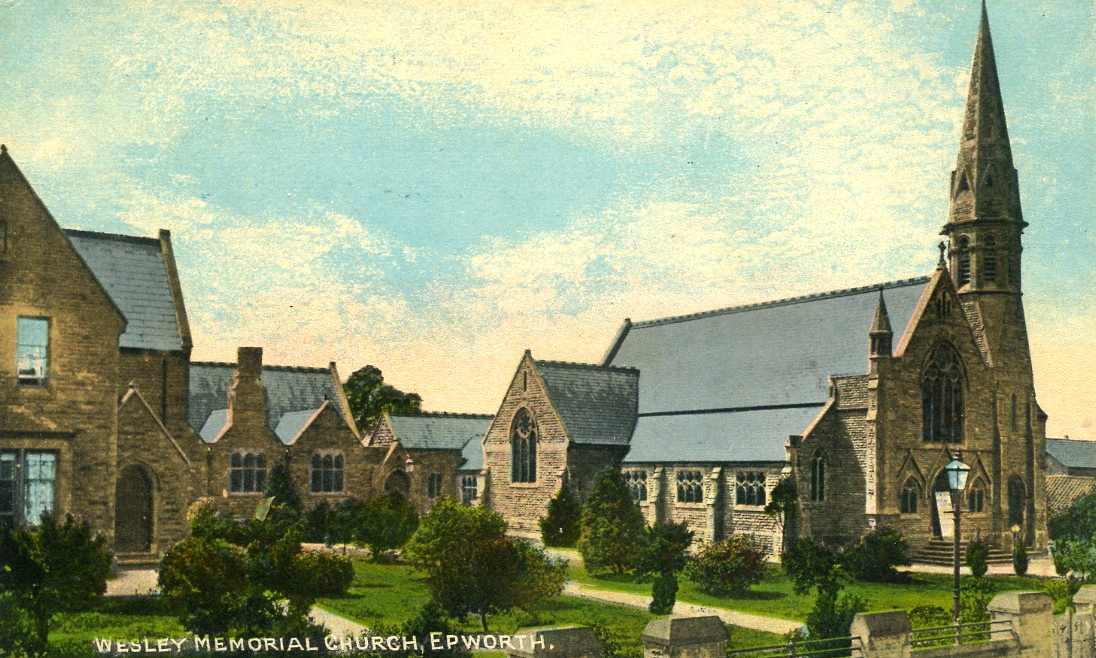
Wesley Memorial Chapel Epworth, c.1910

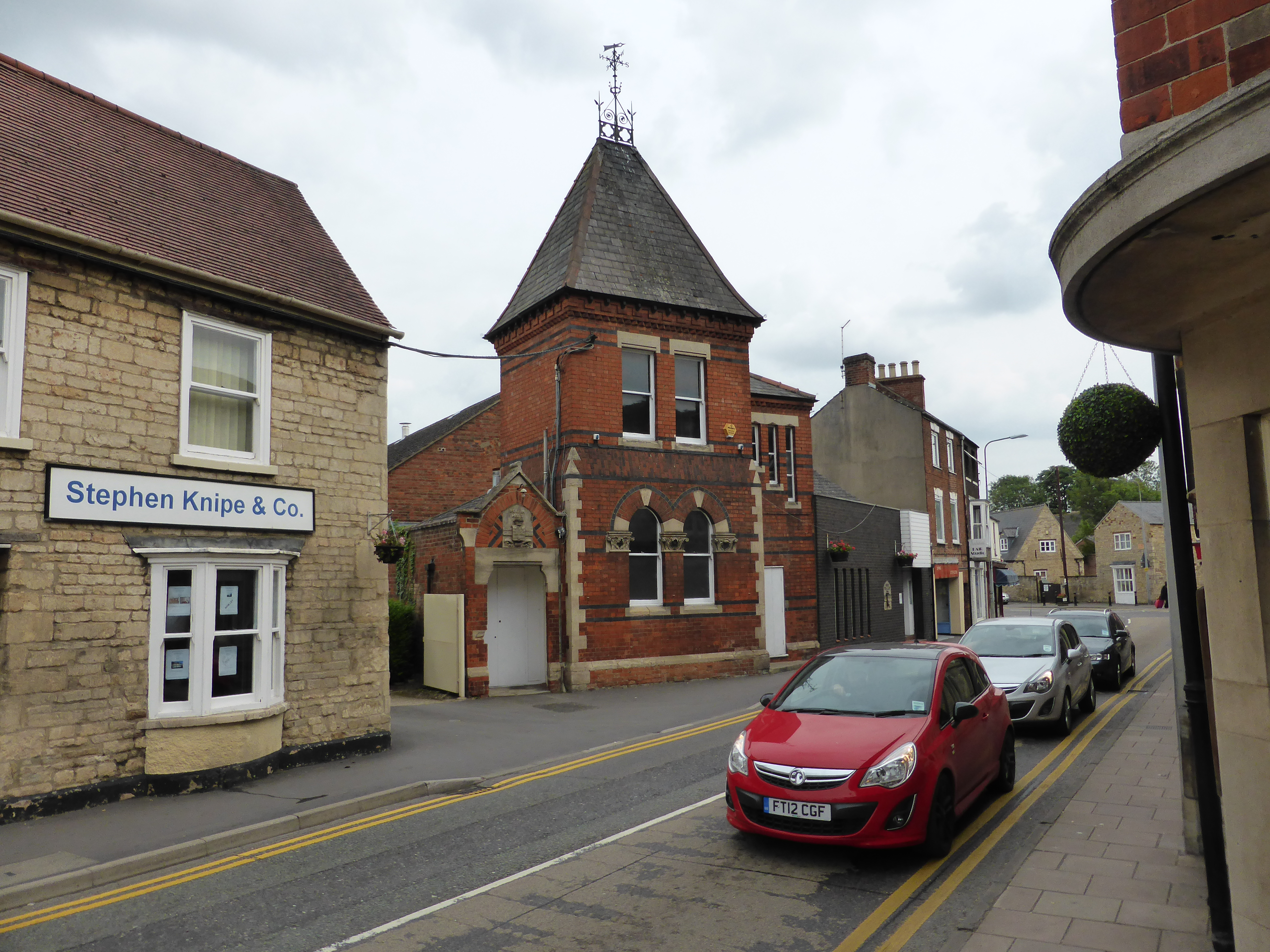
The Corn Exchange, Bourne, Lincolnshire, 1870

- The Wesley Memorial Church, School and Manse, Epworth (1888–9).
- The Wesleyan Church, St Catherine's, Lincoln.
- Bourne Corn Exchange, 3 Abbey Road. (1870). Built for the Bourne Public Hall and Corn Exchange Company Limited. The contract for the construction work went to Robert Young of Lincoln in May 1870, after his tender of £1,150 was accepted. The Corn Exchange was substantially extended and re-built in 1990.

== Sources ==
- Antram N (revised), Pevsner N & Harris J, (1989), The Buildings of England: Lincolnshire, Yale University Press.
- Antonia Brodie (ed), Directory of British Architects, 1834–1914: 2 Vols, British Architectural Library, Royal Institute of British Architects, 2001, Vol 1, pg. 154.
