= St Augustine's Hospital, Chartham =

St Augustine's Hospital
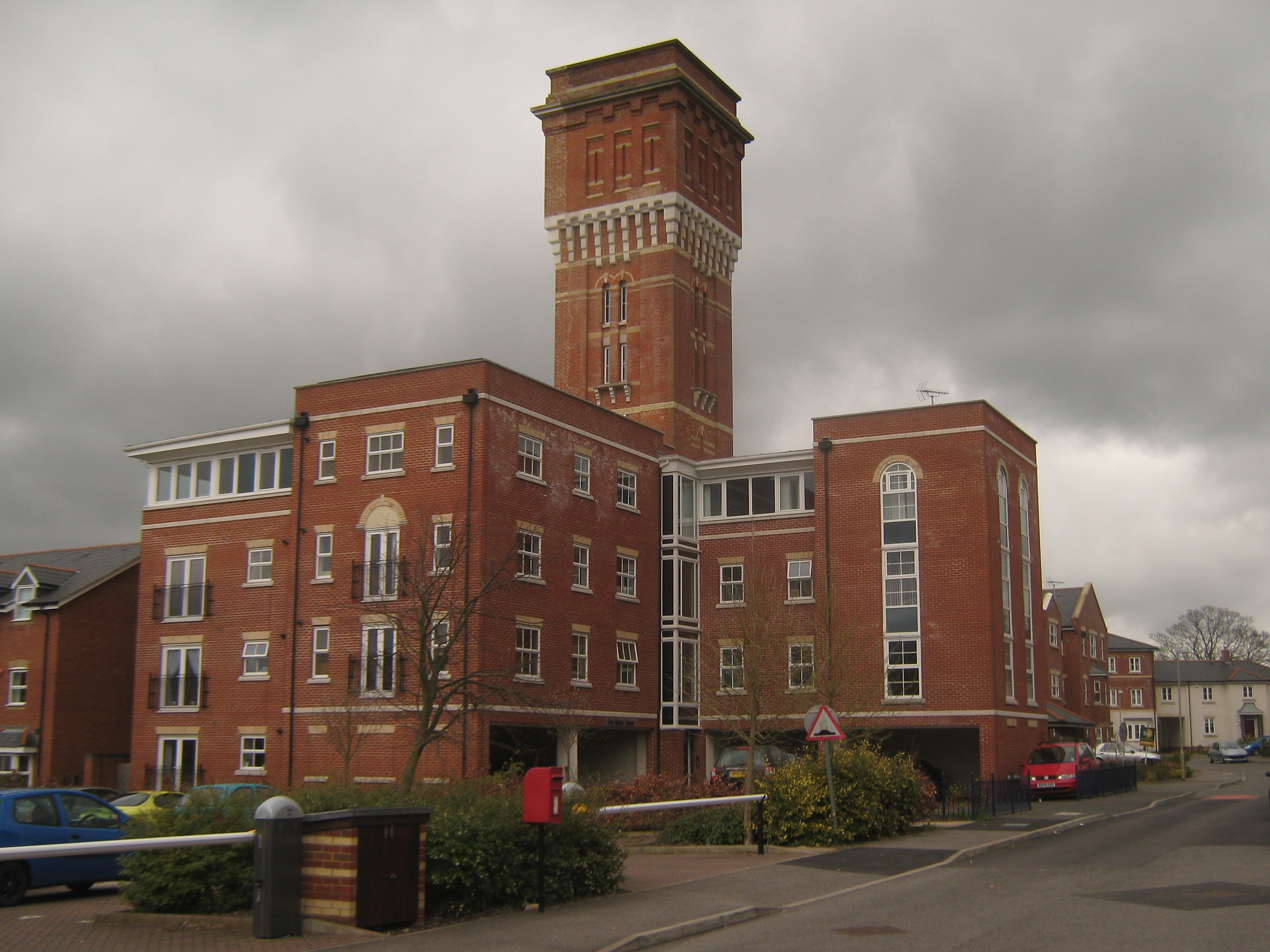
- St Augustine's Hospital

- Shown in Kent

Geography
- Location: Chartham, Kent, England, United Kingdom
- Coordinates: 51.245°N 1.035°E

Organisation
- Care system: Public NHS
- Type: Long-stay psychiatric

Services
- Emergency department: No Accident & Emergency

History
- Founded: 1875
- Closed: 1993

Links
- Lists: Hospitals in England

St Augustine's Hospital was a psychiatric hospital in Chartham, Kent, England. It was founded as the second, or East, Kent County Asylum in 1872. In 1948 the hospital became part of the National Health Service and was renamed St Augustine's Hospital. The hospital gained notoriety in the 1970s when it was the subject of a committee of inquiry into malpractice and mismanagement. St Augustine's Hospital closed in 1993 and the site is now occupied by housing, although a few of the original hospital buildings remain.

== History ==
=== Lunatic asylum ===
When it became clear in the early 1870s that the Kent County Asylum at Barming Heath, Maidstone, was no longer large enough to accommodate all the county's pauper lunatics, a search began for a site for a second county asylum as the 1845 Lunacy Act had made it obligatory to provide asylums. A 120-acre (49 ha) site on Chartham Downs three miles south-west of Canterbury was chosen. It satisfied the requirements set down by the Commissioners in Lunacy: a site on elevated ground with cheerful prospects and enough space to provide employment and recreation for inmates while preventing them being overlooked or disturbed by strangers.

The competition for the design of the buildings was won by the London firm of architects J. Giles and Gough. John Giles was one of the most successful asylum architects, winning eight of the sixteen competitions he entered and coming second in four. The buildings were completed in 1876 at a total cost of £211,852. Originally built to house 870 patients, the hospital gradually expanded and by 1948 had 300 acres, including a farm, and 73 staff residences, as well as new blocks and facilities for patients. Eventually there would be 2,000 patients.

Although the initial building programme was not completed until 1876, the first patients, all of them pauper lunatics from the Kent County Asylum at Barming Heath, had been able to move in the previous year. The first medical superintendent was Robert Spencer. The asylum was originally managed by a committee of quarter sessions, with responsibility passing to Kent County Council in 1889. In 1920 Kent County Mental Hospitals Committee took over the management and the asylum was renamed Kent County Mental Hospital, Chartham. The hospital became a self-contained village, with its own farm, workshops, baker, butcher, fire-brigade, church, graveyard, gasworks, cricket team, band, etc. Male patients worked on the farm, while female patients worked in the laundry or as seamstresses.

During the First World War, the asylum took in patients from other parts of the country, when their hospitals were being used for military casualties. After the end of the war they had a number of service patients (there were 37 in 1922), ex-servicemen who had special privileges. During the second world war, part of the hospital was taken over by the Emergency Medical Service for military use.

=== An NHS hospital ===
In 1948 the hospital became part of the newly formed National Health Service (NHS) and was renamed St Augustine's Hospital. Together with St Martin's Hospital (the former Canterbury borough asylum), St Augustine's became the responsibility of the Canterbury and Thanet Health Authority. New treatments such as electroconvulsive therapy and psychosurgery were used at the hospital. The hospital achieved a brief moment of fame in 1969 when a nurse, Barbara Bishop, was awarded an MBE after a daring rooftop rescue of a suicidal patient.

In 1972, when the hospital was under the leadership of medical superintendent John Ainslie, a post-doctorate researcher in chemistry called Brian Ankers (from the nearby University of Kent) obtained a temporary job as a nursing assistant. Ankers became concerned about the ill treatment of patients on the long-stay wards and, together with nurse Olleste Weston, took the matter up with the hospital authorities. Their concerns were dismissed, so they produced a detailed critique of the hospital, detailing 70 instances of abuse, neglect and degrading treatment of patients, thus forcing the health authority to set up an inquiry. The inquiry, chaired by J. Hampden Inskip, upheld the majority of the complaints and was critical of senior doctors, nurses, and administrators, but stopped short of advising disciplinary action against any staff. The hospital was particularly criticised for its casual use of electroconvulsive therapy.

=== Closure and redevelopment ===
St Augustine's Hospital was closed in 1993 as part of the community care programme. In 1997 development of the site for housing was begun. A few of the hospital buildings, including the administration block, the water tower, and the chapel, were retained but the rest were demolished. Although Canterbury City Council suggested that "a change of name would help in creating a new sense of identity", the site is known as St Augustine's Estate.
