= Rivercourt Methodist Church =

Church in London, England

Coordinates: 51.49277°N 0.23609°W

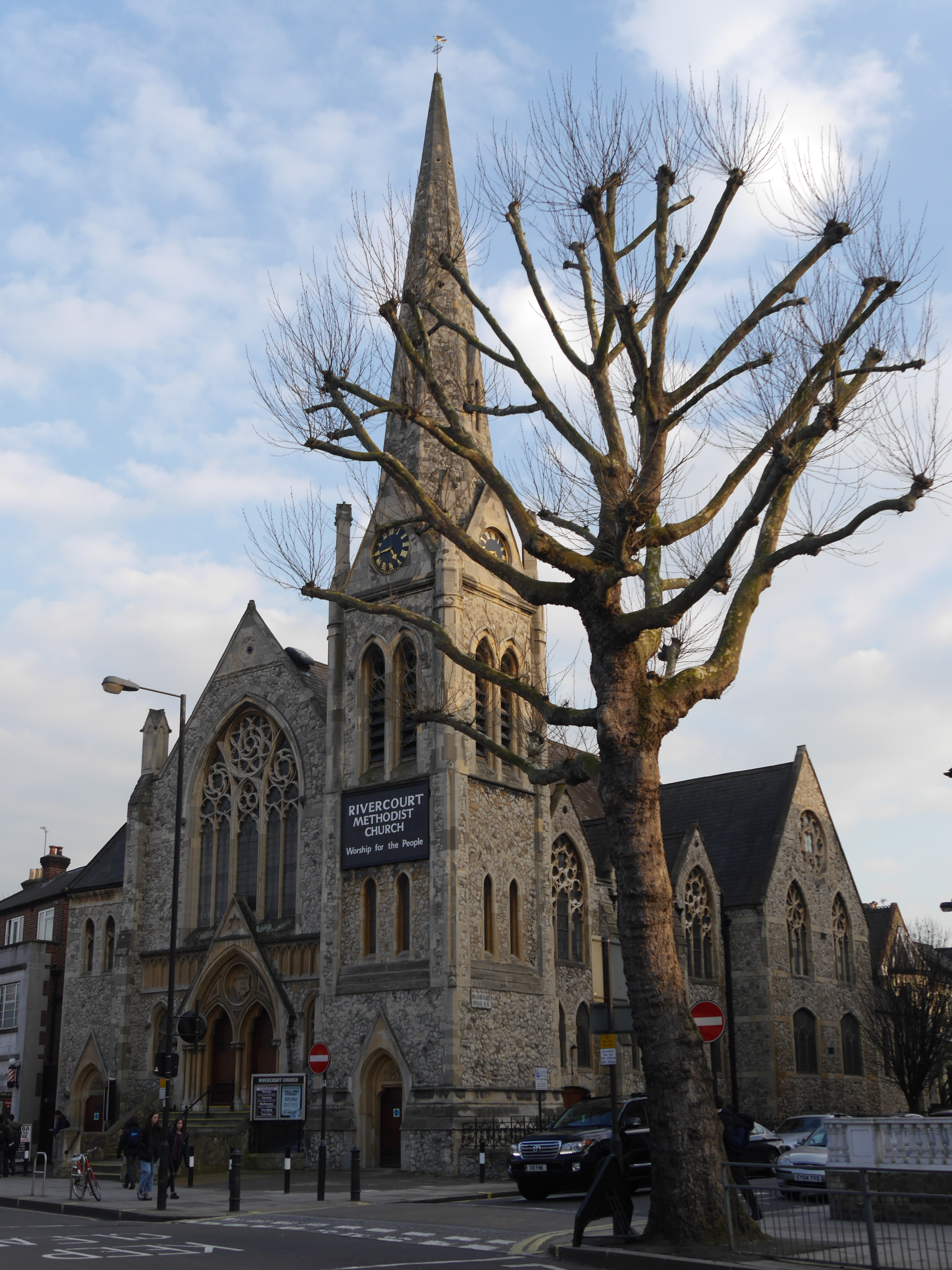
- Rivercourt Methodist Church
- Denomination: Methodism
- Website: Official website

Architecture
- Architect: Charles Bell
- Completed: 1875

Rivercourt Methodist Church is a church in King Street, Hammersmith, London.

It was built in 1875 by the architect Charles Bell.

== Historical events and services ==
- April 1914: The church hosted the wedding of solicitor Lewis Walter Taylor (of the firm Lewis W. Taylor & Co. of Hammersmith Broadway and Gray's Inn to Dora Patterson, the daughter of Kew Palace clerk of works George Dobson Patterson. The judge, legal theorist and Liberal Party campaigner Heber Hart KC served as the best man for the ceremony.
- May 1925: The church celebrated its Golden Jubilee with a four-day renovation fund bazaar. The opening day was officiated by The Hon Laura Rank, wife of J. Arthur Rank and daughter of Lord Marshall. The second day was re-opened by Lucy Baldwin, wife of the Prime Minister Stanley Baldwin, with Sir Kingsley Wood, MP, presiding. The event was welcomed by the Mayor of Hammersmith Marshall Hays and concluded with a vote of thanks proposed by Sir William Bull MP and seconded by Lewis W. Taylor.
