= Wesley Memorial Church, Oxford =

Wesley Memorial Church
- Wesley Memorial Methodist Church
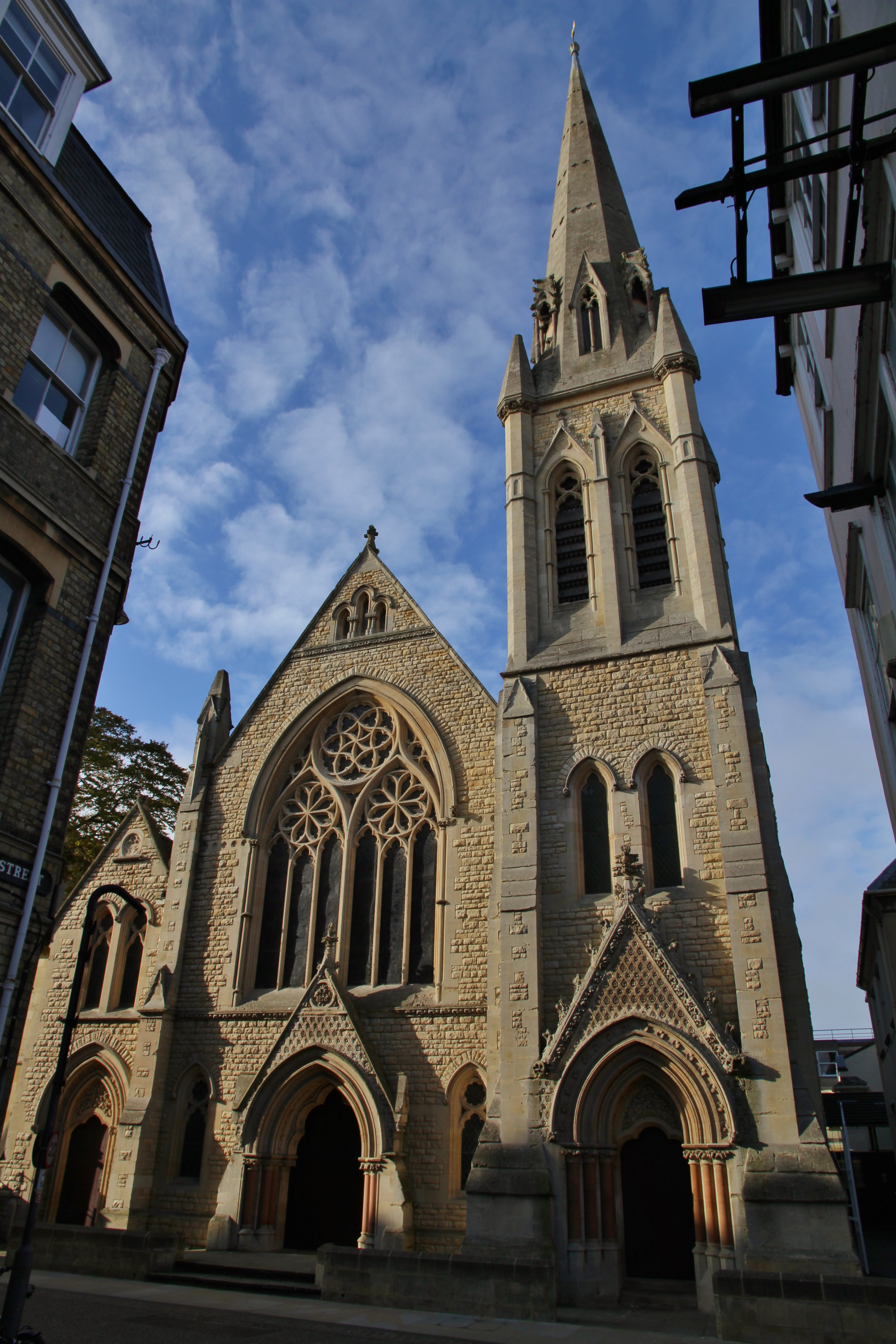
- East front of the church, showing the steeple
- Wesley Memorial Church
- 51°45′11″N 1°15′39″W
- OS grid reference: SP 51123 06310
- Location: New Inn Hall Street; Oxford
- Country: England
- Denomination: Methodist Church of Great Britain

Architecture
- Functional status: Active
- Architect: Charles Bell
- Style: English Gothic/Gothic Revival
- Years built: 1877–78 (by Joshua Symm)

Administration
- District: Northampton

Wesley Memorial Church is a Methodist church in central Oxford, England. John and Charles Wesley studied in Oxford, and the congregation was founded in 1783. The present church building was completed in 1878. The building is now a focus for various social activities as well as Christian worship.

== History ==
Oxford's first Methodist meeting house was a building on the east side of New Inn Hall Street. It is now numbered 32–34 and is part of Brasenose College. A plaque on the wall commemorates the fact that John Wesley preached there on 4 July 1783.

=== New Inn Hall Street Chapel 1818–1878 ===
In 1815 Oxford Methodists started to plan and raise funds and support for a chapel to be built in the centre of Oxford. A plot on New Inn Hall Street was purchased from Daniel Harris in 1817, and the chapel, designed by William Jenkins, was opened on 19 February 1818.

The society (congregation) later moved to the current building, constructed in front of the chapel, when it was opened in 1878, although the chapel continued in use as a teaching space until it was sold to St Peter's College in the 1930s. The building was demolished in 1969.

=== Current building ===
The present Gothic Revival building was started in 1877 and opened in October 1878. The architect Charles Bell designed it in a revival of Decorated Gothic. The building contractor was Joshua Symm. Henry Frith of Gloucester carved the capitals of the columns, which portray twelve different kinds of English plants.

== Activities ==
The buildings are used for a number of groups and activities which have connections with the church.

=== Rainbow House ===
A family drop-in centre has been running in the building since 1st May 1985 It is open 3 days a week for accompanied pre-school children during term-time, offering toys, books, climbing frame and inexpensive snacks and lunches.

=== Oxford Winter Night Shelter ===
Wesley Memorial is part of a group of churches who provide temporary overnight accommodation for rough sleepers who are referred via St Mungo's, during the months of January, February and March.

== Gallery ==
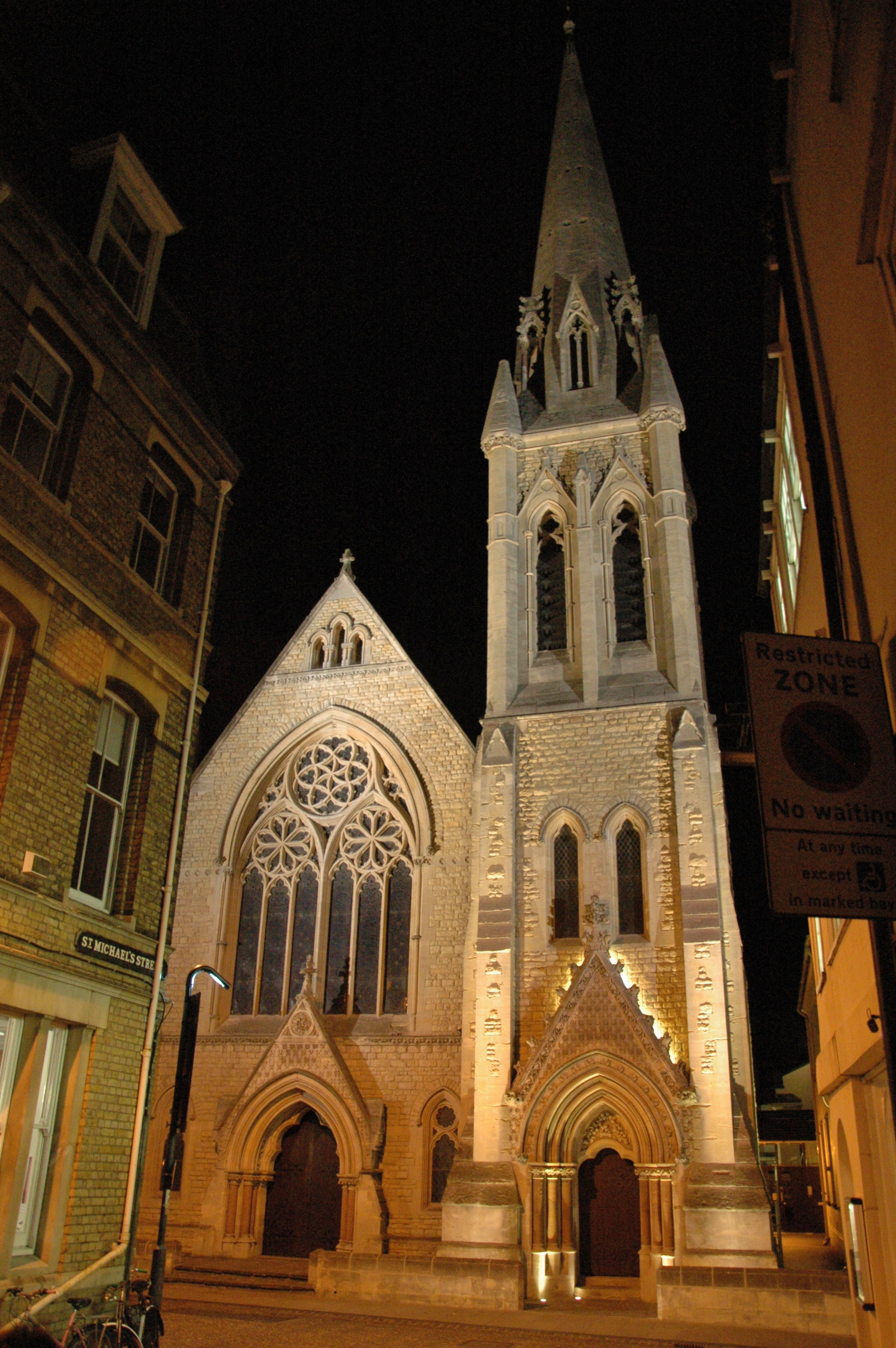
The east front by night, showing the Gothic Revival tracery of the east window

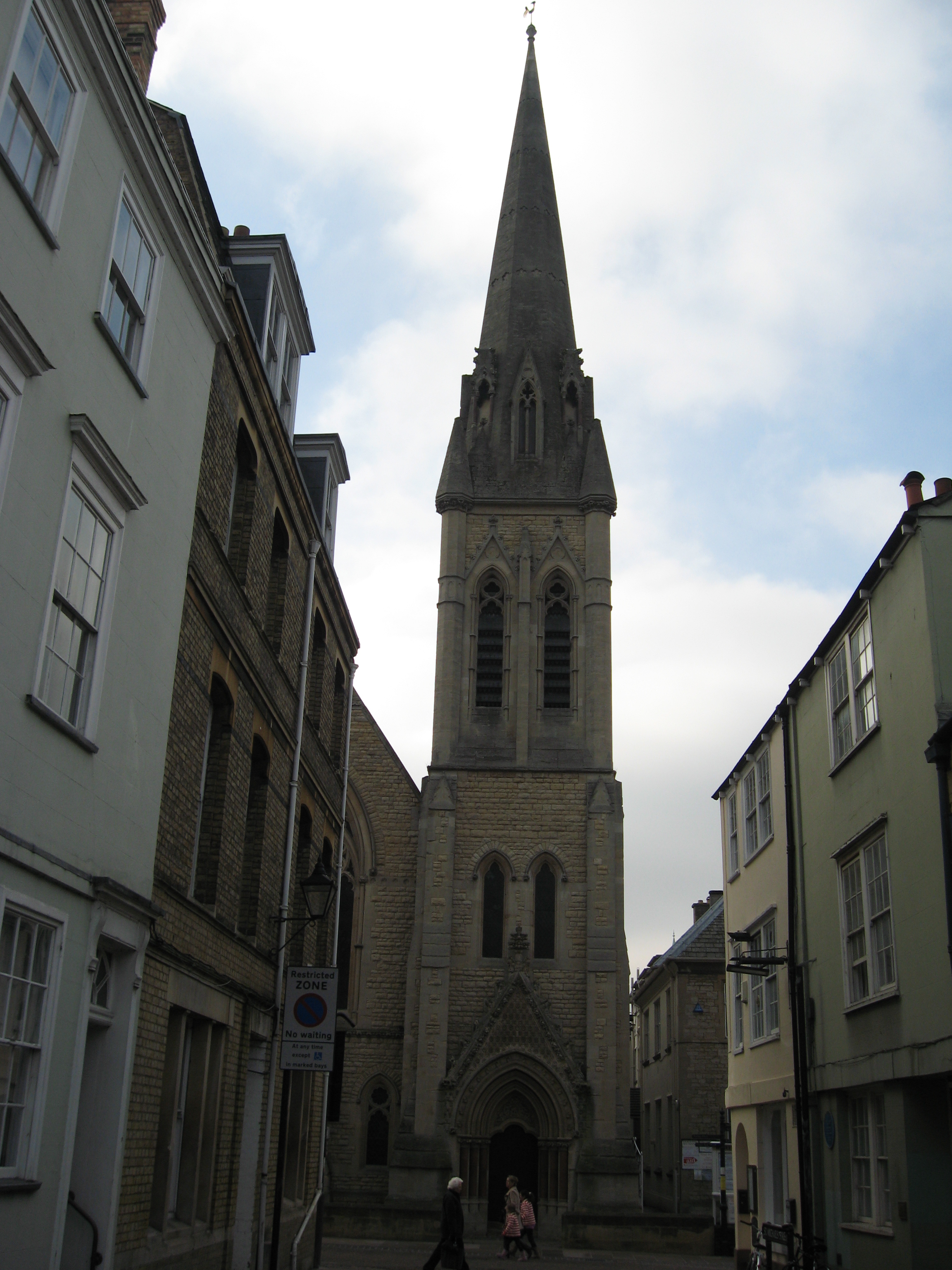
Church tower, pictured from St Michael's Street

== Sources ==
- Hibbert, Christopher, ed. (1988). "Wesley Memorial Methodist Church". The Encyclopaedia of Oxford. London: Macmillan. p. 495. ISBN 0-333-39917-X.
- Sherwood, Jennifer; Pevsner, Nikolaus (1974). Oxfordshire. The Buildings of England. Harmondsworth: Penguin Books. ISBN 0-14-071045-0.
