= Stratford Town Hall =

Municipal building in London, England

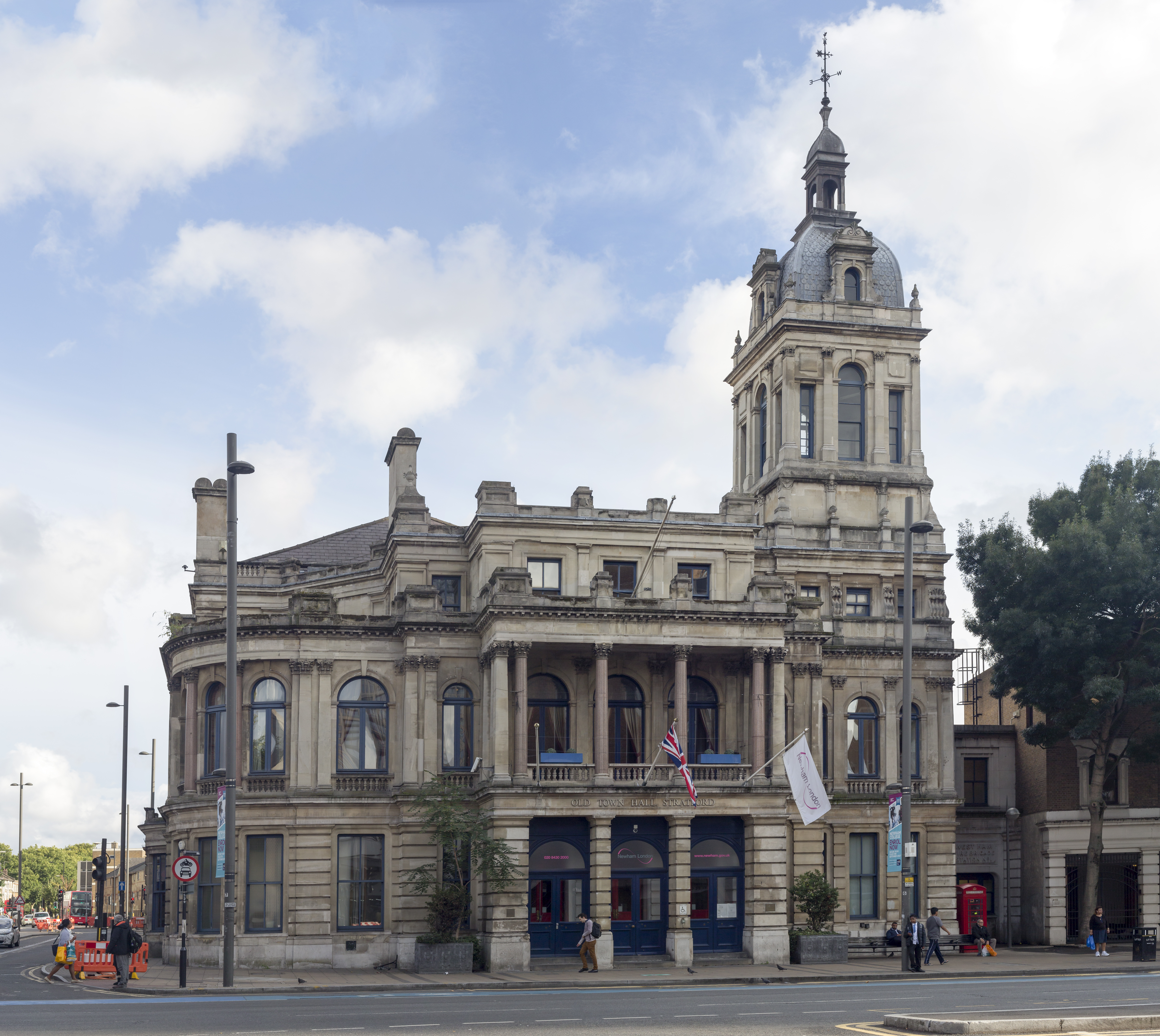
- Stratford Town Hall

- Shown in Newham
- 51.5405°N 0.0019°E
- Location: Broadway, Stratford

History
- Built: 1869

Site notes
- Architect(s): John Giles and Lewis Angell
- Architectural style: Italianate style

Listed Building – Grade II
- Designated: 6 November 1974
- Reference no.: 1080991

Stratford Town Hall is a municipal building in Stratford, London. It is a Grade II listed building.

== History ==
In the mid-19th century the West Ham Local Board of Health had met at Rokeby House in Broadway. Following a rapid growth in the local population caused by industrial expansion, civic leaders decided to procure purpose-built council offices: the site chosen for the new building was a plot of open land on the corner of Broadway and West Ham Lane.

The new building, which was designed by Lewis Angell and John Giles in the Italianate style was completed in 1869. The design involved an asymmetrical main frontage with eleven bays facing onto Broadway; the central section of three bays featured a full-height portico with rounded-headed doorways flanked by Doric order banded columns on the ground floor and round-headed windows flanked by Corinthian order columns on the first floor. The left hand section curved round into West Ham Lane and the right handed section involved a square tower with a cupola and weather vane which was 30.5 metres (100 ft) high. The principal rooms included a council chamber and an assembly hall which was elaborately decorated by the French designer, Mons Boekbinder. The design of the building was described by the Illustrated London News, in 1869, as the "finest building in Essex" and by Pevsner, in 1973, as a "debased arched cinquecento".

The foundation stone for an extension along West Ham Lane was laid by the chairman of the local board, George Rivett, in 1885; the extension, which was also designed by Lewis Angell, was intended to accommodate a courthouse and cells. The building became the headquarters of the new Municipal Borough of West Ham in 1886 and, after becoming the centre of administration for the County Borough of West Ham in 1889, it became the home of the first Labour Party municipal administration in 1898.

The town hall continued to be the home of the county borough for much of the 20th century but ceased to be the local seat of government after the formation of the London Borough of Newham in April 1965. It continued to serve as an events and concert venue and performers included the band, The Who, in May 1965. It also served as offices for the education department of Newham council until a major fire broke out causing considerable damage on 26 June 1982. It was restored to the designs of the borough architect, Kenneth Lund, and was re-opened by Queen Elizabeth II as a conference centre on 16 July 1986.
