= Heber Hart =

Heber Leonidas Hart KC (31 March 1865 – 4 February 1948) was an English judge and jurist, particularly noted as an authority on banking law.

== Early life ==
Born in Clapham, South London, Hart was privately educated before enrolling in law at the University of London, from which he graduated in 1886 with a first-class degree.

== Legal career ==
In 1887, Hart was called to the bar of the Middle Temple, where he was made a Bencher in 1923, and Treasurer in 1937. In 1890, Hart acted as junior counsel alongside future judges Charles Swinfen Eady and Arthur Jelf in a successful lawsuit brought by the Putney Burial Board. The team secured a High Court injunction from Mr Justice Romer restricting dangerous volunteer rifle range practice next to Putney Vale Cemetery on Wimbledon Common. In 1895, Hart also argued in court against future League of Nations architect Lord Robert Cecil, who was representing the opposing volunteer regiments. He specialised in commercial law and, in 1895, published The Law Relating to Auctions; in 1904 he published The Law of Banking (with three reprints: 1906, 1914 and 1931). He wrote polemics against women's suffrage. He was made a King's Counsel in 1913, and Recorder of Ipswich in 1915.

In 1920 Hart was appointed as the British member of the Anglo-German, Anglo-Austrian, Anglo-Bulgarian, and Anglo-Hungarian Mixed Arbitral Tribunals, which had been established as part of the peace treaties at the end of the First World War. The tribunals would resolve cases between British subjects and those from the defeated states, "in circumstances where the legal effects of war would otherwise have denied redress to either side". Heber's role with the tribunals ran until their closure in 1931. In 1939, Hart published his memoirs, Reminiscences and Reflections; he also wrote a critique of the English judicial system, The Way to Justice: a Primer of Legal Reform, which was published in 1941. In the latter book, he wrote that "our legal system is grievously at fault", and that it "may be the worst in western Europe".

== Politics ==
A member of the Liberal Party, Hart stood unsuccessfully as a parliamentary candidate for the Isle of Thanet in 1892, Islington South in 1895 and Windsor in 1910.

=== Liberal Imperialism ===
During the Boer War (1899–1902), Hart organised the "Liberal Imperialist" faction, which supported the war against the party's anti-war faction. He proposed a dedicated Liberal Imperialist club to fellow Eighty Club members John Saxon Mills and E. T. Slater. The Imperial Liberal Council (ILC) held its inaugural general meeting on 10 April 1900, which was attended by prominent Liberal figures including Robert Perks MP, Cecil Harmsworth, and Sir Martin Conway.

During the 1900 "Khaki" General Election, Hart published official lists of ILC-approved parliamentary candidates in The Times with the first list published on 25th September.

== Personal life ==
He lived in one of a pair of houses named The Pines on Putney Hill. Next door lived the poet Algernon Charles Swinburne.

Hart maintained close personal and professional connections within London's legal community. In April 1914, he acted as the best man at the Hammersmith wedding of Gray's Inn solicitor Lewis Walter Taylor of Lewis W. Taylor & Co. to Dora Patterson of Kew at Rivercourt Methodist Church.

Hart died of heart disease at his home in Putney, south-west London on 4 February 1948. He was cremated at Putney Vale Cemetery, where his ashes were also interred.

== Sources ==
- Lentin, Anthony (2004). "Hart, Heber Leonidas". Oxford Dictionary of National Biography (online ed.). Oxford University Press. doi:10.1093/ref:odnb/49386. (Subscription, Wikipedia Library access or UK public library membership required.)
- "Hart, Heber Leonidas". Hart, Heber Leonidas, (Died 4 Feb. 1948). Who Was Who. London: A & C Black. April 2014. doi:10.1093/ww/9780199540884.013.U226524.
