= Albert Estcourt =

English builder and stonemason (1832–1909)

- Born: 4 May 1832; Painswick, Gloucestershire
- Died: 18 February 1909 (aged 76–77); Gloucester
- Occupation: Builder
- Known for: Constructing: Hillfield House (1867–69); Clouds House (1881–86)

Albert Estcourt (4 May 1832 – 18 February 1909) was an English builder and stonemason in the 19th century who, with his brother, and later on his own, constructed a number of notable buildings in Gloucestershire and across southern England.

Some of his buildings are Hillfield House in Gloucester (1867–1869), now grade II listed; major restoration work at St Mary's Church, Cheltenham (1877); the Oxford University Cricket Club Pavilion (the Parks Pavilion) to a design by Thomas Graham Jackson (1880–1881); and Clouds House in Wiltshire (1881–1886).

== Early life and family ==
Albert Estcourt was born in Painswick, Gloucestershire, on 4 May 1832 to William and Maria Estcourt. He was christened on 27 May 1832 at Painswick. The 1851 census shows him as a stone mason, lodging at St Mary's Square in Gloucester with the publican Joseph Gardner. In the 1861 census he was in Painswick with his wife Ellen.

== Career ==
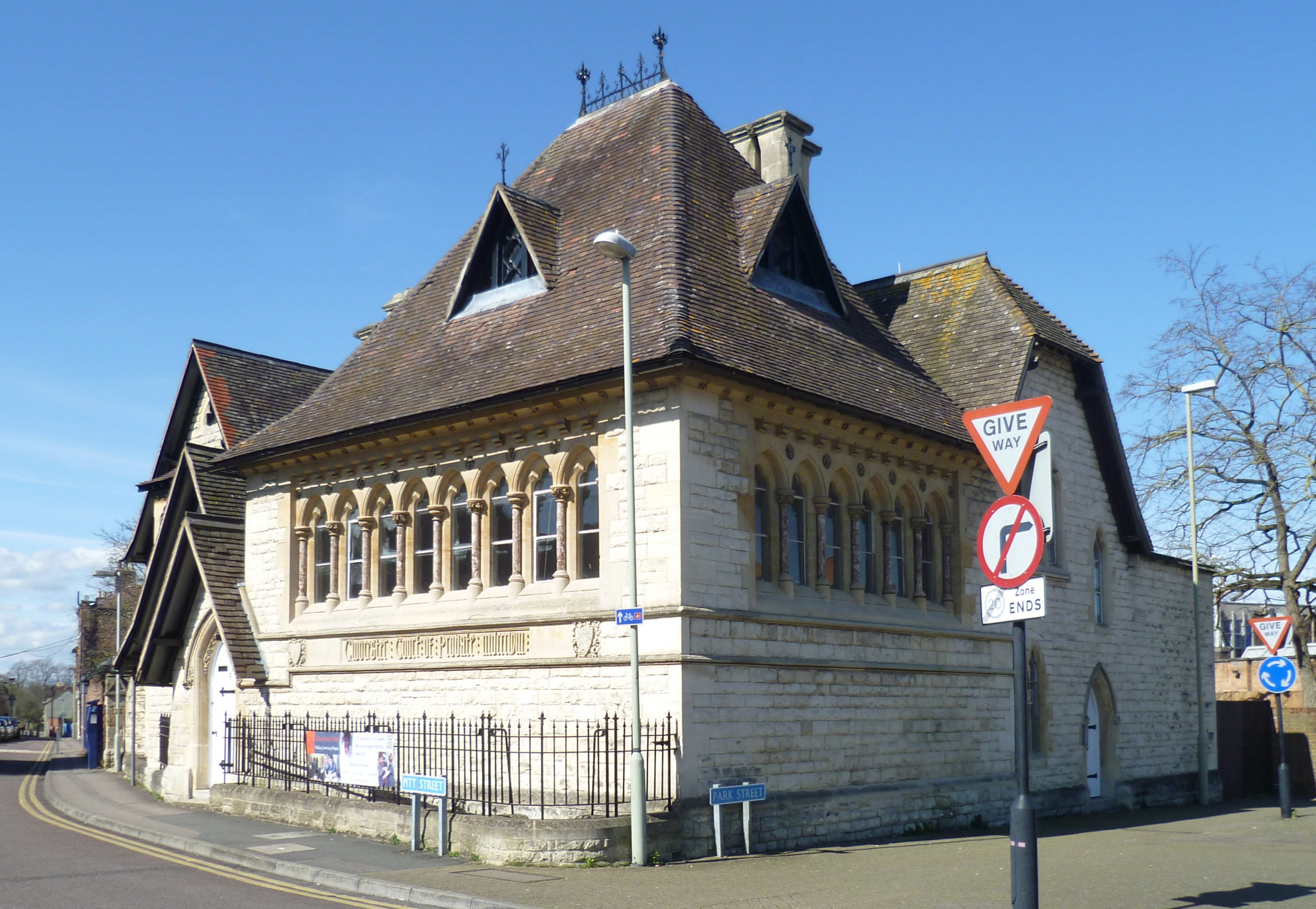
The former Gloucester Court of Probate, built by Oliver Estcourt in 1858

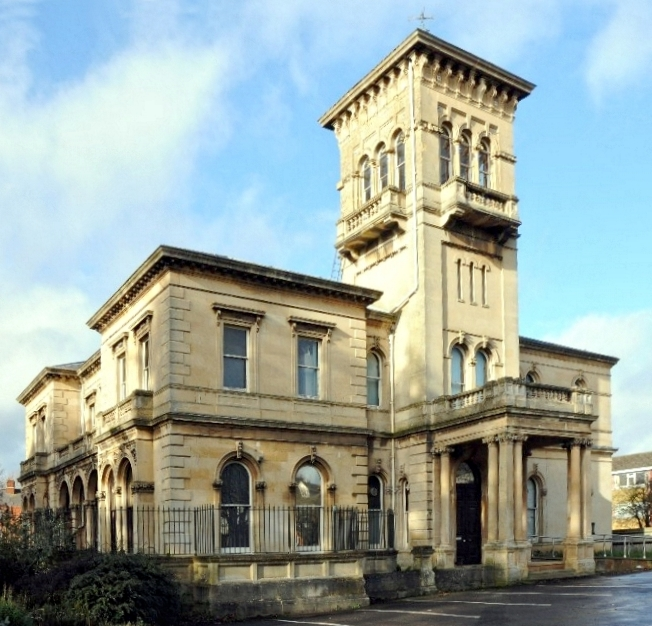
Hillfield House, Gloucester, built by Albert Estcourt, 1867–1869

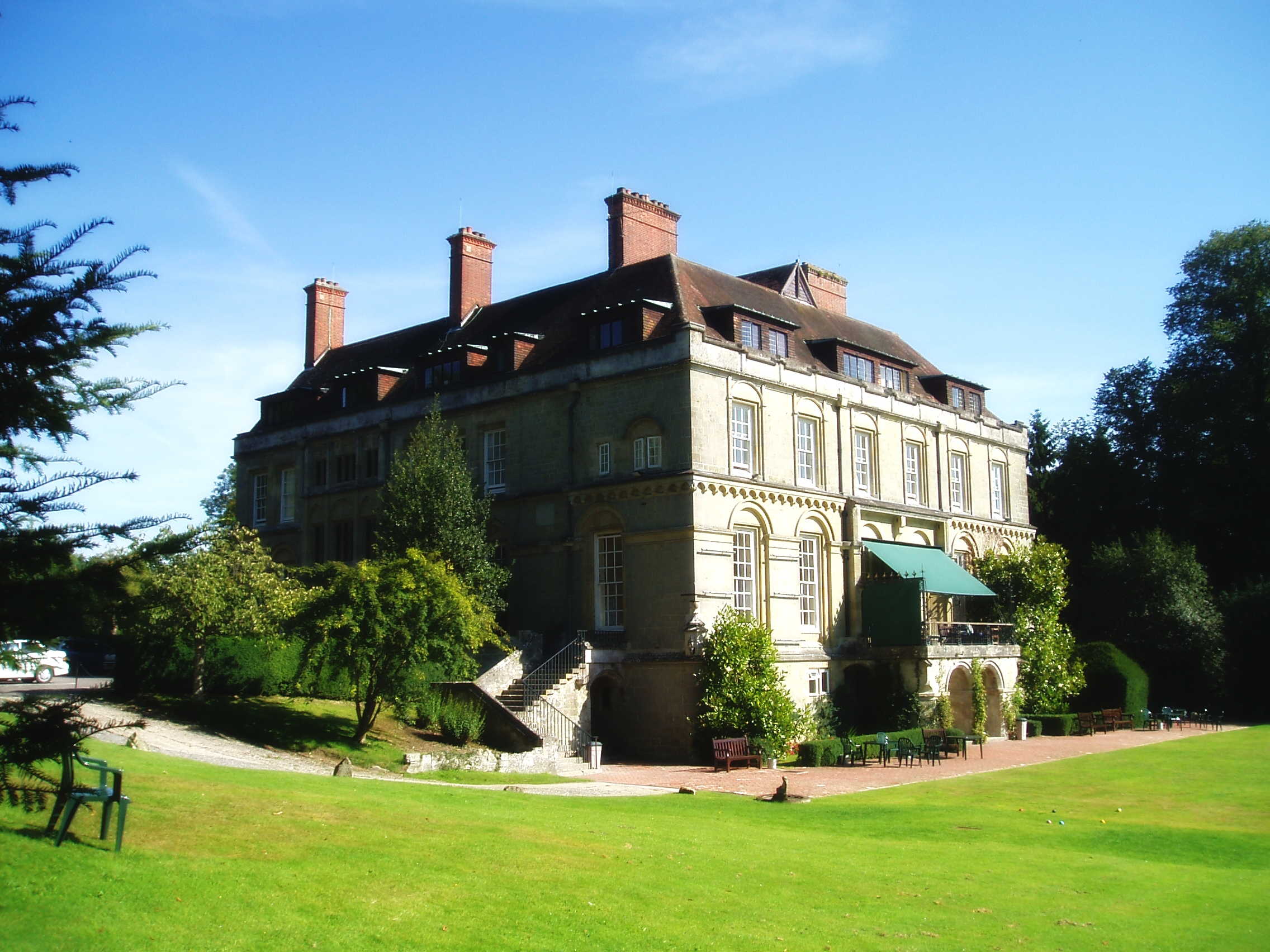
Clouds House, Wiltshire, built by Albert Estcourt, 1881–1886 (shown after reconstruction following a fire)

Albert Estcourt was at first in partnership with his brother Oliver Estcourt, who died in 1871. Oliver was responsible for the construction in 1858 of the grade II listed Gloucester Court of Probate by Thomas Fulljames of Fulljames & Waller.

Estcourt worked with leading architects on buildings throughout Gloucestershire and across southern England. His works include Hillfield House in Gloucester (1867–69) to a design by John Giles for the timber merchant Charles Walker, now grade II listed and described as the "most elaborate Victorian house in Gloucester"; major restoration work at St Mary's Church, Cheltenham (1877); and in 1880–1881 the Oxford University Cricket Club Pavilion (the Parks Pavilion) to a design by Thomas Graham Jackson.

A major work was the construction in 1881–1886 of Clouds House in Wiltshire, now grade II* listed with Historic England.

== Personal life ==
Estcourt married Ellen Parker Wotton Under Edge in October 1859 who was born at Coaley. At the time of the 1871 census he was living in South Hamlet, on the southern edges of Gloucester, with Ellen, four children and one servant. He was described as a "builders manager". In the 1881 and 1891 censuses, he and his wife were recorded as living in Barton Street in Gloucester with seven children and two servants.

In 1897, he owned the Middletown estate in Upleadon which he sold in 1898.

== Death and legacy ==
Estcourt died on 18 February 1909. His address at the time of his death was Falkland House, Denmark Road, Gloucester. He left an estate of £55,987 and probate was granted to George Oliver Estcourt, builder, and Charles William Estcourt, timber merchant. The Escourts are remembered in Estcourt Road, Gloucester, built in the 1930s near Albert's home in Denmark Road.
