= Parish =

Ecclesiastical subdivision of a diocese

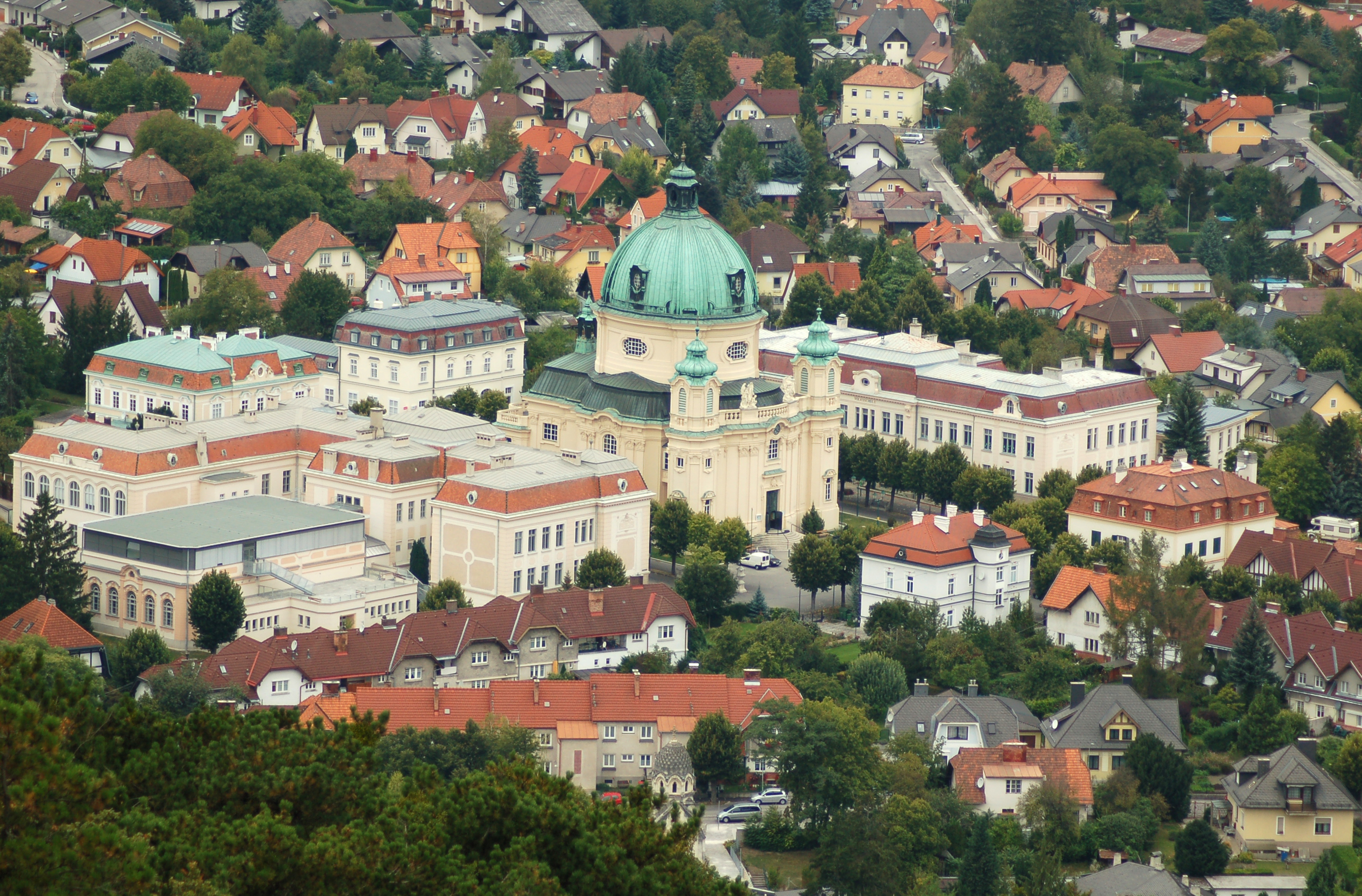
St Margarete Parish Church, Berndorf, Lower Austria

A parish is a territorial entity in many Christian denominations, constituting a division within a diocese. A parish is under the pastoral care and clerical jurisdiction of a priest acting as pastor or "parish priest", who might be assisted by one or more curates. The parish community meets for worship and support in its parish church. In England, a parish historically often covered the same geographical area as a manor. Its association with the parish church remains paramount.

By extension the term parish refers not only to the territorial entity but to the people of its community or congregation as well as to church property within it. In England this church property was technically in ownership of the parish priest ex officio, vested in him on his institution to that parish.

== Etymology and use ==
First attested in English in the late 13th century, the word parish comes from the Old French paroisse, in turn from Latin: paroecia, the Romanisation of the Ancient Greek: παροικία, romanized: paroikia, "sojourning in a foreign land", itself from πάροικος (paroikos), "dwelling beside, stranger, sojourner", which is a compound of παρά (pará), "beside, by, near" and οἶκος (oîkos), "house".

As an ancient concept, the term "parish" occurs in the long-established Christian denominations: Catholic, Anglican Communion, the Eastern Orthodox Church, and Lutheran churches, and in some Methodist, Congregationalist, Baptist, and Presbyterian administrations.

The eighth Archbishop of Canterbury Theodore of Tarsus (c. 602–690) appended the parish structure to the Anglo-Saxon township unit, where it existed, and where minsters catered to the surrounding district.

== Territorial structure ==
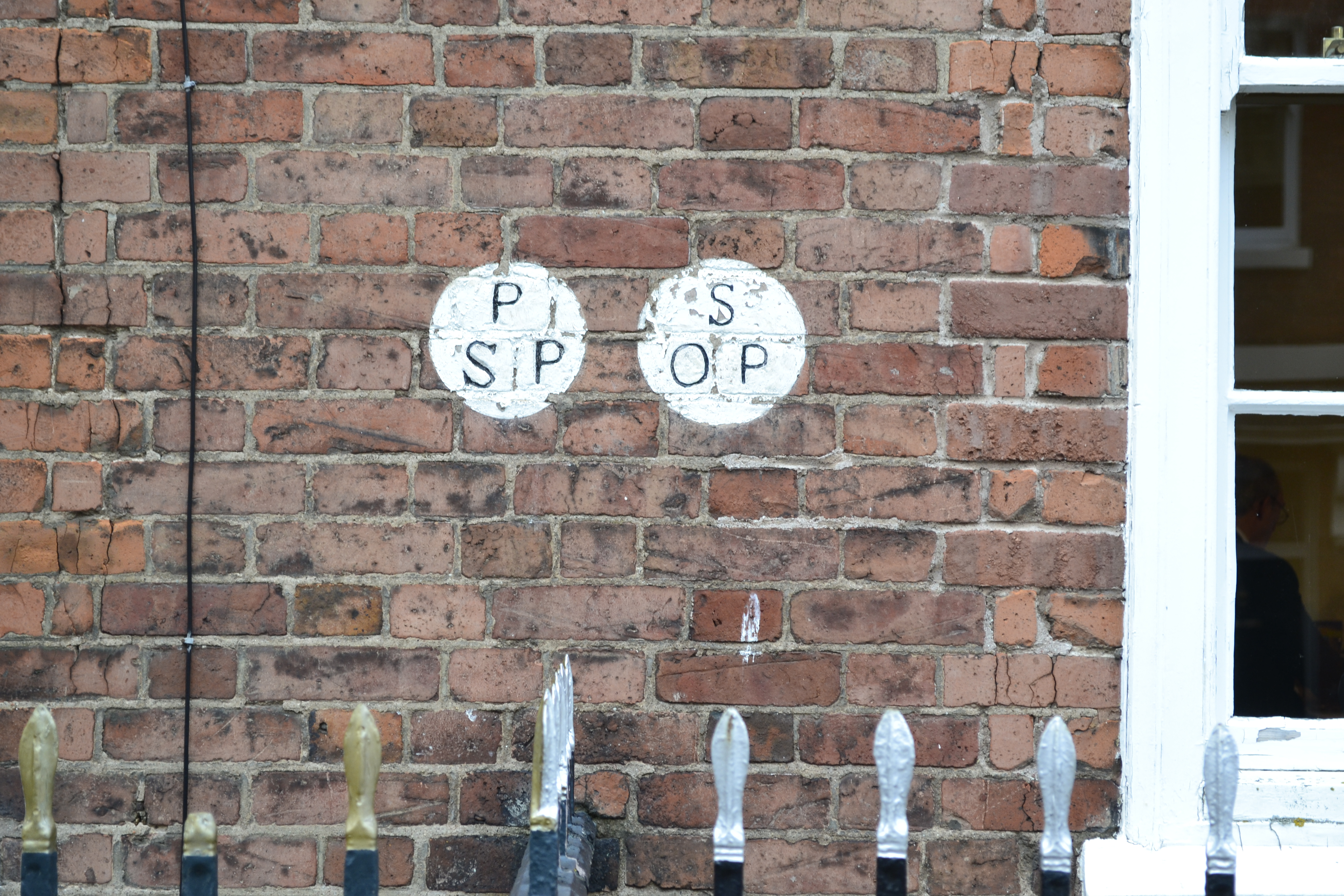
Parish boundary markers for St Peter's and St Owen's in Hereford

Broadly speaking, the parish is the standard unit in episcopal polity of church administration, although parts of a parish may be subdivided as a chapelry, with a chapel of ease or filial church serving as the local place of worship in cases of difficulty to access the main parish church.

In the wider picture of ecclesiastical polity, a parish comprises a division of a diocese or see. Parishes within a diocese may be grouped into a deanery or vicariate forane (or simply vicariate), overseen by a dean or vicar forane, or in some cases by an archpriest. Some churches of the Anglican Communion have deaneries as units of an archdeaconry.

=== Outstations ===
An outstation is a newly created congregation, a term usually used where the church is evangelical, or a mission and particularly in African countries, but also historically in Australia. They exist mostly within the Catholic and Anglican parishes.

The Anglican Diocese of Cameroon describes their outstations as the result of outreach work "initiated, sponsored and supervised by the mother parishes". Once there is a big enough group of worshippers in the same place, the outstation is named by the bishop of the diocese. They are run by "catechists/evangelists" or lay readers, and supervised by the creator parish or archdeaconry.

Outstations are not self-supporting, and in poor areas often consist of a very simple structure. The parish priest visits as often as possible. If and when the community has grown enough, the outstation may become a parish and have a parish priest assigned to it.

== Catholic Church ==
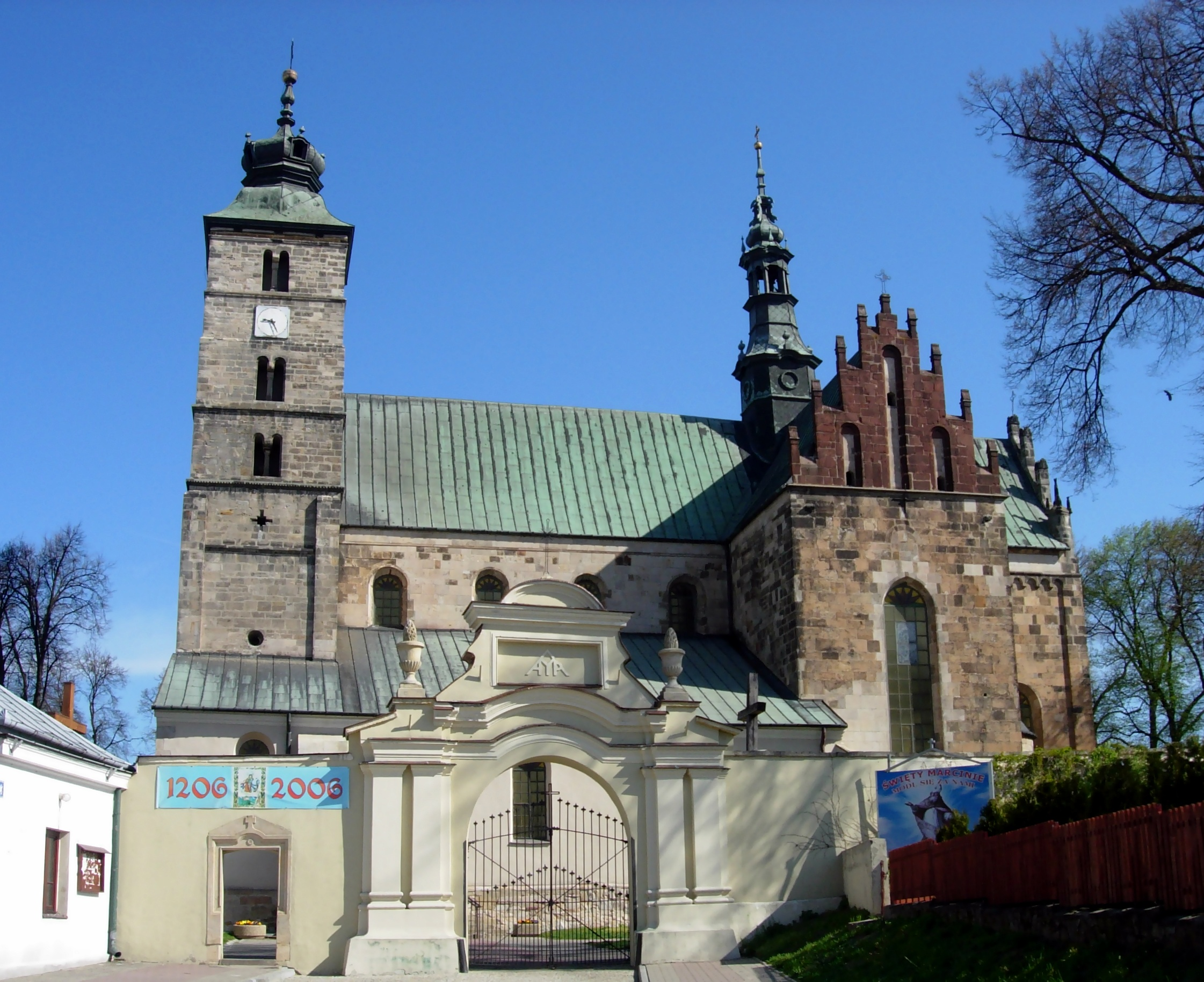
Saint Martin's Collegiate Parish Church in Opatów, Poland

In the Catholic Church, each parish normally has its own parish priest (in some countries called pastor or provost), who has responsibility and canonical authority over the parish.

What in most English-speaking countries is termed the "parish priest" is referred to as the "pastor" in the United States, where the term "parish priest" is used of any priest assigned to a parish even in a subordinate capacity. These are called "assistant priests", "parochial vicars", "curates", or, in the United States, "associate pastors" and "assistant pastors".

Each diocese (administrative region) is divided into parishes, each with their own central church called the parish church, where religious services take place. Some larger parishes or parishes that have been combined under one parish priest may have two or more such churches, or the parish may be responsible for chapels (or chapels of ease) located at some distance from the mother church for the convenience of distant parishioners. In addition to a parish church, each parish may maintain auxiliary organizations and their facilities such as a rectory, parish hall, parochial school, or convent, frequently located on the same campus or adjacent to the church. Part of the parish is the oratory (also called a patronage, parish center, or youth center), a location that is designated for the youth ministry of the Catholic Church and also a youth gathering place with facilities such as music rooms and football pitches.

Normally, a parish comprises all Catholics living within its geographically defined area, but non-territorial parishes can also be established within a defined area on a personal basis for Catholics belonging to a particular rite, language, nationality, or community. An example is that of personal parishes established in accordance with the 7 July 2007 motu proprio Summorum Pontificum for those attached to the pre-Vatican II liturgy.

== Lutheran Churches ==
In countries with a national Lutheran Church heritage, parishes (Swedish: socken or församling) are territorial, meaning that they include the people living within its boundaries. At the end of the 19th century, the Church of Sweden possessed 2,000 parishes. In the United Kingdom, the wider regions served by Lutheran churches are referred to as "church service areas".

== Anglican Churches ==
=== Church of England ===
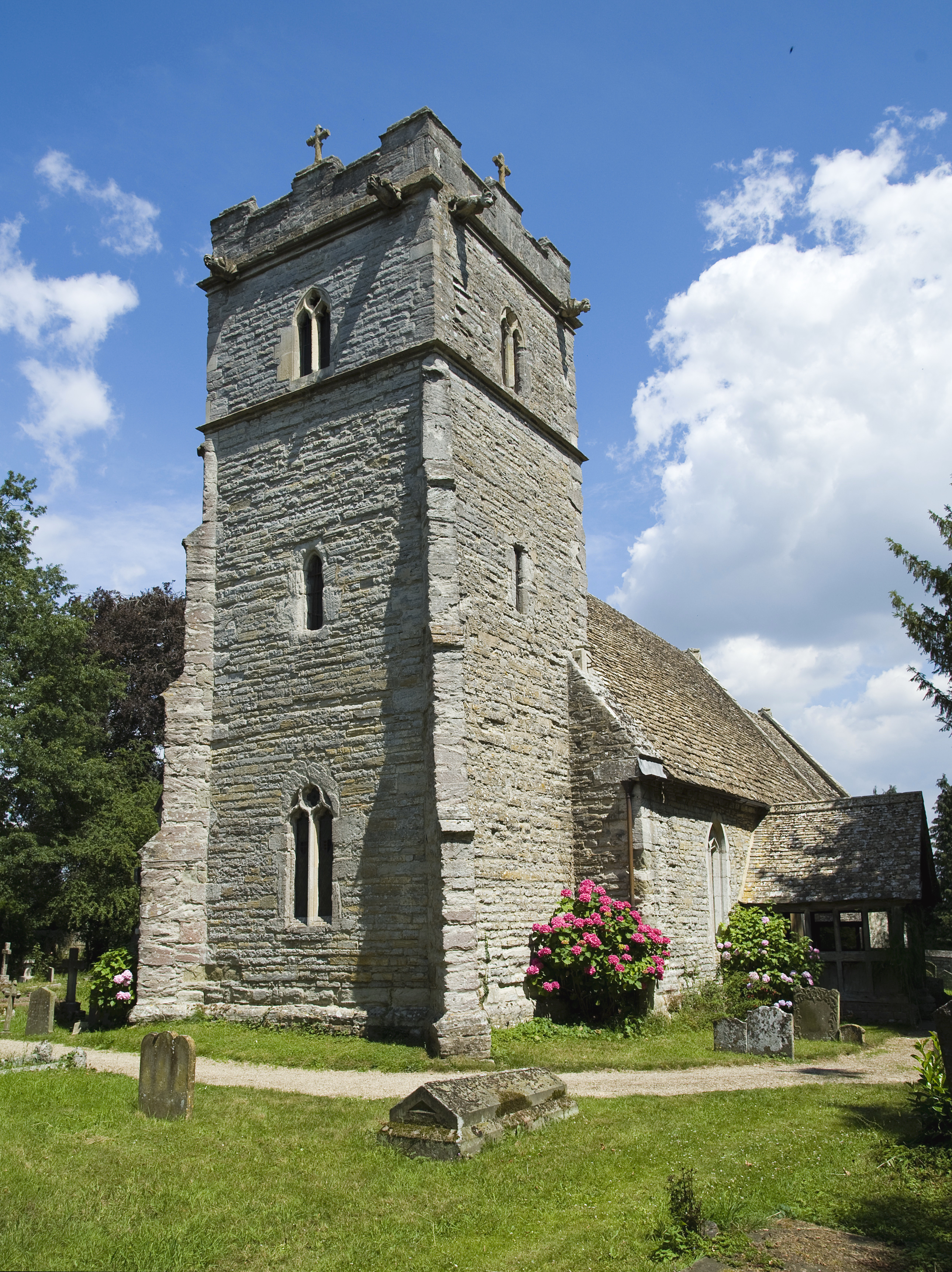
St Mary's parish church in Hasfield, Gloucestershire

The Church of England's geographical structure uses the local parish church as its basic unit. The parish system survived the Reformation with the Anglican Church's secession from Rome remaining largely untouched; thus, it shares its roots with the Catholic Church's system described above. Parishes may extend into different counties or hundreds and historically many parishes comprised extra outlying portions in addition to its principal district, usually being described as 'detached' and intermixed with the lands of other parishes. Church of England parishes nowadays all lie within one of 42 dioceses divided between the provinces of Canterbury, 30 and York, 12.

Each parish normally has its own parish priest (either a vicar or rector, owing to the vagaries of the feudal tithe system: rectories usually having had greater income) and perhaps supported by one or more curates or deacons—although as a result of ecclesiastical pluralism some parish priests might have held more than one parish living, placing a curate in charge of those where they did not reside. Now, however, it is common for a number of neighbouring parishes to be placed under one benefice in the charge of a priest who conducts services by rotation, with additional services being provided by lay readers or other non-ordained members of the church community.

A chapelry was a subdivision of an ecclesiastical parish in England, and parts of Lowland Scotland up to the mid 19th century. It had a similar status to a township but was so named as it had a chapel which acted as a subsidiary place of worship to the main parish church.

In England civil parishes and their governing parish councils evolved in the 19th century as ecclesiastical parishes began to be relieved of what became considered to be civic responsibilities. Thus their boundaries began to diverge. The word "parish" acquired a secular usage. Since 1895, a parish council elected by public vote or a (civil) parish meeting administers a civil parish and is formally recognised as the level of local government below a district council.

The traditional structure of the Church of England with the parish as the basic unit has been exported to other countries and churches throughout the Anglican Communion and Commonwealth but does not necessarily continue to be administered in the same way.

=== Church in Wales ===
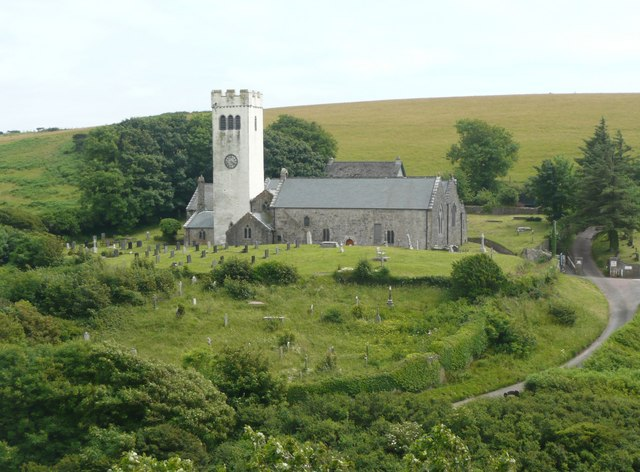
St James's church in Manorbier, Pembrokeshire, is a parish church dating from the 12th century and is a Grade I listed building

The Church in Wales was disestablished in 1920 and is made up of six dioceses. It retained the parish system and parishes were also civil administration areas until communities were established in 1974, but did not necessarily share the same boundaries. The reduction in the numbers of worshippers, and the increasing costs of maintaining often ancient buildings, led over time to parish reorganisation, parish groupings and Rectorial Benefices (merged parishes led by a Rector).

In 2010, the Church in Wales engaged the Rt Rev Richard Harries (Lord Harries of Pentregarth), a former Church of England Bishop of Oxford; Prof Charles Handy; and Prof Patricia Peattie, to carry out a review into the organisation of the Church and make recommendations as to its future shape. The group published its report ("Church in Wales Review") in July 2012 and proposed that parishes should be reorganised into larger Ministry Areas (Ardaloedd Gweinidogaeth). It stated that "the parish system, as originally set up ... is no longer sustainable" and suggested that the Ministry Areas should each have a leadership team containing lay people as well as clergy, following the principles of "collaborative ministry". Over the next decade, the six dioceses all implemented the report, with the final Ministry Areas being instituted in 2022. In the Diocese of Saint Asaph (Llanelwy), they are known as Mission Areas (Ardaloedd Cenhadaeth).

== Presbyterian Churches ==
=== Church of Scotland ===
The parish is also the basic level of church administration in the Church of Scotland. Spiritual oversight of each parish church in Scotland is responsibility of the congregation's Kirk Session. Patronage was regulated in 1711 (Patronage Act) and abolished in 1874, with the result that ministers must be elected by members of the congregation. Many parish churches in Scotland today are "linked" with neighbouring parish churches served by a single minister. Since the abolition of parishes as a unit of civil government in Scotland in 1929, Scottish parishes have purely ecclesiastical significance and the boundaries may be adjusted by the local Presbytery.

== Methodist Church ==
In the United Methodist Church congregations are called parishes, though they are more often simply called congregations and have no geographic boundaries. A prominent example of this usage comes in The Book of Discipline of The United Methodist Church, in which the committee of every local congregation that handles staff support is referred to as the committee on Pastor-Parish Relations. This committee gives recommendations to the bishop on behalf of the parish/congregation since it is the United Methodist Bishop of the episcopal area who appoints a pastor to each congregation. The same is true in the African Methodist Episcopal Church and the Christian Methodist Episcopal Church.

In New Zealand, a local grouping of Methodist churches that share one or more ministers (which in the United Kingdom would be called a circuit) is referred to as a parish.

== See also ==
- Parish church
- Parish pump
- Parish registers: Birth certificate, Marriage certificate, Death certificate
- Collegiate church
- Priory church
- Cathedral
- Parochial school
