= Thomas Fulljames (surveyor) =

British surveyor (died 1847)

Thomas Fulljames (died 1847) was a land surveyor in Gloucestershire, lord of the manor, and justice of the peace.

== Family ==
Fulljames was the son of Thomas Fulljames, a Kent schoolteacher. He had a brother, Trophimus Fulljames, who also became a land surveyor, and a sister Harriet who married advantageously to James Wintle.

In 1797, he married Sophia Greaves in Hayes, Kent. The couple had no children. His nephew was the architect also named Thomas Fulljames.

== Career ==
Fulljames developed a successful practice in Gloucestershire from the 1790s. By 1800, he was farming in Ashleworth where he was also lord of the manor. In 1806, he purchased Hasfield Court and by 1826 had expanded the estate to 200 acres. In 1844, he purchased the Hasfield manor estate and with it land in Corse and Ashleworth.

He served as a justice of the peace in the counties of Gloucestershire and Worcestershire.

== Death ==
Fulljames died in 1847.
