= The King's School, Gloucester =

Coordinates: 51°52′4″N 2°14′40″W

The King's School

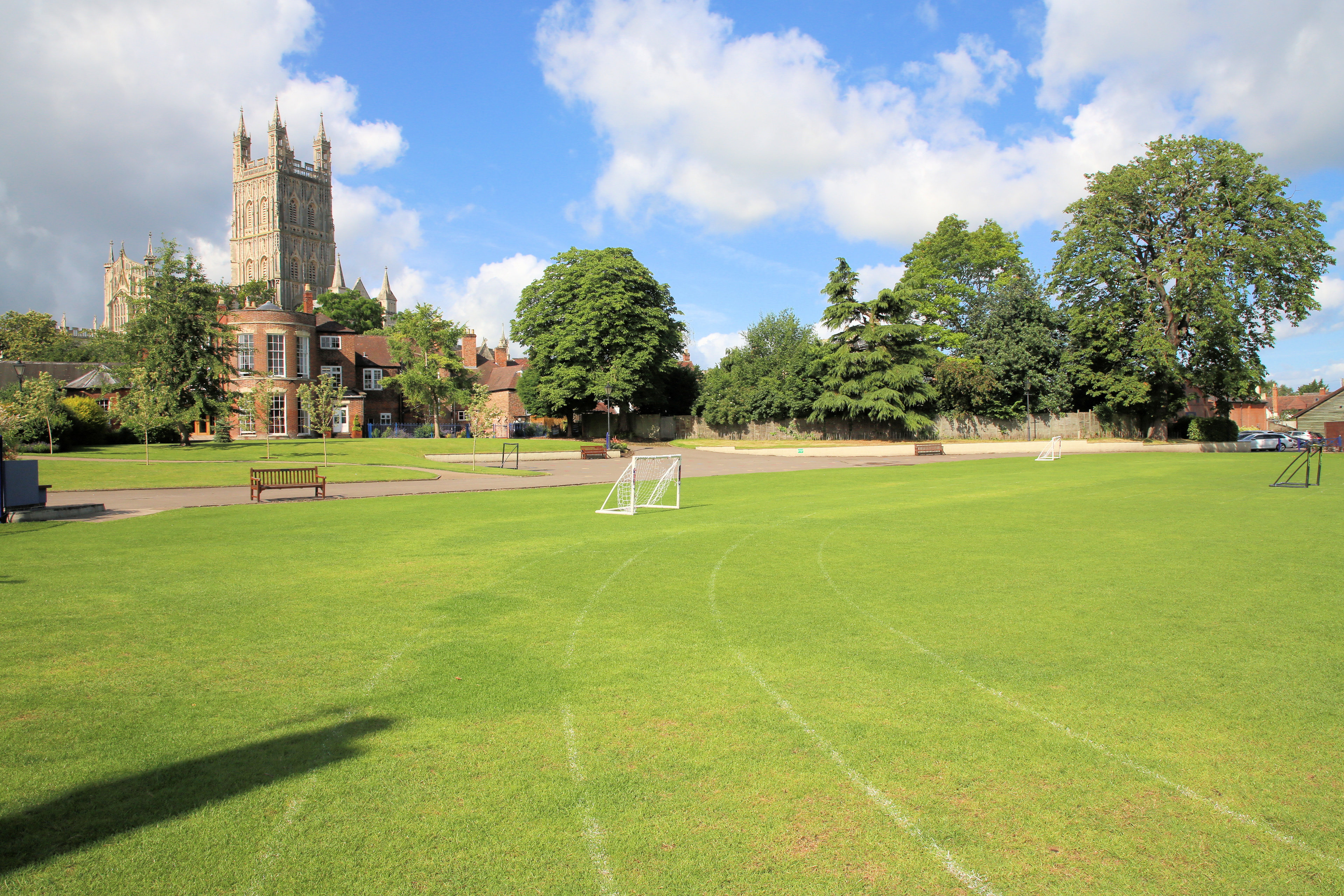

Location
- Pitt Street; Gloucester, Gloucestershire, GL1 2BG; England

Information
- Type: Private day school Cathedral school
- Religious affiliation: Church of England
- Established: c.12th century 1541; 485 years ago
- Local authority: Gloucestershire
- Department for Education URN: 115780 Tables
- Headmaster: David Morton
- Gender: Co-educational
- Age: 3 to 18
- Enrolment: 750
- Website: thekingsschool.co.uk

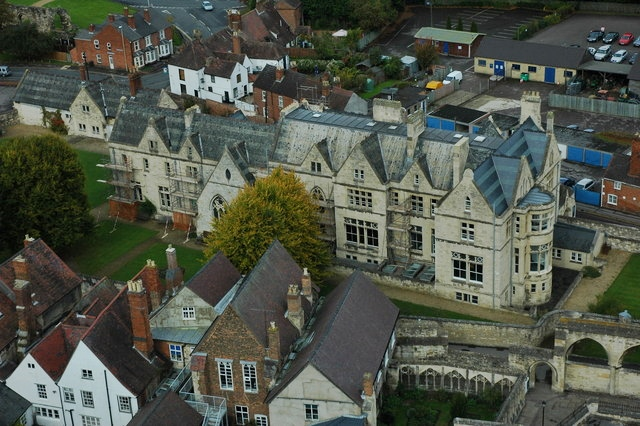
King's School, Gloucester

The King's School is a co-educational private day school in Gloucester, in the county of Gloucestershire, in South West England. It traces its heritage to a monastic school founded in the 11th century in the cloisters of Gloucester Cathedral. It became one of seven 'King's Schools' established, or re-endowed by King Henry VIII in 1541 after the Dissolution of the Monasteries.

== History ==
The current school was officially founded in 1541 as a direct consequence of the English Reformation, when Gloucester Cathedral was established. However, education had been an important part of the work of the cathedral's predecessor, the Benedictine Abbey of St Peter. When Abbot Serlo arrived in Gloucester in 1072, he found 'about eight little boys' in the abbey. This small medieval school took in two types of boys; some were 'child-oblates' training to become monks, whilst others were learning grammar for more secular careers. Gerald of Wales, who became a senior figure in the church and royal government during the reign of Henry II, attended the school in about 1160. In one of the many books he wrote, Gerald explained 'when I was in the years of boyhood and the days of my green youth I studied in the Abbey of St Peter at Gloucester under that most learned scholar, Master Haimo'. Today the King's School still cherishes the strong links it has with the cathedral that replaced the medieval abbey; these links are formalised by the fact that all Gloucester's boy and girl choristers are educated at King's.

In 1540 Henry VIII closed the Abbey of St Peter. In its place, by a charter of 1541 and statues of 1544, he established the new cathedral and a school known as the 'College School'. The statutes required the headmaster of the school to be "skilful in Latin and Greek, of good character and of godly life, well qualified for teaching, who may train up in piety and good learning those children who shall resort to our school for grammar". From 1541 until 1849 this school met in the former monastic library, a room which today is used as the Cathedral Library. Robert Aufield was the College School's first recorded headmaster.

In 1616 the controversial reformer William Laud was appointed Dean of Gloucester. One of the many changes he made was to insist that the school attend early morning prayers in his Lady Chapel. This decision inaugurated the tradition of morning assemblies, which still take place in the cathedral most days. The school became embroiled in the religious disputes which led to the outbreak of the Civil War. After its victory, in 1649 Parliament abolished all cathedral establishments and the school was brought under the control of the City Council.

After enduring a tumultuous time in the mid-17th century, the school prospered and experienced significant growth during the 18th century. Under headmaster Maurice Wheeler (1684 - 1712), the school housed about 80 boys and a series of reforms were instituted. Cathedral choristers were fully integrated as pupils rather than being educated in separate classes. A proper library was created and, alongside the rigours of Latin and Greek, the curriculum was extended to include Physical Education and gardening. It was in Wheeler's period that the school began to be referred to as "The King's School". Wheeler also initiated a competition known as the 'Combat of the Pen', which is still used by the school today to acknowledge high quality work.

In the mid-19th century, following a serious fire, the school moved into a new purpose-built Victorian schoolroom, where it flourished under headmaster Hugh Fowler. Towards the end of the century, a period of decline set in, mainly due to financial challenges, the rise of other public schools and the unwillingness of the Dean and Chapter to maintain more than a 'music school'. At the time of the First World War the school was a very small one with just 30 or so pupils, the majority of them choristers. A modest recovery occurred in the 1920s, but the striking revival of the school's fortunes came in the 1950s and 1960s inspired by the reforms of headmaster Tom Brown. The school expanded rapidly, gaining a new base in the Old Bishop's Palace from 1955 and moving toward co-education from 1969.

== Buildings and facilities ==
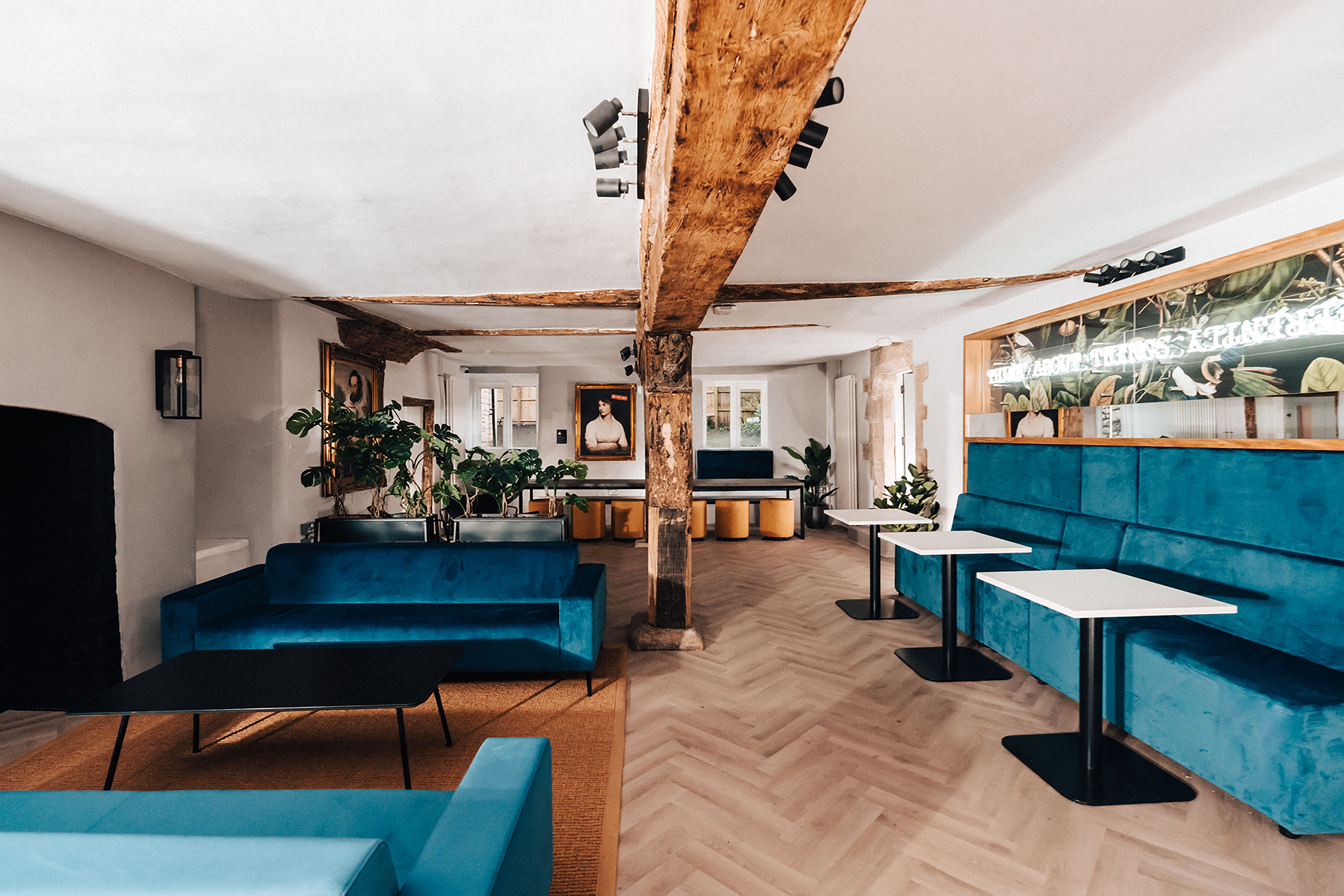
Common Room

The school is housed in a mix of medieval, 19th century and modern buildings located next to Gloucester Cathedral in the city centre. The cathedral is used for assemblies most mornings and also for concerts, special services and whole school occasions.

Junior School has its own modern classrooms built above the dining hall in the 1970s, opening onto the landscaped Paddock and providing access to the nearby Science laboratories. Senior School is based in the 19th century Old Bishop's Palace and in medieval Little Cloister House, which contains one of the oldest rooms to be used as a classroom anywhere in the country. Dulverton House originated as part of the monastic infirmary and has been imaginatively refurbished to provide a well-resourced Sixth Form Centre. The Victorian schoolroom, now known as the Ivor Gurney Hall, provides an airy and colourful base for dance and drama. Art and Design has its own designated area in Wardle House, a cathedral property which dates back to the 17th century. Music is based in the elegant 19th century former Probate Office.

- Little King's, for 3-5 year olds
- Junior school, for ages 6–11
- Senior school, for ages 11–16
- Sixth Form, for ages 16–18

Pupils are divided into Houses. In Junior School the houses - Potter, Simpkin and Tailor - take their names from the famous 'Tailor of Gloucester' story. In the Senior School, the houses are Laud, Wheeler and Serlo, named after, respectively, Archbishop William Laud, Maurice Wheeler, a former headmaster, and Abbot Serlo, an important figure in the founding of St Peter's Abbey. There are House competitions all year round, including sports, music, drama and quizzes.

== Archdeacon Meadow ==
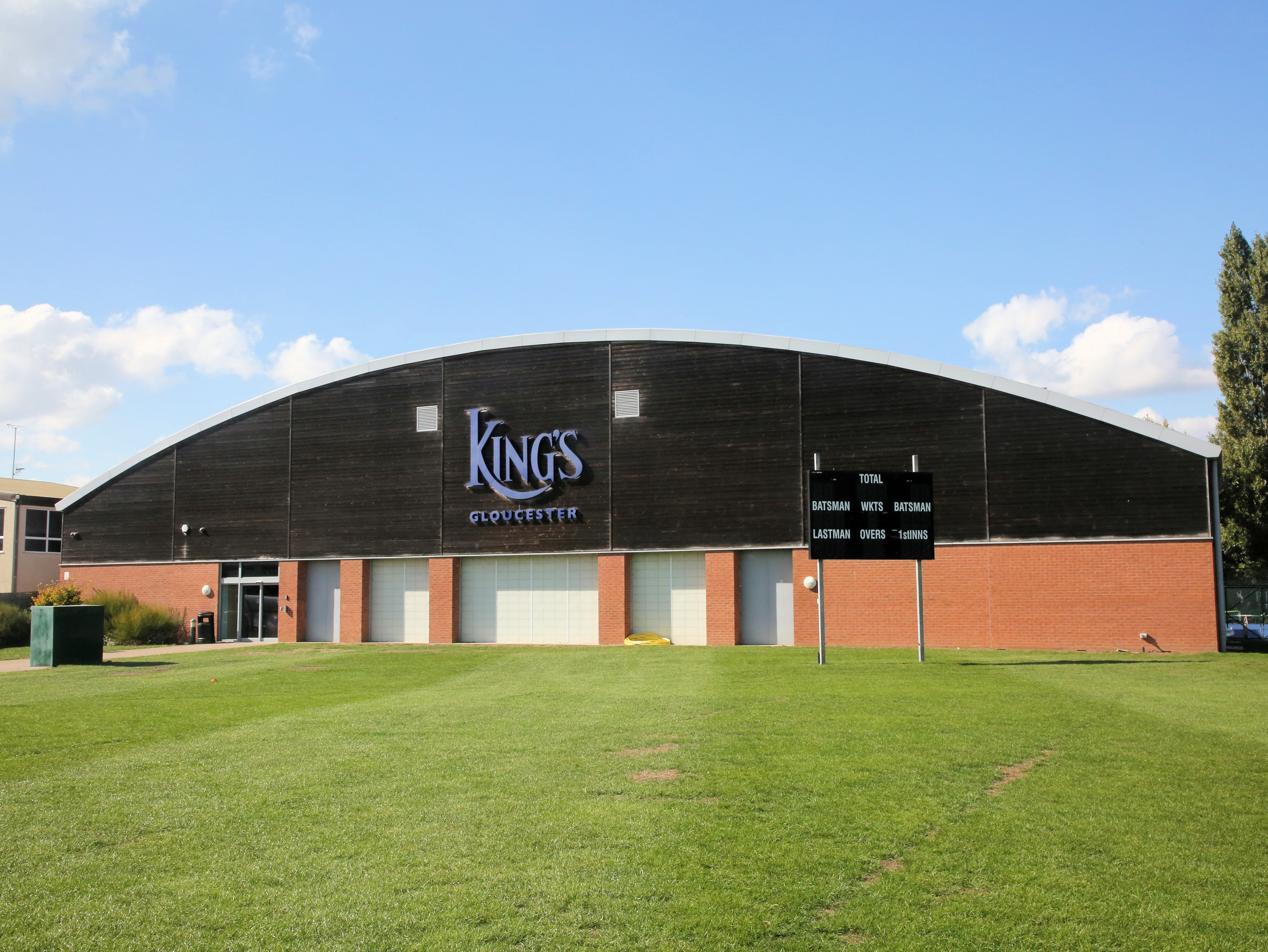
Sports Hall

The school owns Archdeacon Meadow, which is used as a sports field for rugby and cricket. For many years the Meadow was the home of the annual Gloucester Cricket Festival and still hosts occasional T-20 fixtures. Facilities have recently been modernised to include an indoor sports centre, built in 2012, and an all-weather hockey pitch completed in 2019.

== Notable former pupils ==
The following people were students at The King's School:

- Samuel Baker (1821−1893), English explorer
- Arthur Benoni Evans (1781−1854), English clergyman and writer
- Terry Biddlecombe (1941−2014), English racing jockey
- Luke Bond (b. 1980), English organist
- Kerensa Briggs (b. 1991), English composer
- George Worrall Counsel (1758−1843), English solicitor and antiquarian
- Edward Gardner (b. 1974), English conductor
- Ivor Gurney (1890−1937), English poet and composer
- Button Gwinnett (1735−1777), English-born American politician
- Hamish Harding (1964−2023), British businessman, pilot and explorer
- F. W. Harvey (1888−1957), English poet
- William Hayes (1706−1777), English organist and composer
- Jackie Hunter (b. 1956), English scientist
- Andy Johns (1950−2013), English recording engineer and record producer
- Charles Lewis (1853−1923), Welsh rugby player
- Paddy Logan (1845−1923), Liberal politician
- George Makins (1853−1933), English surgeon
- William Lort Mansel (1753−1820), English clergyman
- Isambard Owen (1850−1927), English physician and academic
- Simon Pegg (b. 1970), English actor
- Robert Raikes (1736−1811), English philanthropist and Sunday school pioneer
- Gordon Rawcliffe (1910−1979), English engineer and academic
- Richard Shephard (1949−2021), English composer
- George Sheringham (1884−1937), English painter
- John Stafford Smith (1750−1836), English organist and composer
- Charlie Stayt (b. 1962), English journalist and broadcaster
- Kerensa Briggs (b.1991), English composer
