= Ashleworth Tithe Barn =

Medieval tithe barn in Ashleworth, Gloucestershire, England

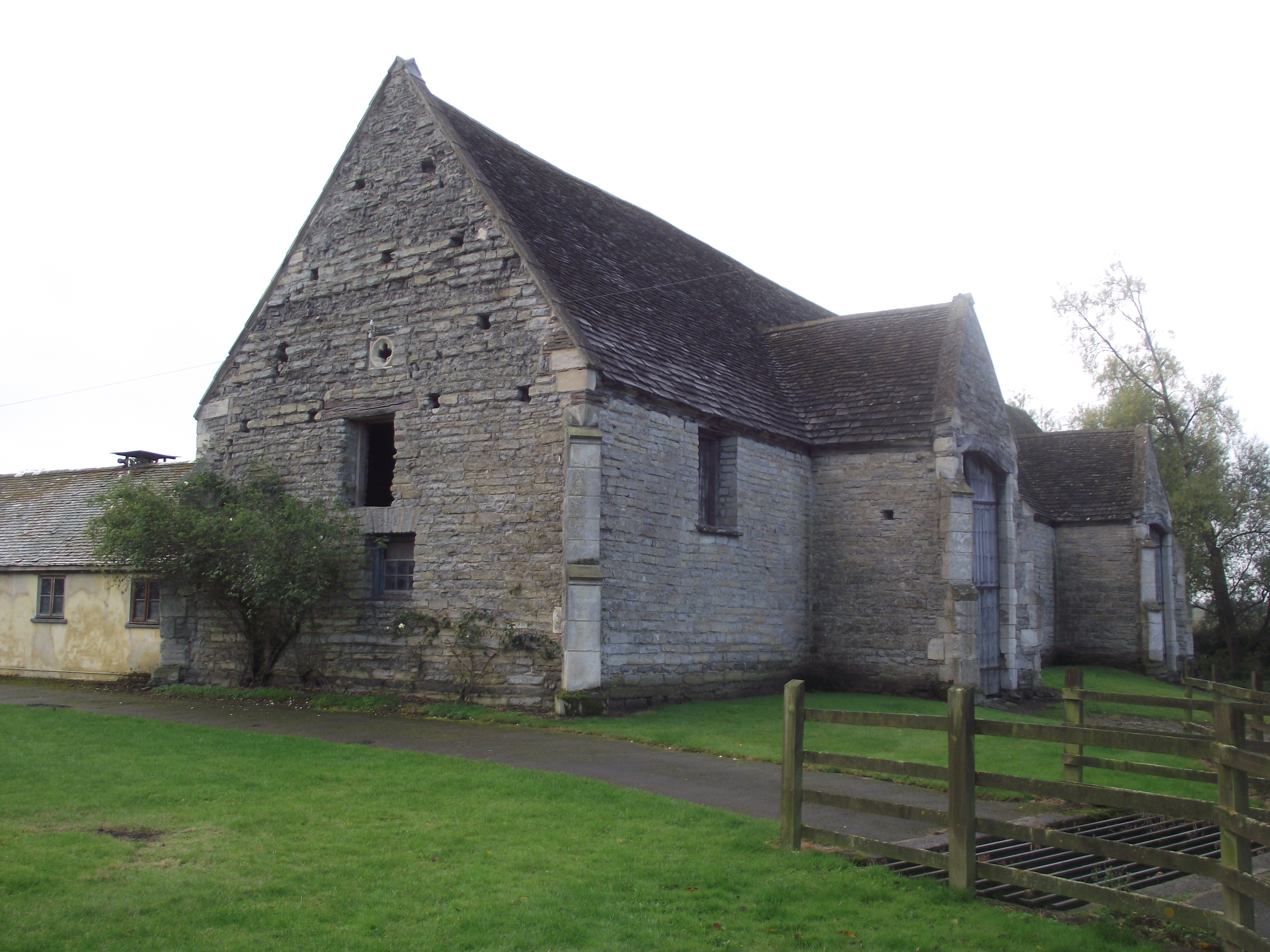
- Exterior of Ashleworth Tithe Barn

- Location within Gloucestershire

General information
- Location: Ashleworth grid reference SO818252, United Kingdom
- Coordinates: 51.925185°N 2.265081°W
- Construction started: c. 15th Century A. D.

Ashleworth Tithe Barn is a large 15th-century tithe barn located at Ashleworth, Gloucestershire, England, standing close to the River Severn. It is a Grade II* listed building, and has been scheduled as an ancient monument. It is close to, and associated with Ashleworth Court and the local Anglican church.

== History ==
The barn was built about 1500 by the canons of St Augustine's, Bristol while John Newland, (1481–1515) was the abbot. A tithe barn was a type of barn built in the Middle Ages for storing rents and tithes. Farmers were required to give one-tenth of their produce to the established Church.

After the Dissolution of the Monasteries the barn passed into secular use. In the 19th century it was converted into a barn for cows.

It was acquired by the National Trust in 1956. They have undertaken restoration work to the Buttresses and other stonework, but need to manage this to reduce the effects on the bat population which includes common pipistrelle (Pipistrellus pipistrellus), soprano pipistrelle (Pipistrellus pygmaeus) and brown long-eared (Plecotus auritus) which nest in the roof and cracks in the stonework.

== Architecture ==
The blue lias limestone building is 125 feet (38 m) long and 25 feet (7.6 m) wide.

The medieval timber framed roof of the barn is of ten bays, and is supported by buttresses. It has a stone slate roof. There are two porches on one side with double boarded doors. The end gables have square holes and there are more of these in the side walls. These were to encourage owls to enter the barn to control vermin.
