= Ashleworth =

Village in Gloucestershire, England

Coordinates: 51.92°N 02.27°W

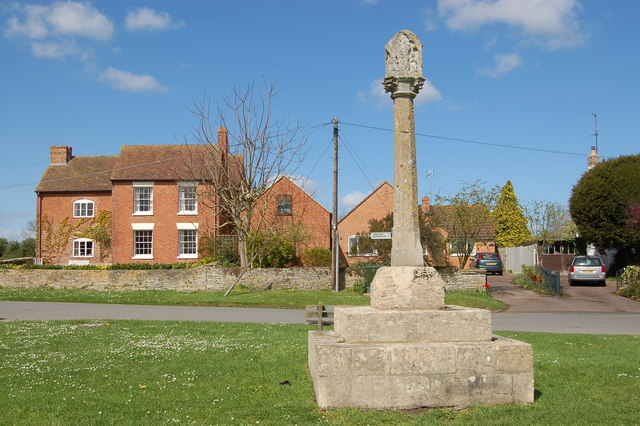
- The Preaching Cross

- Location within Gloucestershire
- OS grid reference: SO8125
- Shire county: Gloucestershire
- Region: South West
- Country: England
- Sovereign state: United Kingdom
- Post town: Gloucester
- Postcode district: GL19
- Police: Gloucestershire
- Fire: Gloucestershire
- Ambulance: South Western
- UK Parliament: Forest of Dean

Ashleworth (sometimes formerly spelled ‘Ashelworth’) is a village and civil parish in the Tewkesbury district of Gloucestershire, England, with a population of 614 (United Kingdom Census 2021), about six miles north of Gloucester. The oldest part of the village is Ashleworth Quay, on a flood plain on the west bank of the River Severn.

== History ==
The origins of the settlement go back at least to the Roman occupation; in recent years a number of Romano-British artefacts have been excavated in the area around the Quay dating from A.D.69 to A.D.390.

An ancient ferry, which used to link Ashleworth Quay to Sandhurst village on the east bank of the river closed in the 1950s. In medieval times the Quay was a major crossing point for the river as the flood meadows here are narrower than they are for many miles upstream. Consequently, Ashleworth would have been the last place from which to cross before reaching the outskirts of Tewkesbury, nearly eight miles upstream.

Near the Quay is the ancient parish church of Saints Andrew and Bartholomew, the Manor, the Court, the historic Tithe Barn and the former Boat Inn which was run by the Jelf family for nearly 400 years.

The village was mentioned in the Domesday Book (1086), at which time it was called Escelesworde, which translates loosely as Aescel's farmstead, or enclosure. After the Norman Conquest the manor was held by the Earls of Berkeley, but in the 12th century Robert Fitzharding, the earl at that time, gifted Ashleworth to St Augustine's Abbey, Bristol. Henry VIII later gave the manor to the Bishop of Gloucester.

The larger, more modern, part of the village spreads out from the village green situated on higher ground about half a mile to the Northwest. Near the Green is the village school and the former Queens Arms public house, now a private residence, with the centre of the village with its Memorial Hall and Post Office shop a couple of hundred yards further up the hill.

== Monuments ==
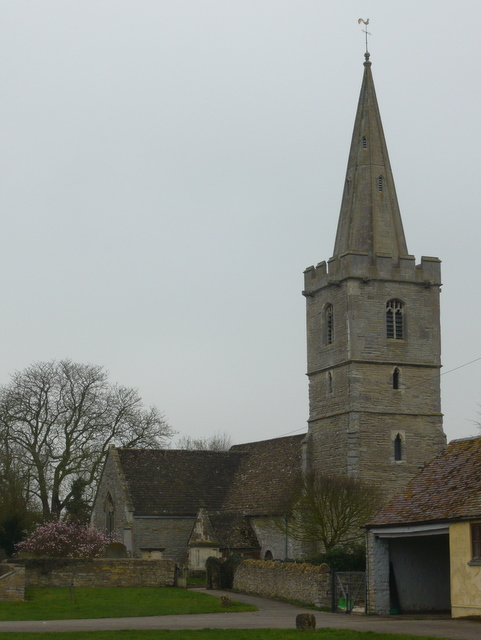
Ashleworth Church

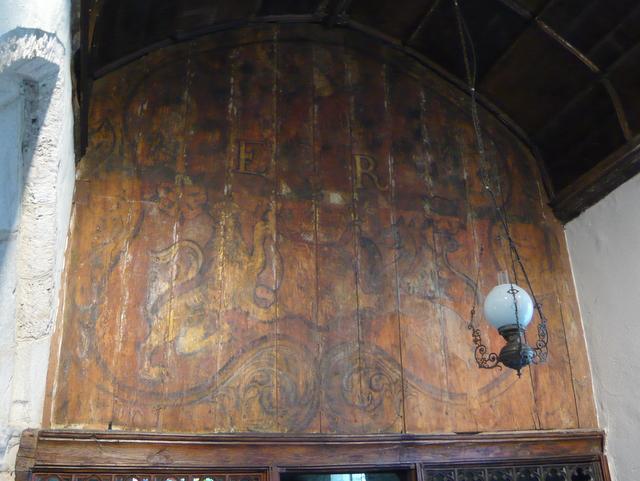
Royal Coat of Arms in the church

Sts Andrew and Bartholomew Church

The church is primarily 12th and 13th century, with later remodelling, but the origins are pure Saxon. Much of the north wall is built of striking Saxon herringbone stonework. The interior features one of the earliest known examples of a royal coat of arms (featuring a lion and a dragon) over the south chapel; this dates from the reign of Edward VI or, possibly, Elizabeth I. The church is Grade I listed.

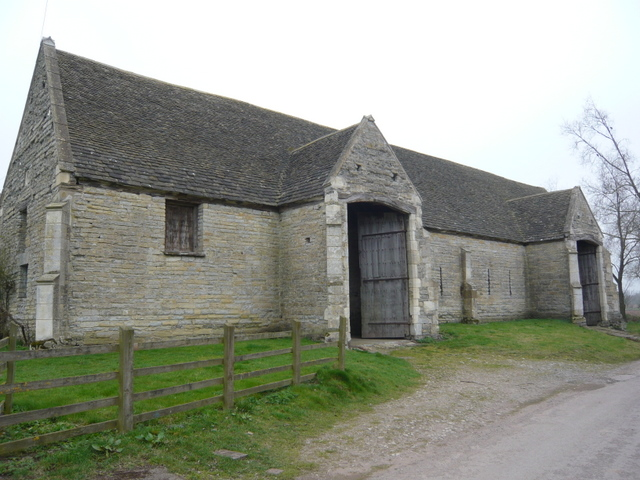
Ashleworth Tithe Barn

Ashleworth Tithe Barn

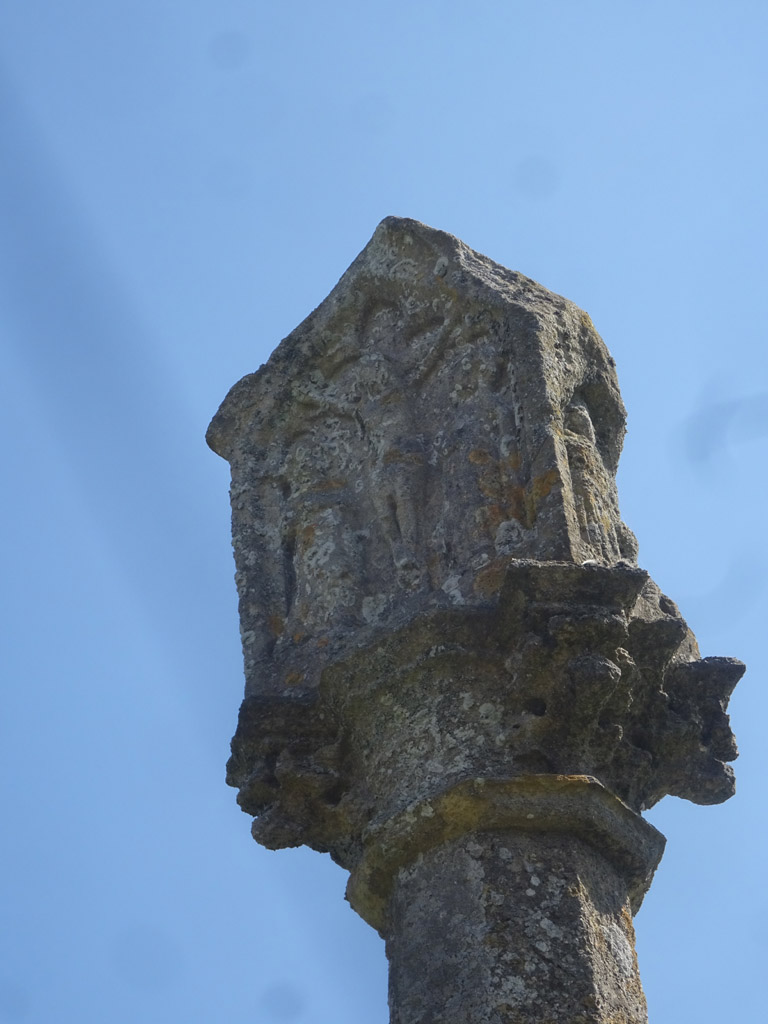
detail of the crucifixion carved in the cross

Adjacent to the court and church is a huge medieval tithe barn, now in the care of the National Trust. The barn was built in the period 1481 - 1515 by Abbot Newland of Bristol Abbey, and consists of ten bays. The interior roofing is a wonderful example of medieval timber framing.

The Preaching Cross

There is no evidence that the 14th century cross was a preaching cross despite it having been given that moniker in modern times (officially "High Cross"). Given LIDAR evidence of a DMV (Deserted Medieval Village) in the vicinity of the church, court and a ferry, it is likely that it originally stood near the quay for travellers and pilgrims to Tewkesbury Abbey to pray at for safe crossing. A common function for a wayside cross. It stands upon a three-step plinth, medieval base and the lower 6 inches of the shaft is probably Victorian. The 'cross', it is more of a simple shaft with a four sided top (common in some fashions) which has been carved with religious scenes. Gloucestershire HER offer “The head was removed from a hearth stone and the shaft a gatepost were reconstructed in the church graveyard between 1885 and 1887, finally restored with base on the village green in the 1970s." The scenes carved upon the cross may be thought to represent Mary and John, a Virgin and Child, St Augustine, and Robert Fitzharding, founder of Bristol Abbey, though close inspection will reveal a definite crucifixion on one face.

Other Historic Buildings

Apart from the church and tithe barn, Ashleworth has a number of older buildings, although they are not generally open to the public. These include Ashleworth Court, built in 1460, and still retaining its great hall, Ashleworth Manor (1460), a half-timbered manor house once owned by the Abbot of Bristol, and Foscombe House, a Victorian Gothic fantasy constructed by Thomas Fulljames. Ashleworth Court is Grade I listed.

== See also ==
- Ashleworth Ham
- Berkeley (hundred)
