= St Lawrence's Church, Sandhurst =

Church in Sandhurst, Gloucestershire, England

Coordinates: 51°54′30″N 2°15′05″W

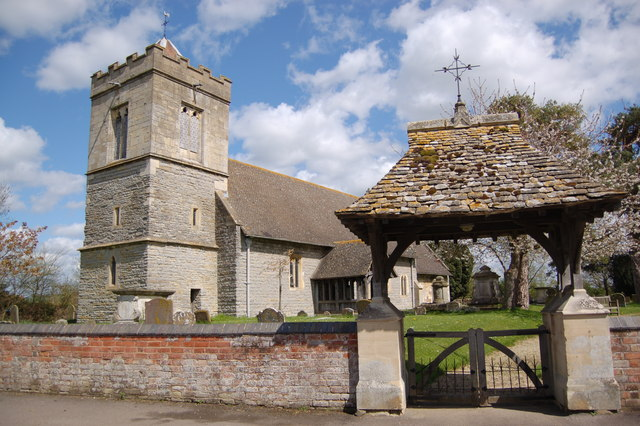
Church of St Lawrence, Sandhurst

The Church of St Lawrence is a Grade II* listed Church of England church in Sandhurst, Gloucestershire.

It was rebuilt to a design by Thomas Fulljames in 1857–58.
