= Foscombe =

Coordinates: 51°56′19″N 2°17′28″W

Foscombe House
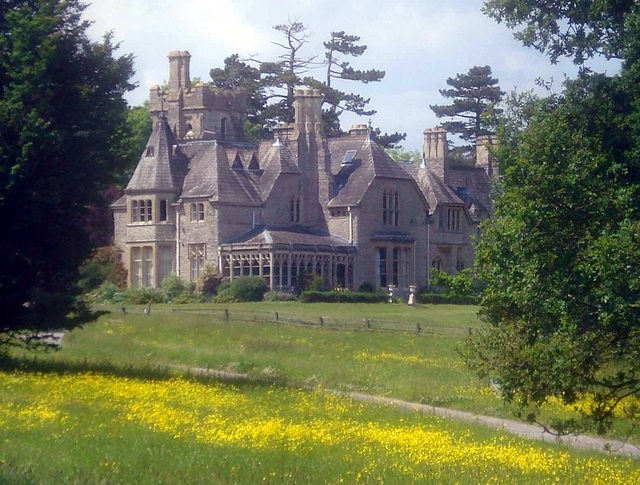
- Foscombe House
- Interactive map of Foscombe House
- Location: Foscombe, Gloucestershire

History
- Built: 1866

Site notes
- Architect: Thomas Fulljames
- Owner: private ownership

Listed Building – Grade II*
- Official name: Foscombe, Foscombe Lane
- Designated: 26 November 1986
- Reference no.: Thomas Fulljames

Foscombe House (often simply known as Foscombe) is a Grade II* listed Gothic Revival country house and estate located on Foscombe Hill in the parish of Ashleworth, Gloucestershire, England. Completed in 1866, the mansion was designed by and built for the prominent regional architect Thomas Fulljames as his personal retirement residence.

Architectural historian Nikolaus Pevsner described the property in his "Buildings of England" Architectural Guides as "an unspoiled Victorian fantasy in an unsurpassed situation commanding exquisite views in all directions. Foscombe House is the epitome of glorious Victorian Gothic architecture with sun filled rooms enhanced by the most beautiful features. The height and proportions of the rooms creates the most wonderful flow of living space and for such a substantial property, there is a feeling of comfortable living and a warm environment further enhanced by the far reaching outlook from all the principal rooms."

Spanning over 16,000 square feet, the estate is also notable for its 20th-century ownership by rock history figures, most notably the late Rolling Stones drummer Charlie Watts.

History

Conception and Fulljames residency

The estate was conceived by Thomas Fulljames (1808–1874), a trained architect who served as the County Surveyor for Gloucestershire and Diocesan Surveyor for Gloucester. He established a highly successful practice in Gloucester in 1830 and later formed the firm Fulljames & Waller alongside one of his former pupils, Frederick Sandham Waller.

In 1866, the partnership jointly designed Foscombe House to act as Fulljames's retirement home. Fulljames, who also served as the lord farmer of Ashleworth manor, occupied the house from its completion until his death in April 1874.

Subsequent ownership

Following Fulljames's death, the house passed through several private hands:

- The Calvert Family: The descendants of the prolific English industrialist and inventor Joseph Bramah held residency at the estate from 1875 until the mid-20th century.
- Derek Marlowe: The English novelist and playwright purchased the home in 1972 and lived there until 1976.
- Charlie Watts: The Rolling Stones drummer purchased the estate from Marlowe in 1976 and resided there with his family until 1983. During his tenure, Watts adapted the estate's coach house into a custom rehearsal and recording studio for the band.

The estate has undergone minor external alterations, including the demolition of a small auxiliary wing in the mid-20th century, alongside highly sympathetic internal restorations in the 21st century.

Architecture

Historic England designated Foscombe House as a Grade II* listed building on 26 November 1986, recognizing it as a building of exceptional historical and architectural importance.

Exterior

The main house is built out of coursed, squared blue lias stone accented with contrasting ashlar dressings. It features an asymmetrical layout typical of the Gothic Revival style, capped with steep slate roofs and multiple gables. The facade is dominated by a prominent castellated tower with an attached circular turret. The main entrance boasts a distinctive Tudor-arched doorway decorated with intricate iron hinges and flanked by fine marble colonnettes.

Interior

The living space spans three main storeys plus a specialized room situated in the tower. Key internal features include:

- Ground Floor formal rooms: The ground floor incorporates a spacious drawing room, a morning room, and a sitting room, all finished with ornate stone fireplaces and large bay windows.
- Central Hall: The main hallway features a grand, carved stone staircase inset with decorative Gothic quatrefoils.
- The Orangery: A preserved Victorian glass conservatory links directly to the formal reception spaces.
- Tower Room: A smoking room situated on the third floor of the tower features pointed gothic windows that provide access to an open roof terrace.

Grounds

Foscombe House stands within 52 acres of private grounds comprising formal parkland, managed wildflower meadows, mature woodland and farmed pastureland. Positioned on the elevated summit of Foscombe Hill, the tower overlooks the surrounding countryside, offering panoramic views across nine English and Welsh counties.

The main entrance features a carriage courtyard with a central fountain, accessed via two separate tree-lined driveways expanding approximately half a mile to the north and south.

Auxiliary buildings

- The Coach House: The original Victorian coach house and stable block—famously used as a music studio by The Rolling Stones—was later converted into a detached, 3,000-square-foot, three-bedroom residential guest cottage.
- The Stables: A modern leisure facility housed within the old stable block.
