= Hillfield House =

Historic building in Gloucester, England

Coordinates: 51°52′12″N 02°13′48″W

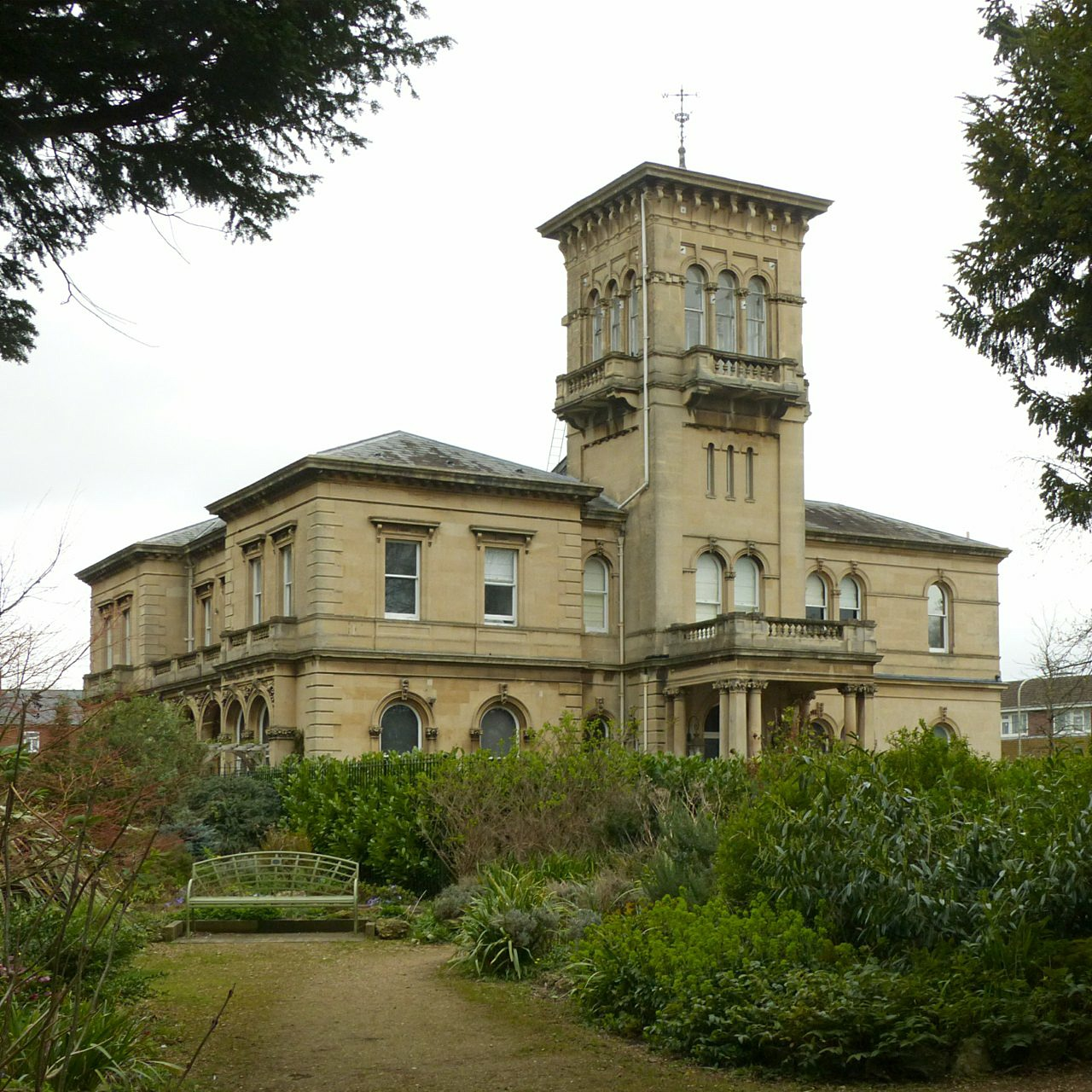
Hillfield House

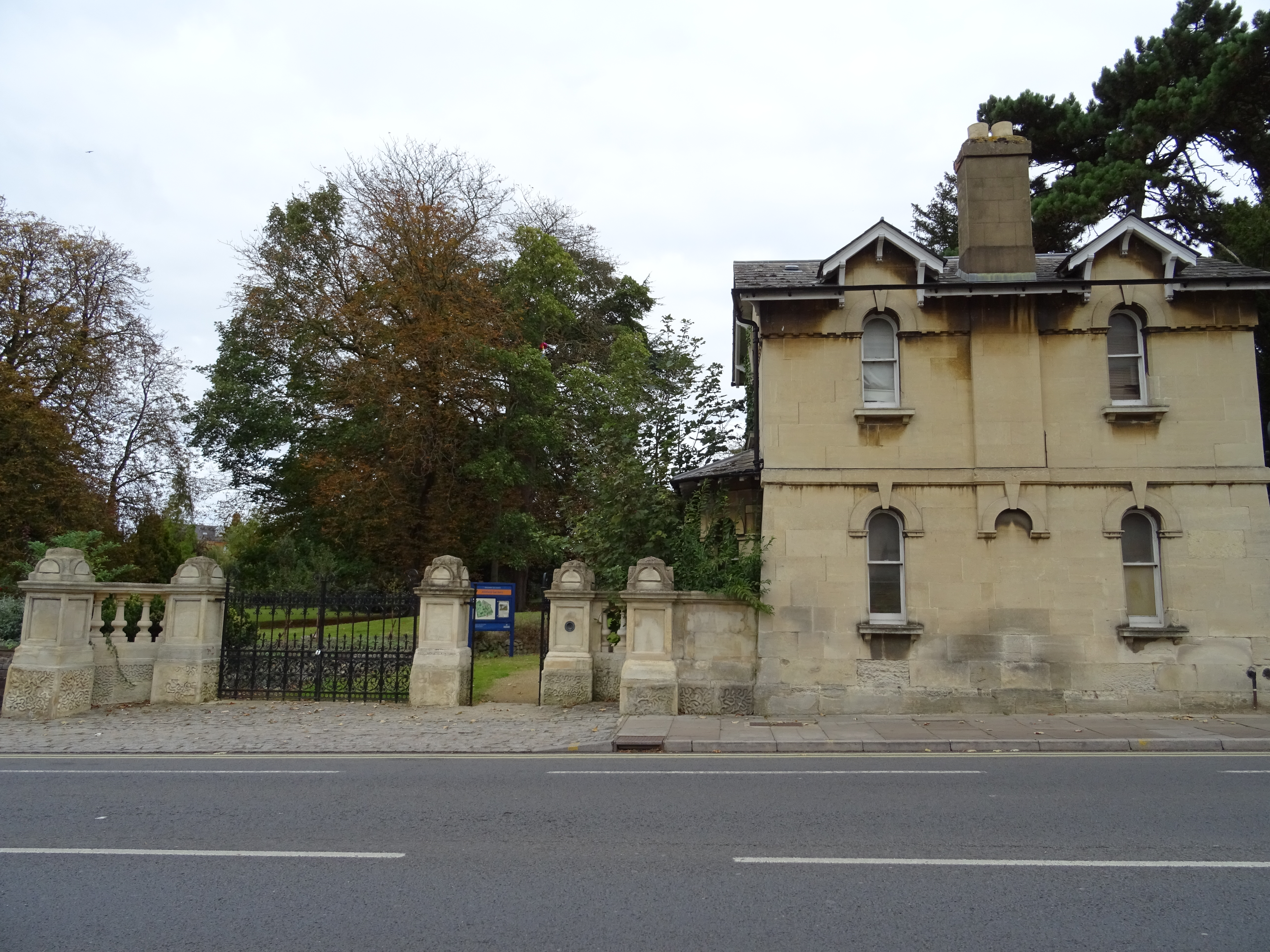
Entrance gates and former lodge to Hillfield House

Hillfield House is a grade II listed house in Denmark Road, Gloucester, in England. The building, in the Italianate style popularised by Charles Barry, is faced in ashlar Bath stone, with a centrally placed tower and a porte-cochère entrance.

It was built in 1867–69 by Albert Estcourt to a design by John Giles for the timber merchant Charles Walker, and replaced an earlier house of 1826 known as Woodbine Hill. One source states that the previous building was a "classical villa which dates back to around 1820". It once had extensive grounds, but these are now a park known as Hillfield Gardens. The description in December 2020 stated: "Now a Council-owned public park covering about 1.6 hectares, Highfield Gardens is supported by an active Friends group which organises annual events".

During WW I the property was used as an emergency hospital. Between 1933 and 2014, the house was occupied as offices by local government agencies. A survey in 2014 "described the house as a "classical villa which dates back to around 1820 and is of significant historical value to the city".

The historic listing described the building as "a good example of a mid C19 villa, particularly notable for its fine interior" and another source called it the "most elaborate Victorian house in Gloucester".

The gates and lodge to the former entrance from London Road have also been Grade II listed, since 1998. The summary states: "Entrance gates to public gardens, formerly the gates to the grounds... ashlar piers and balustrade, wrought-iron gates. Carriage gateway and pedestrian gateway to right set back between short quadrant balustrades".

== Recent history ==
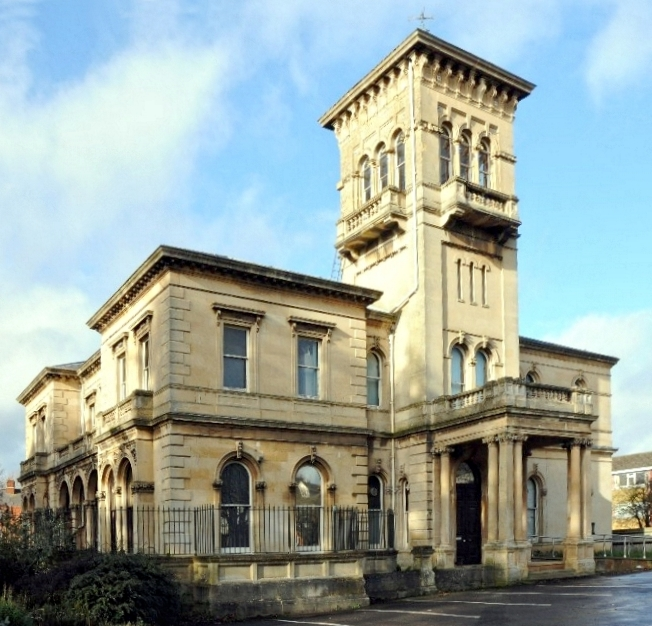
The House in 2014

The buyer who purchased the property in 2014 intended to convert it into a private residence. Major renovations have been completed since that time. In February 2020, a news item described the home as consisting of "23 rooms that boast period touches and plenty of space" That included the main section of the house and the secondary wing that contained two bedroom flat.
