= Church of St Mary & Corpus Christi =

Church in Down Hatherley, Gloucestershire, England

Coordinates: 51°54′03″N 2°11′37″W

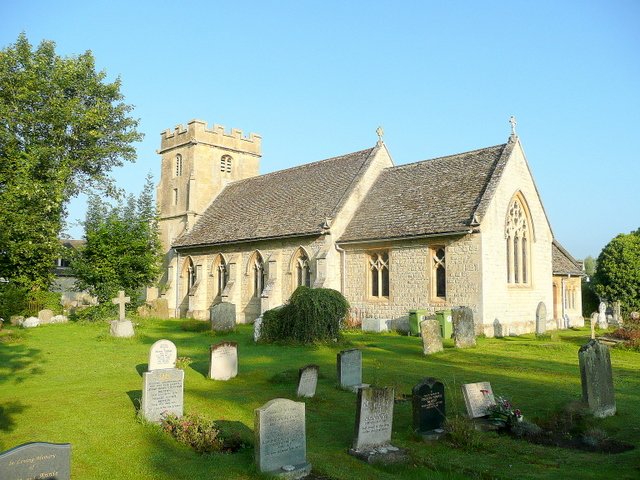
Church of St. Mary and Corpus Christi, Down Hatherley.

The Church of St Mary & Corpus Christi is a grade II* listed Church of England church in Down Hatherley, Gloucestershire. It was rebuilt to a design by Thomas Fulljames in 1859–60.
