= Gloucester Court of Probate =

Building in Gloucester, Gloucestershire, England

Coordinates: 51°52′03″N 2°14′40″W

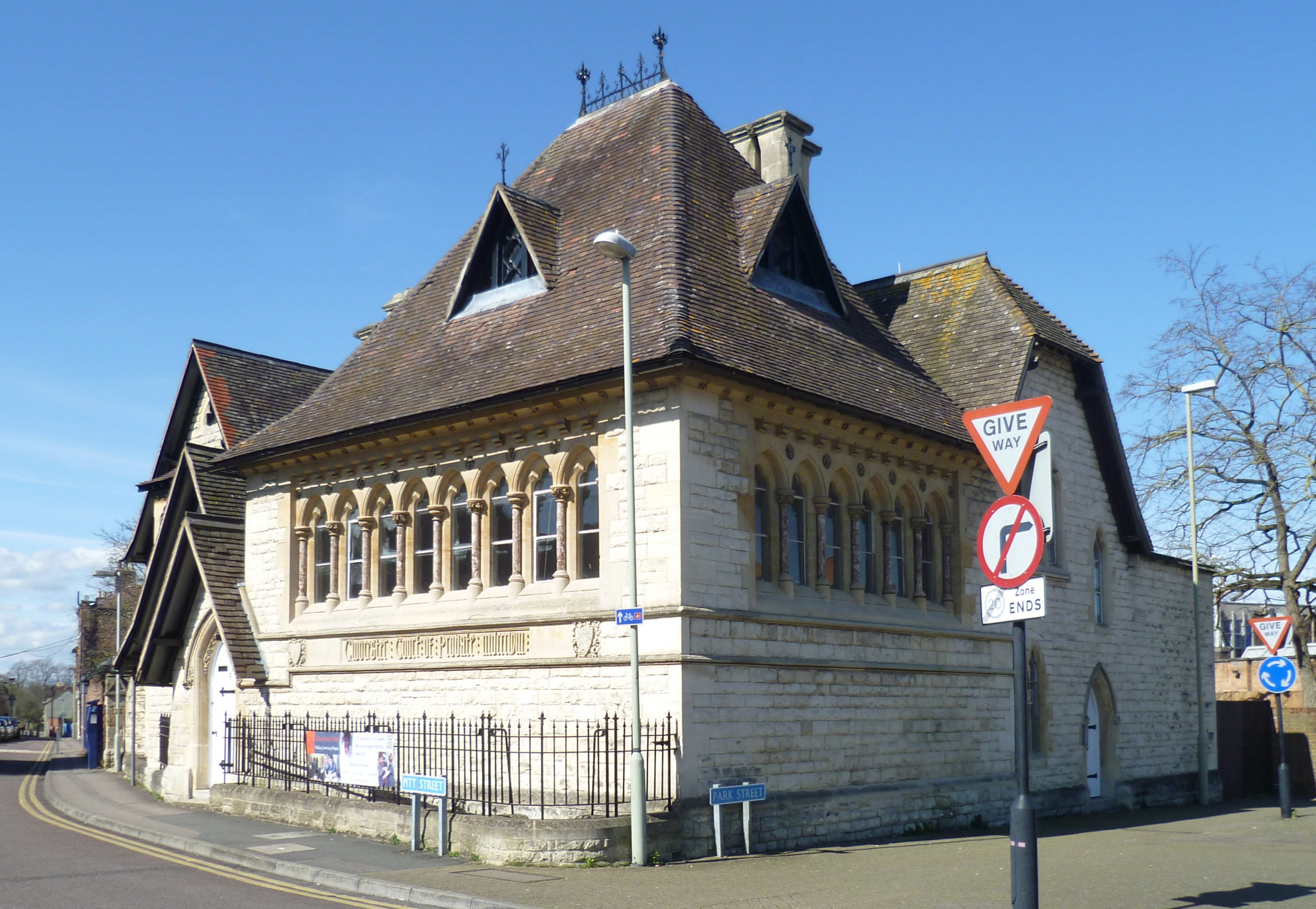
The former Gloucester Court of Probate

Gloucester Court of Probate is a grade II listed building at 3–4 Pitt Street, Gloucester in England.

It was designed by Thomas Fulljames of Fulljames & Waller in 1858 in a "picturesque Gothic style" and built by Oliver Estcourt at a cost of £1,100. The building has been converted to offices and is no longer in use as a court.
