= Ashleworth Ham =

Biological Site of Special Scientific Interest in Gloucestershire, England

- Site of Special Scientific Interest
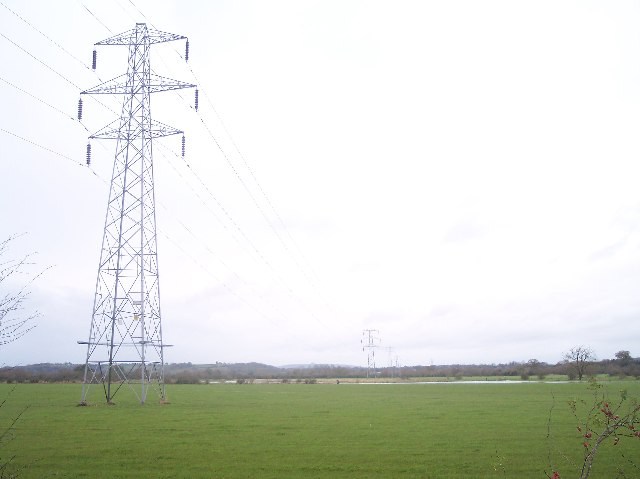
- A view of the Ham
- Location of Ashleworth Ham.
- Area of search: Gloucestershire
- Grid reference: SO833263
- Coordinates: 51.936°N 2.244°W
- Interest: Biological
- Area: 104.73 ha (258.8 acres)
- Notification date: 1974

Ashleworth Ham (grid reference SO833263) is a 104.73-hectare (258.8-acre) biological Site of Special Scientific Interest. It is a large area of grassland on the Severn floodplain, north of Ashleworth in Gloucestershire, England. It is registered as a Site of Special Scientific Interest and was notified in 1974 and renotified in 1985. Ashleworth Ham received this designation because it is one of three sites in the Severn Vale where migratory waterfowl winter.

The site has three units of assessment and is part managed as a nature reserve by the Gloucestershire Wildlife Trust. The nature reserve is unit 1 (grid reference SO830265) and is a 45-hectare (110-acre) area. Unit 2 (grid reference SO833261) is a 55-hectare (140-acre) site and unit 3 (grid reference SO829258) is a 4-hectare (9.9-acre) site, and are areas to the east of the nature reserve.

The site is fen, marsh, swamp lowland, open water ditches, neutral grassland and hedges divide many of the fields.

Access to the reserve is prohibited in winter, but the birds may be viewed from hides in Meerend Thicket. The Thicket is a steep wooded bank and indicates the former much higher boundary of the Severn. In addition, some parts of the Ham are of special botanical interest. Meerend Thicket is listed in the ‘Tewkesbury Borough Local Plan to 2011’, adopted March 2006, Appendix 3 'Nature Conservation',' as a Key Wildlife Site (KWS).

This part of the Vale, which is alluvium over Lower Lias clay, has been greatly affected by drainage and other agricultural improvements. A public enquiry resulted in the exclusion of the reserve from the Internal Drainage Board scheme.

== Species ==
Fuller information may be found in the Gloucestershire Wildlife Trust nature reserves handbook. The wintering wildfowl include wigeon (est. 4000), teal (est. 1500) and mallard (est. 1000) in large numbers. Smaller numbers can be seen of pintail and shoveler. Tufted duck, pochard, goldeneye and great crested and little grebe are amongst the diving birds at peak floods. Regular visitors are Bewick's swan and white-fronted geese. There is a small breeding population of mallard, lapwing, common snipe, curlew and redshank. Other breeding species including redstart, grasshopper warbler, sedge warbler, yellow wagtail and reed bunting. The meadows are also used as a feeding ground by many migrants. Snipe are the most common, but whimbrel, green sandpiper, greenshank and ruff may be seen. In some winters up to 4000 fieldfare are present and peregrine falcon and hobby may be seen, these birds being attracted by the small birds.

The reserve flora includes common meadow-rue and great burnet which is typical of old, unimproved neutral meadows. There are a large number of plant types recorded in the wooded bank, fields, and ditches. There is golden dock, trifid bur-marigold, purple loosestrife and several species of sedge.

== Conservation ==
The prime aim is to maintain a good wetland habitat for birds and plants. Thus the control of water levels is essential and two sluices were installed in 1977/78 and a wader scrape was excavated. Grazing does not happen until the young birds have fledged. There is regular pollarding of boundary willows. Any polluted silt is cleared.

== Publications ==
- Kelham, A, Sanderson, J, Doe, J, Edgeley-Smith, M, et al., 1979, 1990, 2002 editions, 'Nature Reserves of the Gloucestershire Trust for Nature Conservation/Gloucestershire Wildlife Trust'

== SSSI Source ==
- Natural England SSSI information on the citation
- Natural England SSSI information on the Ashleworth units
