= Ashleworth Court =

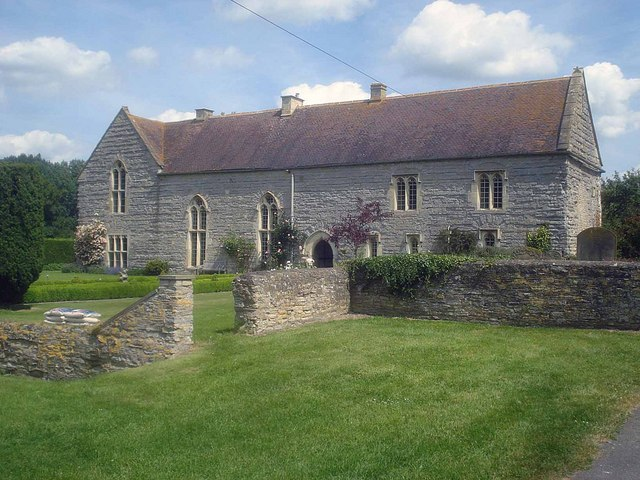

- Location within Gloucestershire
- 51°55′30.720″N 2°15′54.432″W
- Location: Ashleworth, Gloucestershire, England
- OS grid reference: SO8186525218

History
- Built: 1460, altered in the 16th and 17th centuries

Listed Building – Grade I

Ashleworth Court is a grade I listed house close to the River Severn in Ashleworth, Gloucestershire, England.

The site has revealed pottery from Roman Britain. Ashleworth was donated to the church in the 12th century. The blue lias stone house was built around 1460 for Bristol Abbey. It has been revised several times including the division of the great hall with a new upper floor in the 17th century. The thatched roof has been replaced with tiles. The house is close to, and associated with Ashleworth Tithe Barn and the local Anglican church forming an example of an Augustinian rectorial manor.

== History ==
The estate was donated by the Earl of Berkeley in the 12th century. The house was completed around 1460 for Bristol Abbey while John Newland, (1481–1515) was the abbot.

The building was altered in the 16th and 17th centuries. The hall was revised and an upper floor created, and then in the 18th century internal partitions were added, although these have since been removed.

Excavations and trial pits during 2013 as part of the planning to turn the court into a wedding venue revealed 1st century Roman-British pottery. It is now used as a Bed and breakfast.

== Architecture ==
The blue lias stone building has a tiled roof, although it previously had a thatched roof with three chimney stacks. The house retains is great hall and cross passage, in the four-room main block, along with wings at either end of the rear of the building. There is an oriel with a stone spiral staircase.
