= Pitt Street, Gloucester =

Street in Gloucester, England

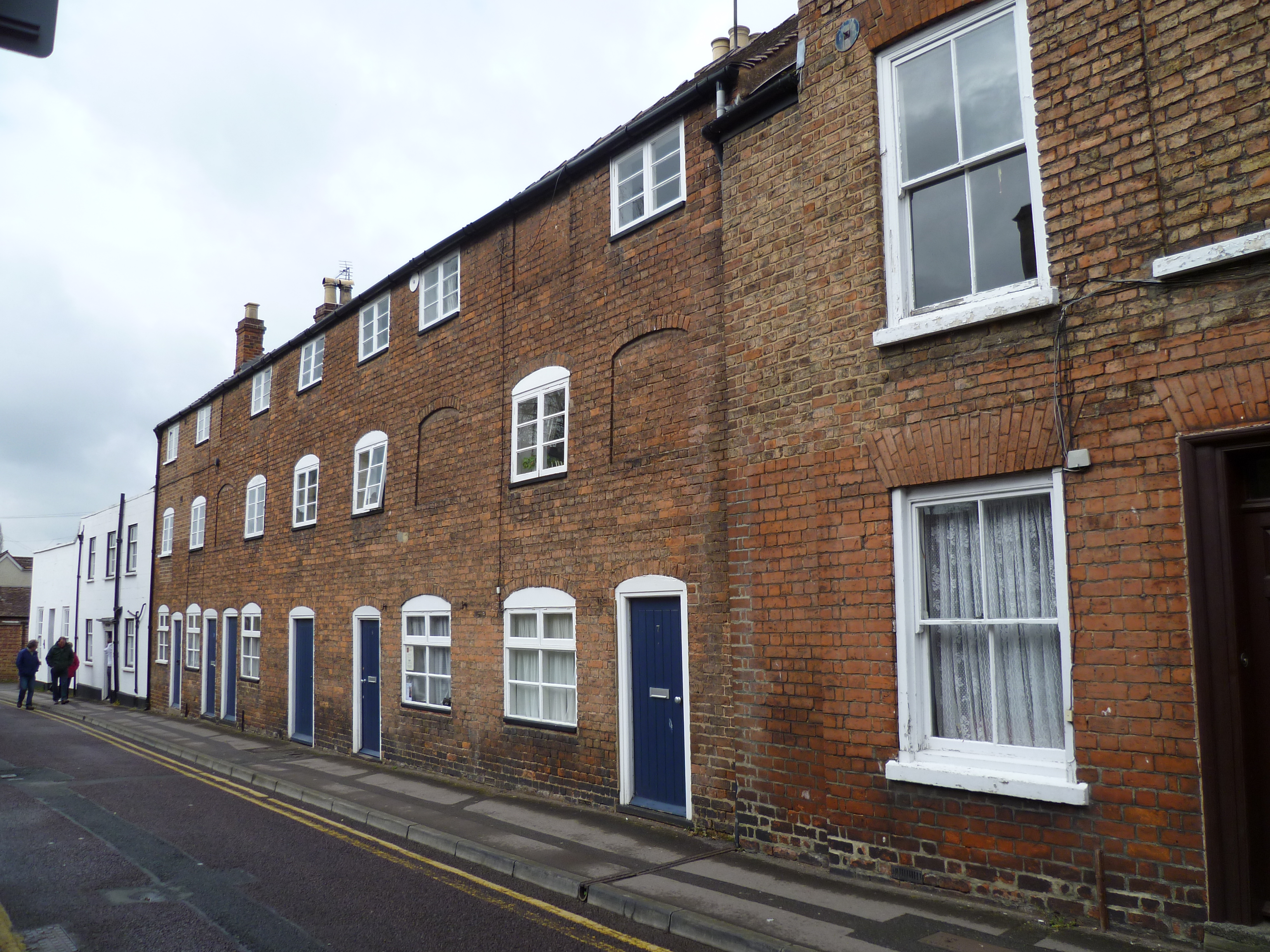
6-13 Pitt Street

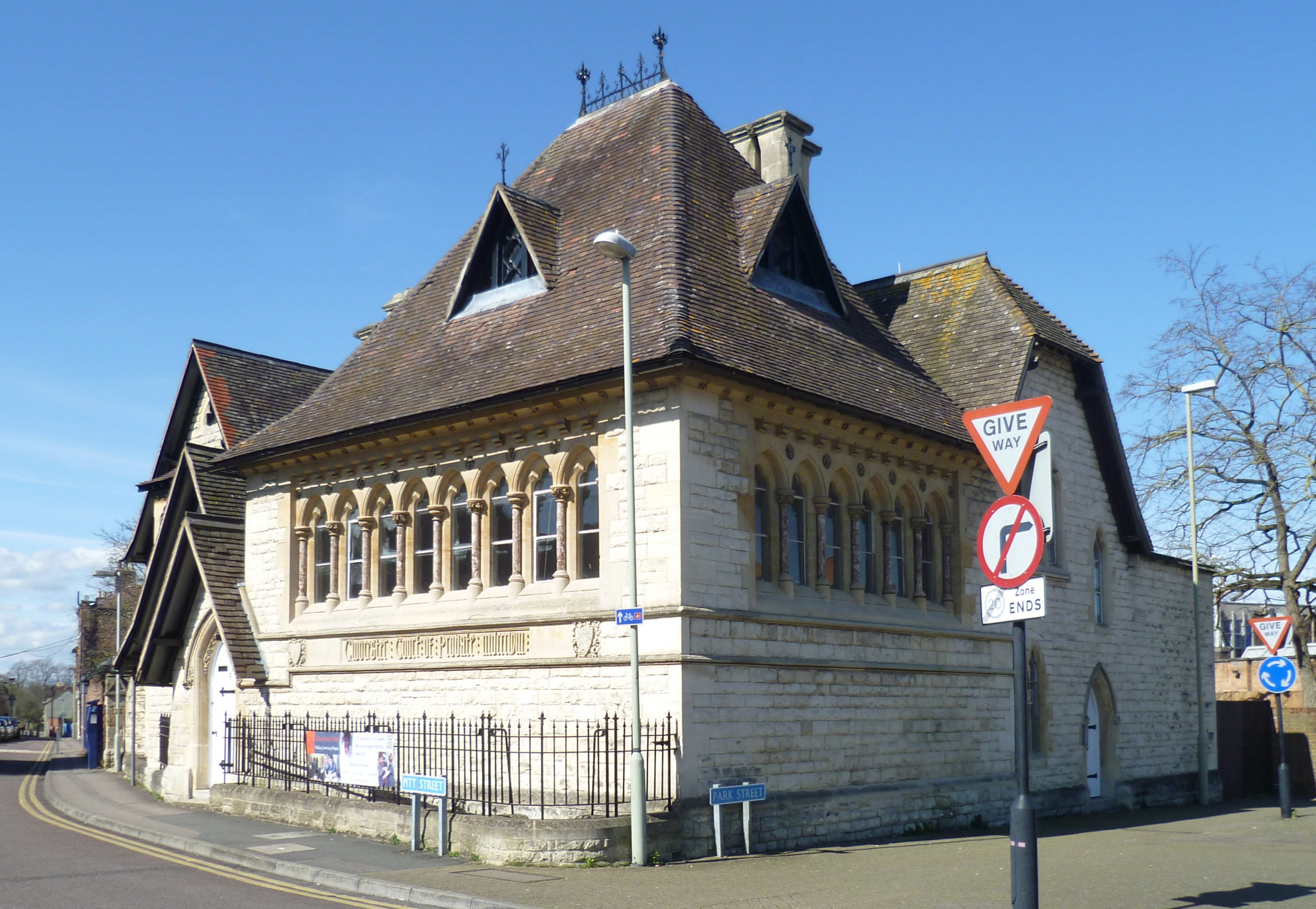
Gloucester Court of Probate

Pitt Street in the City of Gloucester runs between the junction of Priory Road, Archdeacon Street, and St Mary's Street in the north and the junction of Hare Lane and Park Street in the south.

It is the location of a number of listed buildings:

- Gloucester Court of Probate, designed 1858 by Thomas Fulljames
- Buildings on both sides of the street that are part of King's School.
- 5-13 Pitt Street
- Walls relating to the precinct of Gloucester Cathedral.
- The Pelican Inn public house, formerly the College Arms.
