= Thomas Fulljames =

Thomas Fulljames FRIBA
- Born: 4 March 1808; Walworth, Surrey, England
- Died: 24 April 1874 (aged 65–66); Ashleworth, Gloucestershire, England
- Occupation: Architect
- Spouse: Catherine
- Practice: Fulljames & Waller
- Buildings: Gloucester Court of Probate, 1858.
- Design: Severn Barrage, 1849.

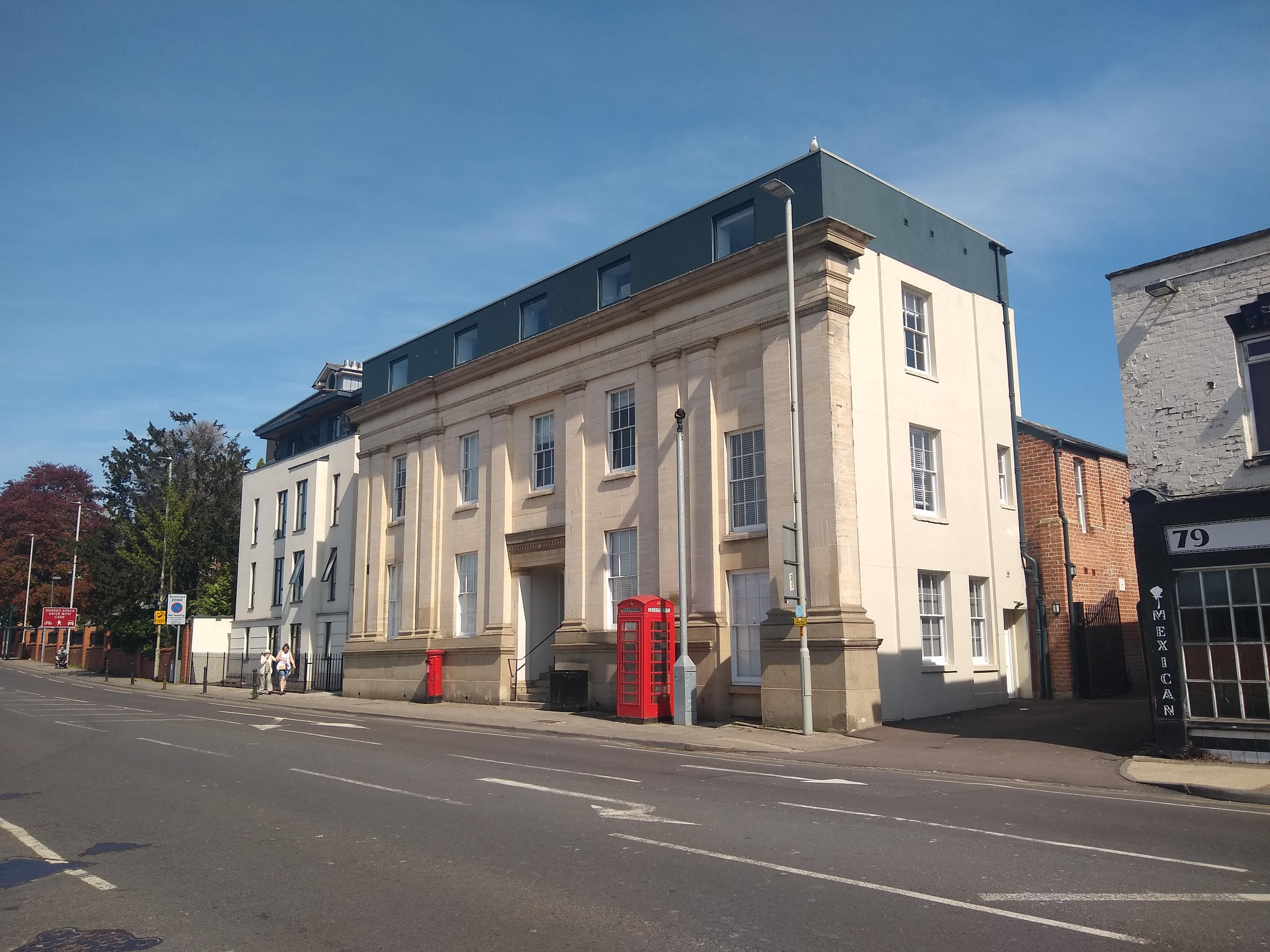
Albion House, Southgate Street, Gloucester, 1831. Formerly the Albion Hotel. With later grade II listed K6 telephone kiosk.

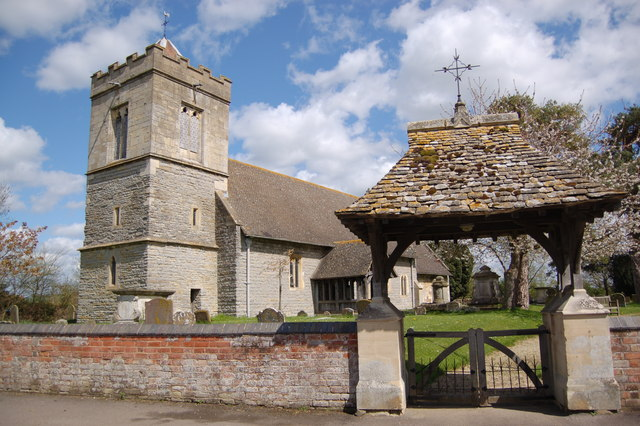
Church of St Lawrence, Sandhurst. Rebuilt by Fulljames, 1857–58.

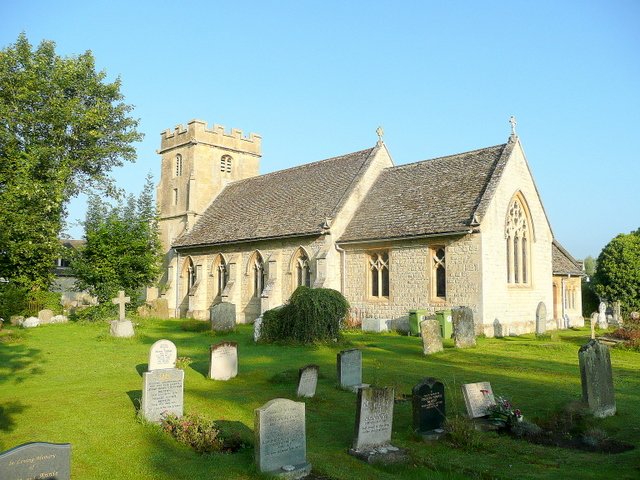
Church of St Mary & Corpus Christi, Down Hatherley. Rebuilt by Fulljames, 1859–60.

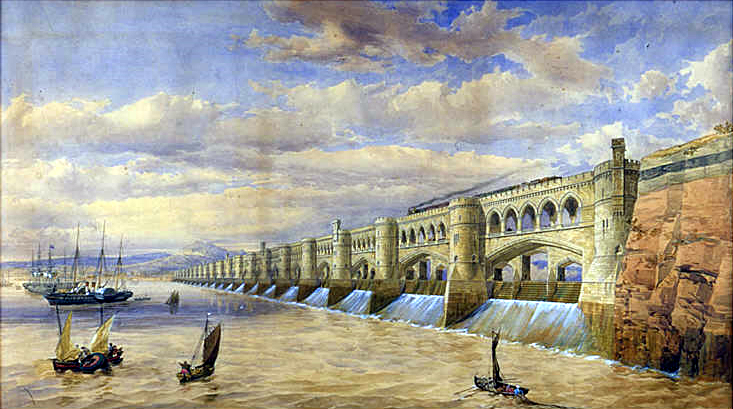
Fulljames's unbuilt design for a Severn Barrage, 1849

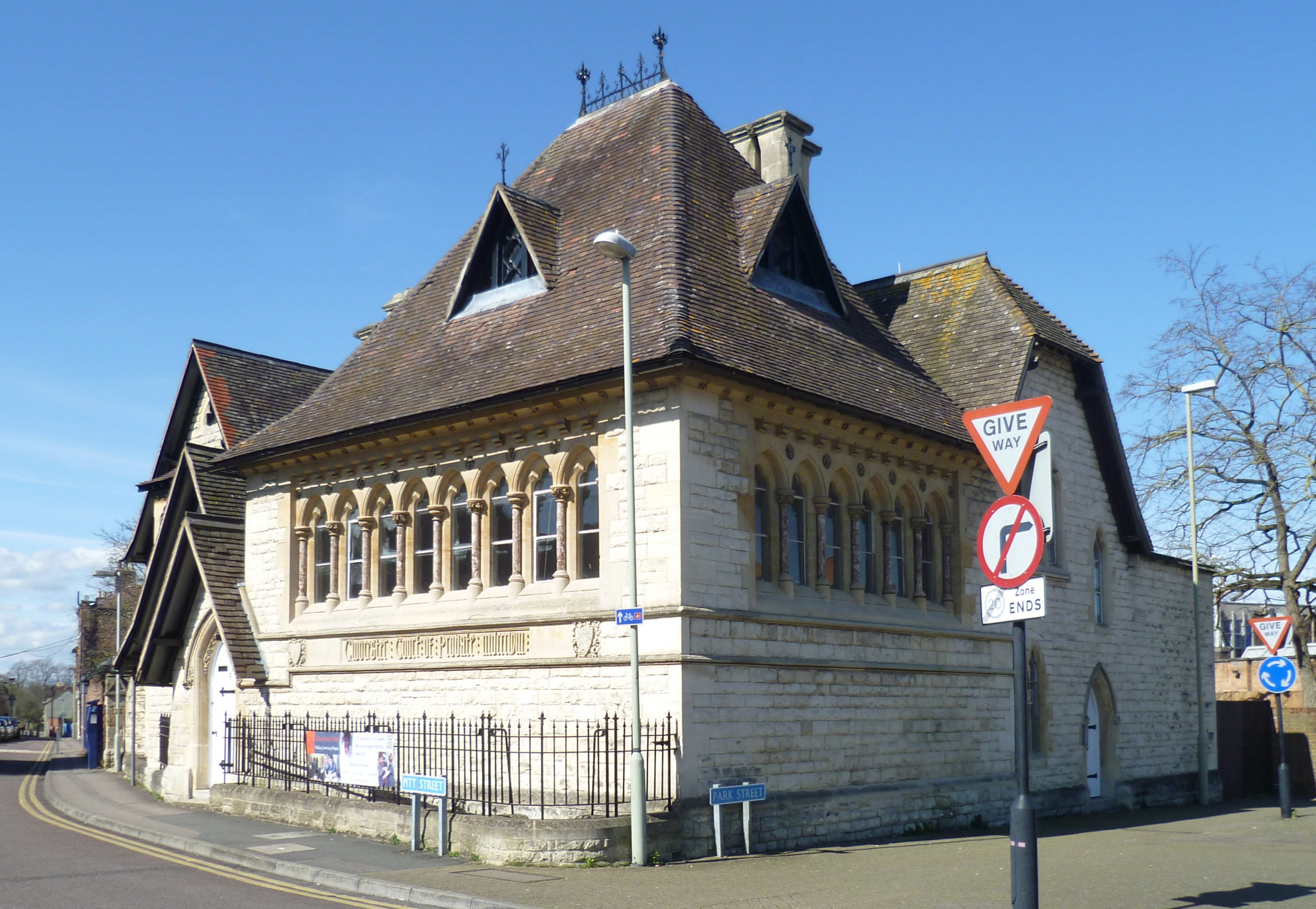
Gloucester Court of Probate, 1858

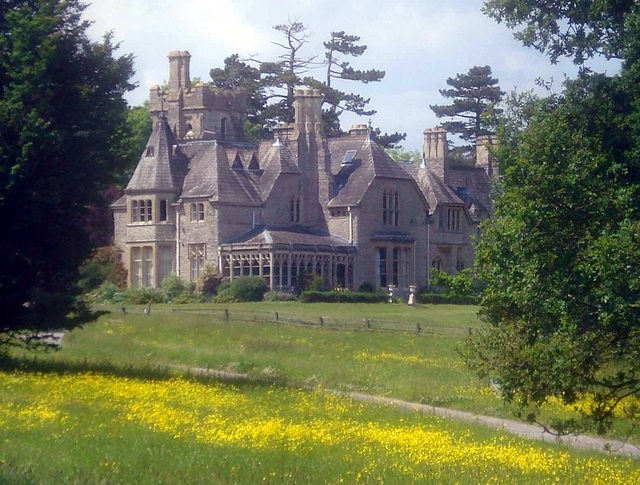
Foscombe, designed c.1860 by Fulljames for his own use

Thomas Fulljames FRIBA (4 March 1808 – 24 April 1874) was an architect active in Gloucestershire, England, in the first half of the nineteenth century. As diocesan surveyor from 1832 until 1870, latterly in partnership with Frederick Sandham Waller, he designed, reconstructed or extended a number of churches in Gloucestershire.

He is known for designing the former psychiatric asylum at Denbighshire (1842-1844) in Jacobean style and the Gloucester Court of Probate (1858) in the Gothic style. He also designed a barrage across the River Severn, which was never built. He built Foscombe house for his own use in Ashleworth, Gloucestershire, which has been classified as a grade II* heritage building.

== Early life and family ==
Thomas Fulljames was born in Walworth, Surrey, now in Greater London, on 4 March 1808, to Trophimus Fulljames (died 1864), a land surveyor, and Margaret Fulljames. He was baptised at Hasfield, Gloucestershire, on 15 September 1808. He had an older brother, also Trophimus, born around 1805.

== Career ==
Fulljames studied with his uncle, the surveyor Thomas Fulljames (died 1847), who had established a practice in Gloucestershire by the 1790s, and from 1821 was apprenticed to the architect Thomas Rickman, a position arranged by Fulljames's uncle Thomas.

He first practised in his own name from around 1830 when he opened an office at 1 Barton Street. He was appointed county surveyor in 1831. In 1838 he was elected a fellow of the Royal Institute of British Architects. In 1846 the firm became Fulljames & Waller after he formed a partnership in that year with Frederick Sandham Waller (1822–1895) who had been articled to him in 1839. He also taught the architect James Piers St Aubyn. In 1847 the office moved to College Green.

=== Church architecture ===
Fulljames was diocesan surveyor in Gloucestershire from 1832 until 1870, as Fulljames & Waller from 1846, and in that time they completed a great deal of church architecture in the county. Among his designs was the Church of St Luke, High Orchard (1841), St Matthew's Parish Church, Twigworth (1841–42), adding a north aisle to Hasfield (1849–50), and the reconstruction of the Church of St Lawrence, Sandhurst (1857–58), and the Church of St Mary & Corpus Christi, Down Hatherley (1859–60). After Frederick William Waller became a partner in 1868 the firm was renamed Waller & Son.

=== Severn Barrage ===
In 1849, Fulljames proposed a barrage across the River Severn from Beachley to Aust (now the site of the first Severn Bridge), a span of just over 1 mile (1.6 km). Since this was before commercial electricity production, the first proposals were based on the desire for a large shipping harbour in the Severn Estuary, road and railway transport, and flood protection.

=== Other architecture ===
Other projects by Fulljames in Gloucester include the Albion Hotel (1831) in Southgate Street, later known as Albion House; Norfolk Buildings (1836) in Bristol Road; and the "picturesque Gothic" Gloucester Court of Probate (1858) on the corner of Pitt Street and Park Street, probably as a result of the Court of Probate Act 1857 which removed probate proceedings from the ecclesiastical to the civil courts.

Around 1860 he built Foscombe, a country house in the Gothic Revival style in Ashleworth for his own use. It is now a grade II* listed building.

Plans relating to the Gloucestershire Royal Infirmary and Second County Asylum are held by Gloucestershire Archives.

== Personal life ==
In 1840, Fulljames married Catherine Kirkes at Lancaster. This led to him designing the Custom House Arcade at Liverpool. At first they lived at Maisemore, Gloucestershire but from 1847 to 1863, he was living with his wife at Hasfield Court in Gloucestershire and was described as an "Architect & Landed Proprietor" in the 1851 census. Three relatives were living with them and the family employed seven servants. In the 1861 census, they were described as employing six servants.

== Death and legacy ==
Fulljames died on 24 April 1874 at Foscombe in Ashleworth. His will was proved by his wife Catherine and the executors John Jackson Myers of Huyton, and James Wintle of Newnham. He left less than £12,000. There is a monument to him in the churchyard of the Church of St Mary, Hasfield.

In 1970 and 1987, records relating to Fulljames were among those deposited in the Gloucestershire Archives by the Astam Design Partnership where they had been stored in the attic of the firm's former offices in College Green.
