= Hasfield Court =

Coordinates: 51°56′44″N 2°15′21″W

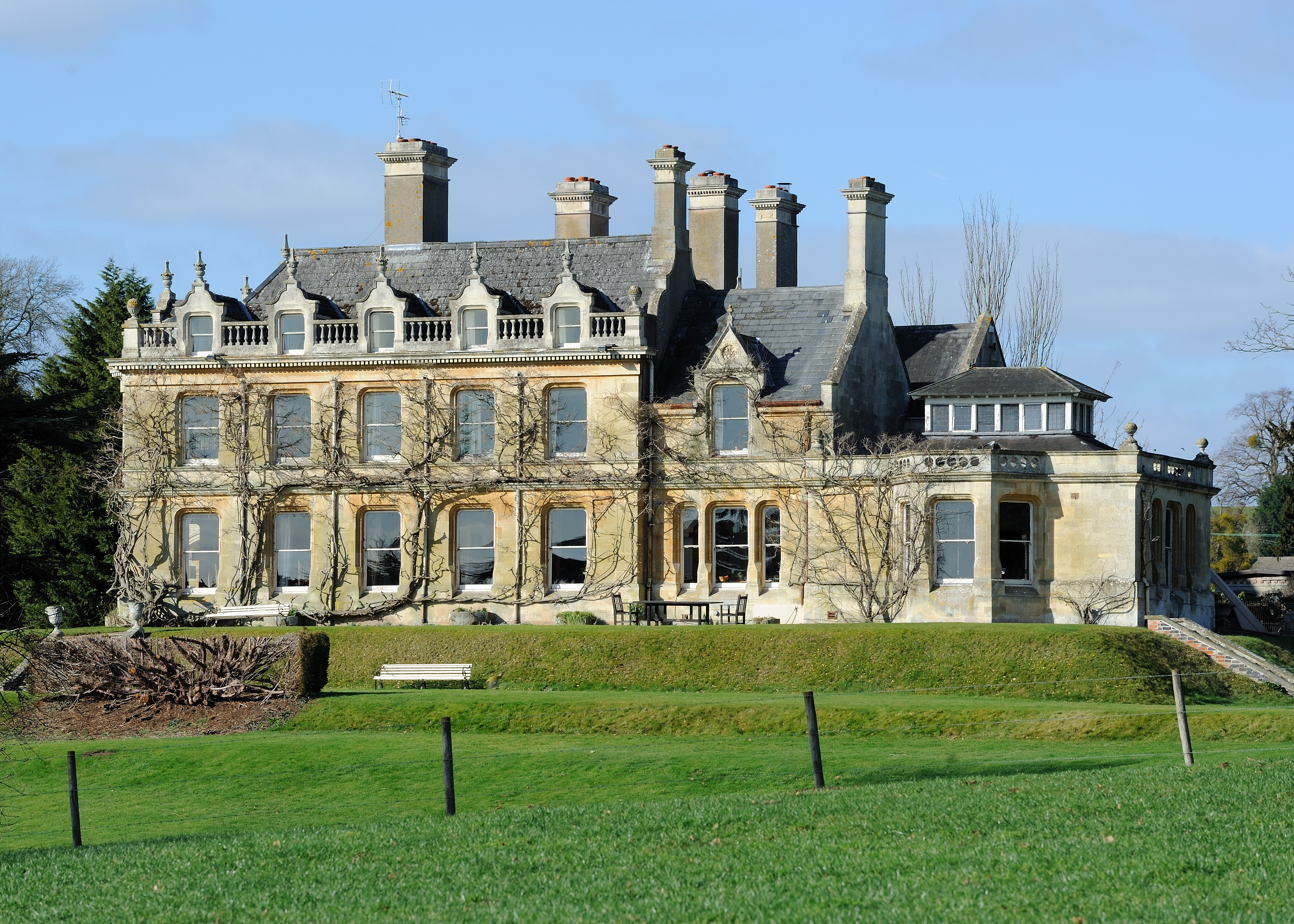
Hasfield Court

Hasfield Court is a Grade II* listed building in Hasfield, Gloucestershire, England.

Hasfield Court was the site of a medieval manor house, the home of the Pauncefoot family from about 1200. It includes Tudor panelling with the initials of Richard (d. 1558) and Dorothy Pauncefoot (d. 1568).

The present house was rebuilt in the late 17th century by John Parker with minor alterations in the 18th and 19th centuries. From 1847 to 1863 the house was owned by the architect Thomas Fulljames and his family.

The house was then sold to and remains in the ownership of the Baker family. It was remodelled and refaced in 1863–65 by William Baker and his brother and successor the Reverend Ralph Bourne Baker and extended in 1888 by William Meath Baker. Edward Elgar was a friend of William Meath Baker and was a frequent visitor to the house; three of the Enigma Variations were based on members of the Baker family.
