= Hasfield =

Civil parish in Gloucestershire, England

Coordinates: 51.94°N 2.25°W

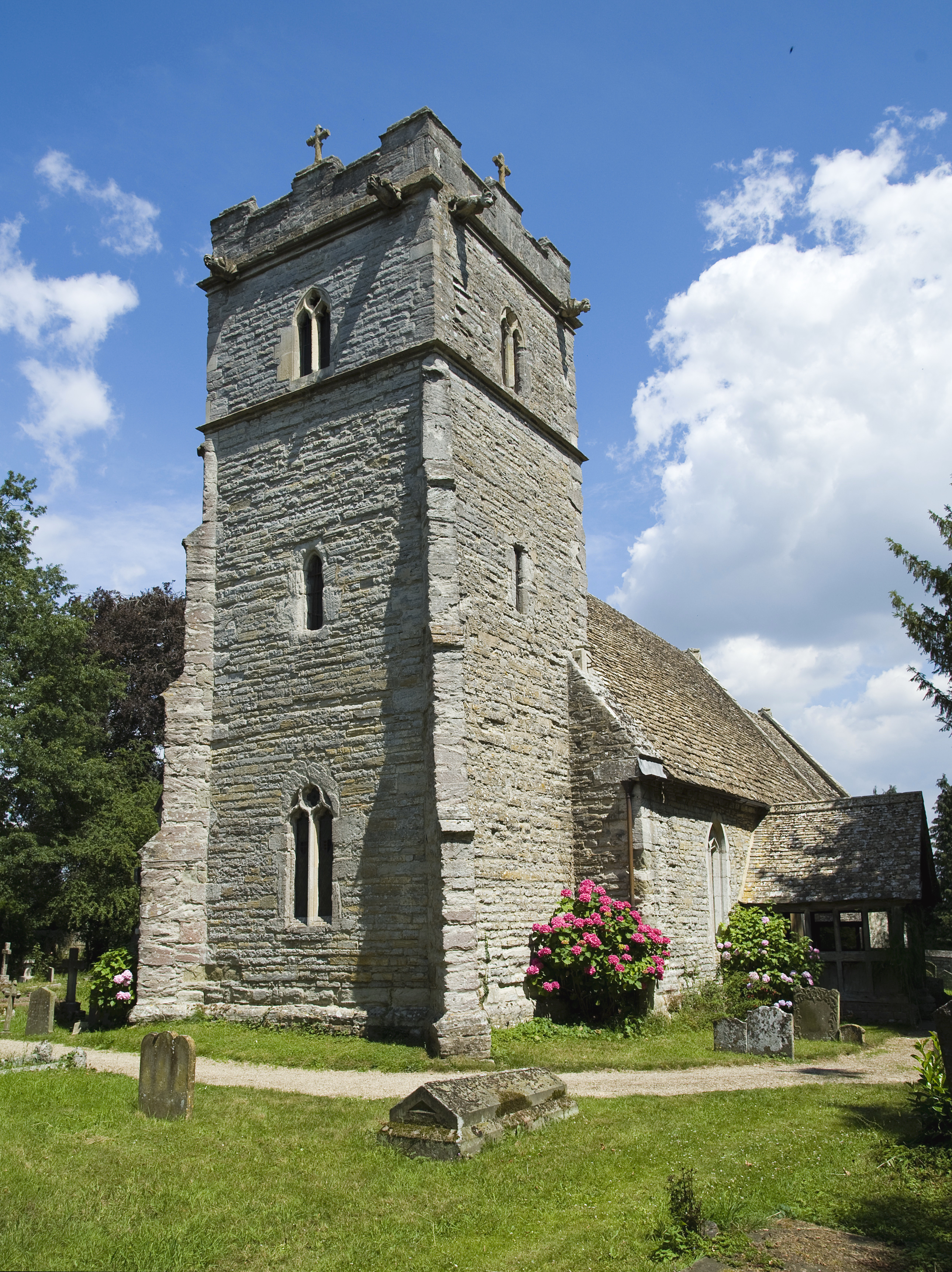
- St Mary's in Hasfield

- Location within Gloucestershire
- Population: 131 (2011)
- OS grid reference: SO 8261427553
- Shire county: Gloucestershire
- Region: South West
- Country: England
- Sovereign state: United Kingdom
- Post town: Gloucester
- Postcode district: GL19
- Police: Gloucestershire
- Fire: Gloucestershire
- Ambulance: South Western
- UK Parliament: Tewkesbury

Hasfield is a civil parish in Gloucestershire, England, and lies six miles (9.7 km) south-west of Tewkesbury and seven miles (11 km) north of Gloucester. It is situated on the west bank of the River Severn; as much of its land resides below the 50-foot contour, it is subject to regular flooding. Hasfield is represented by the county councillor for Severn Vale division and the two borough councillors for Highnam with Haw Bridge ward on Tewkesbury Borough Council.

Hasfield parish is mentioned in the Domesday Book of 1086, noting it had 59 villagers, 54 smallholders and 51 slaves while in 2010 the Gloucestershire County council estimated there were 111 residents. The parish became the seat of the Pauncefootes of Pauncefoote Court in 1199 and remained in their hands until 1598. All that remains of the original manor house appears to be an ancient gateway with several blank escutcheons found near the parish church.

Hasfield Court is built on the same site and it is a heritage building, listed by English Heritage as a Grade II* building. The manor house changed hands several times and once belonged (1847–63) to the architect Thomas Fulljames. The house was sold in 1863 to William Baker, a bachelor, of Fenton House, Staffs. He owned a pottery at Fenton where he built several municipal buildings and Christ Church. His nephew, William Meath Baker, was a patron and friend of Sir Edward Elgar, who based his Enigma Variation no. 4 on him, and nos. 3 and 10, respectively, on WMB's brother-in-law and niece. Hasfield Court remains in the ownership of the Meath Baker family.

== Notable structures ==
The Parish Church, called St. Peter's when it was established in the 14th century, is now dedicated to St. Mary. It has a square tower which still retains the earlier dedication to St Peter. The tower, which houses the church's four bells, is decorated with crenellations and gargoyle-like figures that double as waterspouts. Inside the church are numerous notable artifacts, including several stained glass windows, a Norman font, and a monument to lady Pauncefort for sending her "right hand" to Palestine to ransom her lord from the infidels. English Heritage has listed St Mary's as a Grade I heritage building.

The Old Rectory as it is now called, situated next to St Mary's, was constructed in 1837 and retains much of its original character. The rather grand and large Tudor-Gothic building, in private hands since 1957, is constructed of yellow limestone and adorned with several gables and bay windows. The Old Rectory is an English Heritage Grade II listed building. A new rectory was built off-site.

The Great House of Hasfield is an English Heritage Grade I listed building. The exterior presents rather unusually in that it is constructed in three styles, with various sections being primarily of brick, or of stone, and yet others of timber-framing. The yellow-sandstone centre part of the house was the earliest constructed (late 16th century). The north side is mostly reddish brick and some stone. It was reported the timber-framed west wing was added in the 19th century to improve the sight view from Hasfield Court, with which it shares ownership.

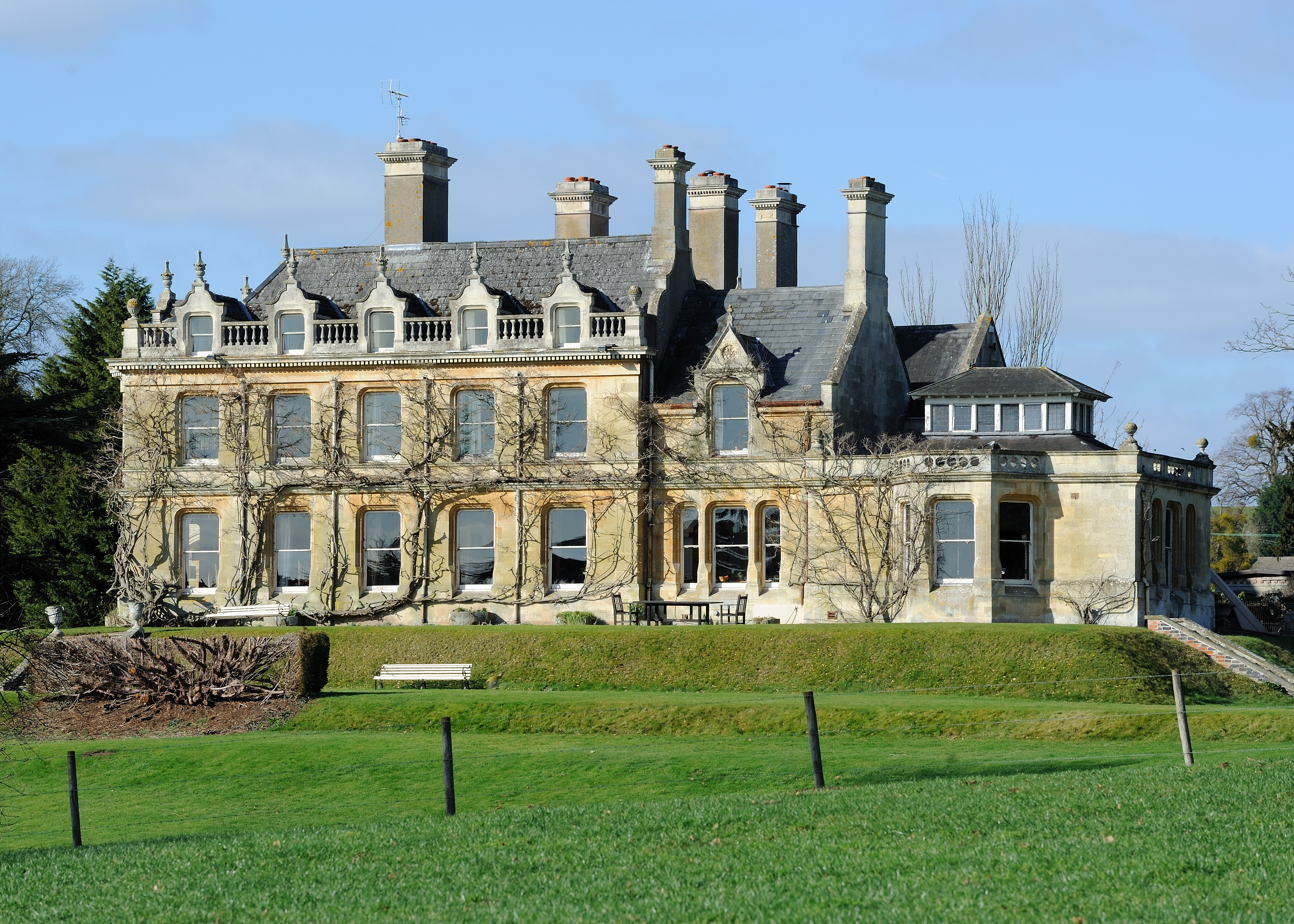
Hasfield Court

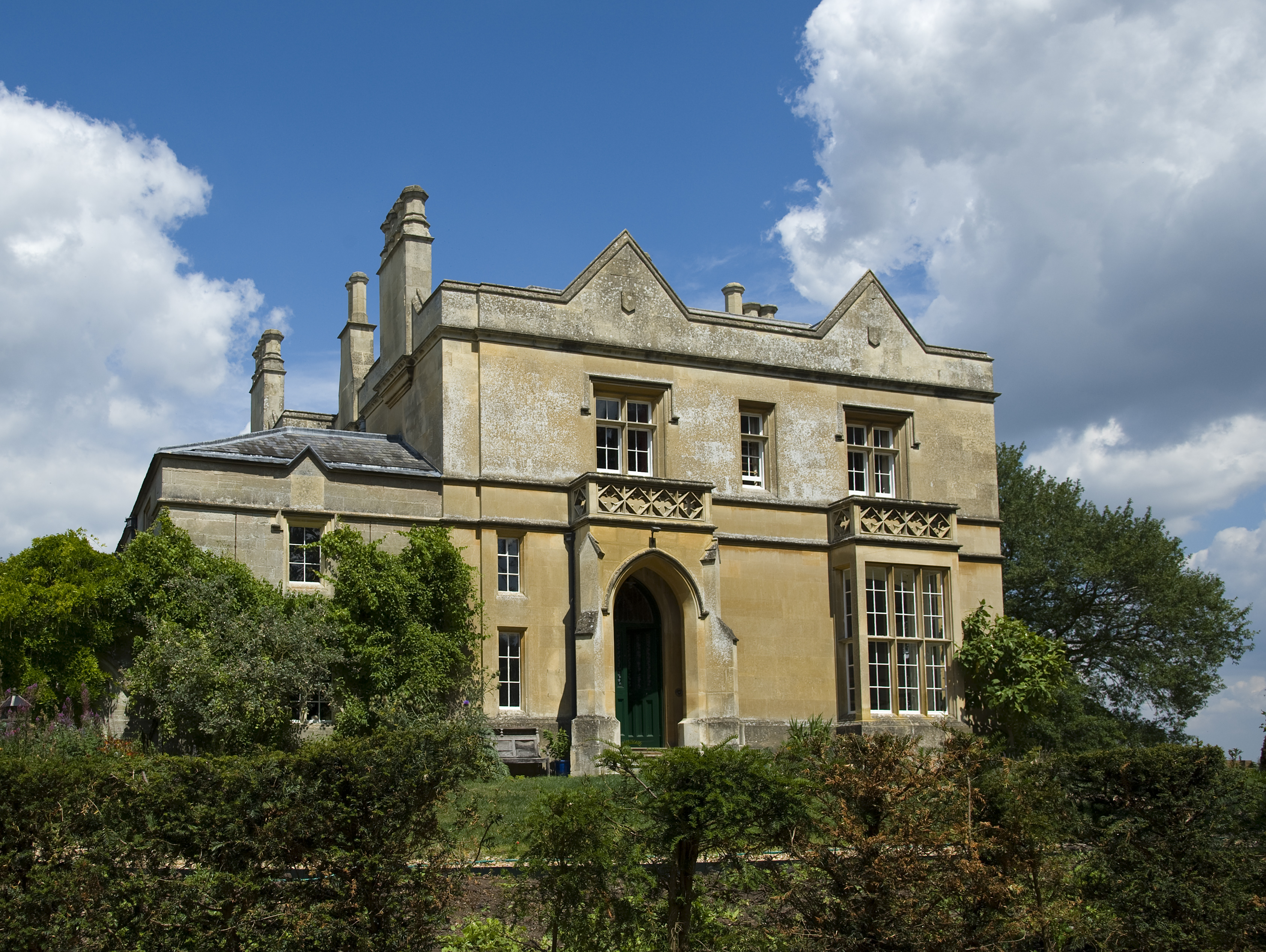
The Old Rectory

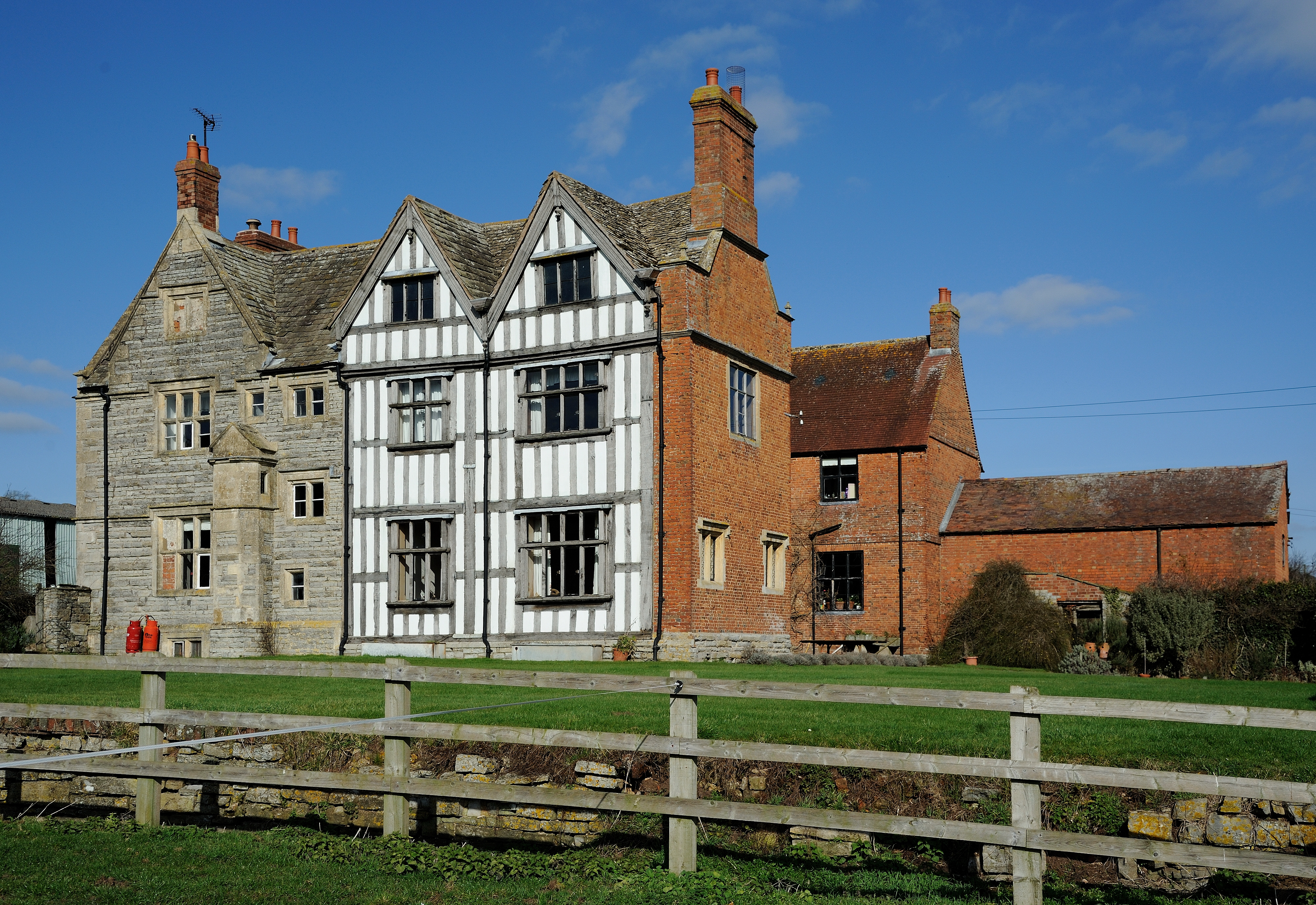
The Great House

== Notable people ==
- William Meath Baker of Hasfield Court - High Sheriff of Gloucestershire in 1896.

== See also ==
- Hasfield Court
