= Samuel Lysons (priest) =

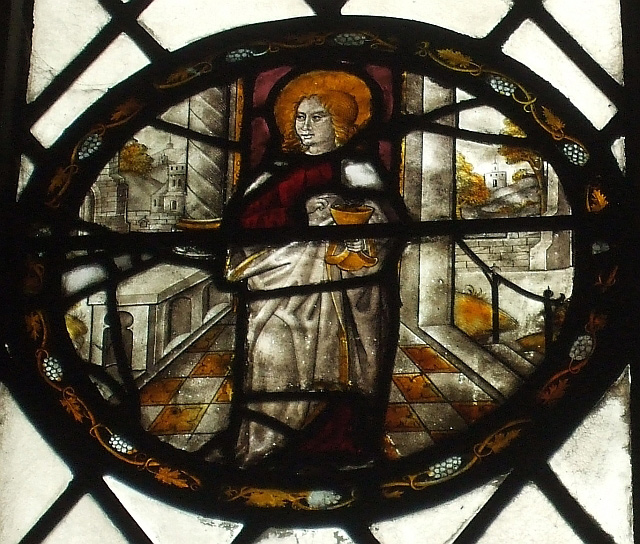
Stained glass formerly at St Luke's, High Orchard, now in Holy Trinity Church, Longlevens.

Samuel Lysons FSA (17 March 1806 – 27 March 1877) was an antiquarian and early proponent of British Israelism.

== Early life ==
Samuel Lysons was born on 17 March 1806, the eldest surviving son of Daniel Lysons. His uncle was the English engraver Samuel Lysons.

The Lyson's family was prominent and well known within Gloucestershire from the 17th century onwards, having connections with the parishes of Rodmarton and Cherington.

== Career ==
Samuel Lysons became rector of Rodmarton of which he was patron, in 1833. In 1841 he arranged the construction of Church of St Luke in the expanding area of Gloucester known as High Orchard. He resigned in 1866. From November 1865 he was rural dean of Gloucester and two years later he was appointed as an honorary canon of Gloucester Cathedral.

He was also a successful author; his Our British Ancestors (1865) received good reviews and was considered an early text on British Israelism. He was a fellow of the Society of Antiquaries of London (FSA), and a member of the Archaeological Institute and the Cotteswold Naturalists' Society.

== Personal life ==
He married three times and had six children, all by his first wife, Eliza Sophia Moore. He died on 27 March 1877 and was buried at Rodmarton.

== Selected publications ==
- Conjectures concerning the Identity of the Patriarch Job, his Family, the time in which he lived, and the Locality of the Land of Uz. Oxford, 1832.
- The Romans in Gloucestershire, and the results of their Residence in this Country, considered in an Historical, Social, and Religious point of view. London, 1860.
- The Model Merchant of the Middle Ages, Exemplified in the Story of Whittington and his Cat, being an attempt to rescue that interesting story from the region of fable &c. London, 1860.
- Claudia and Pudens; or the early Christians in Gloucester; a Tale of the first Century. London, 1861.
- Gloucestershire Illustrations. No. 1. Machin and Madeira: an Attempt to investigate the Truth of the Discovery … of that Island. Gloucester, 1861. (No more was published)
- What has Gloucestershire achieved? Being an enumeration of some of the principal points in which that County has taken a prominent lead in matters Religious, Moral, … and Scientific. Gloucester, 1861.
- Our British Ancestors: Who and What Were They? An inquiry serving to elucidate the traditional History of the Early Britons by means of recent Excavations, Etymology, … Inscriptions, Craniology, &c. John Henry & James Parker, Oxford & London; J. Headland, Gloucester, 1865.
- Our Vulgar Tongue. A Lecture on Language in general, with a few Words on Gloucestershire in particular. … With Appendix containing Tables of the world-wide Affinity of Languages. London, 1868.
