= Harold Stratton Davis =

English architect

Harold Stratton Davis MC FSA (1885–1969) was an architect in Gloucestershire who specialised in churches, vicarages and rectories. He won the Military Cross during the First World War while serving with the Royal Engineers.

== Military service ==
Stratton Davis began his military career as an enlisted soldier. He was promoted from lance-corporal in the Royal Engineers, South Midland Divisional Engineers, to second lieutenant in October 1915. He was awarded the Military Cross in 1918 when he was lieutenant, acting major, for:

...conspicuous gallantry and devotion to duty in organising the digging of a line of posts under heavy machine-gun fire and visiting them all at great personal risk. On another occasion he displayed great determination and courage in collecting and assisting to reorganise, under artillery and machine-gun fire, the troops which had passed through the line of posts held by his company.

== Architecture ==
Stratton Davis was articled to John Fletcher Trew of Gloucester but set up on his own account in 1913. Charles William Yates later joined him in partnership.

Stratton Davis practised as an architect in Gloucester as Stratton Davis & Dolman. On the death of Edward J. Dolman in 1935 the firm became Stratton Davis & Yates. It had previously taken over the practice of Walter B. Wood in the late 1920s when Dolman, the senior assistant, had joined the firm. He was a fellow of the Society of Antiquaries (FSA) and served as Diocesan Surveyor for 26 years until retiring in 1949. His son, David Stratton Davis, joined the practice as an apprentice in 1935; he became a partner and continued the practice, dealing mainly with ecclesiastical work. One notable exception is the Inch housing estate in Edinburgh. The firm merged with ASTAM of Gloucester in 1998. The records of Stratton Davis & Yates are held at Gloucestershire Archives.

Among his notable work is Grade II listed Holy Trinity Church, Longlevens, (1933–34) which he designed in a fifteenth-century Perpendicular Gothic style along with most of the interior fittings. Stratton Davis designed a memorial chapel for Christ Church on Brunswick Road in Gloucester in 1950. Stratton Davis designed a temporary timber church in 1928 that was subsequently expanded and now serves as the church hall for St Aldate's in Gloucester. He also designed a number of vicarages and rectories and his firm was recorded as diocesan architects for Newent in 1932.

Outside architecture, he was secretary and treasurer of the Bristol and Gloucestershire Archaeological Trust.

== Selected publications ==
- Cox, John Charles. (1949) Gloucestershire. (Eighth edition) London: Methuen & B.T. Batsford. (Reviser)
