= Ralph Hart Tweddell =

British engineer (1843-1895)

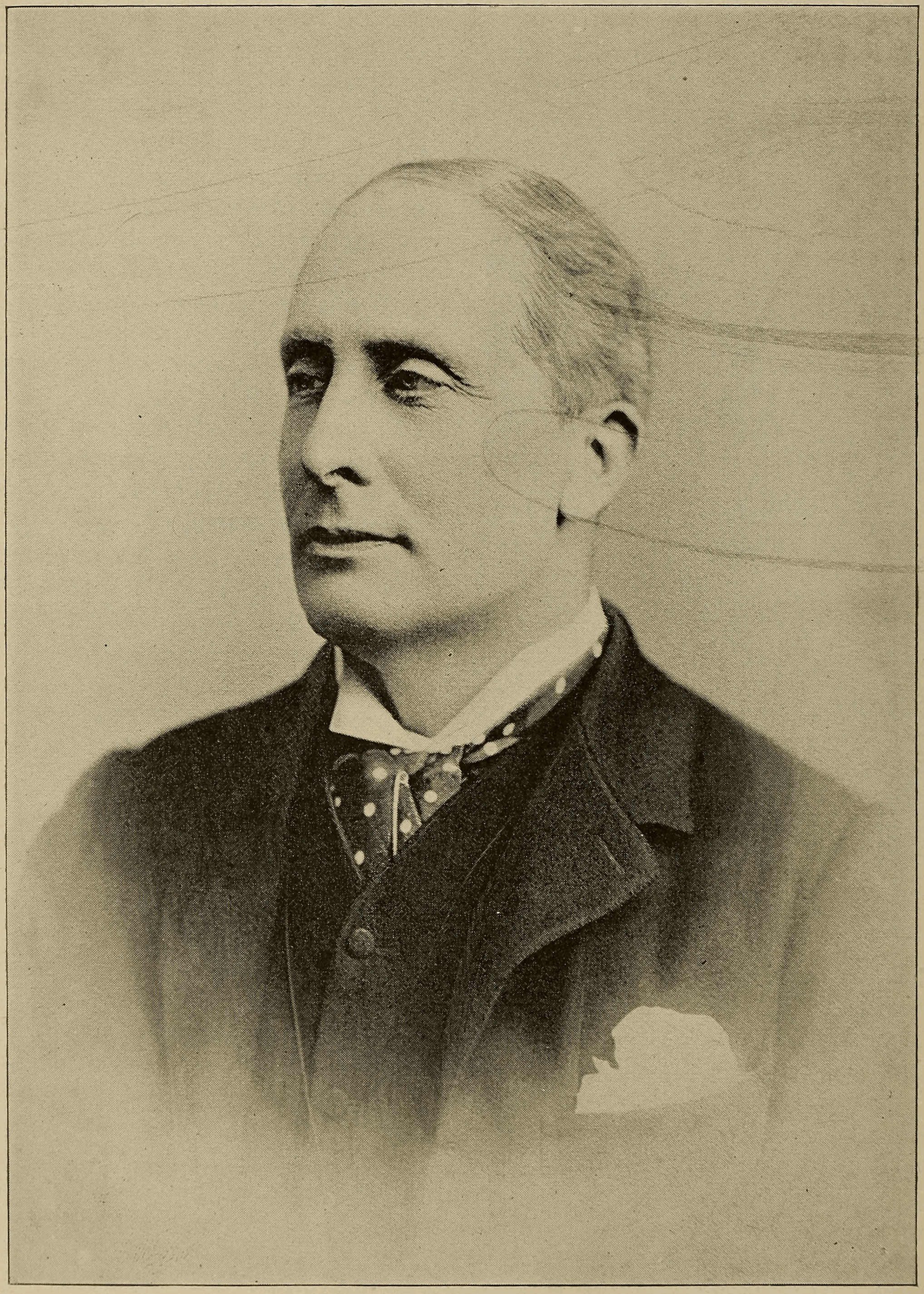
Ralph Hart Tweddell was featured in an article in Cassier's Magazine in January 1895, accompanied by this photo.

Ralph Hart Tweddell (25 May 1843 – 3 September 1895) was a British mechanical engineer, known particularly for inventing the portable hydraulic riveter, which greatly facilitated the construction of boilers, bridges and ships.

== Early life ==
Tweddell was born in South Shields in 1843. His father, Marshall Tweddell, was a shipowner. He was educated at Cheltenham College, with the intention of entering the army. However, more interested in engineering, he was apprenticed to R and W Hawthorn, a locomotive manufacturer in Newcastle upon Tyne.

During his apprenticeship he took out a patent in 1865 for a portable hydraulic apparatus for fixing the ends of boiler tubes in tube plates. The encouraging results suggested that hydraulic power should be used for machines used in boiler construction.

In 1865 he designed a stationary hydraulic riveting machine. This was more effective than the existing mechanical riveting machines, which usually did not make steam-tight joints in the boilers of steamships, which were by then operating under higher pressure than before. The plant, consisting of a pump, an accumulator, and a riveter, was first used by Thompson, Boyd & Co., of Newcastle.

== The portable riveter ==
In 1871 Tweddell invented a portable riveter, so that the work did not have to be brought to the machine. It was manufactured by Fielding & Platt; an early user was Armstrong, Mitchell and Company in Newcastle. In 1873 it was used in riveting a lattice girder bridge carrying Primrose Street over the Great Eastern railway at Bishopsgate railway station in London. The success of this led to its use in the construction of other bridges.

The portable riveter was first used for locomotive work by F. W. Webb at Crewe Works. It was also used for agricultural machinery, for underframes of railway carriages, and by the Italian government for gun-carriages. In France, Tweddell's system was used when in 1874 the French government began to build iron warships in Toulon, and it was later used at the shipyard at Penhoët near Saint-Nazaire, and at Brest.

In 1885 he was awarded a gold medal, under the Howard Trust, at the International Inventions Exhibition in South Kensington for "his system of applying hydraulic power to the working of machine tools, and for the rivetting and other machines which he has invented in connection with that system".

He wrote the paper "On Machine Tools and Labour-saving Appliances worked by Hydraulic Pressure" for the Institution of Civil Engineers, for which he was awarded the Telford Medal and premium in 1883. He sent three papers to the Institution of Mechanical Engineers including "On the Application of Water Pressure to Shop-tools and Mechanical Engineering Works". In 1890 a paper entitled "The Application of Water Pressure to Machine Tools and Appliances" was awarded a Bessemer Premium by the Society of Engineers.

He became a member of the Institution of Mechanical Engineers in 1867. From 1879 he was a member of the Institution of Civil Engineers. He was also a member of the Société des ingénieurs civils de France from 1879.

In 1875 Tweddell married Hannah Mary Grey. In his spare time he was interested in hunting, shooting and fishing. He died in 1895 at his home near Gravesend in Kent, two years after a riding accident which affected his health.
