= David Stratton Davis =

English architect (1917–2000)

Davis Isaac Stratton Davis
- Born: 1917
- Died: 2000 (aged 82–83)
- Education: Royal West of England Academy School of Architecture, Bristol
- Occupation: Architect
- Era: 20th century
- Employer(s): Stratton Davis & Yates (family firm)

Davis Isaac Stratton Davis (1917–2000) was born in 1917, the son of Major Harold Stratton Davis and his wife Amy Buckingham Webb. He trained as an architect at the Royal West of England Academy School of Architecture in Bristol and joined the family firm Stratton Davis & Yates. He was elected an Associate of the RIBA in 1940. In 1946 he won the competition to design a new council estate at The Inch in Edinburgh. Apart from this he followed the firm's noted skills in ecclesiastical work.

He died in 2000.
