= High Orchard Bridge =

Bridge in Gloucester, England

Coordinates: 51.858768°N 2.256072°W

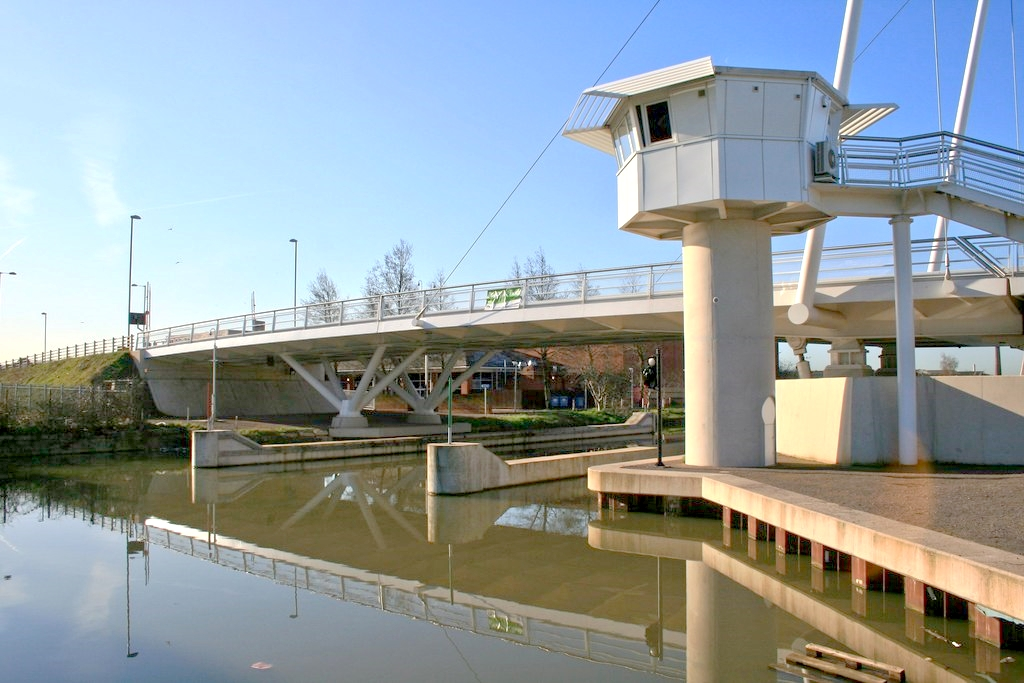
High Orchard Bridge

High Orchard Bridge is a bascule bridge over the Gloucester and Sharpness Canal in High Orchard in the city of Gloucester, England. It was opened in 2008 to carry the newly constructed St Ann Way over the canal. In 2012, Marstons pub company opened a brand new pub on the land next to the bridge and named it after the bridge “The High Orchard” which has since gone on to be one of Gloucester’s busiest pubs.

== See also ==
- Llanthony Road Bridge
