= Ravenswood standing stone =

Menhir in Edinburgh, Scotland

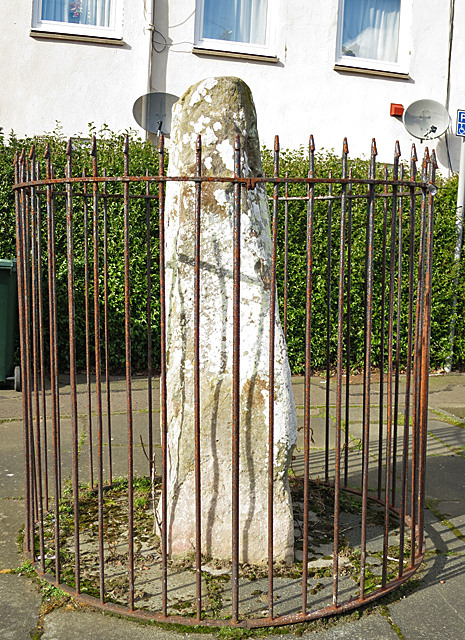
- The stone in 2017 looking northwest
- Interactive map of Ravenswood standing stone
- 55°55′20″N 3°08′57″W
- Type: Standing Stone
- Location: The Inch, Edinburgh, Scotland

History
- Built: c. 2000 BC

Site notes
- Material: Sandstone
- Height: 1.85 m (6 ft 1 in)
- Public access: Yes

Scheduled monument
- Official name: Liberton standing stone
- Type: Prehistoric ritual and funerary: standing stone
- Designated: 18 October 1938
- Reference no.: SM1156

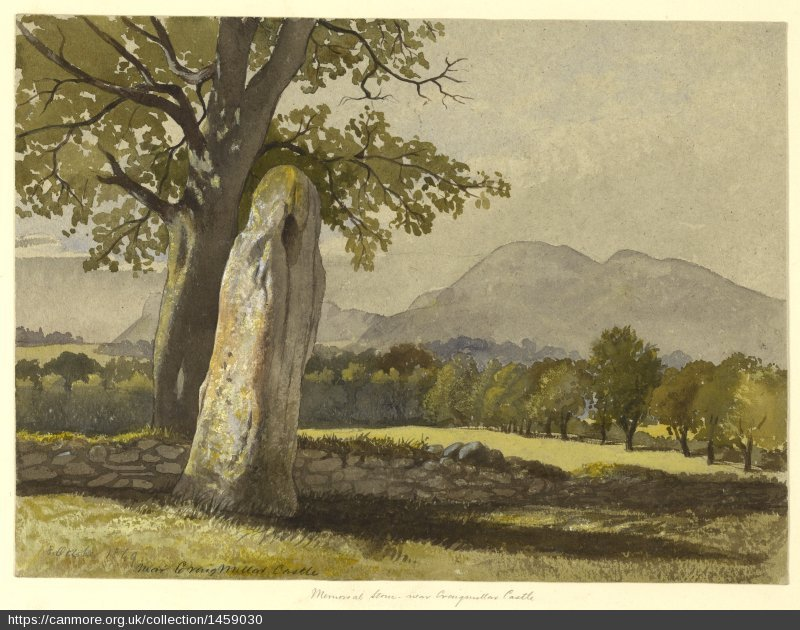
An 1849 depiction of the stone

A 1903 drawing from the southeast

The Ravenswood standing stone is an ancient monument in The Inch, Edinburgh, Scotland. Erected around 2000 BC, it is a menhir that may mark the site of an ancient battle or have had a ritual use. It was moved in the early 19th-century for a road scheme, but returned to its original location in 1891. It was moved again in 1971 and now sits in a cul-de-sac on a housing estate, protected by metal railings. It is 1.85 metres (6 ft 1 in) high.

== Description ==
The stone stands in the footway at the north-west side of the cul-de-sac at the eastern end of Ravenswood Avenue in The Inch in Edinburgh. It is set into concrete and stands at 1.85 metres (6 ft 1 in) high. The stone measures 70 centimetres (28 in) in diameter at its base and tapers towards the top. The stone is formed of grey sandstone containing some quartz crystals. It has natural erosion grooves on the east and west faces and a large, ear-shaped, naturally-formed cavity on the east face. The stone has no manmade markings.

It is similar in composition and appearance to the Auchencorth gowk stane near Penicuik. Because of its situation, in the middle of a modern housing estate, it has been said that it "might be Britain's most urban standing stone".

The original purpose of the stone is not known, but it may commemorate an ancient battle or have been used for ritualistic purposes. Historic Environment Scotland note that the stone no longer has any archaeological potential as it has been moved, but remains worthy of protection due to its cultural significance.

== History ==
The standing stone was erected around 2000 BC. The monument originally stood in what is now Liberton glebe, Scotland, around 60 metres (66 yd) south-west of where the Old Dalkeith Road (A7) is today, around 61 metres (200 ft) above sea level. The stone was moved in the early 19th-century to facilitate a road scheme, but was restored to its original location in 1891.

The stone was surveyed in 1903 and noted to have four faces; the principal face was aligned approximately five degrees east of north (i.e., facing approximately east). This face measured 0.64 metres (2 ft 1 in) in width at ground level, the north face measured 0.51 metres (1 ft 8 in), and the south and west sides both measured 0.56 metres (1 ft 10 in). Together with an additional corner face of around 110 millimetres (4.5 in) this gave a total circumference of around 2.4 metres (8 ft). The stone tapered to a circumference of 1.42 metres (4 ft 8 in) at the top, which was 1.994 metres (6 ft 6.5 in) above ground level. A measurement in 1929 recorded that the stone had a circumference of 1.96 metres (6 ft 5 in) at a point 0.91 metres (3 ft) above ground level. The stone received statutory protection as a scheduled monument on 18 October 1938.

Around 1971, a new housing estate was built on the site. The stone was moved around 100 metres (330 ft) north of its original position to facilitate this. At this time the stone was set into a concrete foundation and a metal railing erected around it. The cul-de-sac and stone became a meeting point for locals and until recent times was the site of a large bonfire on Guy Fawkes Night. Children also used the railings as a basket-style target for footballs. The schedule of protection was amended on 19 December 2002 to cover the new area of the stone, within a circle of diameter 0.7 metres (2 ft 4 in); as such it omits the railings.
