= Gloucester Quays =

Shopping centre in Gloucestershire, England

Gloucester Quays Designer Outlet Centre
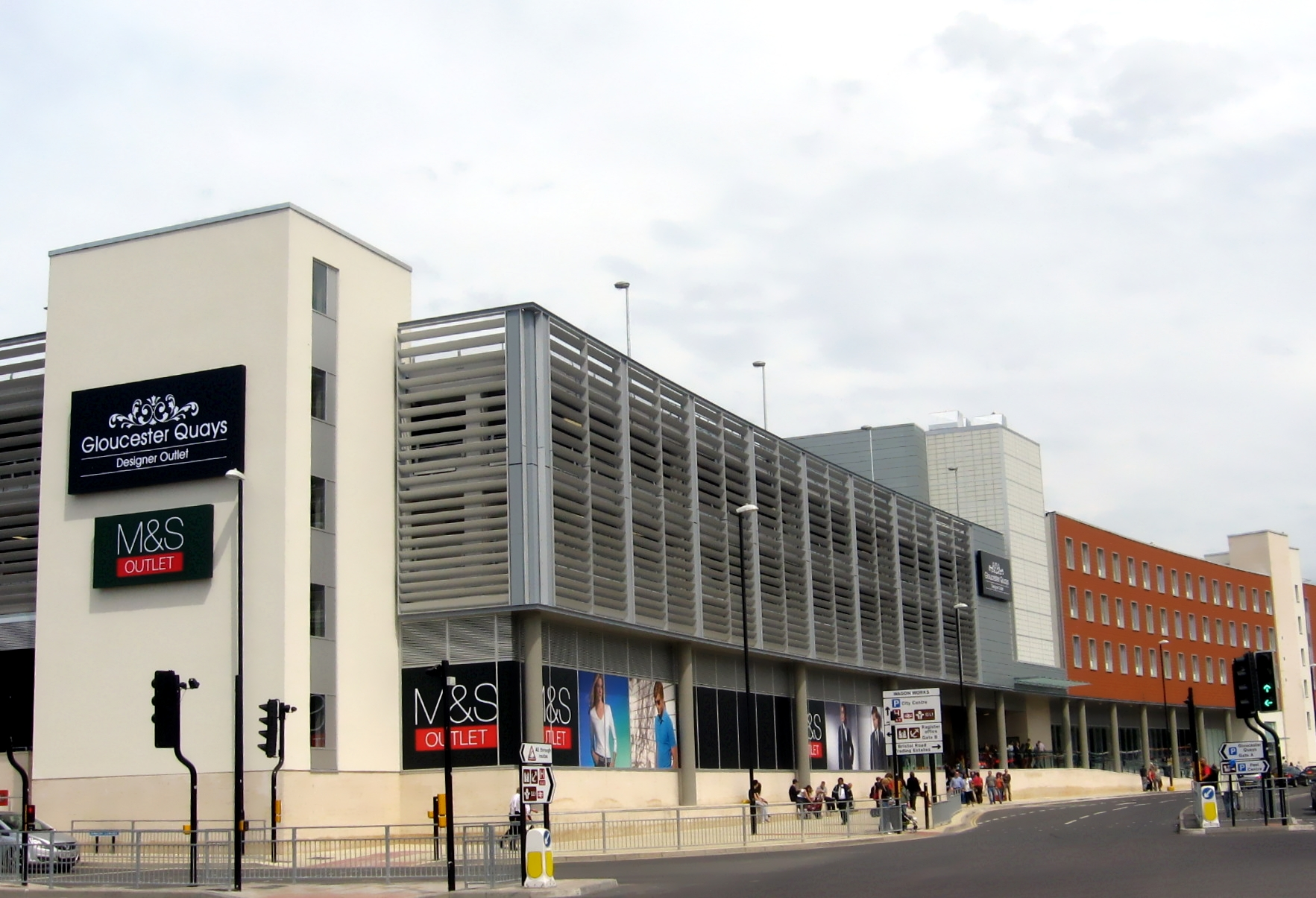
- Exterior view (May 2009)
- Location: Gloucester, Gloucestershire, England
- Coordinates: 51.8594298°N 2.2524778°W
- Address: St Ann Way
- Opened: 21 May 2009; 17 years ago (first phase); 5 December 2013; 12 years ago (second phase)
- Developer: Vinci Construction
- Owner: The Peel Group
- Architect: Bourne Group
- Num. of stores: 123
- Num. of anchor tenants: 50
- Floor area: 150,000 square metres (1,600,000 sq ft)
- Floors: 1
- Parking: 1,400
- Public transit: 8,9,10,12,60
- Website: gloucesterquays.co.uk

Gloucester Quays (also known as Gloucester Quays Designer Outlet Centre) is an outlet shopping centre on St Ann Way, Gloucester, in the area of the city formerly known as High Orchard. The outlet is situated close to Gloucester Docks, a historic area of the city.

== Construction of Gloucester Quays ==
The outlet centre was built on the former site of Fielding & Platt engineering works which opened in 1866, specialising in hydraulic machinery and hydraulic presses. By the 1980s the business declined, in the 1990s it was taken over by Motherwell Bridge Ltd and shortly afterwards closed down.

In May 2007, preparation of the site was started. Unwanted buildings were demolished but the former Matthews furniture factory was left intact and is now part of the outlet centre. By October 2007, construction had started and three cranes were erected on the site by November 2007. The upper level of the centre was started on 6 May 2008, it was designed with a distinctive gull-wing shaped steel and glass roof over the central courtyard which was installed around the end of August 2008.

In February 2009, the interior of the Outlet centre was well under way. On 1 July 2009, the south-east side of the outlet centre was opened up as a 96-room Travelodge.

In November 2011 as part of Phase 2, a planning development was granted to convert the first floor and roof to a 10-screen cinema. Permission was also granted to convert blocks L, M, N and P of the ground floor to restaurants and take-aways.

In April 2017, the £141 million development of Bakers Quay began. The development, by Rokeby Merchant Developments (Gloucester) Limited, will take place in 2 phases. Phase one will consist of 47 apartments, a 104 bedroom Premier Inn, Brewers Fayre restaurant, a drive-through Costa Coffee and 4 three bedroom houses. Phase 2 will consist of another 73 apartments. The first phase was completed in August 2018 and the second phase should be completed by December 2019.

== History ==
On 30 May 2009, Gloucester Quays was opened by Gok Wan. But it opened up with only 40 stores with a further 16 being let in the upcoming weeks.

Initially, between May 2009 and November 2010, the centre failed to meet expectations with fewer customers than predicted. This was due to the fact that it opened during the middle of an economic recession. However, despite the initial struggles the outlet centre continued to expand adding spaces for 37 new businesses.

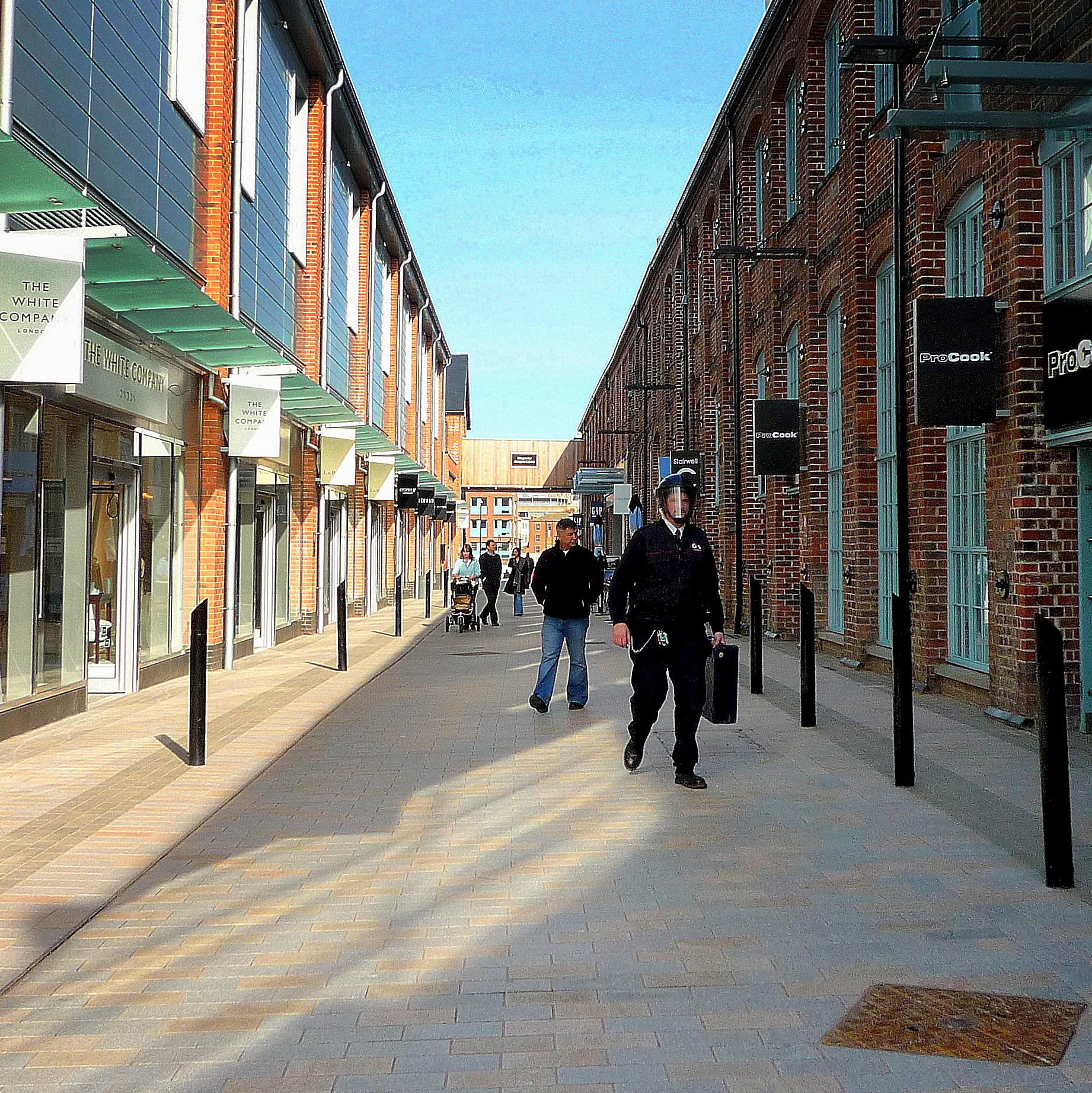
A shopping outlet area which has been incorporated with the old warehouses in Gloucester Docks

On 5 December 2013, in a £60 million Quayside development, the nearby Cineworld moved from the Peel Centre across the road into the Quays and was renamed Cineworld Gloucester Quays. It is a fully digitalised 10-screen cinema complex with a 1,600-seat capacity. Also at this time, another 11 new restaurants and bars were opened including Zizzi's and Chimichanga.

Since January 2015, 14 more stores and restaurants have opened including Clarks, Skechers, Jaeger, Brewhouse & Kitchen, Bella Italia and Bill's. In November 2015, Fat Face, Bench, Tricker's shoes and Carluccio's opened at the Quays.

On 3 October 2015, a fire took place in the Provender Mill which was one of the most iconic buildings in Gloucester. Two teenagers were charged with arson. The fire caused £2 million worth of damage and took 10 fire engines and 45 firefighters to put out.

Between June and November 2017, Ted Baker, Jack Wills, Timberland and Joules opened at the centre.

In December 2017, Explore Learning a children's tuition centre opened. It was also announced that Cath Kidston Limited would open in the New Year. The following month, it was confirmed they would be opening on 18 January 2018.

In March 2018, it was announced that Peel Holdings would invest another £100 million into the Quays. The funds will be used to add a second floor to the shopping centre and revamp the surrounding outdoor squares.

== Markets ==
Since the centre has opened, there have been annual food festivals and Victorian Christmas markets.
