= Church of St Luke, Gloucester =

Church in Gloucester, England

Coordinates: 51°51′34″N 2°15′06″W

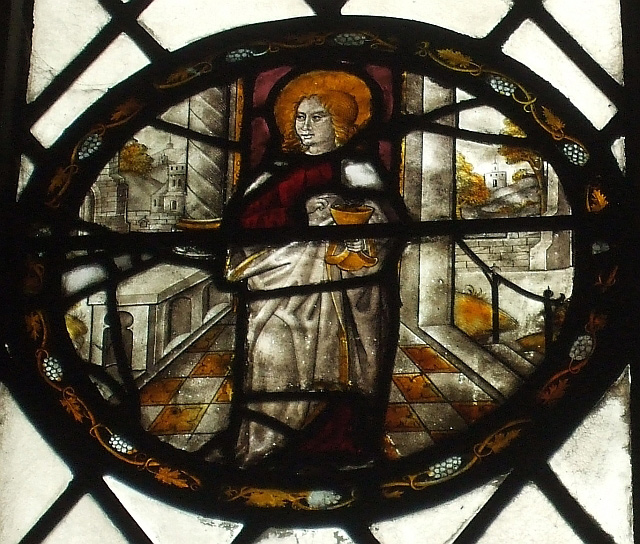
A stained glass window from St Luke's now in Holy Trinity Church, Longlevens.

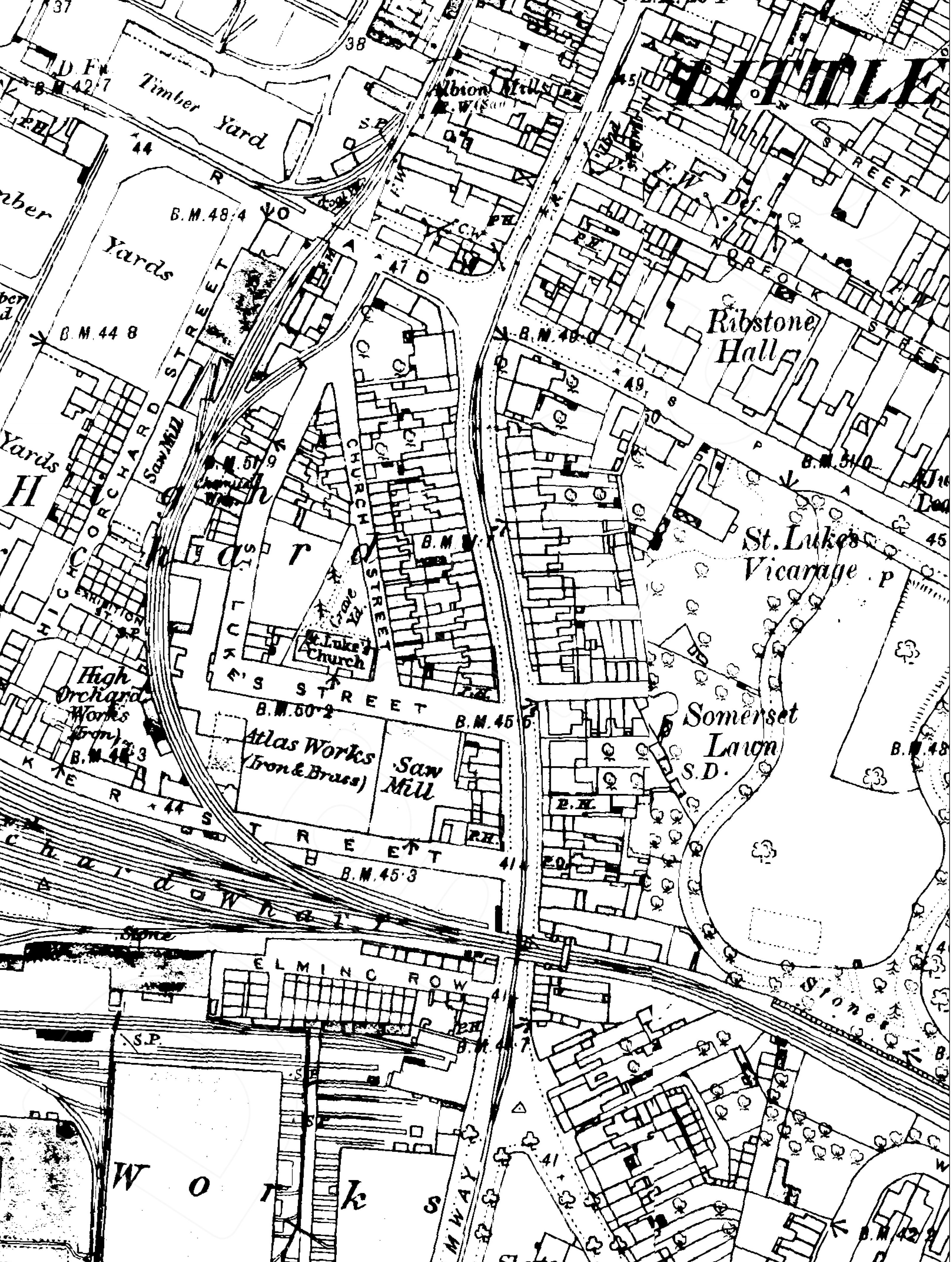
St Luke's Church (centre) within High Orchard, Gloucester, on a c.1880 Ordnance Survey map.

The Church of St Luke, High Orchard, Gloucester, was a Church of England church built and endowed by the Reverend Samuel Lysons, rector of Rodmarton, who was also the first minister.

== History ==
The church was designed by the architect Thomas Fulljames of Gloucester in what The Gentleman's Magazine described as "a neat structure in the later style of Early English". It was consecrated in 1841.

The first minister was Samuel Lysons, rector of Rodmarton. He resigned in 1866.

The curate in 1846 was Lewis Alexander Beck.

St Luke's was demolished in 1934 and stained glass from the building, much of it German or Dutch of the 15th to the 18th centuries, was reused at Holy Trinity Church, Longlevens.
