= Llanthony Road Bridge =

Bridge over a canal in Gloucester, England

Coordinates: 51.8616°N 2.2536°W

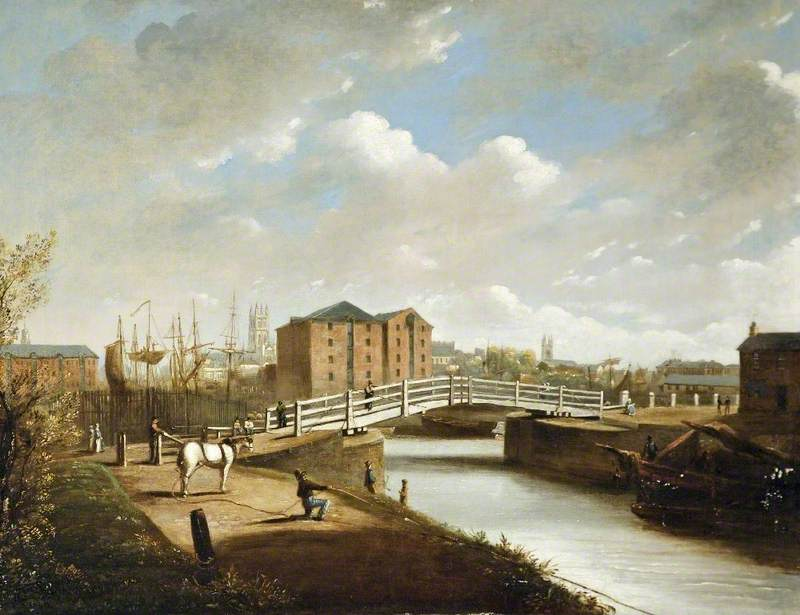
Llanthony Bridge, Gloucester by Edward Smith, n.d. Oil on canvas, Museum of Gloucester.

Llanthony Road Bridge is a bridge over the Gloucester and Sharpness Canal in the Gloucester Docks and High Orchard area. It is the third bridge on the site. It is prohibited for cars to cross the bridge, only allowing taxis, Buses and Bicycles. One third of the bridge's width is taken up by a walking path on the same side as the Bridge tender's house and facing away from the High Orchard Bridge further along the canal

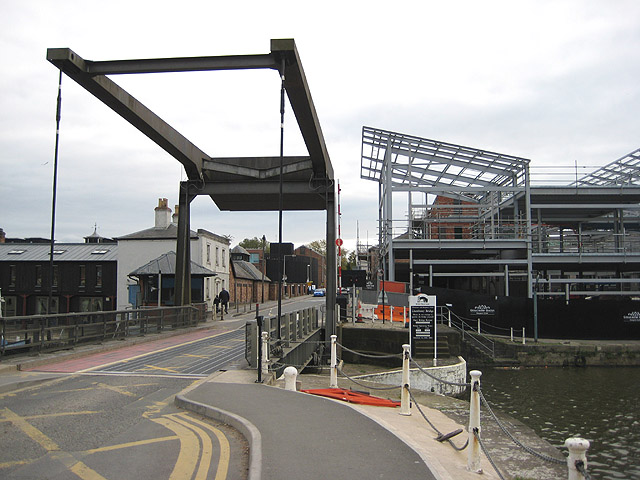
Llanthony Road Bridge looking east along Llanthony Road

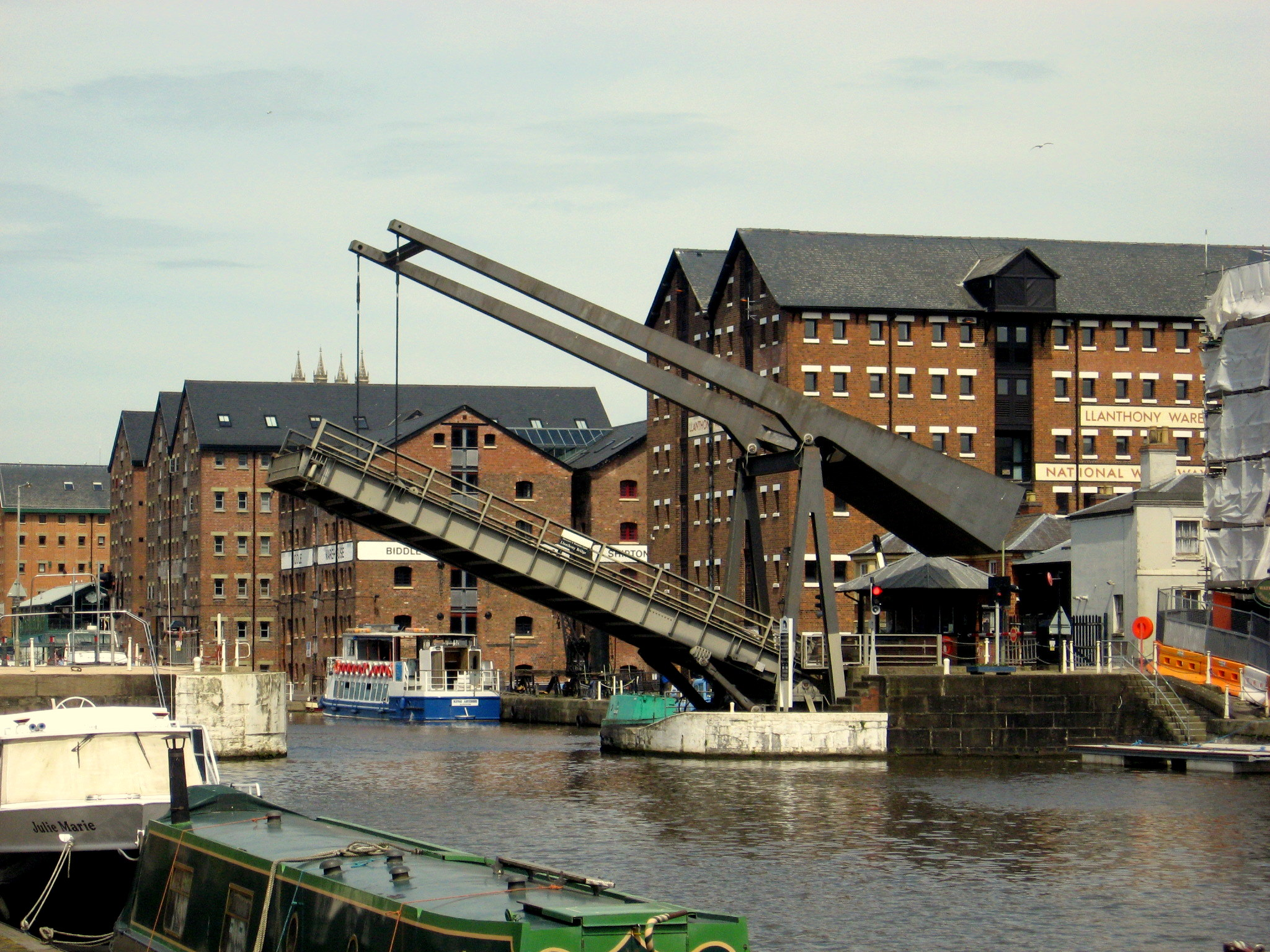
Llanthony Road Bridge looking north

== See also ==
- High Orchard Bridge
