= High Orchard =

Industrial area in Gloucester, England

Coordinates: 51.858768°N 2.256072°W

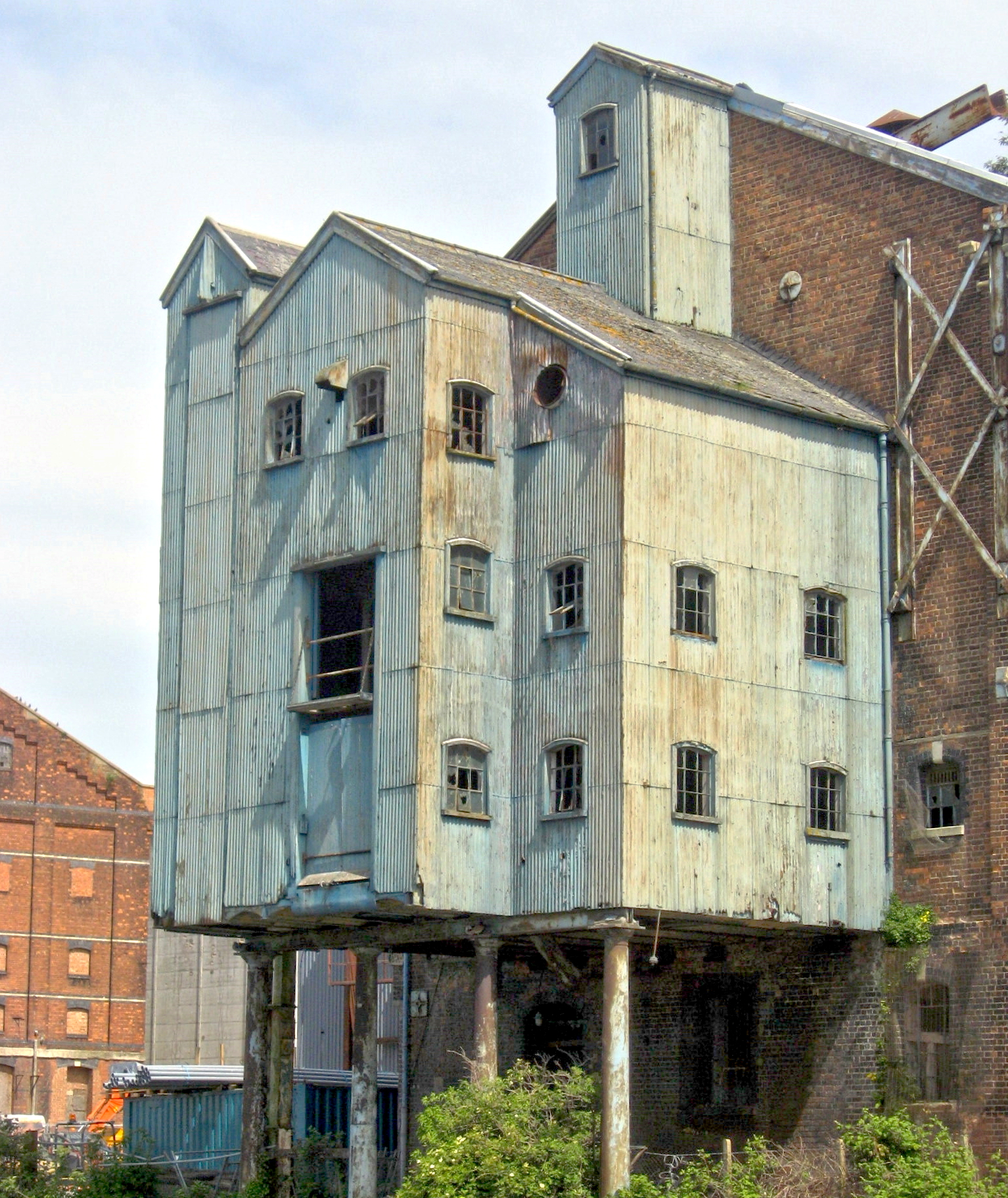
Llanthony Provender Mill, 2009, canalside

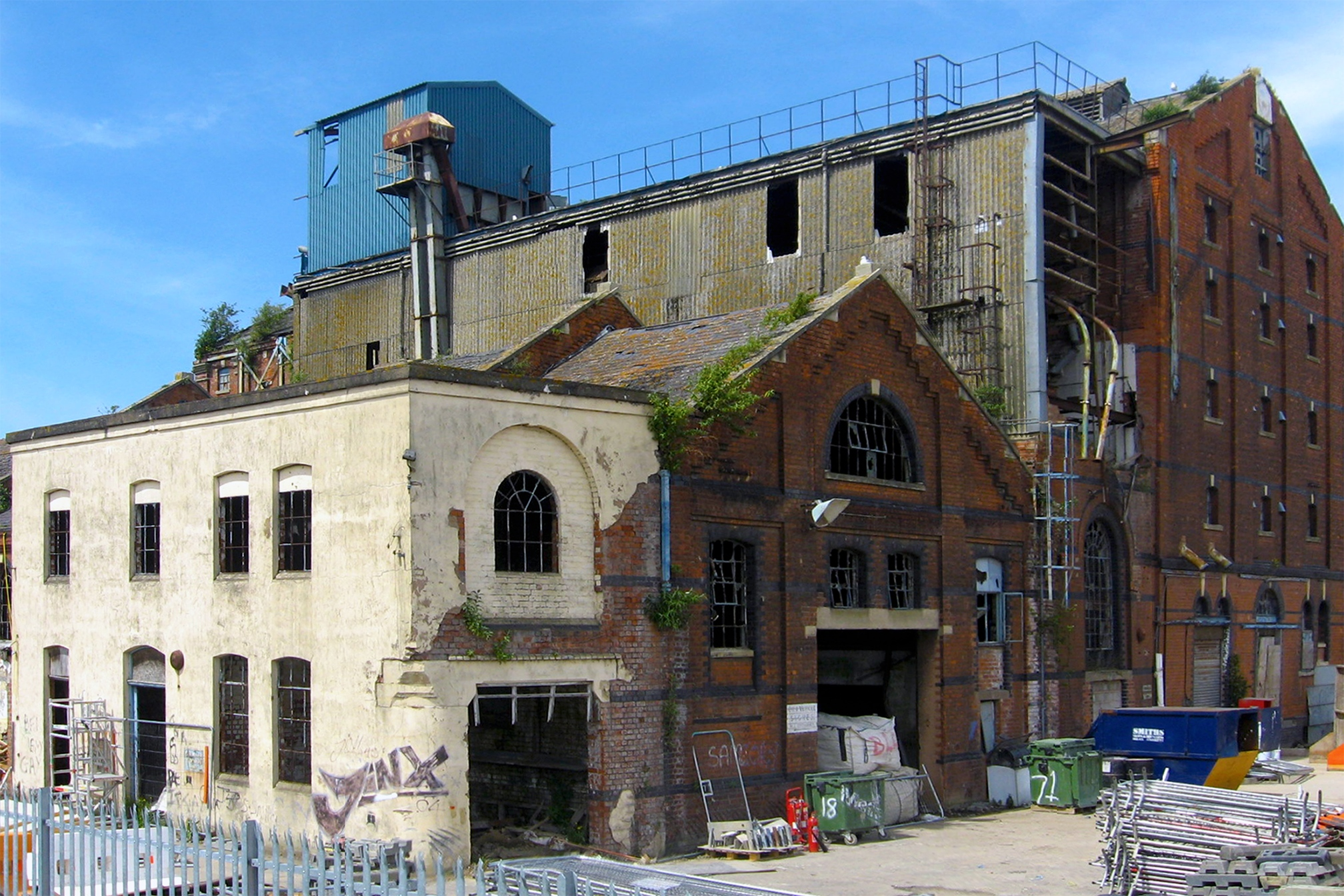
Llanthony Provender Mill, 2009

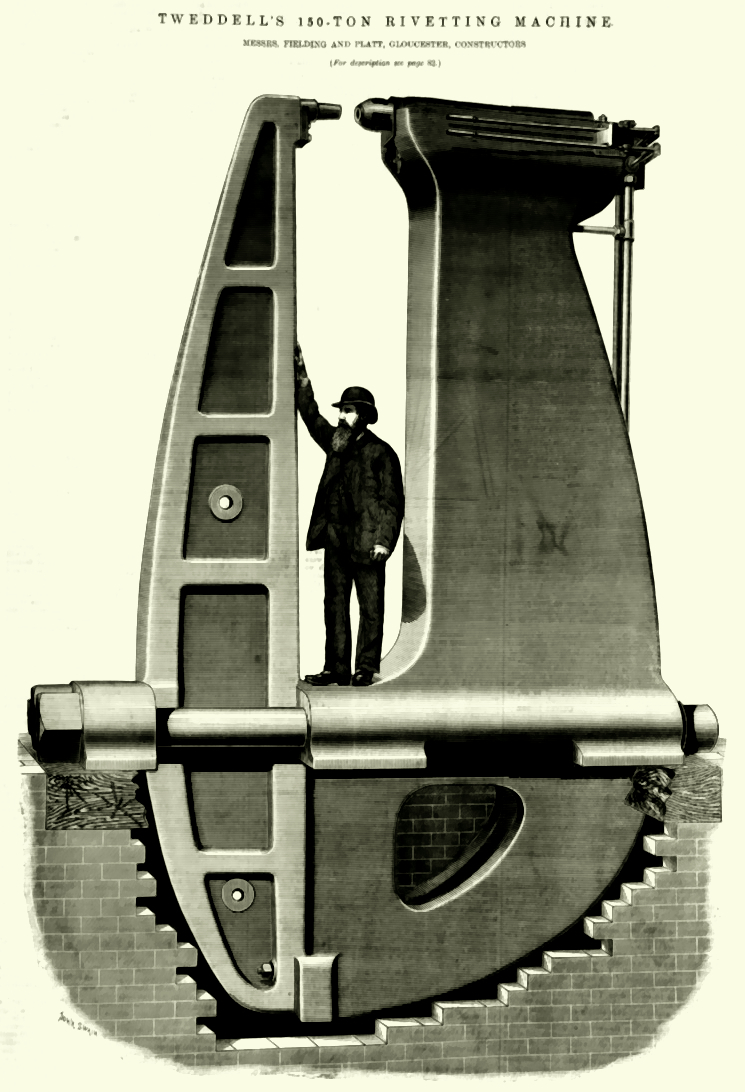
Tweddell's 150-Ton Riveting Machine (1885), made by Fielding & Platt.

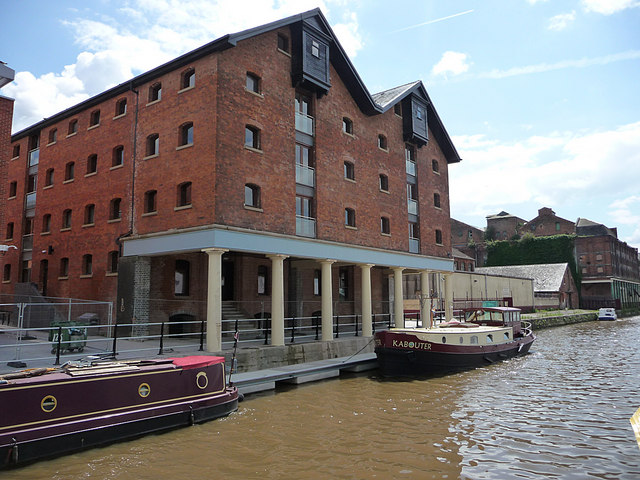
Pillar & Lucy Warehouse at Baker's Quay, 2009

High Orchard was an industrial area of the city of Gloucester in England that was developed in the 19th century on the former orchard of the Priory of Llanthony Secunda (1136). The area was closely associated with Gloucester Docks immediately to the north, and served by the Gloucester and Sharpness Canal and railway transport. It was the site of Fielding & Platt's Atlas Works and a number of other significant local employers.

It was centred on High Orchard Street which ran between Llanthony Road to the north and Baker Street to the south. To the west was Baker's Quay and to the east Southgate Street. Immediately south of Baker Street was the terminus of the High Orchard branch railway line.

Most of the area is now the site of the Gloucester Quays shopping centre and associated buildings, with some original buildings surviving as part of the shopping centre and along the canal side.

== Early history ==
High Orchard was sited on the former orchard of the Priory of Llanthony Secunda, founded in 1136 by monks in Wales who retreated to Gloucester and Hereford after attacks by the local populace.

== 19th century ==
The area was developed in the 19th century, and from the 1830s was particularly known for its timber yards which benefited from the opening of the Gloucester and Sharpness Canal in 1827 and, from 1848, new railway connections. Firms imported timber, prepared it for the building industry, and preserved it by kyanizing it or treating it with creosote. The flour-milling industry was present and flour-milling machinery was made at High Orchard Works (1851), while Atlas Works (1860) was the home of Fielding & Platt who made industrial machinery with a specialism in heavy-duty hydraulics. The cabinet makers J. A. Matthew & Co. built a large manufactory in 1894 that was destroyed by fire in 1912.

The area was centred on High Orchard Street which ran between Llanthony Road to the north and Baker Street to the south. Other streets were Merchants' Street which ran parallel to High Orchard Street, St Luke's Street, and Church Street.

In 1848, the Midland Railway built a branch line from the city station to High Orchard immediately south of Baker Street, and which ran north through the area's industrial buildings into Gloucester Docks. South of the branch line was the works of the Gloucester Railway Carriage and Wagon Company.

There was a small amount of housing served by the Church of England's Church of St. Luke, designed by Thomas Fulljames and consecrated in 1841. There was also a Norwegian Chapel immediately south of the railway line, and a Mission Room on the corner of Llanthony Road and Southgate Street.

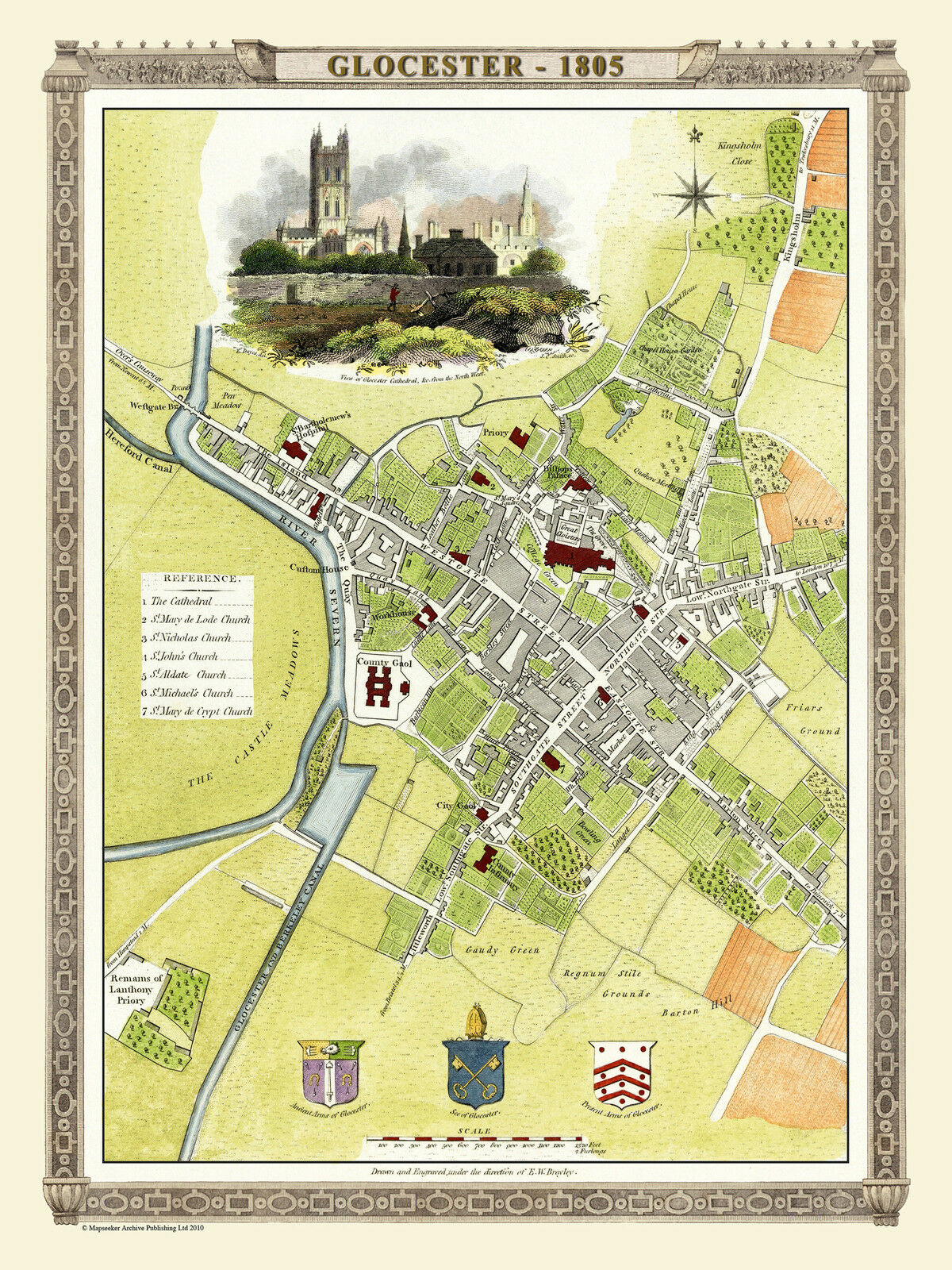
1805 map of Gloucester after the construction of the Gloucester and Sharpness Canal but before the development of High Orchard

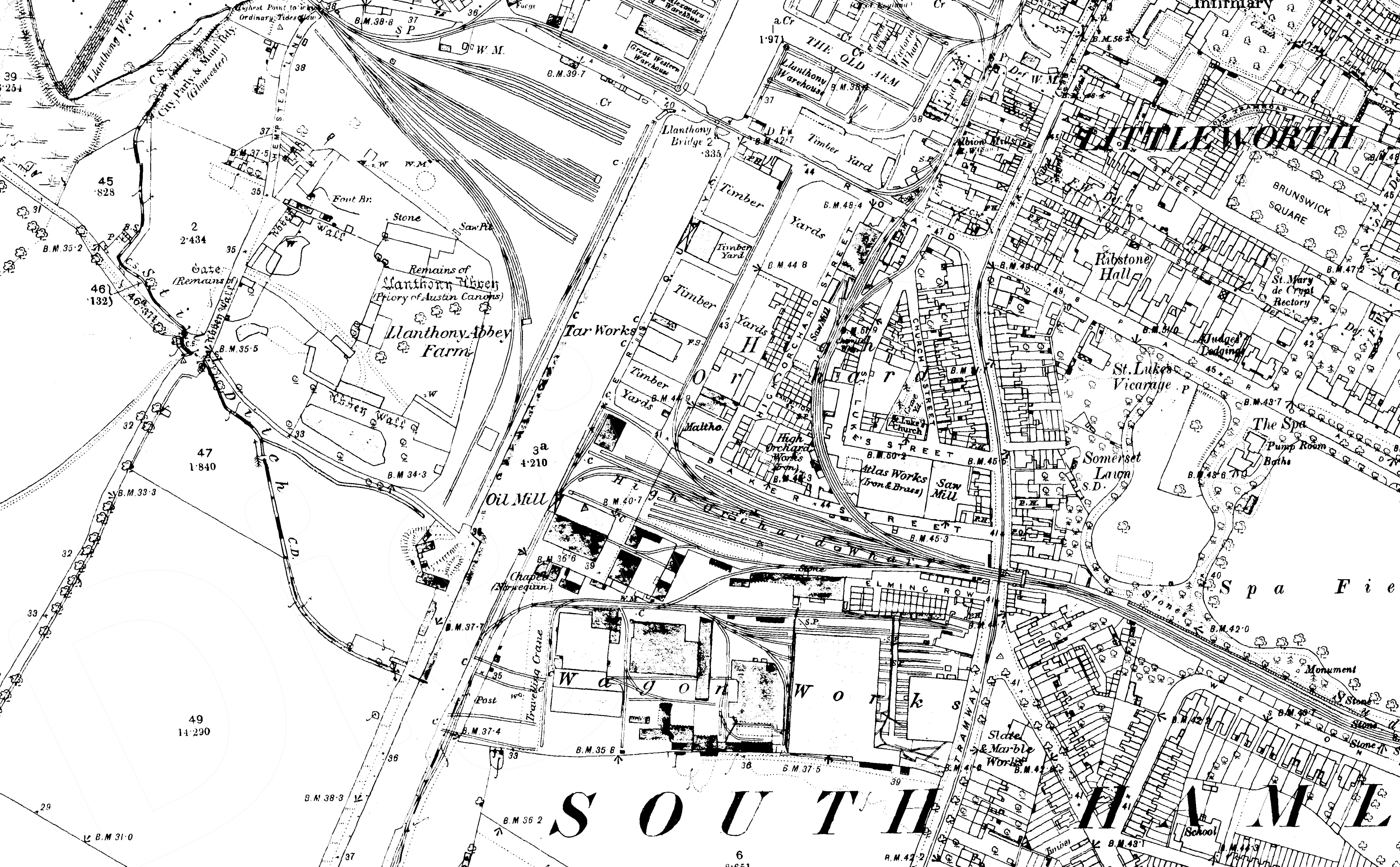
High Orchard on an 1880s Ordnance Survey map showing timber yards on the east bank of the canal

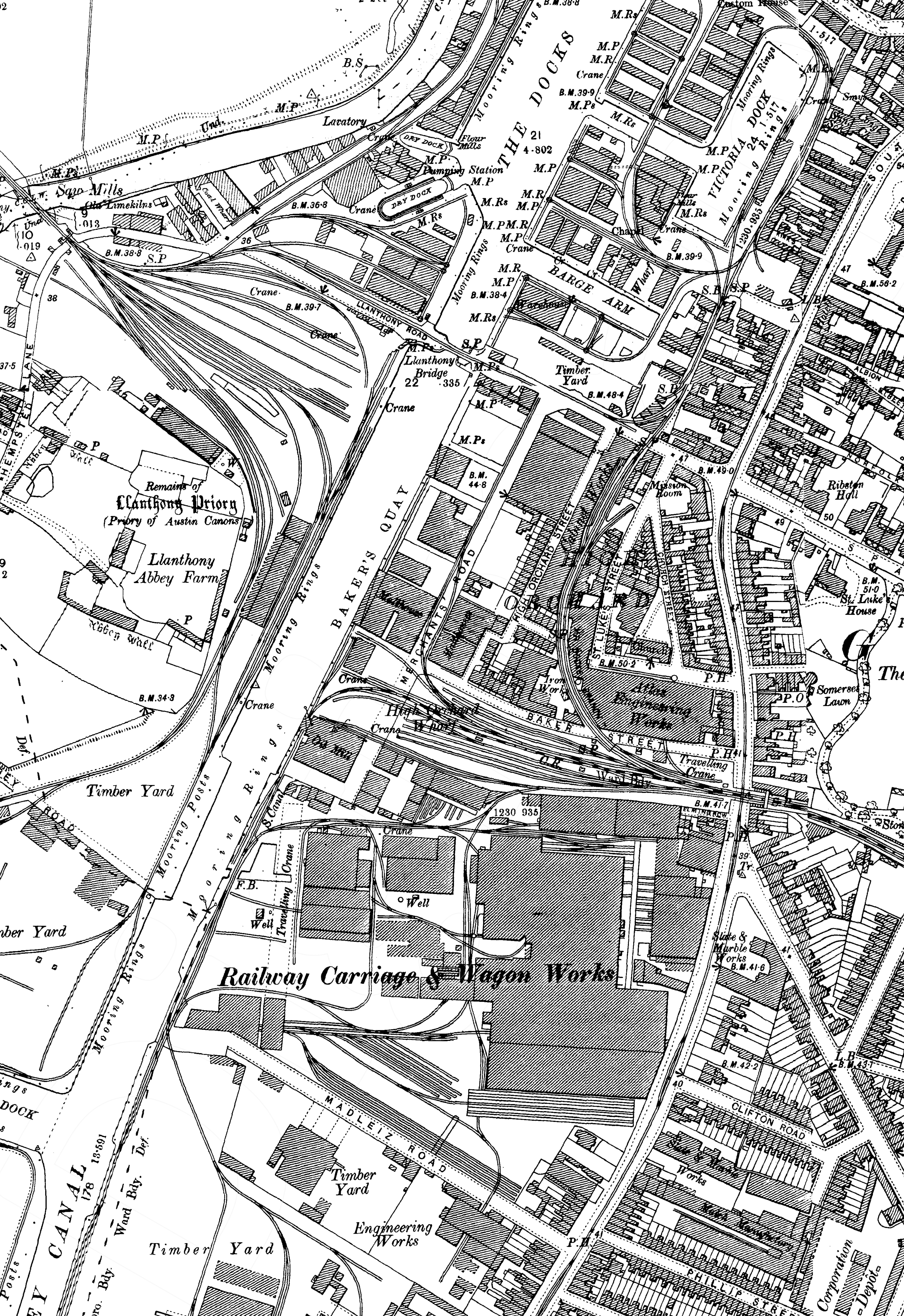
High Orchard on a c.1900 Ordnance Survey map

== 20th century ==
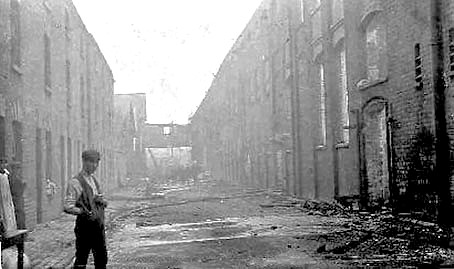
High Orchard Street (looking north), aftermath of the J.A. Matthews & Co fire, July 1912

In July 1912, a fire broke out at J. A. Matthew & Co. in High Orchard Street and Llanthony Road that destroyed a 400ft long factory and nine houses in High Orchard Street. It also seriously damaged six houses in Exhibition Street. The fire was visible from Cranham, and was extinguished by fire fighters from Stroud and Cheltenham as the Gloucester engine was out of action. Over 200 men were made unemployed as a result of the fire.

A carpet manufacturer moved to the area in the late 1930s and by 1975 there was a carpet factory there employing 250 people.

West Midland Farmers' Association, an agricultural co-operative, owned buildings at Baker's Quay (1955) and a former maltings (1983) at High Orchard, and in 1983 employed 383 people.

The Church of St. Luke was demolished in 1934 and stained glass from the building, much of it German or Dutch of the fifteenth to the eighteenth centuries, was reused at Holy Trinity Church, Longlevens.

== 21st century ==
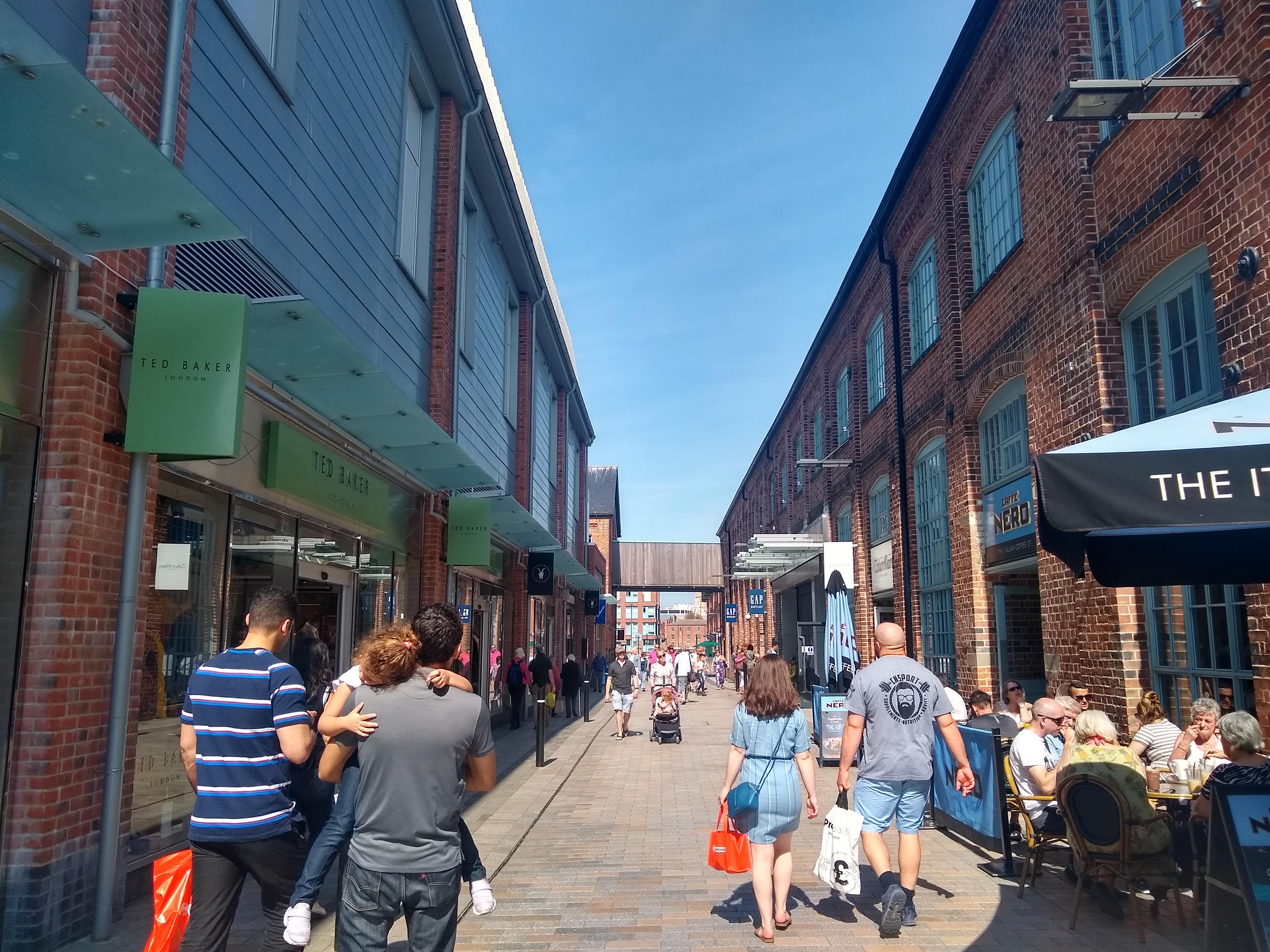
High Orchard Street in the Gloucester Quays development with former Matthews factory on the right

Most of High Orchard was redeveloped as Gloucester Quays shopping centre and associated buildings in the early 2000s. The surviving streets are High Orchard Street, Baker Street, Church Street, Llanthony Road, Southgate Street, and Merchants' Road. St Luke's Street no longer exists, Church Street is much longer than it once was, and Baker Street has a different course. Some existing buildings were retained on the canal side or incorporated into the shopping centre. These include listed buildings Pillar and Lucy Warehouses (c.1838), Sudbrooke House (1840s), Llanthony Provender Mill (1862), and Downings Malthouse (1893).

Llanthony Provender Mill was seriously damaged in an arson attack in 2015 which left it a "dilapidated shell". It was subsequently rebuilt as luxury flats.

Other listed buildings along Llanthony Road and Southgate Street are St Lukes House, the Mariners Hall, 172 Southgate Street, and 182/184 Southgate Street.

In 2017, the last four surviving dockers' cottages (1902) in High Orchard Street were released for sale after renovation.

== Bridges ==
High Orchard has two bridges that cross the Gloucester and Sharpness Canal; Llanthony Road Bridge in the north, and the High Orchard Bridge (2008) in the south on the newly constructed St Ann Way.

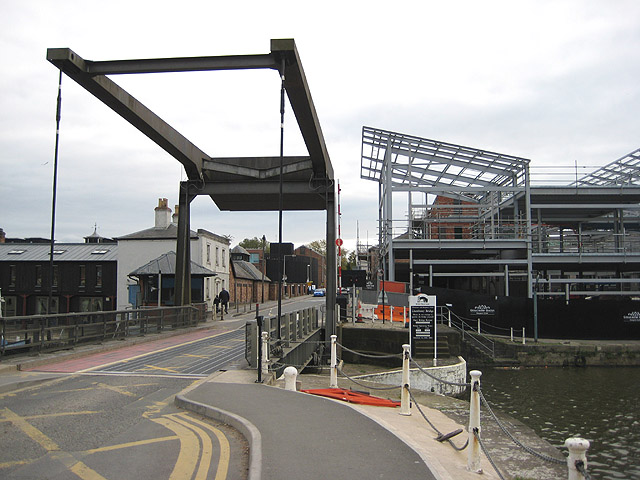
Llanthony Road Bridge looking east along Llanthony Road

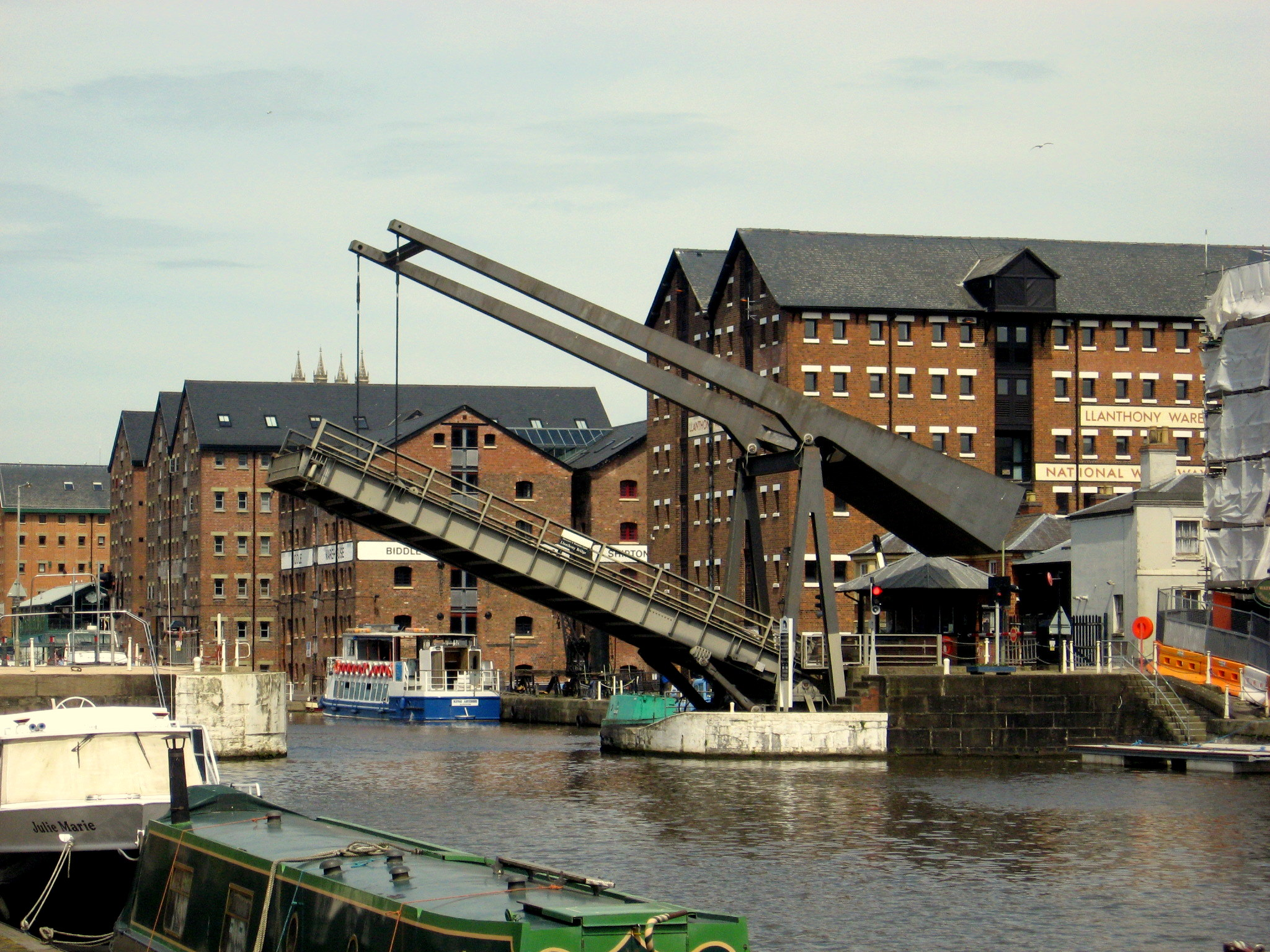
Llanthony Road Bridge looking north

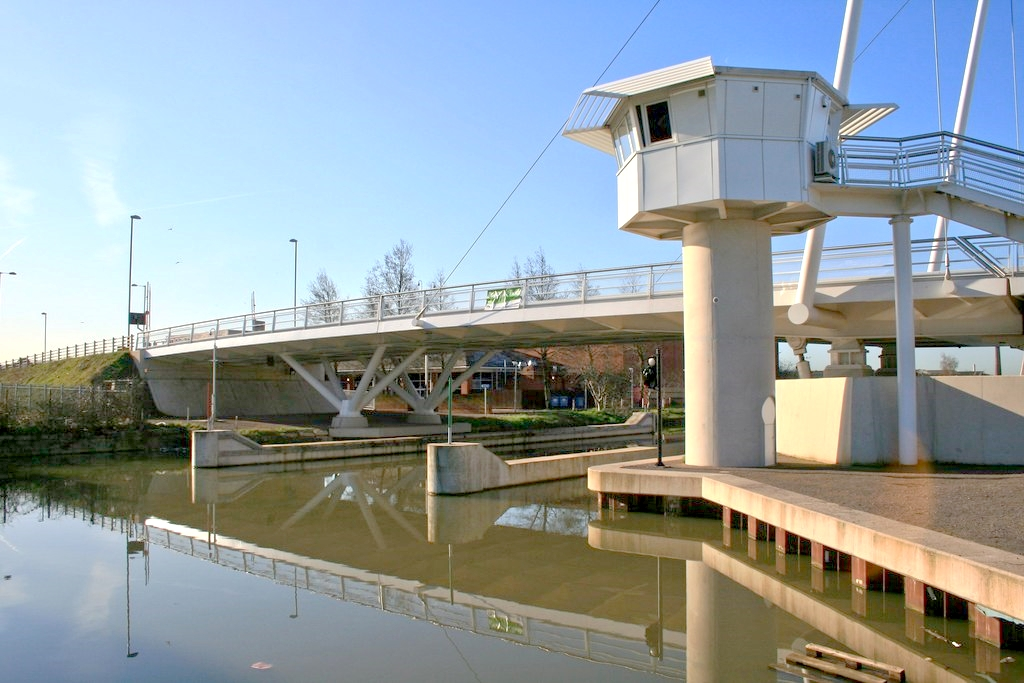
High Orchard Bridge

== See also ==
- Priday, Metford and Company Limited
