= Holy Trinity Church, Longlevens =

Church in Longlevens, Gloucester, England

Coordinates: 51°52′31″N 2°12′38″W

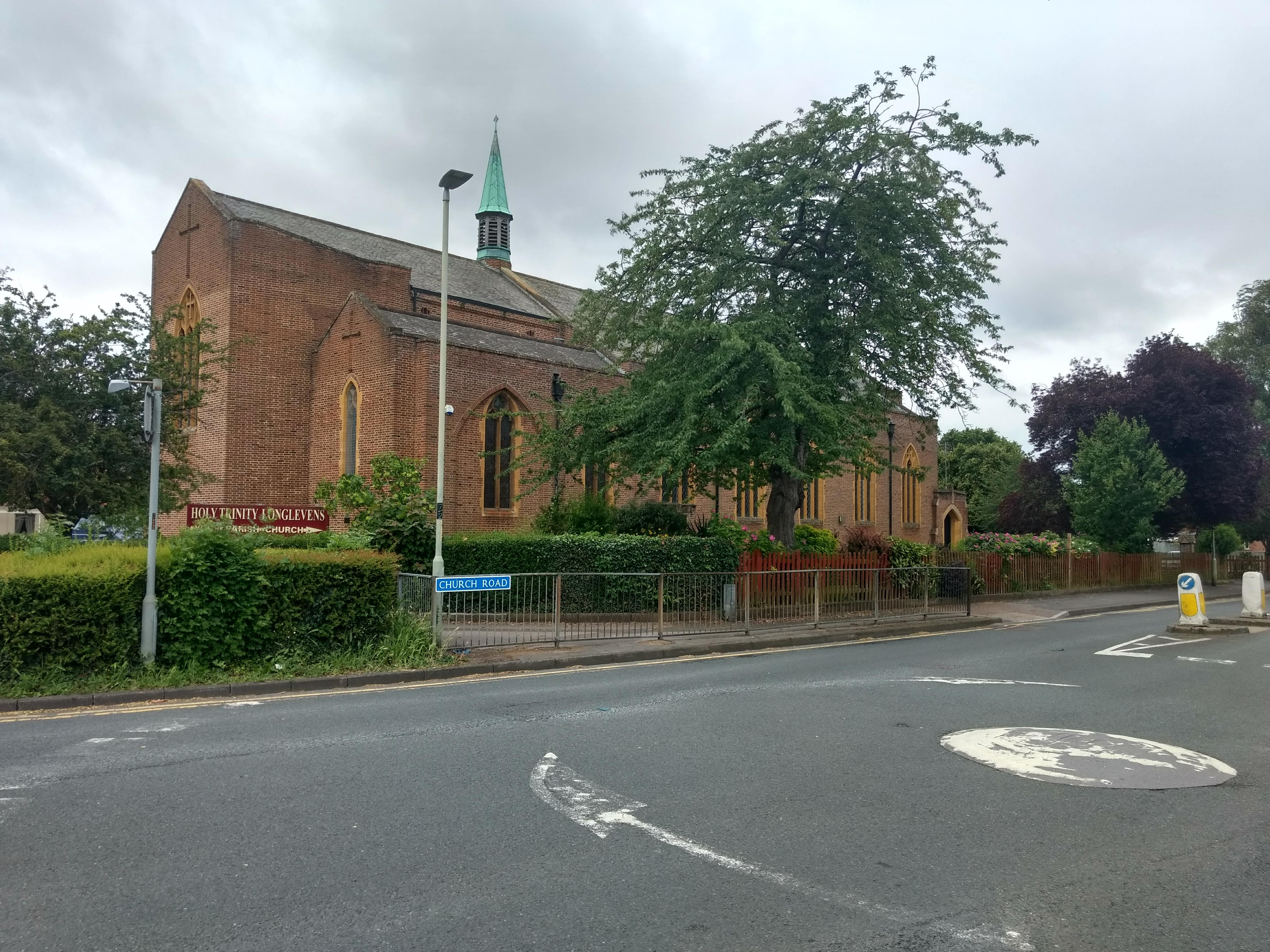
Holy Trinity Church

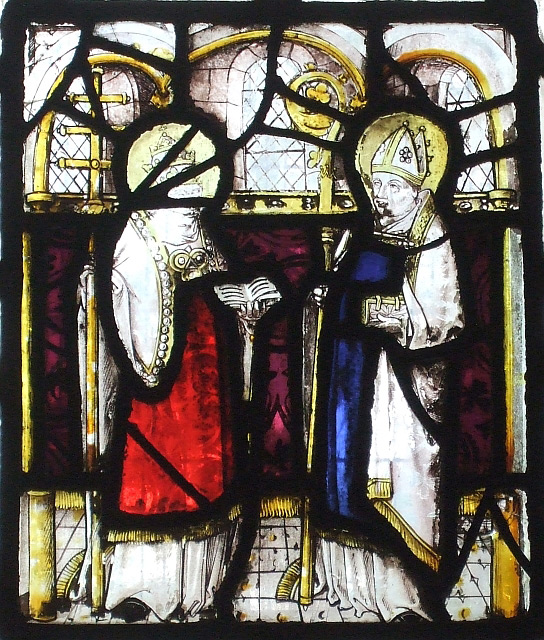
One of the church's stained glass windows formerly in the Church of St Luke, High Orchard.

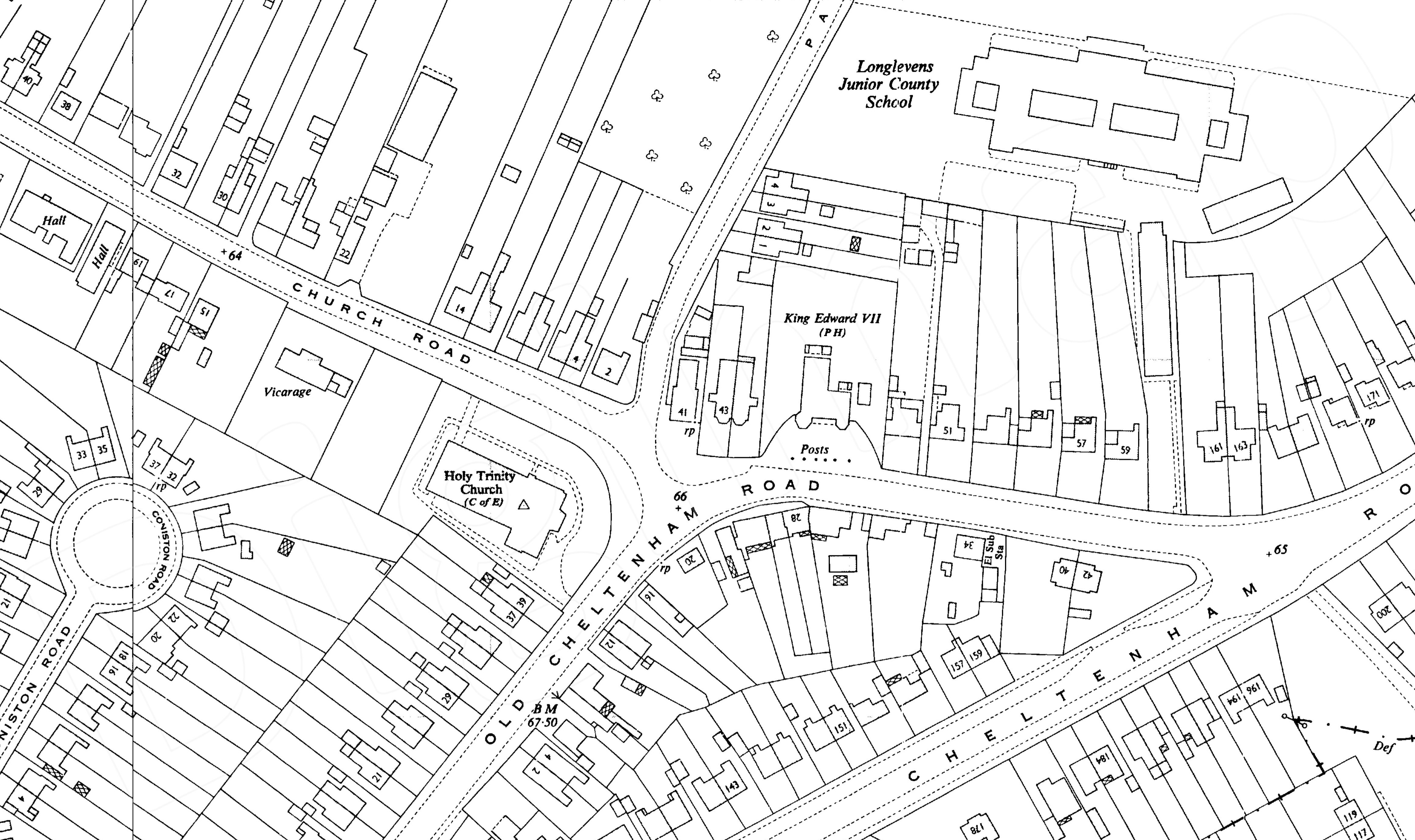
Holy Trinity (centre) on a 1950s map of Longlevens.

Holy Trinity Church is a Grade II listed Church of England parish church in Longlevens, Gloucester. It was designed by Harold Stratton Davis and built in 1933–1934 in a fifteenth-century perpendicular Gothic style. It includes German and Dutch stained glass that was transferred from the Church of St Luke, High Orchard, Gloucester, after that church was demolished in 1934.

== History and design ==
The church was designed by Harold Stratton Davis whose father had been curate-in-charge of Longlevens. It was built in 1933-1934 in a fifteenth-century Perpendicular Gothic style. It uses local materials such as Coleford red brick laid in Flemish bond, Guiting stone dressings, and Delabole slate (from Cornwall) for the roof. Local blacksmith Alfred Bucknell made the cast-iron rainwater heads and other ironwork. The font was a gift of the freemasons of Gloucester. The church was consecrated on 31 March 1934 and replaced a nineteenth-century corrugated iron mission church, known locally as the "tin tabernacle", which was located nearby.

It is Grade II listed with Historic England who describe it as notable for its largely unaltered 1930s decorative scheme which uses fittings mostly designed by the architect that remain a "remarkably complete suite". The majority of the stained glass is not original to the church with much German or Dutch of the fifteenth to the eighteenth centuries. It was a gift of the Reverend Samuel Lysons from the east window of the Church of St Luke, High Orchard, Gloucester, after that church was demolished in 1934. The east window to the chapel is by Molly Meager, 1989. There are two war memorial plaques at the west end.
