= The Inch, Edinburgh =

District of Edinburgh

Coordinates: 55.922°N 3.154°W

The Inch
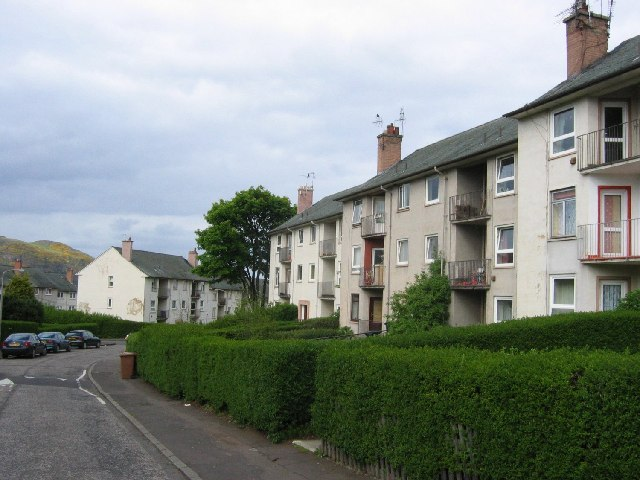
- Examples of Inch housing

- Location within the City of Edinburgh council area Location within Scotland
- OS grid reference: NT279704
- Council area: City of Edinburgh
- Lieutenancy area: Edinburgh
- Country: Scotland
- Sovereign state: United Kingdom
- Post town: Edinburgh
- Postcode district: EH16
- Dialling code: 0131
- Police: Scotland
- Fire: Scottish
- Ambulance: Scottish
- UK Parliament: Edinburgh South
- Scottish Parliament: Edinburgh Southern

The Inch is a district of Edinburgh, Scotland, located to the south of Inch Park in the south of the city. It is located 2 miles (3 km) south south-east of central Edinburgh. It incorporates the Inch housing development, Inch Park and the category A listed Inch House, a former country house now used as a community centre. The associated Inch Doocot or dovecot, also a category A listed building, is situated close by, west of Gilmerton Road.

== Etymology ==
The word "Inch" derives from the Scots Gaelic innis which can mean either "island" or a dry area within marshland or a river meadow. This suggests that the land on which it stands was originally dry land in the flood plain of the nearby Braid Burn.

== The Inch housing development ==
The housing development is bounded by Old Dalkeith Road to the east, Liberton Road to the west, Kingston Avenue to the south and Glenallan Drive and Inch Park to the north.

The housing development began in 1949. The City of Edinburgh Council had departed from the usual practice of using in-house architects for the design and arranged for a competition open to private firms of architects. The judges were George Macniven, formerly chief architect at the Department of Health for Scotland assisted by the City Architect, Ebenezer MacRae, and Lady Gilmour, a previous resident of the adjacent Inch House. Sixty-eight designs were considered and David Stratton Davis of the family firm Stratton Davis & Yates based in Gloucester, England, was judged the winner. He was 29 years old.

Stratton based his design on Garden City guidelines, popular at the time. This envisaged a self-contained community adjacent to large green spaces, in this case Inch Park. As well as preserving as many existing trees as possible many new trees were planted. Vistas were also important in the design so that from the site there are views to the east of Craigmillar Castle and to the south and west views of Blackford Hill and the Pentland Hills. The design included local amenities like schools and churches and shops.

Housing was designed to accommodate families, older people and single people and so contained houses of differing sizes and small flatted blocks. All housing was low rise. Roofs were finished with slate, pantiles or copper, and the walls were rendered to give a cream finish. Flats were to account for no more than 10% of the housing and each house was to have a garden and drying area, with houses at least 20 feet (6.1 m) back from the pavement. By 1953 the houses were all occupied.

In 1955 the Saltire Society considered it to be "the best designed local authority housing in Scotland" and presented an award. Many houses in the estate have now passed into private ownership.

Many of the streets are named for characters and places in the novels and poems of Sir Walter Scott. A later development to the north-west has street names associated with the poet Robert Burns.

A parade of shops was built on the main thoroughfare, Walter Scott Avenue. The primary schools serving the area are Liberton Primary School and St. John Vianney Roman Catholic Primary School.

A pillar box placed in November 1952 on Gilmerton Road was the first in Scotland to carry the insignia E II R. There was opposition to this on the grounds that Queen Elizabeth was the first of that name to rule over Scotland. The pillar box became the target of attacks and was destroyed by a gelignite bomb on 12 February 1953. The replacement pillar box carried an image of the Crown of Scotland.

== Inch House ==
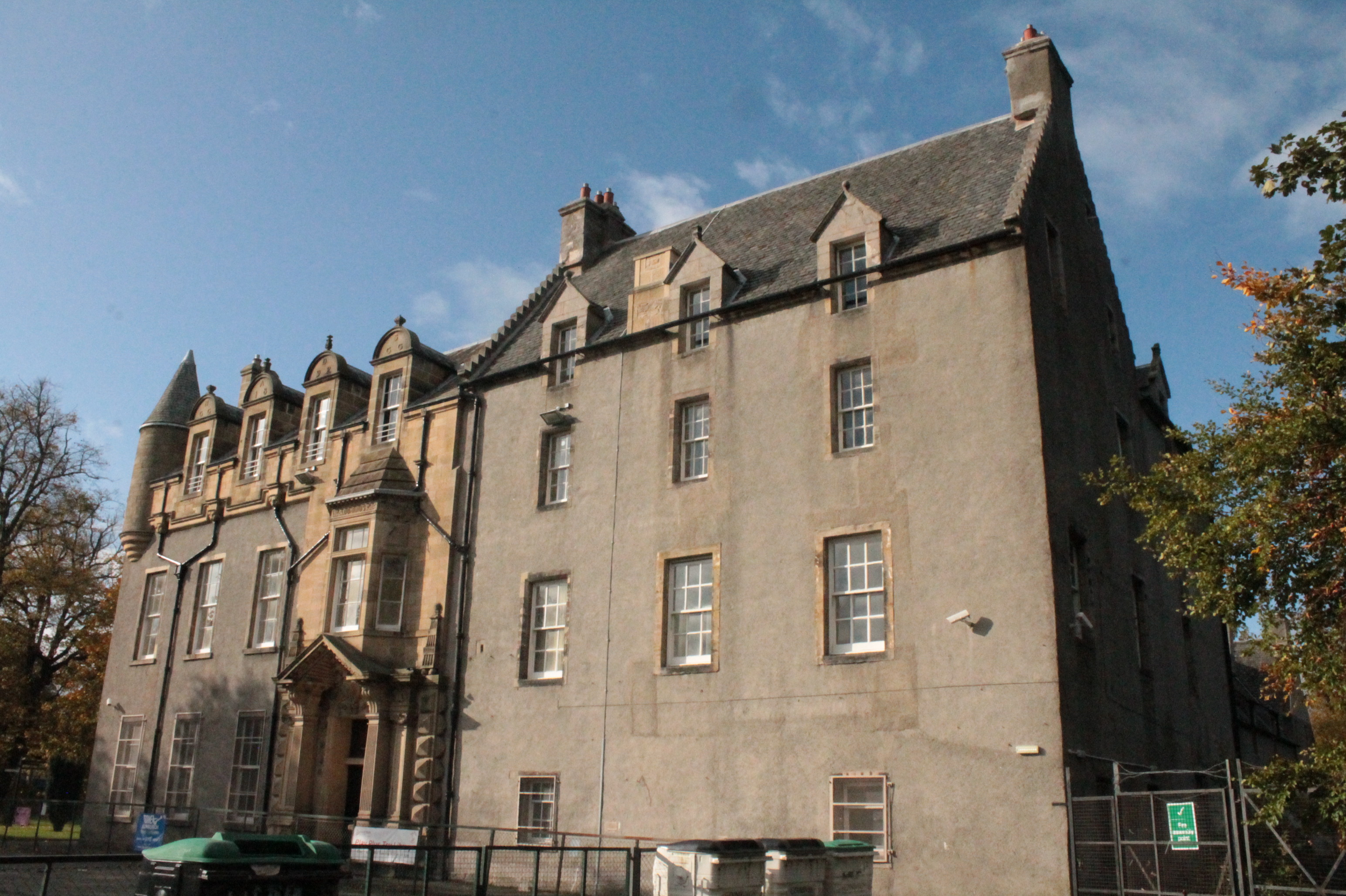
Inch House in Edinburgh

The area grew around Inch House, a Scottish vernacular tower house dating from 1617. It is a category A listed building.

The house was sold to the City of Edinburgh Council in 1946 and served as a primary school before the building was turned into a community centre.

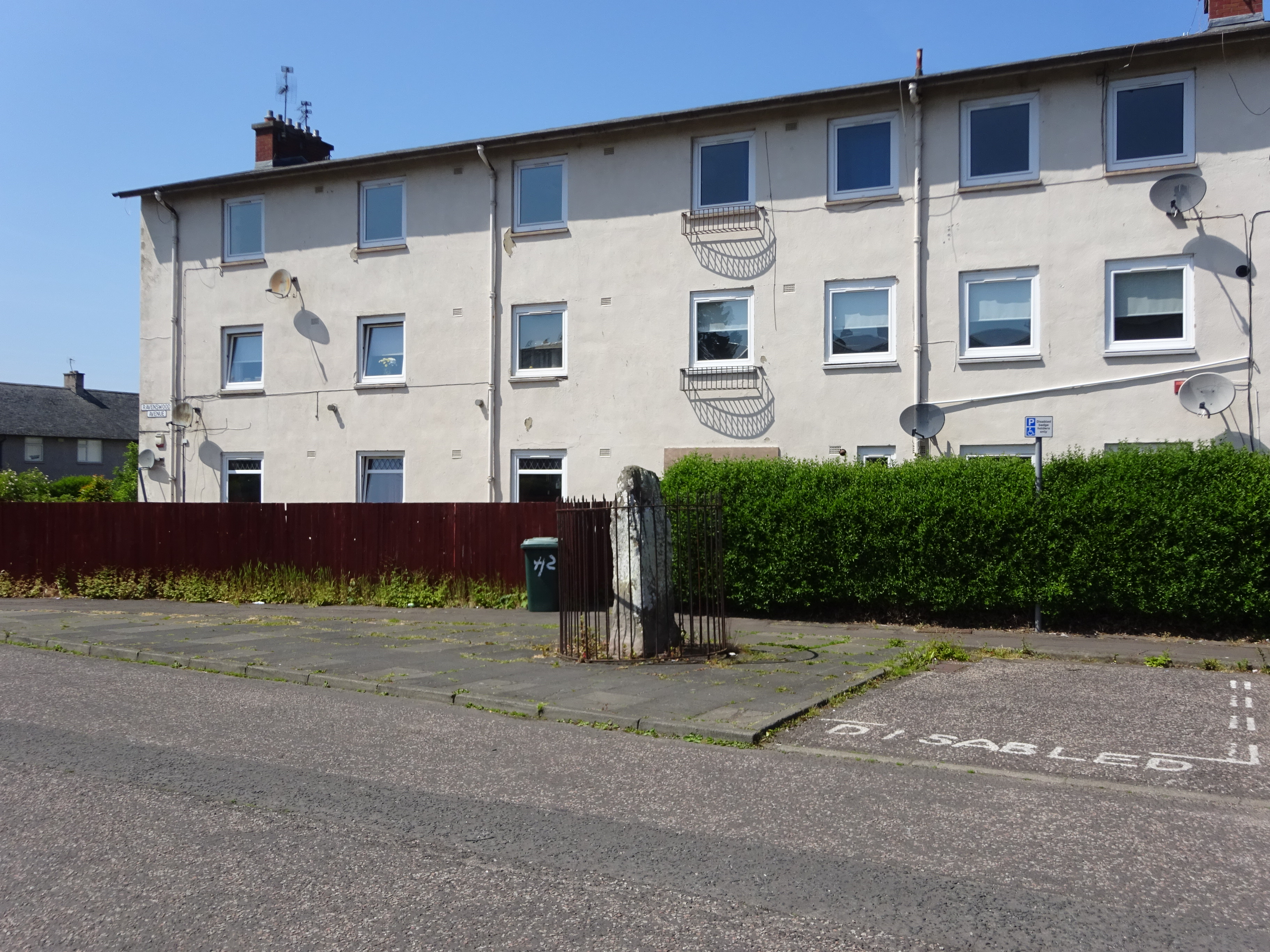
The Ravenswood standing stone, Ravenswood Avenue, at the Inch.

== Inch Park ==
Inch Park sports pitches with Arthur's Seat in the background

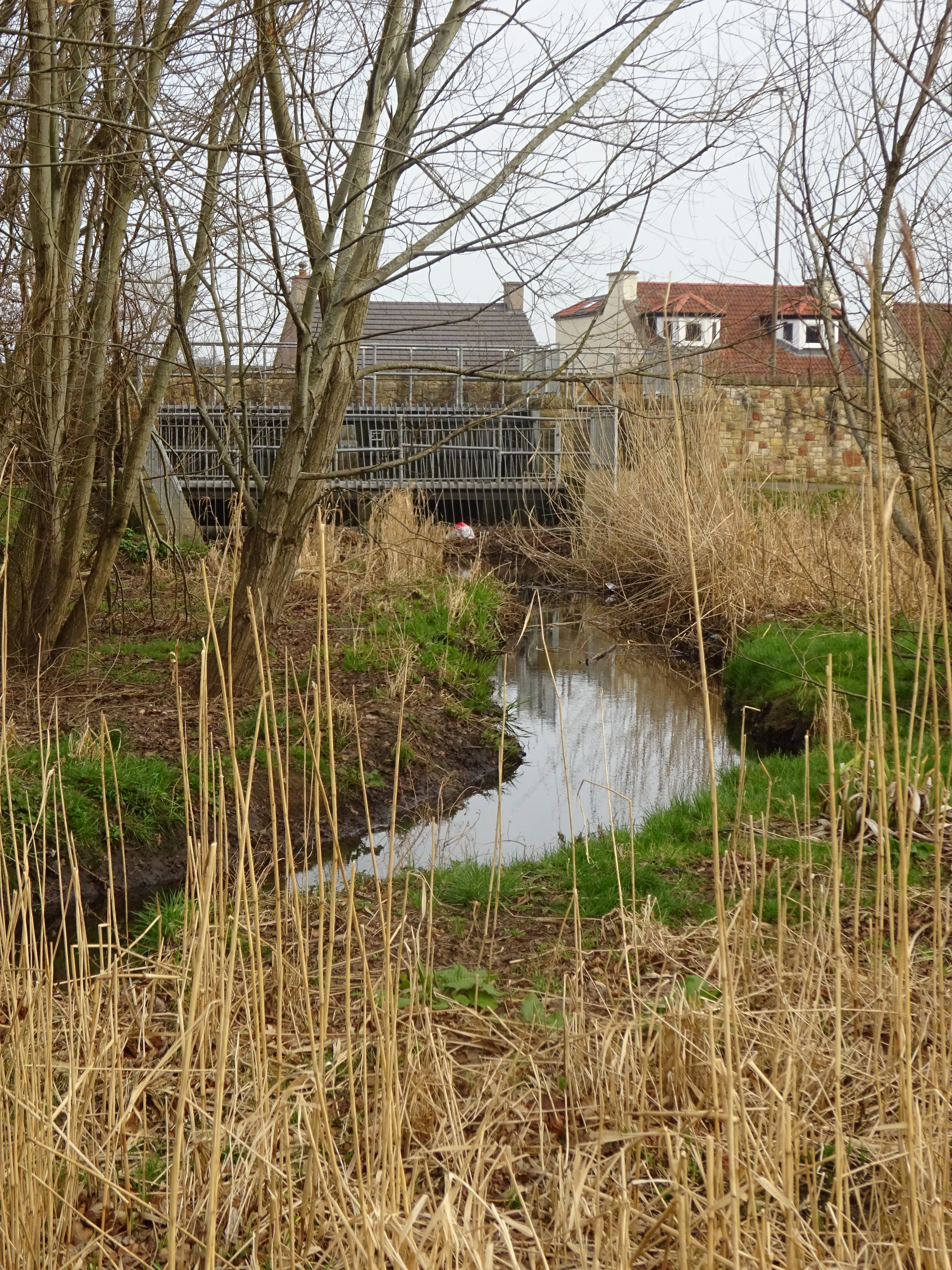
The Braid Burn in Inch Park

Inch Park was formerly the estate around Inch House. It is now a public park which incorporates sports pitches, used for rugby and football in winter and cricket in summer. There is a children's play area to the south of the park. It is bounded on the north east by Old Dalkeith Road (A7) and on the northwest by Gilmerton Road (A772). The Braid Burn, which runs west to east within the northern boundary was the subject of a flood prevention scheme begun in 2010. Ownership passed from the Gilmour family to the City of Edinburgh Council in 1946. In 2009 Inch Park Community Sports Club took over the management of the park from the city Council. The Sports club is a charity registered in Scotland (SC040057), formed to provide sporting and leisure activities for local sports clubs and the local community. Integral to the plan was the partnership between three sports clubs based at the park, Lismore Rugby Football Club, Edinburgh South Community Football Club and Edinburgh South Cricket Club.

The community Sports Club was given an 80-year lease to manage the park. They received initial financial support from the City of Edinburgh Council, The Robertson Trust, Sportscotland and from the Scottish Landfill Communities Fund administered by WREN.

The sports facilities include two rugby pitches, two football pitches and a cricket oval. There is a sports pavilion which has changing accommodation, licensed bar, kitchen and meeting room. The Sports Club was given recognition as a Community Sports Hub by Sportscotland, the first such in Scotland.

The club is governed by a board of trustees.

=== Edinburgh South Cricket Club ===
The cricket club has 3 men's teams in the East of Scotland Cricket Association league.

In addition, there is a Sunday team, the Edinburgh South Mitres, which play friendly matches. There is also a women's and girls section.

=== Edinburgh South Community Football Club ===
The football club has been given the Scottish Football Association Quality Mark as an accredited Platinum Club. It fields some 50 teams in various leagues and stages, involving around 650 players and around 125 volunteer coaches and officials.

It provides a pathway for boys from soccer school up to senior football, previously in partnership with Whitehill Welfare until 2020, when the club had their own adult team accepted into the East of Scotland Football League (initially to play at Dalkeith. A community coach is establishing a similar pathway for girls.

=== Lismore Rugby Football Club ===
The rugby union club was founded in 1901 and has played at Inch Park since the 1953/54 season. Previously it was based at various locations. It fields 2 men's teams and a women's team.

It is a charity registered in Scotland (SC043329).

== Inch plant nursery ==
The Inch Nursery occupies a 10-acre site to the east of the park. It was formerly the walled garden of Inch House. Owned by the City of Edinburgh Council, it is used to grow most of the plants for the city's municipal gardens and green spaces. It is a training centre for horticulture and operates a shop that sells plants to the public

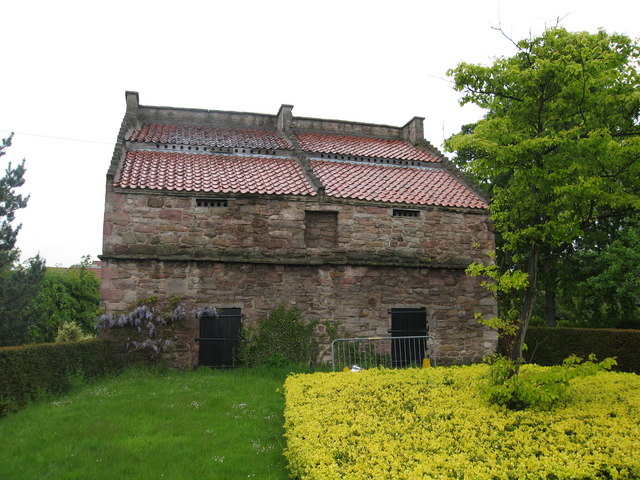
The Inch Doocot

== Inch Doocot ==
This is the largest remaining doocot (or dovecot) in Edinburgh. It is sited on Gilmerton Road and is a category A listed building. Dating from the 17th century, it has 2 chambers built of sandstone, each with a boarded door and 16 flight holes. Above the chambers is a rat course, designed to stop rats climbing in. The roof is finished with pantiles. It is estimated that there are around 2000 stone nesting boxes.

== Demographics ==
The Liberton/Gilmerton ward had 37,672 inhabitants at the 2021 Census.

| Ethnicity | Liberton/Gilmerton Ward | Edinburgh |
|---|---|---|
| White | 82.6% | 84.9% |
| Asian | 10.2% | 8.6% |
| Black | 2.7% | 2.1% |
| Mixed | 2.4% | 2.5% |
| Other | 2.1% | 1.9% |
