= Fielding & Platt =

Hydraulic engineering firm

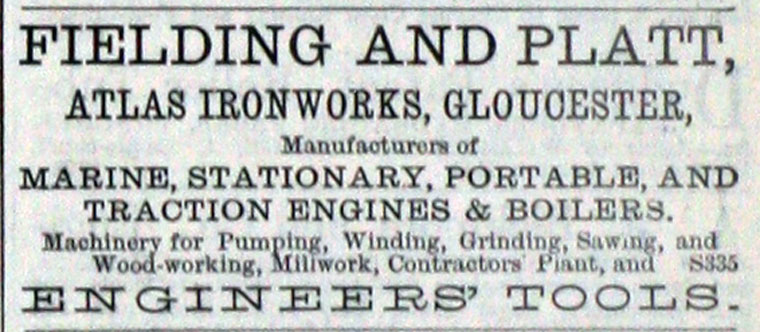
A press advert for Fielding & Platt from April 1870.

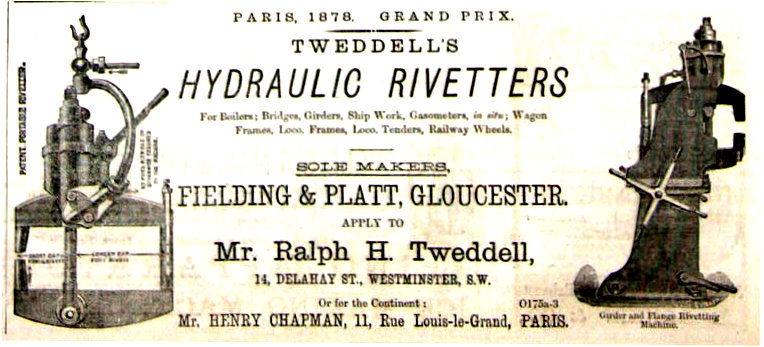
An 1880 advert for the firm extolling its manufacture of Tweddell's Hydraulic Rivetters.

Fielding & Platt (founded October 1866) was a firm of hydraulic engineers who were an important part of the manufacturing sector in Gloucester until the 1990s. Started by two Lancashire men, Samuel Fielding (died 1874) and James Platt, the firm exploited the portable hydraulic riveting technology of Ralph Hart Tweddell to build a business that exported hydraulic machinery worldwide. Apart from the wide range of items made, the firm was particularly noted for the quality and long life of their products.

James Platt was also a director of the Gloucester Railway Carriage and Wagon Company.

A later partner in the firm, John Platt, was the father of actress Marjorie Fielding.

== First orders ==
The first orders were for small engineering machines and components but the firm quickly expanded into bigger items. They produced an iron seagoing steamer in 1868 and in 1870 they produced the steam boat S.S. Sabrina for the Gloucester & Berkeley Canal Co that was used on the canal between Gloucester and Sharpness. The Sabrina is still in use on the Thames.

Between 1873 and 1875 they converted a number of broad gauge locomotives for stationary duties at Llanharon Colliery and in 1880 they built a bridge across the Severn at Gloucester Docks, adjacent to the North Warehouse, which was not replaced until 1962.

== The Tweddell System ==
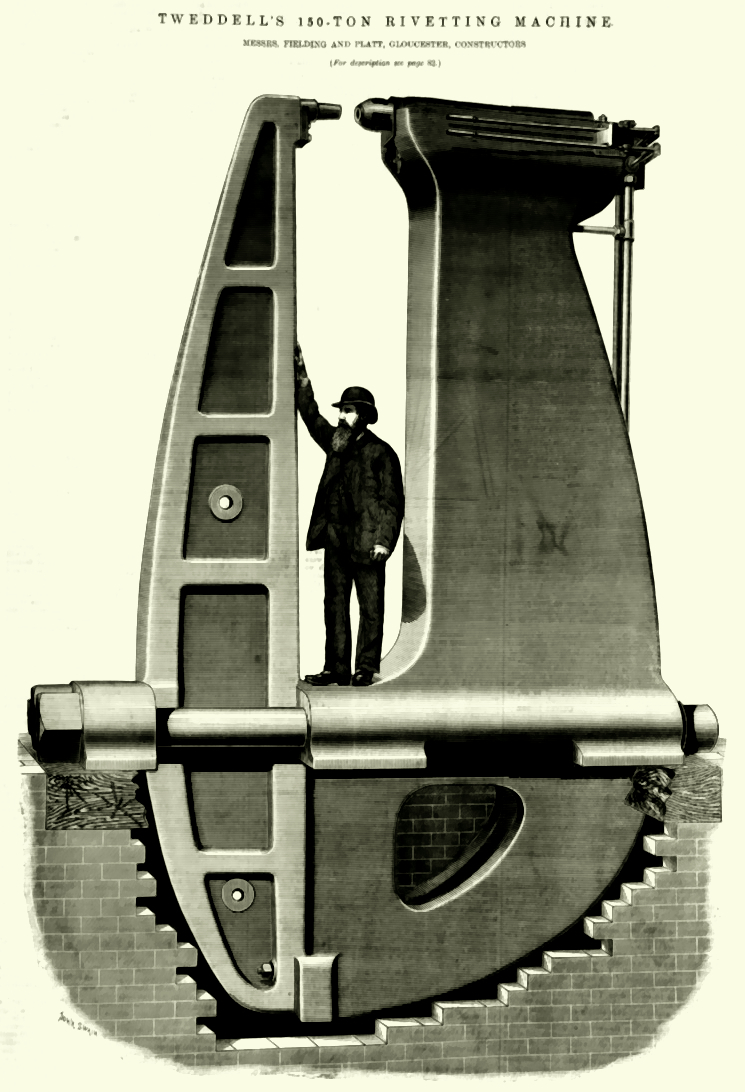
Tweddell's 150-Ton Rivetting Machine (1885), made by Fielding & Platt.

In 1871 the firm was approached by the engineer Ralph Tweddell to manufacture his portable hydraulic riveter and it was the firm's exploitation of the Tweddell System that enabled them to become pre-eminent in the field of portable hydraulic riveting. The riveter was soon being exported worldwide and it was used in the construction of sewage mains in Sydney, Australia (1892) and in building the Forth Bridge (1890).

== 1870s–1890s ==
In 1874 Samuel Fielding died and his two sons, James and John Fielding, became joint junior partners with James Platt. The company was expanding rapidly at this time, building new equipment and registering patents. The firm built furnaces, hydraulic presses, travelling cranes, and machinery for processing girders. In 1874 they made a 900 ton flanging press. The firm won awards for its equipment at Philadelphia (1876), Paris (1878) and London (1880). A wide range of steam and oil engines were developed.

The firm worked on the construction of Blackpool Tower.

== The twentieth century ==
In 1902 Fielding & Platt manufactured the first vacuum cleaner, designed by Hubert Cecil Booth, also of Gloucester.

The company was acquired by Heenan & Froude in 1939.

During World War II the factory manufactured munitions and parts for Hurricanes and Spitfires. Many more women worked for the company as many of the men had been called up for military service.

== Archive project ==
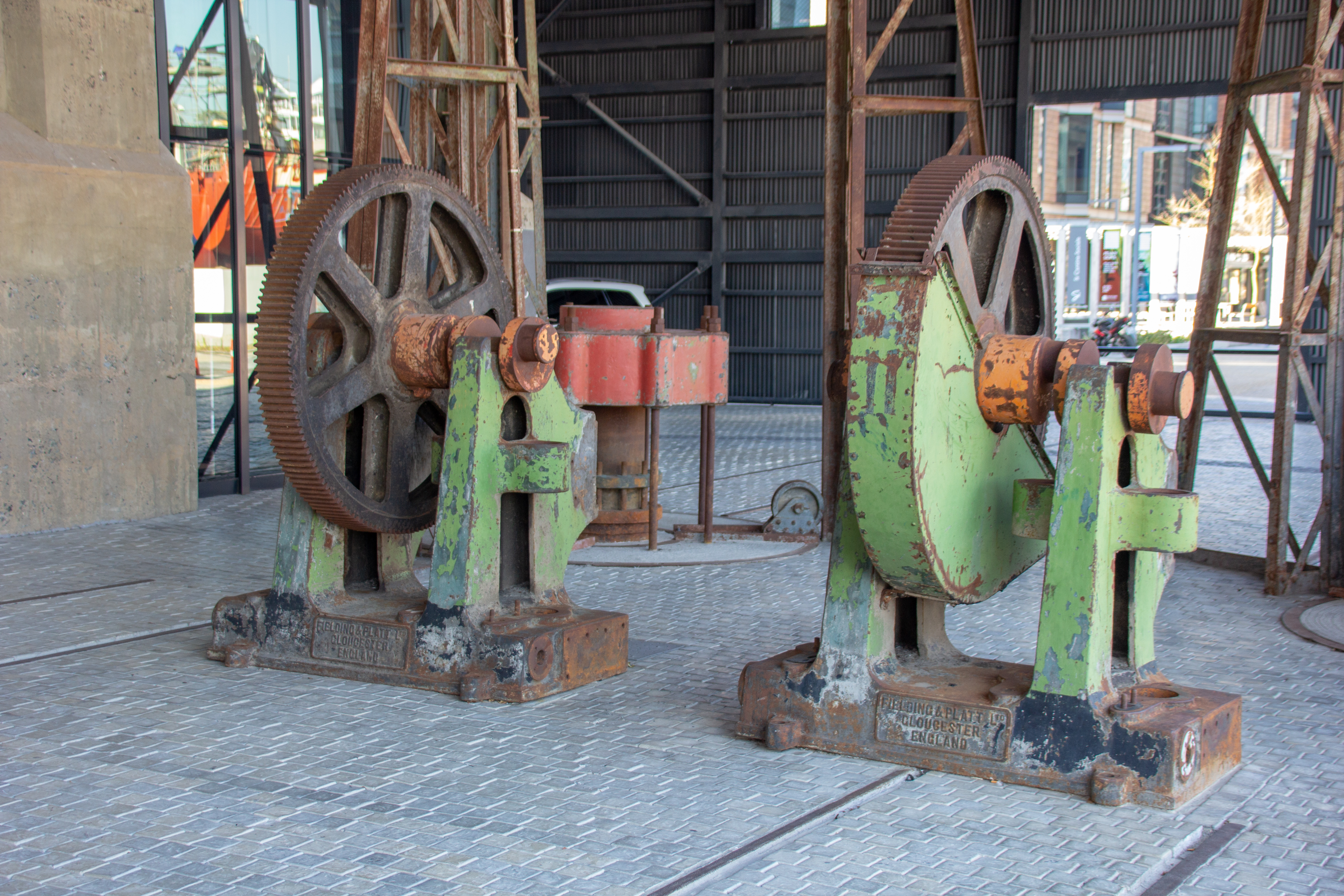
Fielding & Platt machinery in Cape Town

In 2012, the Fielding & Platt Community Archive Project received a £42,900 grant from the Heritage Lottery Fund to record and preserve the history of the company in Gloucester. A gallery with displays relating to the company has been opened at the Gloucester Quays shopping centre, which stands on land once occupied by Fielding & Platt.
